= 2014 Odisha Legislative Assembly election =

Assembly elections in Odisha, India

- 10 & 17 April 2014

All 147 Assembly Constituencies 74 seats needed for a majority
- Registered: 2,91,96,047 (▲7.36%)
- Turnout: 73.65% (▲8.35pp)
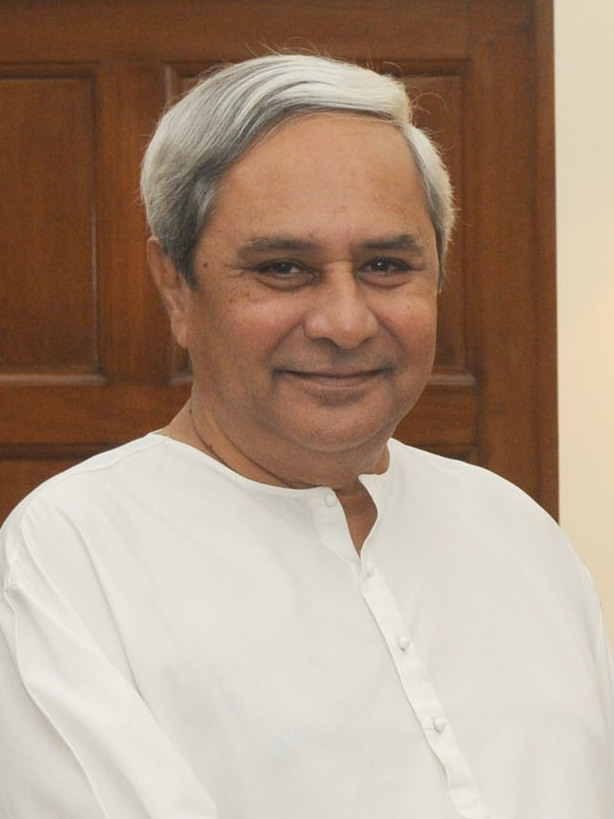

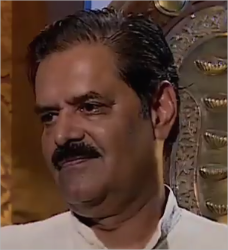
	Majority party	Minority party	Third party
Leader	Naveen Patnaik	Jayadeba Jena	Kanaka Bardhan Sing Deo
Party	BJD	INC	BJP
Alliance	Third Front (India)	UPA	NDA
Leader since	1996	2013	2013
Leader's seat	Hinjili (won)	Anandapur (lost)	Patanagarh (won)
Seats before	103	27	6
Seats won	117	16	10
Seat change	▲14	▼11	▲4
Popular vote	93,34,582	55,35,670	38,74,739
Percentage	43.4%	25.7%	18%
- Seatwise Result Map of the election

- Structure of the Odisha Legislative Assembly after the election
Chief Minister before election
Naveen Patnaik
BJD
Elected Chief Minister
Naveen Patnaik
BJD

The 2014 Odisha Legislative Assembly election was held in April 2014, concurrently with the general election. The elections were held in the state in two phases. The results were declared on 16 May 2014.

The ruling party, Biju Janata Dal, upon gaining majority of seats formed the government again, with incumbent Chief Minister Naveen Patnaik, continuing office for another term.

The nominee for CM from the then BJP was Kanaka Vardhan Singhdeo. Perhaps only this time had Orissa BJP declared its CM face pre-poll.

== Results ==
Source: Election Commission of India
Party			Popular vote			Seats		
Flag	Name	Symbol	Votes	%	±pp	Contested	Won	+/−
	Biju Janata Dal		9,335,159	43.35	▲4.49	147	117	▲14
	Indian National Congress		5,535,670	25.71	▼3.39	147	16	▼11
	Bharatiya Janata Party		3,874,748	17.99	▲2.94	147	10	▲4
	Communist Party of India (Marxist)		80,274	0.37	▼0.14	12	1	▲1
-	Samata Kranti Dal		86,539	0.40	(new)	51	1	(new)
-	Independents	-	10,84,764	5.04	▼3.61	276	2	▼4
-	NOTA	-	271,336	1.26	(new)			
Total			-	100	-	-	147	-
Valid Votes (Note: including NOTA)			21,532,680	73.75				
Invalid Votes			14,166	-				
Total Votes polled / turnout			21,546,846	73.80				
Abstentation			7,649,201	-				
Total No. of Electors			29,196,047					

== Results by regions & districts ==
=== Results by regions ===
District	Seats				
District	Seats	BJD	INC	BJP	OTH
Northern Odisha (Note: Northern Division includes Sambalpur, Deogarh, Jharsuguda, Bargarh, Bolangir, Sonepur, Sundargarh, Dhenkanal, Angul, and Keonjhar districts)	41	27	5	6	3
Central Odisha (Note: Central Division includes Cuttack, Jagatsinghpur, Kendrapada, Jajpur, Balasore, Bhadrak, Puri, Khordha, Nayagarh, and Mayurbhanj districts)	65	58	4	2	1
Southern Odisha (Note: Southern Division includes Ganjam, Gajapati, Koraput, Nabarangpur, Rayagada, Malkangiri, Kalahandi, Nuapada, Kandhamal, and Boudh districts)	41	32	7	2	0
Total	147	117	16	10	4

=== Results by districts ===
District	Seats				
District	Seats	BJD	INC	BJP	OTH
Angul	5	5	—N/a	—N/a	—N/a
Balangir	5	3	1	1	—N/a
Balasore	8	7	—N/a	1	—N/a
Bargarh	5	3	1	1	—N/a
Bhadrak	5	5	—N/a	—N/a	—N/a
Boudh	2	2	—N/a	—N/a	—N/a
Cuttack	9	8	1	—N/a	—N/a
Deogarh	1	—N/a	—N/a	1	—N/a
Dhenkanal	4	4	—N/a	—N/a	—N/a
Gajapati	2	1	1	—N/a	—N/a
Ganjam	13	13	—N/a	—N/a	—N/a
Jagatsinghpur	4	3	1	—N/a	—N/a
Jajpur	7	7	—N/a	—N/a	—N/a
Jharsuguda	2	—N/a	1	1	—N/a
Kalahandi	5	5	—N/a	—N/a	—N/a
Kandhamal	3	2	1	—N/a	—N/a
Kendrapara	5	3	2	—N/a	—N/a
Keonjhar	6	5	1	—N/a	—N/a
Khurda	8	7	—N/a	1	—N/a
Koraput	5	1	4	—N/a	—N/a
Malkangiri	2	2	—N/a	—N/a	—N/a
Mayurbhanj	9	9	—N/a	—N/a	—N/a
Nowrangpur	4	3	1	—N/a	—N/a
Nayagarh	4	4	—N/a	—N/a	—N/a
Nawapara	2	—N/a	—N/a	2	—N/a
Puri	6	5	—N/a	—N/a	1
Rayagada	3	3	—N/a	—N/a	—N/a
Sambalpur	4	3	—N/a	1	—N/a
Subarnapur	2	2	—N/a	—N/a	—N/a
Sundergarh	7	2	2	1	2
Total	147	117	16	10	4 (Note: The "OTH" category includes 2 Independents (winning in Keonjhar and Puri), 1 from the Communist Party of India (Marxist), and 1 from the Samata Kranti Dal (both winning in Sundargarh))

== Elected Members & Runners-Up ==
A.C. No.	Constituency	Winner	Party	Votes	Runner-up	Party	Votes	Margin
Bargarh District
1	Padmapur	Pradip Purohit	BJP	68942	Bijaya Ranjan Sing Bariha	BJD	64429	4513
2	Bijepur	Subal Sahu	INC	53920	Prasanna Acharya	BJD	52832	458
3	Bargarh	Debesh Acharya	BJD	59350	Sadhu Nepak	INC	46146	13204
4	Attabira (SC)	Snehangini Chhuria	BJD	69602	Nihar Ranjan Mahananda	INC	44128	25474
5	Bhatli	Susanta Singh	BJD	75077	Sushant Mishra	IND	37496	37581
Jharsuguda District
6	Brajarajnagar	Radharani Panda	BJP	50736	Anup Kumar Sai	BJD	43946	6790
7	Jharsuguda	Naba Kishore Das	INC	74499	Kishore Kumar Mohanty	BJD	62936	11563
Sundargarh District
8	Talsara (ST)	Prafulla Majhi	INC	45689	Binaya Toppo	BJD	44251	1438
9	Sundargarh (ST)	Jogesh Kumar Singh	INC	66138	Kusum Tete	BJD	53554	12584
10	Biramitrapur (ST)	George Tirkey	SKD	46114	Shankar Oram	BJP	34167	11947
11	Raghunathapali (SC)	Subrat Tarai	BJD	49074	Jagabandhu Behera	BJP	33033	16041
12	Rourkela	Dilip Ray	BJP	59653	Sarada Prasad Nayak	BJD	48724	10929
13	Rajgangpur (ST)	Mangala Kisan	BJD	54596	Gregory Minz	INC	44560	10046
14	Bonai (ST)	Laxman Munda	CPI(M)	39125	Dayanidhi Kishan	BJD	37307	1818
Sambalpur District
15	Kuchinda (ST)	Rabi Narayan Naik	BJP	68049	Bhubaneswar Kisan	BJD	46045	22064
16	Rengali (SC)	Ramesh Patua	BJD	47210	Nauri Nayak	BJP	45380	1830
17	Sambalpur	Raseswari Panigrahi	BJD	48362	Jayanarayan Mishra	BJP	39404	9958
18	Rairakhol	Rohit Pujari	BJD	53849	Assaf Ali Khan	INC	41940	11909
Deogarh District
19	Debagarh	Nitesh Gangadeb	BJP	89636	Anita Pradhan	BJD	50897	38739
Keonjhar District
20	Telkoi (ST)	Bedabyasa Nayak	BJD	66675	Dhanurjaya Sidu	INC	52721	13954
21	Ghasipura	Badri Narayan Patra	BJD	108900	Satyabrata Panda	BJP	20298	88602
22	Anandapur (SC)	Mayadhar Jena	BJD	82520	Jayadev Jena	INC	60296	22224
23	Patna (ST)	Hrushikesh Naik	BJD	44584	Bhabani Sankar Nayak	BJP	35741	8843
24	Keonjhar (ST)	Abhiram Naik	BJD	55959	Mohan Charan Majhi	BJP	47283	8676
25	Champua	Sanatan Mahakud	IND	69635	Kusha Apat	IND	54957	14678
Mayurbhanj District
26	Jashipur (ST)	Mangal Singh Mudi	BJD	39440	Shambhu Nath Naik	SUCI(C)	33646	5794
27	Saraskana (ST)	Bhadav Hansdah	BJD	46867	Ramachandra Murmu	JMM	43028	3839
28	Rairangpur (ST)	Sushil Kumar Hansdah	BJD	51062	Droupadi Murmu	BJP	35506	15556
29	Bangiriposi (ST)	Sudam Marndi	BJD	62406	Purusotam Naik	BJP	30877	31529
30	Karanjia (ST)	Bijay Kumar Naik	BJD	38609	Jyotsna Bhansingh	BJP	25058	13551
31	Udala (ST)	Golakabihari Naik	BJD	49628	Bhaskar Madhei	BJP	41099	8529
32	Betanoti (SC)	Ganeswar Patra	BJD	52694	Jaminikanta Naik	INC	35860	16834
33	Baripada (ST)	Sananda Marndi	BJD	54131	Nisamani Baske	BJP	37017	17114
34	Moroda	Prabin Chandra Bhanjdeo	BJD	52207	Rajkisore Das	BJP	45251	6956
Balasore District
35	Jaleswar	Aswini Kumar Patra	BJD	86084	Debiprasanna Chand	INC	52264	33860
36	Bhogorai	Ananta Das	BJD	76761	Satya Shiba Das	INC	57249	19512
37	Basta	Nityananda Sahoo	BJD	76737	Jay Narayan Mohanty	INC	70304	6433
38	Baleswar	Jiban Pratap Dash	BJD	47615	Madanmohan Dutta	BJP	37824	9791
39	Remuna	Gobinda Chandra Das	BJP	70973	Sudrasana Jena	BJD	57144	13829
40	Nilagiri	Sukanta Nayak	BJD	50514	Suśama Biswal	BJP	36814	13700
41	Soro (SC)	Parshu Ram Dhada	BJD	57139	Mrutyunjaya Jena	INC	52408	4911
42	Simulia	Jyoti Prakash Panigrahi	BJD	68584	Padma Lochan Panda	INC	57917	7937
Bhadrak District
43	Bhandaripokhari	Prafulla Samal	BJD	70173	Subrata Das	INC	36076	34097
44	Bhadrak	Jugal Kishore Patnaik	BJD	80582	Naren Palei	INC	56995	23587
45	Basudebapur	Bijayashree Routray	BJD	77281	Madhabananda Mallick	INC	71275	6506
46	Dhamanagar (SC)	Muktikanta Mandal	BJD	71538	Bishnucharan Sethi	BJP	62346	9192
47	Chandabali	Byomakesh Ray	BJD	68557	Amiya Mahapatra	INC	43674	24883
Jajpur District
48	Binjharpur (SC)	Pramila Mallik	BJD	74532	Babita Mallick	INC	36342	38190
49	Bari	Debasis Nayak	BJD	59800	Biswa Ranjan Mallick	IND	52627	7173
50	Barchana	Amar Prasad Satpathy	BJD	53322	Janmejoy Lenka	INC	36383	16939
51	Dharmasala	Pranab Kumar Balabantaray	BJD	109241	Srinath Mishra	INC	23455	85786
52	Jajapur	Pranab Prakash Das	BJD	104458	Santosh Nanda	INC	19845	84613
53	Korei	Akash Dasnayak	BJD	73966	Biswajeet Nayak	INC	31099	42867
54	Sukinda	Pritiranjan Gharai	BJD	58122	Sarat Raut	INC	53418	4704
Dhenkanal District
55	Dhenkanal	Sudhira Samal	BJD	69083	Krushna Chandra Patra	BJP	65789	3294
56	Hindol (SC)	Simarani Nayak	BJD	84351	Laxmidhar Behara	BJP	33852	50499
57	Kamakhyanagar	Prafulla Kumar Mallik	BJD	64153	Bhabani Sankar Mohapatra	INC	47282	16881
58	Parjanga	Nrusingha Charan Sahu	BJD	60523	Bibhuti Bhusan Pradhan	BJP	57471	3052
Angul District
59	Pallahara	Mahesh Sahoo	BJD	44264	Ashok Mohanty	BJP	38970	5294
60	Talcher	Braja Kishore Pradhan	BJD	56465	Kalindicharan Samal	BJP	42143	14322
61	Angul	Rajanikant Singh	BJD	72379	Pratap Chandra Pradhan	INC	52036	20343
62	Chhendipada (SC)	Susanta Behera	BJD	62035	Agasti Behera	INC	52228	9807
63	Athamallik	Sanjib Sahoo	BJD	63226	Surendra Pradhan	INC	43693	19533
Subarnapur District
64	Birmaharajpur (SC)	Padmanabha Behera	BJD	67772	Ananda Barik	BJP	36484	31290
65	Subarnapur	Niranjan Pujari	BJD	93534	Pramod Mohapatra	BJP	42079	51485
Balangir District
66	Loisinga (SC)	Jogendra Behera	BJD	64340	Pandaba Chandra Kumbhar	INC	41486	22854
67	Patanagarh	Kanak Vardhan Singh Deo	BJP	74372	Prakruti Debi Singh Deo	BJD	60719	13653
68	Bolangir	Narasingha Mishra	INC	61730	Anaga Udaya Singh Deo	BJD	49746	12254
69	Titilagarh	Tukuni Sahu	BJD	71858	Surendra Singh Bhoi	INC	57836	14022
70	Kantabanji	Ayyub Khan	BJD	55252	Santosh Singh Saluja	INC	51384	3868
Nuapada District
71	Nuapada	Basanta Panda	BJP	55817	Rajendra Dholakia	BJD	46207	9610
72	Khariar	Durjyodhan Majhi	BJP	57533	Adhiraj Mohan Panigrahi	INC	50407	7126
Nabarangpur District
73	Umarkote (ST)	Subhash Gond	BJD	50500	Jathindra Gond	INC	39978	10522
74	Jharigam (ST)	Prakash Chandra Majhi	BJD	65254	Uldhar Majhi	INC	54058	11196
75	Nabarangpur (ST)	Manohar Randhari	BJD	76659	Sadan Nayak	INC	65270	11389
76	Dabugam (ST)	Bhujabal Majhi	INC	62957	Motiram Nayak	BJD	56860	6097
Kalahandi District
77	Lanjigarh (ST)	Balabhadra Majhi	BJD	65033	Pradip Kumar Dishari	INC	40138	24859
78	Junagarh	Dibya Sankar Mishra	BJD	56443	Anil Singh Deo	BJP	44498	9945
79	Dharmagarh	Puspendra Singh Deo	BJD	59931	Rabindra Patajosi	BJP	43773	16158
80	Bhabanipatana (SC)	Anam Naik	BJD	54825	Dusmanta Naik	INC	44011	10814
81	Narla	Dhaneswar Majhi	BJD	56783	Jagannath Pattnayak	INC	41015	15768
Kandhamal District
82	Baliguda	Rajib Patra	BJD	37606	Kiesa Pradhan	INC	34910	2696
83	Ghumusur Udayagiri (ST)	Jacob Pradhan	INC	48958	Pradeep Kumar Pradhan	BJD	38689	10289
84	Phulbani (ST)	Duguni Kanhar	BJD	58273	Debanarayan Pradhan	BJP	32478	25795
Boudh District
85	Kantamal	Mahidhar Rana	BJD	49202	Harinarayana Pradhan	INC	23836	25366
86	Boudh	Pradip Kumar Amat	BJD	54618	Susanta Kumar Pradhan	INC	43470	11148
Cuttack District
87	Baramba	Debiprasad Mishra	BJD	91772	Laxmi Debi	INC	23761	68011
88	Banki	Pravat Tripathy	BJD	85809	Rabindra Mallick	INC	42051	43758
89	Athagarh	Ranendra Pratap Swain	BJD	102605	Bichitrananda Muduli	INC	34118	68487
90	Cuttack City	Debashish Samantaray	BJD	57633	Mohammed Moquim	INC	43335	14298
91	Choudwar	Pravat Ranjan Biswal	BJD	70880	Suresh Mohapatra	INC	29495	41385
92	Niali (SC)	Pramod Kumar Mallick	BJD	88119	Chhabi Malik	INC	62310	25809
93	Cuttack Sadar (SC)	Chandra Sarathi Behera	BJD	71247	Dilip Mallick	BJP	45456	25791
94	Salipur	Prakash Chandra Behera	INC	78343	Prasanta Behera	BJD	76226	2117
95	Mahanga	Pratap Jena	BJD	89531	Sarada Prasad Padhan	IND	61657	27874
Kendrapara District
96	Patkura	Bed Prakash Agrawal	BJD	89853	Jayanta Mohanty	INC	42138	47715
97	Kendrapara (SC)	Kishore Chandra Tarai	BJD	65037	Ganeswar Behera	INC	59606	5431
98	Aul	Debendra Sarma	INC	81254	Pratap Keshari Deb	BJD	77751	3503
99	Rajanagar	Ansuman Mohanty	INC	76806	Dhruba Charan Sahoo	BJD	60518	18408
100	Mahakalapada	Atanu Sabyasachi Nayak	BJD	81050	Bijaya Mohapatra	BJP	57804	23246
Jagatsinghpur District
101	Paradeep	Damodar Rout	BJD	85206	Arindam Sarkhel	INC	46606	38600
102	Tirtol (SC)	Rajashree Mallick	BJD	88953	Rajakisor Behara	INC	53505	35448
103	Balikuda-Erasama	Prasanta Muduli	BJD	69335	Lalatendu Mohapatra	INC	39981	29354
104	Jagatsingpur	Chiranjib Biswal	INC	67067	Bishnu Charan Das	BJD	64179	2888
Puri District
105	Kakatapur (SC)	Surendra Sethy	BJD	89963	Biswa Bhusan Das	INC	48993	41030
106	Nimapara	Samir Ranjan Dash	BJD	86598	Pravati Parida	BJP	57321	29637
107	Puri	Maheswar Mohanty	BJD	76760	Uma Ballav Rath	INC	42039	34721
108	Bramhagiri	Sanjaya Kumar Das Burma	BJD	78982	Lalitendu Bidyadhar Mohapatra	INC	78334	1648
109	Satyabadi	Umakanta Samantaray	IND	48319	Rama Ranjan Baliarsingh	BJD	46787	1532
110	Pipili	Pradeep Maharathy	BJD	82550	Judhistira Samantaray	INC	49076	33474
Khurda District
111	Jayadeb (SC)	Sasi Bhusan Behera	BJD	69367	Naba Kishor Mallick	INC	28366	40951
112	Bhubaneswar Central	Bijaya Mohanty	BJD	50107	Jagannath Pradhan	BJP	27718	22389
113	Bhubaneswar North	Priyadarsi Mishra	BJD	73278	Dilip Mohanty	BJP	24971	48757
114	Ekamra Bhubaneswar	Ashok Chandra Panda	BJD	66376	Amiya Dash	BJP	29900	36457
115	Jatani	Bhagirathi Bhadajena	BJD	60976	Suresh Kumar Routray	INC	55229	5747
116	Begunia	Prasanta Kumar Jagadev	BJD	73984	Pradeep Sahoo	AOP	30559	43425
117	Khorda	Rajendra Kumar Sahoo	BJD	72299	Jyotirindra Nath Mitra	BJP	65702	6597
118	Chilika	Bibhutibhusan Harichandran	BJP	69433	Raghunath Sahu	BJD	68892	541
Nayagarh District
119	Ranpur	Rabinarayan Mohapatra	BJD	60705	Surama Padhy	BJP	44279	16426
120	Khandapada	Anubhav Patnaik	BJD	62257	Soumya Ranjan Patnaik	AOP	61656	601
121	Daspalla (SC)	Purna Chandra Nayak	BJD	75832	Indumati Nayak	INC	18505	57327
122	Nayagarh	Arun Kumar Sahoo	BJD	75538	Manoj Ray	INC	54671	20867
Ganjam District
123	Bhanjanagar	Bikram Keshari Arukha	BJD	82467	Binayak Tripathy	INC	50766	31701
124	Polosara	Srikanta Sahu	BJD	66766	Gokula Nanda Mallik	INC	45549	21217
125	Kabisurjyanagar	Suguna Kumari Deo	BJD	67161	Hara Prasad Sahu	IND	45661	21500
126	Khalikote (SC)	Purnachandra Sethy	BJD	78845	Pandaba Jalli	INC	21651	57194
127	Chhatrapur (SC)	Priyansu Pradhan	BJD	53221	Krushna Chandra Nayak	CPI	31202	22019
128	Asika	Debaraj Mohanty	BJD	59412	Debaraj Mohanty	INC	35913	23499
129	Surada	Purna Chandra Swain	BJD	67546	Basanta Bisoyi	INC	51546	16000
130	Sanakhemundi	Nandini Devi	BJD	61773	Ramesh Chandra Jena	INC	53551	8222
131	Hinjili	Naveen Patnaik	BJD	89267	Sibaram Patra	INC	12681	76586
132	Gopalpur	Pradeep Kumar Panigrahy	BJD	55265	Bibhuti Bhusan Jena	BJP	35153	20112
133	Berhampur	Ramesh Chandra Chyau Patnaik	BJD	43211	Bikram Kumar Panda	INC	42172	1039
134	Digapahandi	Surjya Narayana Patra	BJD	78949	S. Sujith Kumar	INC	33052	45897
135	Chikiti	Usha Devi	BJD	74849	Manoranjan Dyan Samantara	INC	42701	32148
Gajapati District
136	Mohana (ST)	Basanti Mallick	BJD	43006	Dasarathi Gomango	INC	42891	115
137	Paralakhemundi	K. Surya Rao	INC	61014	K. Narayana Rao	BJD	59595	1419
Rayagada District
138	Gunupur (ST)	Trinatha Gomango	BJD	59527	Purusottam Gomango	INC	52141	7386
139	Bissam Cuttack (ST)	Jagannath Saraka	BJD	72366	Dambarudhar Ulaka	INC	43180	29186
140	Rayagada (ST)	Lal Bihari Himirika	BJD	69629	Makaranda Muduli	INC	61343	8286
Koraput District
141	Lakhmipur (ST)	Kailash Chandra Kulesika	INC	53429	Hema Gamang	BJD	30956	22473
142	Kotpad (ST)	Chandra Sekhar Majhi	INC	71018	Ashok Pangi	BJD	39697	31321
143	Jeypore	Tara Prasad Bahinipati	INC	65738	Rabi Narayan Nanda	BJD	57011	8367
144	Koraput (SC)	Krushna Chandra Sagaria	INC	50672	Raghuram Machha	BJD	45696	4976
145	Pottangi (ST)	Prafulla Pangi	BJD	46839	Rama Chandra Kadam	INC	36075	10764
Malkangiri District
146	Malkangiri (ST)	Manasa Madkami	BJD	47737	Mala Madhi	INC	44425	3312
147	Chitrakonda (ST)	Dambaru Sisa	BJD	48000	Sunadhar Kakari	INC	23270	24730

== See also ==
- 2014 elections in India
- Elections in Odisha
