= 2019 Odisha Legislative Assembly election =

- 11–29 April 2019

All 147 Assembly Constituencies 74 seats needed for a majority
- Registered: 3,22,52,383 (▲10.47%)
- Turnout: 72.92% (▼0.73pp)
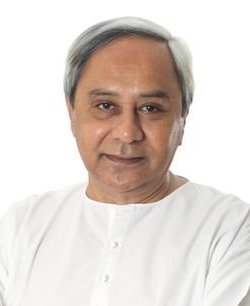

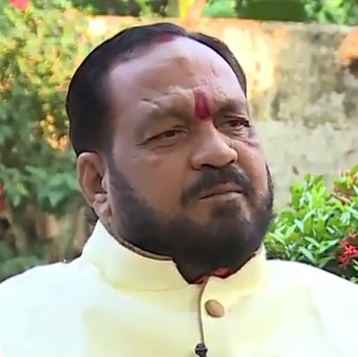

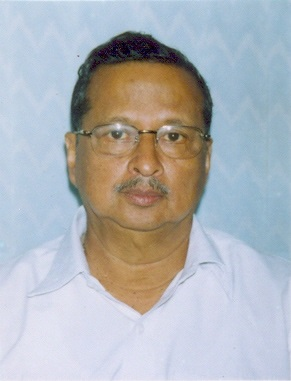
	Majority party	Minority party	Third party
Leader	Naveen Patnaik	Basanta Kumar Panda	Niranjan Patnaik
Party	BJD	BJP	INC
Alliance		NDA	UPA
Leader since	1996	2016	2018
Leader's seat	Hinjili (won) & Bijepur (won)	Elected to Lok Sabha	Ghasipura & Bhandaripokhari (lost)
Seats before	117	10	16
Seats won	112	23	9
Seat change	▼5	▲13	▼7
Popular vote	1,04,75,697	76,12,449	37,77,645
Percentage	44.71%	32.49%	16.12%
Swing	▲1.3 pp	▲14.5 pp	▼9.6 pp

- Structure of the Odisha Legislative Assembly after the election
Chief Minister before election
Naveen Patnaik
BJD
Chief Minister after election
Naveen Patnaik
BJD

The 2019 Odisha assembly election, held between April 11 and April 29, was the 16th quinquennial legislative assembly election to elect 147 MLAs to the 16th legislative assembly of Odisha. Covering 147 constituencies across four phases, the polls coincided with the Lok Sabha elections. Vote counting for the assembly election took place on May 23, concluding before the previous Odisha Assembly's term expiration on June 11.

Naveen Patnaik, serving as the Chief Minister of Odisha, achieved a fifth consecutive term in office as the Biju Janata Dal (BJD), the political party he leads, emerged victorious in the electoral contest. The election witnessed a keen competition with the Bharatiya Janata Party (BJP), a former ally, vigorously campaigning and making notable inroads into the coastal state.

2019 Indian general election in the 21 constituencies of Odisha and 2019 Odisha Legislative Assembly election was held in the first 4 phases of the 7 scheduled phases of 2019 Indian general election.

== Election schedule ==
On March 10, the Election Commission of India announced the dates of the election. 2019 Odisha Legislative Assembly election are scheduled to be held simultaneously with 2019 Indian general election in 4 phases: April 11, 18, 23, and 29. The counting of votes will be on May 23.

Elections were cancelled in Patkura Assembly constituency following the death of 83-year-old, six-time MLA and Biju Janata Dal candidate Bed Prakash Agarwalla. Later the Election Commission of India scheduled it on 19 May 2019. The Election Commission of India further decided to extend the completion of the election for 60 days in view of the devastation caused by Cyclone Fani. The poll was done in July 2019.

== Results ==
=== Partywise election results summary ===
Source: Election Commission of India (Note: Data Includes 96 Patkura Assembly Seat)
Party			Popular vote			Seats
Name	Votes	%	±pp	Contested	Won	+/−
Biju Janata Dal	10,571,727	44.78	▲2.0	147	113	▼4
Bharatiya Janata Party	7,690,581	32.58	▲15.4	147	23	▲13
Indian National Congress	3,779,751	16.01	▼9.77	138	9	▼7
Communist Party of India (Marxist)	70,119	0.3	▼0.1	5	1	Steady
Independents	662,358	2.80	▼2.20	302	1	▲2
NOTA	245,425	1.04	▼0.22			
Total	-	100	-	-	147	-
Valid Votes (Note: including NOTA)			23,606,647	72.64		
Invalid Votes			181,728	-		
Total Votes polled / turnout			23,788,375	73.20		
Abstentation			8,709,387	-		
Total No. of Electors			32,497,130			

=== Results by regions ===
Region	Seats				
Region	Seats	BJD	BJP	INC	OTH
Northern Odisha (Note: Northern Division includes Sambalpur, Deogarh, Jharsuguda, Bargarh, Bolangir, Sonepur, Sundargarh, Dhenkanal, Angul, and Keonjhar districts)	41	29	8	3	1
Central Odisha (Note: Central Division includes Cuttack, Jagatsinghpur, Kendrapada, Jajpur, Balasore, Bhadrak, Puri, Khordha, Nayagarh, and Mayurbhanj districts)	65	52	11	2	0
Southern Odisha (Note: Southern Division includes Ganjam, Gajapati, Koraput, Nabarangpur, Rayagada, Malkangiri, Kalahandi, Nuapada, Kandhamal, and Boudh districts)	41	32	4	4	1
Total	147	113	23	9	2

=== Results by districts ===
District	Seats				
District	Seats	BJD	BJP	INC	OTH
Angul	5	5	—N/a	—N/a	—N/a
Balasore	8	6	2	—N/a	—N/a
Bargarh	5	5	—N/a	—N/a	—N/a
Bhadrak	5	4	1	—N/a	—N/a
Balangir	5	2	1	2	—N/a
Boudh	2	2	—N/a	—N/a	—N/a
Cuttack	9	8	—N/a	1	—N/a
Deogarh	1	—N/a	1	—N/a	—N/a
Dhenkanal	4	4	—N/a	—N/a	—N/a
Gajapati	2	—N/a	1	1	—N/a
Ganjam	13	12	—N/a	1	—N/a
Jagatsinghpur	4	4	—N/a	—N/a	—N/a
Jajpur	7	7	—N/a	—N/a	—N/a
Jharsuguda	2	2	—N/a	—N/a	—N/a
Kalahandi	5	4	1	—N/a	—N/a
Kandhamal	3	3	—N/a	—N/a	—N/a
Kendrapara	5	5	—N/a	—N/a	—N/a
Keonjhar	6	5	1	—N/a	—N/a
Khordha	8	7	—N/a	1	—N/a
Koraput	5	4	—N/a	1	—N/a
Malkangiri	2	1	1	—N/a	—N/a
Mayurbhanj	9	3	6	—N/a	—N/a
Nowrangpur	4	3	1	—N/a	—N/a
Nayagarh	4	4	—N/a	—N/a	—N/a
Nawapara	2	1	—N/a	1	—N/a
Puri	6	4	2	—N/a	—N/a
Rayagada	3	2	—N/a	—N/a	1
Sambalpur	4	2	2	—N/a	—N/a
Subarnapur	2	2	—N/a	—N/a	—N/a
Sundergarh	7	2	3	1	1
Total	147	113	23	9	2 (Note: The two seats won by "OTH" belong to the Communist Party of India (Marxist), which won the Bonai constituency in Sundargarh, and an independent candidate, who won the Rayagada constituency in the Rayagada district)

== Elected Members and Runners-up ==
Results table
Constituency		Winner				Runner Up				Margin
No.	Name	Candidate	Party	Votes	%	Candidate	Party	Votes	%	Margin
Bargarh District
1	Padmapur	Bijaya Ranjan Singh Bariha	BJD	83,299	41.29	Pradip Purohit	BJP	77,565	38.45	5,734
2	Bijepur	Nabin Patnaik	BJD	110,604	59.78	Sanat Kumar Gupta	BJP	53,482	28.91	57,122
3	Bargarh	Debesh Acharjya	BJD	75,133	46.48	Aswini Kumar Sarangi	BJP	66,681	41.25	8,452
4	Attabira (SC)	Snehangini Chhuria	BJD	84,010	48.98	Milan Seth	BJP	61,614	35.92	22,396
5	Bhatli	Susanta Singh	BJD	98,666	53.04	Irasis Acharya	BJP	75,434	40.55	23,232
Jharsuguda District
6	Brajarajnagar	Kishore Kumar Mohanty	BJD	80,152	48.70	Radharani Panda	BJP	68,518	41.63	11,634
7	Jharsuguda	Naba Kisore Das	BJD	98,620	55.97	Dinesh Kumar Jain	BJP	52,921	30.04	45,699
Sundargarh District
8	Talsara (ST)	Bhabani Shankar Bhoi	BJP	60,264	39.31	Stephen Wilson Soreng	BJD	44,076	28.75	16,188
9	Sundargarh (ST)	Kusum Tete	BJP	83,118	47.67	Jogesh Kumar Singh	BJD	75,754	43.45	7,364
10	Biramitrapur (ST)	Shankar Oram	BJP	60,937	34.66	Makhlu Ekka	BJD	44,586	25.36	16,351
11	Raghunathpali (SC)	Subrat Tarai	BJD	44,815	40.99	Jagabandhu Behera	BJP	40,131	36.71	4,684
12	Rourkela	Sarada Prasad Nayak	BJD	60,705	47.29	Nihar Ray	BJP	50,275	39.17	10,430
13	Rajgangpur (ST)	C. S. Raazen Ekka	INC	53,918	30.98	Mangala Kisan	BJD	52,972	30.44	946
14	Bonai (ST)	Laxman Munda	CPM	59,939	34.67	Ranjit Kishan	BJD	47,909	27.71	12,030
Sambalpur District
15	Kuchinda (ST)	Kishore Chandra Naik	BJD	72,601	41.71	Rabi Narayan Naik	BJP	69,093	39.69	3,508
16	Rengali (SC)	Nauri Nayak	BJP	74,077	47.56	Reena Tanty	BJD	67,334	43.23	6,743
17	Sambalpur	Jayanarayan Mishra	BJP	57,349	44.53	Dr. Raeswari Panigrahi	BJD	52,969	41.13	4,380
18	Rairakhol	Rohit Pujari	BJD	57,111	37.94	Assaf Ali Khan	INC	42,479	28.22	14,632
Deogarh District
19	Debagarh	Subash Chandra Panigrahi	BJP	74,355	41.52	Romanch Ranjan Biswal	BJD	67,249	37.56	7,106
Keonjhar District
20	Telkoi (ST)	Premananda Nayak	BJD	74,148	41.98	Dhanurjaya Sidu	BJP	68,228	38.63	5,920
21	Ghasipura	Badri Narayan Patra	BJD	86,816	49.98	Niranjan Patnaik	INC	54,128	31.16	32,688
22	Anandapur (SC)	Bhagirathi Sethy	BJD	89,850	52.72	Jayadev Jena	INC	45,657	26.79	44,193
23	Swampatana (ST)	Jagannath Naik	BJD	70,310	43.72	Bhabani Sankar Nayak	BJP	62,514	38.87	7,796
24	Keonjhar (ST)	Mohan Charan Majhi	BJP	72,760	42.10	Madhaba Sadar	BJD	71,636	41.45	1,124
25	Champua	Minakshi Mahanta	BJD	89,525	53.02	Murali Manohar Sharma	BJP	63,117	37.38	26,408
Mayurbhanj District
26	Jashipur (ST)	Ganeshram Khuntia	BJP	58,708	36.67	Golakbihari Nayak	BJD	50,156	31.32	8,552
27	Saraskana (ST)	Dr. Budhan Murmu	BJP	53,197	34.28	Amar Singh Tudu	BJD	46,384	29.89	6,813
28	Rairangpur (ST)	Naba Charan Majhi	BJP	60,901	37.31	Basanti Marndi	BJD	58,054	35.56	2,847
29	Bangiriposi (ST)	Sudam Marndi	BJD	72,050	42.91	Sugda Murmu	BJP	60,206	35.86	11,844
30	Karanjia (ST)	Basanti Hembram	BJD	60,064	42.65	Padma Charan Haiburu	BJP	51,301	36.43	8,763
31	Udala (ST)	Bhaskar Madhei	BJP	69,725	45.48	Srinath Soren	BJD	68,292	44.55	1,433
32	Betanoti (SC)	Sanatan Bijuli	BJP	69,072	46.99	Brundaban Das	BJD	57,933	39.43	11,119
33	Baripada (ST)	Prakash Soren	BJP	72,225	45.08	Sarojini Hembram	BJD	52,814	32.96	19,411
34	Morada	Rajkishore Das	BJD	68,551	38.23	Krushna Chandra Mohapatra	BJP	61,847	34.49	6,704
Balasore District
35	Jaleswar	Aswini Kumar Patra	BJD	85,435	48.38	Jaynarayan Mohanty	BJP	49,992	28.31	35,443
36	Bhogorai	Ananta Das	BJD	76,796	46.79	Satya Shiba Das	INC	59,921	36.51	16,875
37	Basta	Nityananda Sahoo	BJD	71,737	41.96	Bijan Nayak	INC	59,873	35.02	11,864
38	Baleswar	Madanmohan Dutta	BJP	74,815	47.26	Jiban Pradip Dash	BJD	61,409	38.79	13,406
39	Remuna	Sudhanshu Shekhar Parida	BJD	79,097	47.50	Gobinda Chandra Das	BJP	74,979	45.02	4,118
40	Nilagiri	Sukanta Nayak	BJP	69,517	44.34	Santosh Khatua	BJD	67,940	43.33	1,577
41	Soro (SC)	Parshu Ram Dhada	BJD	54,775	35.70	Rakesh Kumar Malik	BJP	49,839	32.48	4,936
42	Simulia	Jyoti Prakash Panigrahi	BJD	90,083	51.35	Padmalochan Panda	BJP	75,124	42.82	14,959
Bhadrak District
43	Bhandaripokhari	Prafulla Samal	BJD	70,180	40.40	Niranjan Patnaik	INC	61,321	35.38	8,859
44	Bhadrak	Sanjib Kumar Mallick	BJD	93,668	52.07	Dr. Pradip Nayak	BJP	60,279	33.51	33,389
45	Basudebapur	Bishnubrata Routray	BJD	78,963	42.37	Ashok Kumar Das	INC	69,382	37.23	9,581
46	Dhamanagar (SC)	Bishnu Charan Sethi	BJP	80,111	48.47	Rajendra Kumar Das	BJD	75,486	45.67	4,625
47	Chandabali	Byomakesh Ray	BJD	77,313	43.11	Manmohan Samal	BJP	69,233	38.60	8,080
Jajpur District
48	Binjharpur (SC)	Pramila Mallik	BJD	79,087	55.18	Babita Mallick	BJP	57,861	40.37	21,226
49	Bari	Sunanda Das	BJD	72,559	48.28	Biswaranjan Mallick	BJP	68,497	45.58	4,062
50	Barchana	Amar Prasad Satpathy	BJD	64,084	46.64	Amar Kumar Nayak	BJP	62,599	45.55	1,485
51	Dharmasala	Pranab Kumar Balabantaray	BJD	101,364	58.61	Ramesh Chandra Parida	BJP	48,625	28.12	52,739
52	Jajapur	Pranab Prakash Das	BJD	99,738	60.24	Goutam Ray	BJP	59,082	35.68	40,656
53	Korei	Ashok Kumar Bal	BJD	73,403	49.60	Biswajeet Nayak	BJP	42,679	28.84	30,724
54	Sukinda	Pritiranjan Gharai	BJD	77,510	48.20	Pradeep Bal Samanta	BJP	60,780	37.79	16,730
Dhenkanal District
55	Dhenkanal	Sudhir Kumar Samal	BJD	89,536	46.92	Krushna Chandra Patra	BJP	68,896	36.11	20,640
56	Hindol (SC)	Simarani Nayak	BJD	93,980	50.93	Ashok Kumar Nayak	BJP	75,075	40.69	18,905
57	Kamakhyanagar	Prafulla Kumar Mallik	BJD	81,695	51.58	Satrughan Jena	BJP	65,186	41.16	16,509
58	Porjanga	Nrusingha Charan Sahu	BJD	78,747	46.93	Bibhuti Bhusan Pradhan	BJP	78,007	46.49	740
Angul District
59	Pallahara	Mukesh Kumar Pal	BJD	59,350	43.12	Ashok Mohanty	BJP	53,136	38.61	6,214
60	Talcher	Brajakisore Pradhan	BJD	70,044	54.89	Kalandi Charan Samal	BJP	45,942	36.00	24,102
61	Anugul	Rajanikant Singh	BJD	65,388	41.36	Pratap Chandra Pradhan	BJP	56,565	35.78	8,823
62	Chhendipada (SC)	Susanta Kumar Behera	BJD	74,911	45.39	Agasti Behera	BJP	68,117	41.27	6,794
63	Athamallik	Ramesh Chandra Sai	BJD	86,254	53.57	Bhagirathi Pradhan	BJP	39,070	24.26	47,184
Subarnapur District
64	Birmaharajpur (SC)	Padmanabha Behera	BJD	65,202	39.07	Raghunath Jagadala	BJP	52,145	31.25	13,057
65	Subarnapur	Niranjan Pujari	BJD	99,073	48.78	Ashok Kumar Pujari	BJP	73,347	36.11	25,726
Balangir District
66	Loisinga (SC)	Mukesha Mahalinga	BJP	71,261	39.82	Pradeep Behera	BJD	57,593	32.18	13,668
67	Patanagarh	Saroj Kumar Meher	BJD	88,533	43.45	Kanak Vardhan Singh Deo	BJP	77,374	37.97	11,159
68	Bolangir	Narasingha Mishra	INC	71,598	41.32	Arkesh Narayan Sing Deo	BJD	66,257	38.24	5,341
69	Titilagarh	Tukuni Sahu	BJD	73,284	39.79	Sunrendra Sing Bhoi	INC	53,647	29.12	19,637
70	Kantabanji	Santosh Singh Saluja	INC	64,246	33.60	Laxman Bag	BJP	64,118	33.53	128
Nuapada District
71	Nuapada	Rajendra Dholakia	BJD	65,647	39.75	Ghasi Ram Majhi	INC	45,317	27.44	20,330
72	Khariar	Adhiraj Mohan Panigrahi	INC	59,308	33.52	Lambodar Nial	BJD	56,451	31.90	2,857
Nabarangpur District
73	Umarkote (ST)	Nityananda Gond	BJP	59,895	39.12	Subash Gond	BJD	49,973	32.64	9,922
74	Jharigam (ST)	Prakash Chandra Majhi	BJD	77,881	44.58	Uldhar Majhi	INC	46,511	26.62	31,370
75	Nabarangapur (ST)	Sadasiba Pradhani	BJD	64,901	34.56	Gouri Sankar Majhi	BJP	58,023	30.90	6,878
76	Dabugam (ST)	Manohar Randhari	BJD	73,264	44.43	Bhujabal Majhi	INC	65,901	39.97	7,363
Kalahandi District
77	Lanjigarh (ST)	Pradip Kumar Dishari	BJD	62,413	38.28	Sibaji Majhi	INC	48,105	29.50	14,308
78	Junagarh	Dibya Shankar Mishra	BJD	83,789	45.83	Manoj Kumar Meher	BJP	55,930	30.59	27,859
79	Dharmagarh	Mousadhi Bag	BJD	68,291	34.75	Ananta Pratap Deo	BJP	52,193	26.56	16,098
80	Bhabanipatana (SC)	Pradipta Kumar Naik	BJP	63,063	38.31	Dusmanta Naik	BJD	58,379	35.46	4,684
81	Narla	Bhupendra Singh	BJD	53,264	31.12	Aniruddha Padhan	BJP	44,244	25.85	9,020
Kandhamal District
82	Baliguda	Chakramani Kanhar	BJD	43,175	39.23	Siman Mallick	INC	36,265	32.95	6,910
83	Ghumusar Udayagiri (ST)	Saluga Pradhan	BJD	53,238	38.61	Shyamaghana Pradhan	INC	41,977	30.45	11,261
84	Phulbani (ST)	Angada Kanhar	BJD	65,564	48.05	Debanarayana Pradhan	BJP	41,148	30.15	24,416
Boudh District
85	Kantamal	Mahidhar Rana	BJD	43,099	33.03	Kanhai Charan Danga	BJP	39,449	30.24	3,650
86	Boudh	Pradip Kumar Amat	BJD	61,536	49.83	Susanta Kumar Pradhan	BJP	51,088	41.37	10,448
Cuttack District
87	Baramba	Debiprasad Mishra	BJD	90,564	52.08	Bijaya Kumar Dalabehera	BJP	72,545	41.72	18,019
88	Banki	Devi Ranjan Tripathy	BJD	74,599	46.44	Debasis Patnaik	INC	50,481	31.43	24,118
89	Athagarh	Ranendra Pratap Swain	BJD	98,114	60.39	Brajendra Kumar Ray	BJP	40,119	24.69	57,995
90	Barabati-Cuttack	Mohammed Moquim	INC	50,244	37.57	Debashish Samantaray	BJD	46,417	34.71	3,827
91	Choudwar-Cuttack	Souvik Biswal	BJD	66,386	48.41	Nayan Kishore Mohanty	BJP	44,283	32.29	22,103
92	Niali (SC)	Dr. Pramod Kumar Mallick	BJD	94,013	53.65	Chhabi Malik	BJP	66,310	37.84	27,703
93	Cuttack Sadar (SC)	Chandra Sarathi Behera	BJD	86,329	55.41	Dilip Kumar Mallick	BJP	60,250	38.67	26,079
94	Salipur	Prasanta Behera	BJD	104,154	56.26	Prakash Chandra Behera	BJP	71,944	38.86	32,210
95	Mahanga	Pratap Jena	BJD	106,054	53.13	Sarada Prasad Padhan	BJP	76,469	38.31	29,585
Kendrapara District
96	Patkura	Sabitri Agarwalla	BJD	95,162	53.91	Bijoy Mohapatra	BJP	77,507	43.86	17,655
97	Kendrapara (SC)	Shashi Bhusan Behera	BJD	66,132	43.69	Ganeswar Behera	INC	59,547	39.34	6,585
98	Aali	Pratap Keshari Deb	BJD	99,837	57.67	Devendra Sharma	INC	43,986	25.41	55,851
99	Rajanagar	Dhruba Charan Sahoo	BJD	78,926	45.81	Anshuman Mohanty	INC	60,518	35.13	18,408
100	Mahakalapada	Atanu Sabyasachi Nayak	BJD	93,197	51.29	Bijay Pradhan	BJP	77,534	42.67	15,663
Jagatsinghpur District
101	Paradeep	Sambit Routray	BJD	69,871	44.73	Arindam Sarkhel	INC	48,879	31.29	20,992
102	Tirtol (SC)	Bishnu Charan Das	BJD	93,967	54.18	Ramakanta Bhoi	BJP	53,581	30.90	40,386
103	Balikuda-Erasama	Raghunandan Das	BJD	103,814	53.83	Lalatendu Mohapatra	INC	49,231	25.53	54,583
104	Jagatsingpur	Prasanta Kumar Muduli	BJD	70,116	43.29	Chiranjib Biswal	INC	61,474	37.95	8,642
Puri District
105	Kakatapur (SC)	Tusharkanti Behera	BJD	91,897	53.68	Biswa Bhusan Das	INC	46,206	26.99	45,691
106	Nimapara	Samir Ranjan Dash	BJD	91,160	48.96	Pravati Parida	BJP	59,152	31.77	32,008
107	Puri	Jayanta Kumar Sarangi	BJP	76,747	49.28	Maheswar Mohanty	BJD	72,739	46.71	4,008
108	Bramhagiri	Lalitendu Mohapatra	BJP	88,256	49.41	Sanjaya Kumar Dash Barma	BJD	86,126	48.22	2,130
109	Satyabadi	Umakanta Samantaray	BJD	80,537	51.45	Om Prakash Mishra	BJP	62,725	40.07	17,812
110	Pipili	Pradeep Maharathy	BJD	88,518	50.66	Ashrit Pattanayak	BJP	72,731	41.62	15,787
Khurda District
111	Jayadeb (SC)	Arabinda Dhali	BJD	63,000	44.72	Naba Kishor Mallick	Ind	44,300	31.45	18,700
112	Bhubaneswar Central	Ananta Narayana Jena	BJD	54,022	53.40	Jagannath Pradhan	BJP	42,580	42.09	11,442
113	Bhubaneswar North	Susanta Rout	BJD	71,193	54.84	Aparajita Mohanty	BJP	45,779	35.26	25,414
114	Ekamra Bhubaneswar	Ashok Chandra Panda	BJD	75,020	57.07	Babu Singh	BJP	46,363	35.27	28,657
115	Jatani	Suresh Kumar Routray	INC	68,895	42.93	Bibhuti Bhusan Balanbantaray	BJD	61,356	38.23	7,539
116	Begunia	Rajendra Kumar Sahoo	BJD	73,178	47.06	Pradeep Sahoo	INC	53,130	34.16	20,048
117	Khorda	Jyotirindra Nath Mitra	BJD	84,553	48.88	Kalucharan Khandeitray	BJP	74,510	43.07	10,043
118	Chilika	Prasanta Kumar Jagaddeb	BJD	80,133	50.29	Pruthibiraja Harichandran	BJP	69,277	43.48	10,856
Nayagarh District
119	Ranpur	Satyanarayan Pradhan	BJD	69,849	46.66	Surama Padhy	BJP	65,598	43.82	4,251
120	Khandapada	Soumya Ranjan Patnaik	BJD	100,038	74.34	Dusmanta Kumar Swain	Ind	18,608	13.83	81,430
121	Daspalla (SC)	Ramesh Chandra Behera	BJD	75,006	58.44	Purna Chandra Nayak	BJP	39,715	30.94	35,291
122	Nayagarh	Aruna Kumar Sahoo	BJD	81,592	52.41	Irani Ray	BJP	66,737	42.87	14,855
Ganjam District
123	Bhanjanagar	Bikram Keshari Arukha	BJD	76,879	48.56	Pradyumna Nayak	BJP	67,776	42.81	9,103
124	Polasara	Srikanta Sahu	BJD	80,463	50.39	Gokula Nanda Mallik	BJP	67,724	42.41	12,739
125	Kabisurjyanagar	Latika Pradhan	BJD	92,347	62.87	Ranjan Palei	BJP	43,319	29.49	49,028
126	Khalikote (SC)	Suryamani Baidya	BJD	86,105	59.95	Bharati Behera	BJP	44,560	31.02	41,545
127	Chhatrapur (SC)	Subash Chandra Behera	BJD	74,594	50.19	Prasanta Kumar Kar	BJP	53,543	36.02	21,051
128	Asika	Manjula Swain	BJD	66,872	55.50	Debaraj Mohanty	BJP	39,639	32.90	27,233
129	Surada	Purna Chandra Swain	BJD	76,501	50.29	Nilamani Bisoyi	BJP	62,505	41.09	13,996
130	Sanakhemundi	Ramesh Chandra Jena	INC	75,021	50.74	Nandini Debi	BJD	51,294	34.69	23,727
131	Hinjili	Nabeen Patnaik	BJD	94,065	66.32	Pitambar Acharya	BJP	33,905	23.91	60,160
132	Gopalpur	Dr. Pradeep Kumar Panigrahy	BJD	61,628	45.69	Bibhuti Bhusan Jena	BJP	58,955	43.71	2,673
133	Berhampur	Bikram Kumar Panda	BJD	68,113	57.27	Kanhu Charan Pati	BJP	32,629	27.44	35,484
134	Digapahandi	Tusharkanti Behera	BJD	75,016	54.66	Pinky Pradhan	BJP	34,564	25.19	40,452
135	Chikiti	Usha Devi	BJD	73,353	54.80	Manoranjan Dyan Samantara	BJP	52,718	39.39	20,635
Gajapati District
136	Mohana (ST)	Dasarathi Gomango	INC	53,705	32.75	Purnabasi Nayak	BJD	51,351	31.32	2,354
137	Paralakhemundi	Koduru Narayan Rao	BJP	52,415	35.92	Tirupati Panigrahi	Ind	37,080	25.41	15,335
Rayagada District
138	Gunupur (ST)	Raghunath Gomango	BJD	48,839	32.89	Purusottam Gomango	INC	42,569	28.67	6,270
139	Bissam-Cuttack (ST)	Jagannath Saraka	BJD	66,150	38.27	Nilamadhaba Hikaka	INC	52,818	30.56	13,332
140	Rayagada (ST)	Makaranda Muduli	Ind	52,844	30.21	Lal Bihari Himirika	BJD	47,974	27.42	4,870
Koraput District
141	Lakhmipur (ST)	Padmini Dian	BJD	45,211	34.02	Kailash Chandra Kulesika	INC	44,982	33.85	229
142	Kotpad (ST)	Atanu Sabyasachi Nayak	BJD	62,248	37.10	Chandra Sekhar Majhi	INC	59,617	35.53	2,631
143	Jayapur	Tara Prasad Bahinipati	INC	59,785	37.87	Rabi Narayan Nanda	BJD	54,334	34.42	5,451
144	Koraput (SC)	Raghu Ram Padal	BJD	48,171	35.19	Krushna Kuladip	INC	41,886	30.59	6,285
145	Pottangi (ST)	Pitam Padhi	BJD	51,244	35.41	Rama Chandra Kadam	INC	46,989	32.23	4,255
Malkangiri District
146	Malkangiri (ST)	Aditya Madhi	BJP	70,263	41.61	Mala Madhi	INC	44,694	26.46	25,569
147	Chitrakonda (ST)	Purna Chandra Baka	BJD	41,192	31.94	Laxmipriya Nayak	INC	38,647	29.96	2,545

* Election in Patkura Assembly constituency is due to be held.*

== Aftermath ==
Naveen Patnaik, the incumbent Chief Minister of Odisha, secured a fifth consecutive term in office as his party, the Biju Janata Dal (BJD), emerged victorious in the electoral battle. The BJP replaced the Congress as the principal opposition party, experiencing a notable surge in its vote share, which increased from around 18% to surpass the 30% mark.

== See also ==
- 2019 elections in India
- 2019 Indian general election
