= Begunia Assembly constituency =

Constituency of the Odisha legislative assembly in India

Coordinates: 20.20°N 85.45°E

Begunia
- Constituency No. 116 for the Odisha Legislative Assembly
- Begunia Assembly constituency in Khordha district

Constituency details
- Country: India
- Region: East India
- State: Odisha
- Division: Central Division
- District: Khordha
- Lok Sabha constituency: Bhubaneswar
- Established: 1957
- Total electors: 2,20,052 (Note: as on 2024) (Note: as data published by election commission)
- Reservation: None

Member of Legislative Assembly
- 17th Odisha Legislative Assembly
- Incumbent Pradip Kumar Sahu
- Party: Biju Janata Dal
- Elected year: 2024

Begunia is a Vidhan Sabha constituency of Khordha district, Odisha, India. This constituency includes Begunia block and Bologarh block.

Begunia is a block of Khordha district of the Indian state of Odisha. The distance from district headquarters is 18 km.

== Elected members ==
Vote share of winning candidates
2024	57.45%
2019	47.06%
2014	51.46%
2009	38.73%
2004	47.71%
2000	42.70%
1995 (bypoll)	59.79%
1995	45.85%
1990	58.80%
1985	59.99%
1980	47.08%
1977	34.49%

Since its formation in 1951, 18 elections were held till date including one bypoll in 1995.

List of members elected from Begunia constituency are:

Year	Member	Party
2024	Pradip Kumar Sahu	Biju Janata Dal
2019	Rajendra Kumar Sahoo	Biju Janata Dal
2014	Prasanta Kumar Jagadev	Biju Janata Dal
2009	Prashanta Nanda	Nationalist Congress Party
2004	Janaki Ballabh Patnaik	Indian National Congress
2000	Prashanta Nanda	Bharatiya Janata Party
1995 (bypoll) (Note: Resignation of Harihara Sahoo)	Janaki Ballabh Patnaik	Indian National Congress
1995	Harihara Sahoo	Indian National Congress
1990	Surendranath Mishra	Janata Dal
1985	Kailash Chandra Mohapatra	Indian National Congress
1980	Kailash Chandra Mohapatra	Indian National Congress (I)
1977	Chintamani Panigrahi	Indian National Congress
1974	Satyananda Champatiray	Utkal Congress
1971	Gangadhar Paikaray	Communist Party of India
1967	Gangadhar Paikaray	Communist Party of India
1961	Gangadhar Paikaray	Communist Party of India
1957	Satyananda Champatiray	Indian National Congress
1951	Gangadhar Paikaray	Communist Party of India

== Election results ==
=== 2024 ===
Voting were held on 25 May 2024 in 3rd phase of Odisha Assembly Election & 6th phase of Indian General Election. Counting of votes was on 4 June 2024. In 2024 election, Biju Janata Dal candidate Pradip Kumar Sahu defeated Bharatiya Janata Party candidate Prakasha Chandra Bijuli by a margin of 47,814 votes.

2024 Odisha Vidhan Sabha Election, Begunia
Party	Candidate	Votes	%	±%
BJD	Pradip Kumar Sahu	90,964	57.45	▲10.39
BJP	Prakasha Chandra Bijuli	43,150	27.25	▲10.32
INC	Pruthvi Ballav Patnaik	18,144	11.46	▼22.70
NOTA	None of the above	998	0.63	▲0.05
Majority		47,814	30.20	
Turnout		1,58,346	71.96	
BJD hold				

=== 2019 ===
In 2019 election, Biju Janata Dal candidate Rajendra Kumar Sahoo defeated Indian National Congress candidate Pradeep Kumar Sahoo by a margin of 20,048 votes.

2019 Vidhan Sabha Election, Begunia
Party	Candidate	Votes	%	±%
BJD	Rajendra Kumar Sahoo	73,178	47.06	▼4.40
INC	Pradeep Kumar Sahoo	53,130	34.16	▲19.77
BJP	Rhishav Nanda	26,321	16.93	▲9.55
NOTA	None of the above	909	0.58	
Majority		20,048	12.90	
Turnout		1,55,511	72.25	
BJD hold				

=== 2014 ===
In 2014 election, Biju Janata Dal candidate Prasanta Kumar Jagadev defeated Aama Odisha Party candidate Pradeep Kumar Sahoo by a margin of 43,425 votes.

2014 Vidhan Sabha Election, Begunia
Party	Candidate	Votes	%	±%
BJD	Prasanta Kumar Jagadev	73,984	51.46	
AOP	Pradeep Kumar Sahoo	30,559	21.26	
INC	Debasis Patnaik	20,689	14.39	
BJP	Jatin Kumar Mohanty	10,611	7.38	
NOTA	None of the above	767	0.53	
Majority		43,425	30.20	
Turnout		1,43,761	73.52	
Registered electors		1,93,920		
BJD gain from NCP				

=== 2009 ===
In 2009 election, Nationalist Congress Party candidate Prashanta Nanda defeated Indian National Congress candidate Pradeep Kumar Sahoo by a margin of 10,617 votes.

2009 Vidhan Sabha Election, Begunia
Party	Candidate	Votes	%	±%
NCP	Prashanta Nanda	45,355	38.73	−
INC	Pradeep Kumar Sahoo	34,738	29.66	−
Independent	Kailash Chandra Mahapatra	13,074	11.16	−
Independent	Prafulla Kumar Jati	12,171	10.39	−
BJP	Surendranath Mishra	6,692	5.71	−
Majority		10,617	9.07 (Note: %of total valid votes)	−
Turnout		1,17,113	61.98 (Note: 2004 Voter turnout was 65.51%)	▼3.53
Registered electors		1,88,949		
NCP gain from INC				
