= Sampad Chandra Swain =

Indian politician (born 1986)

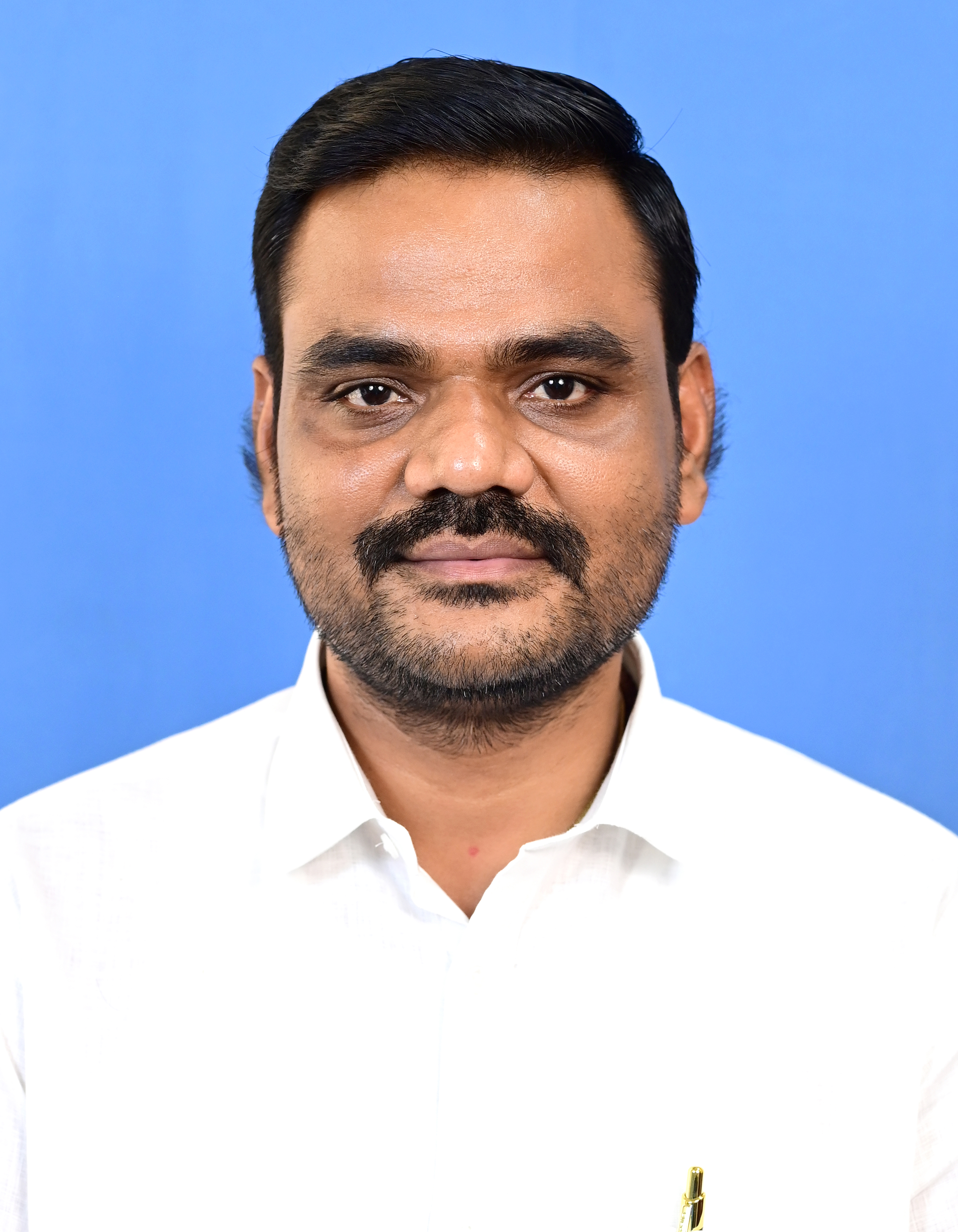
- Swain in 2024

Minister of State (Independent Charge) for Industries, Skill Development and Technical Education, Government of Odisha
- Incumbent
- Assumed office 12 June 2024
- Chief Minister: Mohan Charan Majhi

Member of the Odisha Legislative Assembly
- Incumbent
- Assumed office 4 June 2024
- Preceded by: Sambit Routray
- Constituency: Paradeep

Personal details
- Born: 20 January 1986 (age 40) Rangiagarh, Jagatsinghpur district, Odisha, India
- Party: Bharatiya Janata Party
- Spouse: Sushrita Sahu
- Parent: Nirmal Kumar Swain
- Education: Magnus School of Business (MBA)
- Profession: Politician, Farmer

Sampad Chandra Swain (born 20 January 1986) is an Indian politician and farmer from Odisha. He is a first-term Member of the Odisha Legislative Assembly representing the Paradeep Assembly constituency in the Jagatsinghpur district. Affiliated with the Bharatiya Janata Party (BJP), Swain currently serves as the Minister of State (Independent Charge) for Industries, Skill Development, and Technical Education in the Government of Odisha, having assumed office in June 2024 under the Mohan Charan Majhi ministry.

Swain was elected to the 17th Odisha Legislative Assembly after defeating Geetanjali Routray of the Biju Janata Dal by a margin of 15,787 votes in the 2024 Odisha Legislative Assembly election. Prior to his political career, he earned a Master of Business Administration (MBA) degree from the Magnus School of Business in 2009.

== Early life and education ==
Swain was born on 20 January 1986 to Nirmal Kumar Swain in the village of Rangiagarh, located in the Kujang tehasil of the Jagatsinghpur district in Odisha. Raised in an agrarian household, he maintains active ties to farming alongside his career in social work and politics. He is married to Sushrita Sahu.

Swain completed his undergraduate education with a Bachelor of Arts (BA) degree from Utkal University, Bhubaneswar, in 2007. He subsequently pursued higher studies in management, earning a Master of Business Administration (MBA) degree from the Magnus School of Business in 2009.

== Career ==
=== Early political career ===
Following the completion of his business management degree in 2009, Swain returned to his native Jagatsinghpur district. Before formally entering electoral politics, he engaged in agriculture and grassroots social work, gradually building his political base within the Bharatiya Janata Party (BJP) network in the coastal region.

Swain made his electoral debut in the 2019 Odisha Legislative Assembly election, contesting from the Paradeep Assembly constituency on a BJP ticket. He was unsuccessful in this attempt, finishing third behind the winning candidate, Sambit Routray of the Biju Janata Dal (BJD), and the runner-up, Arindam Sarkhel of the Indian National Congress.

=== 2024 election and ministerial appointment ===
Swain was renominated by the BJP for the Paradeep constituency in the 2024 Odisha Legislative Assembly election. Capitalizing on anti-incumbency and a strong party wave, he secured a decisive victory, polling 84,518 votes. He defeated his nearest rival, Geetanjali Routray of the BJD, by a margin of 15,787 votes to secure his first term as a Member of the Legislative Assembly (MLA).

Following the formation of the first BJP government in Odisha, Swain was inducted into the state cabinet. On 12 June 2024, he took the oath of office as a Minister of State (Independent Charge) along with Chief Minister Mohan Charan Majhi at Janata Maidan, Bhubaneswar. The oath was administered by Governor Raghubar Das in a ceremony attended by Prime Minister Narendra Modi, Union Home Minister Amit Shah, Defence Minister Rajnath Singh, and several chief ministers of BJP-ruled states. He was allocated the portfolios of Industries, Skill Development, and Technical Education.

=== Ministerial tenure (2024–present) ===
As Minister for Industries, Swain prioritized shifting Odisha's economy from a resource-dependent mining base to a diversified, knowledge-driven industrial landscape. In January 2025, his department hosted the Utkarsh Odisha—Make in Odisha Conclave 2025, supported by international roadshows in Singapore and domestic outreach in Delhi and Mumbai, aimed at attracting foreign direct investment in new-age sectors such as semiconductors, renewable energy, and green chemicals.

Under his tenure, the state government secured several high-profile industrial partnerships. This included an $11.5 billion joint venture between Adani Enterprises and the UAE-based IHC Group (IRH) for an integrated aluminium project, and a ₹67,000 crore agreement with ACME Group and Japan's IHI Corporation to establish major green ammonia facilities in Gopalpur and Paradip. He also launched the "MSME Vendor Connect Series" to integrate local micro, small, and medium enterprises into the supply chains of large anchor industries.

In his capacity as Minister for Skill Development and Technical Education, Swain expanded the state's "Skilled-in-Odisha" initiative. To modernize technical infrastructure, he oversaw the integration of specialized vocational training centers, including the inauguration of new Mechatronics and Geodetic Research Labs at the Bhubanananda Odisha School of Engineering (BOSE) in Cuttack in April 2025, developed through corporate social responsibility (CSR) collaborations with Festo India and Hexagon Geosystems. He additionally secured funding to establish a Centre of Excellence (CoE) tailored to the mining and critical minerals logistics sector.
