= Khurda Assembly constituency =

Constituency of the Odisha legislative assembly in India

Coordinates: 20.19°N 85.62°E

Khurda
- Constituency No. 117 for the Odisha Legislative Assembly
- Khurda Assembly constituency in Khordha district

Constituency details
- Country: India
- Region: East India
- State: Odisha
- Division: Central Division
- District: Khordha
- Lok Sabha constituency: Bhubaneswar
- Established: 1951
- Total electors: 2,50,080 (Note: as on 2024) (Note: as data published by election commission)
- Reservation: None

Member of Legislative Assembly
- 17th Odisha Legislative Assembly
- Incumbent Prasanta Kumar Jagadev
- Party: Bharatiya Janata Party
- Elected year: 2024

Khurda (Sl. No.: 117) is a Vidhan Sabha constituency of Khordha district, Odisha, India.

This constituency includes Khordha Municipality, Tangi N.A.C, Tangi block and 14 Gram panchayats (Palatotapada, Bajapur, Nijigarhtapanga, Kanpur, Dhaulimuhan, Brajamohanpur, Naranagarh, Godipada, Jankia, Golabaisasan, Orabarasingh, Kuradhamalla, Bangida and Kaipadar) of Khurda block.

== Elected members ==
Vote share of winning candidates
2024	46.08%
2019	48.88%
2014	45.62%
2009	28.85%
2004	49.70%
2000	34.84%
1998 (bypoll)	52.42%
1995	45.60%
1990	65.37%
1985 (bypoll)	50.38%
1985	67.62%
1980	48.76%
1977	35.50%

Since its formation in 1951, 19 elections were have been held, including 2 bypolls in 1985 and 1998.

List of members elected from Khurda constituency are:

Year	Member	Party
2024	Prasanta Kumar Jagadev	Bharatiya Janata Party
2019	Jyotirindra Nath Mitra	Biju Janata Dal
2014	Rajendra Kumar Sahoo	Biju Janata Dal
2009	Rajendra Kumar Sahoo	Independent politician
2004	Jyotirindra Nath Mitra	Biju Janata Dal
2000	Jyotirindra Nath Mitra	Independent politician
1998 (bypoll) (Note: Resignation of Prasanna Kumar Patasani on his election to Lok Sabha)	Dillip Srichandan	Indian National Congress
1995	Prasanna Kumar Patasani	Janata Dal
1990	Prasanna Kumar Patasani	Janata Dal
1985 (bypoll) (Note: Resignation of Janaki Ballabh Patnaik)	Prasanna Kumar Patasani	Independent politician
1985	Janaki Ballabh Patnaik	Indian National Congress
1980	Prasanna Kumar Patasani	Indian National Congress (I)
1977	Sudarsan Mohanty	Janata Party
1974	Benudhar Baliarsingh	Indian National Congress
1971	Benudhar Baliarsingh	Orissa Jana Congress
1967	Raja Birkishore Dev	Orissa Jana Congress
1961	Banamali Patnaik	Orissa Jana Congress
1957	Prananath Pattnaik	Communist Party of India
1951	Madhab Chandra Rautray	Indian National Congress

== Election results ==
=== 2024 ===
Voting were held on 25th May 2024 in 3rd phase of Odisha Assembly Election & 6th phase of Indian General Election. Counting of votes was on 4th June 2024. In 2024 election, Bharatiya Janata Party candidate Prasanta Kumar Jagadev defeated Biju Janata Dal candidate Rajendra Kumar Sahoo by a margin of 8,598 votes.

2024 Odisha Vidhan Sabha Election, Khurda
Party	Candidate	Votes	%	±%
BJP	Prasanta Kumar Jagadev	80,564	44.30	
BJD	Rajendra Kumar Sahoo	71,966	39.57	
Independent	Kalu Charan Khandeitaray	19,284	10.6	
INC	Sonali Sahoo	3,435	1.89	
NOTA	None of the above	1,233	0.68	
Majority		8,598	4.73	
Turnout		1,81,850	72.72	
BJP gain from BJD				

=== 2019 ===
In 2019 election, Biju Janata Dal candidate Jyotirindra Nath Mitra defeated Bharatiya Janata Party candidate Kalucharan Khandeitaray by a margin of 10,043 votes.

2019 Vidhan Sabha Election, Khurda
Party	Candidate	Votes	%	±%
BJD	Jyotirindra Nath Mitra	84,553	48.88	▲3.26
BJP	Kalucharan Khandeitaray	74,510	43.07	▲1.61
Independent	Jitendra Pradhan	6,467	3.74	−
INC	Swagatika Pattanaik	4,268	2.47	▼5.23
NOTA	None of the above	1,238	0.72	▲0.13
Majority		10,043	5.81	−
Turnout		1,72,991	71.41	−
BJD hold				

=== 2014 ===
In 2014 election, Biju Janata Dal candidate Rajendra Kumar Sahoo defeated Bhartiya Janata Party candidate Jyotirindra Nath Mitra by a margin of 6,592 votes.

2014 Vidhan Sabha Election, Khurda
Party	Candidate	Votes	%	±%
BJD	Rajendra Kumar Sahoo	72,297	45.62	−
BJP	Jyotirindra Nath Mitra	65,388	41.46	▲19.91
INC	Dillip Srichandan	12,202	7.70	▼2.18
NOTA	None of the above	932	0.59	−
Majority		6,597	4.16	
Turnout		1,58,478	74.16	12.98
Registered electors		2,13,691		
BJD gain from Independent				

=== 2009 ===
In 2009 election, Independent candidate Rajendra Kumar Sahoo defeated Independent candidate Jyotirindra Nath Mitra by a margin of 3,235 votes.

2009 Vidhan Sabha Election, Khurda
Party	Candidate	Votes	%	±%
Independent	Rajendra Kumar Sahoo	36,407	28.85	−
Independent	Jyotirindra Nath Mitra	33,172	26.29	−
BJP	Dillip Srichandan	27,197	21.55	−
INC	Sk. Abdul Bari	12,474	9.88	−
CPI(M)	Sivaji Patnaik	11,181	8.86	−
Majority		3,235	2.56 (Note: % of total valid votes)	−
Turnout		1,26,208	61.18 (Note: 2004 Voter turnout was 65.51%)	▼3.53
Registered electors		2,06,289		
Independent gain from BJD				
