= Sambit Routray =

Indian politician (born 1973)

- ସମ୍ବିତ ରାଉତରାୟ

Member of the Odisha Legislative Assembly
- In office 25 May 2019 – 3 June 2024
- Preceded by: Damodar Rout
- Succeeded by: Sampad Chandra Swain
- Constituency: Paradeep

Personal details
- Born: 21 March 1973 (age 53) Odisha, India
- Party: Biju Janata Dal
- Spouse: Geetanjali Routray
- Parent(s): Damodar Rout (father); Snehalata Rout (mother)
- Relatives: Pritinanda Routray (sister)
- Education: Siddaganga Institute of Technology (BE)
- Profession: Politician, Businessman

Sambit Routray (born 21 March 1973) is an Indian politician and businessman from Odisha. Affiliated with the Biju Janata Dal (BJD), he served as a Member of the 16th Odisha Legislative Assembly, representing the Paradeep Assembly constituency in the Jagatsinghpur district from 2019 to 2024.

The son of veteran Odisha politician and seven-time legislator Damodar Rout, Routray entered active electoral politics during the 2019 Odisha Legislative Assembly election. He successfully contested the Paradeep constituency—a seat previously held by his father—and defeated his closest rival, Arindam Sarkhel of the Indian National Congress, by a margin of 20,992 votes. Prior to his political career, he earned a Bachelor of Engineering (BE) degree in Mechanical Engineering from the Siddaganga Institute of Technology in Tumkur, graduating in 1996. During the 2024 Odisha Legislative Assembly election, the BJD ticket for the Paradeep constituency was allocated to his wife, Geetanjali Routray, who subsequently lost the seat to Sampad Chandra Swain of the Bharatiya Janata Party.

== See also ==
- 2019 Odisha Legislative Assembly election
- Odisha Legislative Assembly
