= Bhubaneswar Central Assembly constituency =

Constituency of the Odisha legislative assembly in India

Coordinates: 20.291°N 85.831°E

Bhubaneswar Central (Madhya)
- Constituency No. 112 for the Odisha Legislative Assembly
- Bhubaneswar Central Assembly constituency in Khordha district

Constituency details
- Country: India
- Region: East India
- State: Odisha
- Division: Central Division
- District: Khordha
- Lok Sabha constituency: Bhubaneswar
- Established: 2009
- Total electors: 2,19,233 (Note: as on 2024) (Note: as data published by election commission)
- Reservation: None

Member of Legislative Assembly
- 17th Odisha Legislative Assembly
- Incumbent Ananta Narayan Jena
- Party: Biju Janata Dal
- Elected year: 2024

Bhubaneswar Central (Madhya) is a Vidhan Sabha constituency of Khordha district, Odisha, India.

This constituency includes Ward No. 16 to 29 and 35 to 41 of BMC.

The constituency was formed in 2008 Delimitation and went for polls in 2009 election.

== Elected members ==
Vote share of winning candidates
2024	47.68%
2019	53.40%
2014	53.71%
2009	60.89%

Since its formation in 2009, 4 elections were held till date.

List of members elected from Bhubaneswar Central constituency are:

Year	Portrait	Member	Party
2024		Ananta Narayan Jena	Biju Janata Dal
2019		Ananta Narayan Jena	Biju Janata Dal
2014		Bijaya Kumar Mohanty	Biju Janata Dal
2009		Bijaya Kumar Mohanty	Biju Janata Dal
Till 2009 : See Bhubaneswar

== Election results ==
=== 2024 ===
Voting were held on 25 May 2024 in 3rd phase of Odisha Assembly Election & 6th phase of Indian General Election. Counting of votes was on 4 June 2024. In 2024 election, Biju Janata Dal candidate Ananta Narayan Jena defeated Bharatiya Janata Party candidate Jagannath Pradhan by a margin of 37 votes.

2024 Odisha Vidhan Sabha Election, Bhubaneswar Central
Party	Candidate	Votes	%	±%
BJD	Ananta Narayan Jena	53,759	47.68	▼5.72
BJP	Jagannath Pradhan	53,722	47.65	▲5.56
INC	Prakash Chandra Jena	3,308	2.93	▲0.22
NOTA	None of the above	689	0.61	▼0.12
Majority		37	0.03	
Turnout		1,12,754	51.43	
BJD hold				

=== 2019 ===
In 2019 election, Biju Janata Dal candidate Ananta Narayan Jena defeated Bharatiya Janata Party candidate Jagannath Pradhan by a margin of 11,442 votes.

2019 Odisha Legislative Assembly election: Bhubaneshwar Central (Madhya)
Party	Candidate	Votes	%	±%
BJD	Ananta Narayan Jena	54,022	53.40	▼0.31
BJP	Jagannath Pradhan	42,580	42.09	▲12.38
INC	Rajib Patnaik	2,746	2.71	▼9.54
NOTA	None of the above	740	0.73	
Majority		11,442	11.31	
Turnout		1,03,432	43.33	
BJD hold				

=== 2014 ===
In 2014 election, Biju Janata Dal candidate Bijaya Kumar Mohanty defeated Bharatiya Janata Party candidate Jagannath Pradhan by a margin of 22,389 votes.

2014 Vidhan Sabha Election, Bhubaneswar Central (Madhya)
Party	Candidate	Votes	%	±%
BJD	Bijaya Kumar Mohanty	50,107	53.71	▼7.18
BJP	Jagannath Pradhan	27,718	29.71	▲14.71
INC	Shuvendu Mohanty	11,429	12.25	▲2.84
NOTA	None of the above	1,009	0.08	
Majority		22,389	24	
Turnout		93,285	41.96%	
Registered electors		2,22,337		
BJD hold				

=== 2009 ===
In 2009 election, Biju Janata Dal candidate Bijaya Kumar Mohanty defeated Bharatiya Janata Party candidate Biswabhusan Harichandan by a margin of 34,985 votes.

2009 Vidhan Sabha Election, Bhubaneswar Central (Madhya)
Party	Candidate	Votes	%	±%
BJD	Bijaya Kumar Mohanty	46,417	60.89	−
BJP	Biswabhusan Harichandan	11,432	15.00	−
Independent	Jagannath Pradhan	8,159	10.70	−
INC	Alok Jena	7,176	9.41	−
Majority		34,985	45.89 (Note: % of total valid votes)	−
Turnout		76,284	33.78	
Registered electors		2,25,828		
BJD win (new seat)				
