= Nityananda Sahoo =

Indian politician

Member of Odisha Legislative Assembly
- In office 2014–2024
- Preceded by: Raghunath Mohanty
- Succeeded by: Subasini Jena
- Constituency: Basta

Personal details
- Political party: Biju Janata Dal
- Profession: Politician

Nityananda Sahoo is an Indian politician from Odisha. He was a two time elected Member of the Odisha Legislative Assembly from 2014 and 2019, representing Basta Assembly constituency as a Member of the Biju Janata Dal.

== See also ==
- 2014 Odisha Legislative Assembly election
- Odisha Legislative Assembly
