= Hinjili Assembly constituency =

Constituency of the Odisha legislative assembly in India

Coordinates: 19.48°N 84.74°E

Hinjili
- Constituency No. 131 for the Odisha Legislative Assembly
- Hinjili Assembly constituency in Ganjam district

Constituency details
- Country: India
- Region: East India
- State: Odisha
- Division: Southern Division
- District: Ganjam
- Lok Sabha constituency: Aska
- Established: 1952
- Total electors: 2,32,439 (Note: as on 2024) (Note: as data published by election commission)
- Reservation: None

Member of Legislative Assembly
- 17th Odisha Legislative Assembly
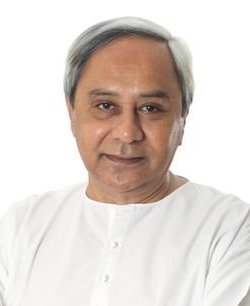
- Incumbent Naveen Patnaik; Leader of the Opposition in Odisha Legislative Assembly
- Party: Biju Janata Dal
- Elected year: 2024

Hinjili is a Legislative Assembly constituency in Ganjam district, Odisha.

Area of this constituency includes Hinjilicut, Hinjilicut block and Sheragada block.

It is the constituency of former Chief Minister of Odisha, Naveen Patnaik since 2000.

== Elected members ==
Vote share of winning candidates
2024	46.85%
2019	66.32%
2014	73.14%
2009	76.04%
2004	72.72%
2000	65.35%
1995	51.40%
1990	48.22%
1985	65.18%
1980	60.24%
1977	57.12%

Since its formation in 1951, 17 elections were held till date.

List of members elected from Hinjili constituency are:

Year	Name	Party
As Pattapur constituency
1952	Govind Pradhan	Communist Party of India
As Hinjili constituency
1957	Brundaban Nayak	Indian National Congress
1961	Brundaban Nayak	Indian National Congress
1967	Brundaban Nayak	Indian National Congress
1971	Brundaban Nayak	Utkal Congress
1974	Brundaban Nayak	Utkal Congress
1977	Brundaban Nayak	Indian National Congress
1980	Brundaban Nayak	Janata Party (Secular)
1985	Udayanath Nayak	Indian National Congress
1990	Harihar Sahu	Janata Dal
1995	Udayanath Nayak	Indian National Congress
2000	Naveen Patnaik	Biju Janata Dal
2004	Naveen Patnaik	Biju Janata Dal
2009	Naveen Patnaik	Biju Janata Dal
2014	Naveen Patnaik	Biju Janata Dal
2019	Naveen Patnaik	Biju Janata Dal
2024	Naveen Patnaik	Biju Janata Dal

== Election results ==
=== 2024 ===
Voting were held on 20 May 2024 in 2nd phase of Odisha Assembly Election & 5th phase of Indian General Election. Counting of votes was on 4 June 2024. In 2024 election, Biju Janata Dal candidate Naveen Patnaik defeated Bharatiya Janata Party candidate Sisir Kumar Mishra by a margin of 4,636 votes.

2024 Odisha Legislative Assembly election: Hinjili
Party	Candidate	Votes	%	±%
BJD	Naveen Patnaik	66,459	46.85	▼19.45
BJP	Sisir Kumar Mishra	61,823	43.59	▲19.68
INC	Ranjikant Padhi	5,380	3.79	▼1.43
NOTA	None of the above	1,921	1.35	▲0.29
Majority		4,636	3.26	▼39.35
Turnout		1,41,844	61.02	▼3.29
BJD hold				

=== 2019 ===
In 2019 election, Biju Janata Dal candidate Naveen Patnaik defeated Bharatiya Janata Party candidate Pitambar Acharya by a margin of 60,160 votes.

2019 Odisha Legislative Assembly election: Hinjili
Party	Candidate	Votes	%	±%
BJD	Naveen Patnaik	94,065	66.32	▼6.82
BJP	Pitambar Acharya	33,905	23.91	▲13.85
INC	Sambhu Panigrahi	7,265	5.12	▼5.27
NOTA	None of the above	1,503	1.06	▼0.49
Majority		60,160	42.61	▼20.14
Turnout		1,41,832	64.31	▲3.44
BJD hold				

=== 2014 ===
In 2014 election, Biju Janata Dal candidate Naveen Patnaik defeated Indian National Congress candidate Sibaram Patra by 76,586 votes.

2014 Odisha Legislative Assembly election: Hinjili
Party	Candidate	Votes	%	±%
BJD	Naveen Patnaik	89,267	73.14	▼2.90
INC	Sibaram Patra	12,681	10.39	▼1.78
BJP	Devananda Mahapatra	12,283	10.06	▲2.36
NOTA	None of the above	1,895	1.55	−
Majority		76,586	62.75	▼1.13
Turnout		1,22,044	60.87	▲10.48
Registered electors		2,00,469		
BJD hold				

=== 2009 ===
In 2009 election, Biju Janata Dal candidate Naveen Patnaik defeated Indian National Congress candidate Raghab Parida by 61,273 votes.

2009 Orissa Legislative Assembly election: Hinjili
Party	Candidate	Votes	%	±%
BJD	Naveen Patnaik	72,942	76.04	▲3.34
INC	Raghaba Parida	11,669	12.17	▼11.33
BJP	Debananda Mahapatra	7,389	7.70	−
Majority		61,273	63.88	▲15.28
Turnout		95,938	50.39	▼0.61
BJD hold				
