= Rajendra Kumar Sahoo =

Indian politician

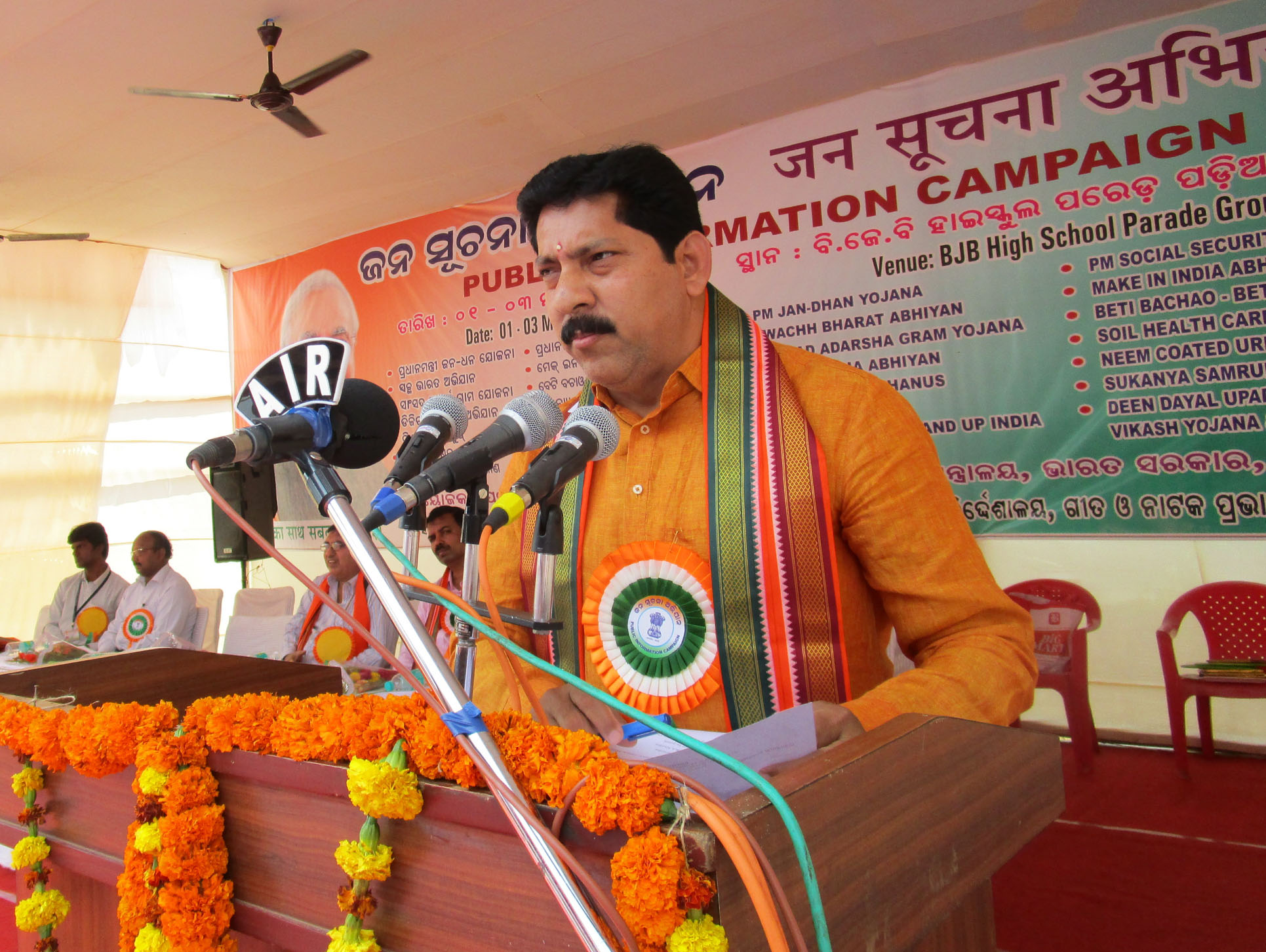
- Rajendra Kumar Sahoo addressing the gathering at the inaugural function of the Public Information Campaign, in Khordha, Odisha on March 01, 2016

Member of Odisha Legislative Assembly
- In office 2009–2019
- Preceded by: Jyotirindra Nath Mitra
- Constituency: Khurda
- In office 2019–2024
- Constituency: Begunia

Personal details
- Party: Biju Janata Dal
- Profession: Politician

Rajendra Kumar Sahoo is an Indian politician from Odisha. He has been elected to the Odisha Legislative Assembly three times. Initially elected in 2009 as an independent candidate, he later won from the Khurda Assembly constituency in 2014 and the Begunia Assembly constituency in 2019, representing the Biju Janata Dal.

== See also ==
- 2009 Odisha Legislative Assembly election
- Odisha Legislative Assembly
