= Ananta Narayan Jena =

Indian politician

Member of Odisha Legislative Assembly
- Incumbent
- Assumed office 4 June 2024
- Preceded by: Ananta Narayan Jena
- Constituency: Bhubaneswar

Personal details
- Party: Biju Janata Dal
- Profession: Politician

Ananta Narayan Jena is an Indian politician who was elected to the Odisha Legislative Assembly from Bhubaneswar as a member of the Biju Janata Dal.
