= 2009 Orissa Legislative Assembly election =

Assembly elections in Odisha, India

- 16 & 23 April 2009

All 147 Assembly Constituencies 74 seats needed for a majority
- Registered: 2,71,94,864 (▲6.02%)
- Turnout: 65.30% (▼0.75pp)
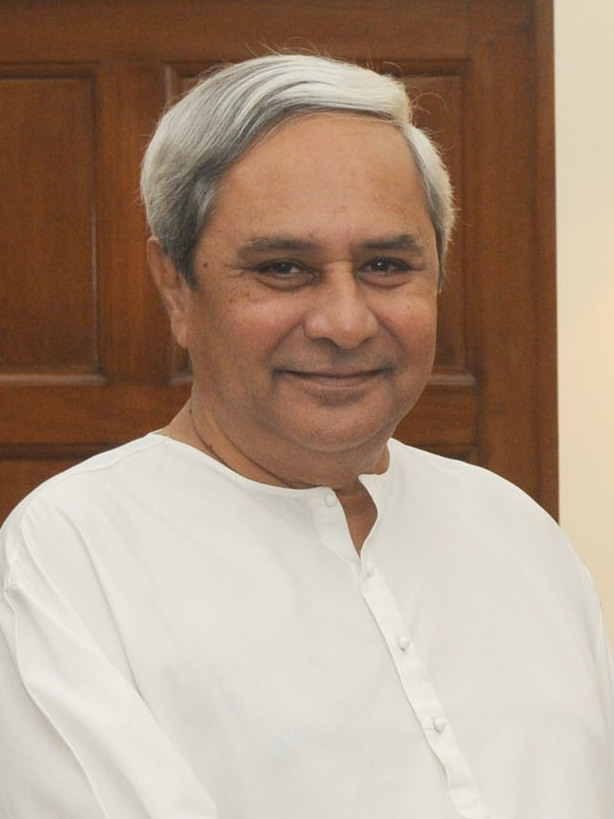

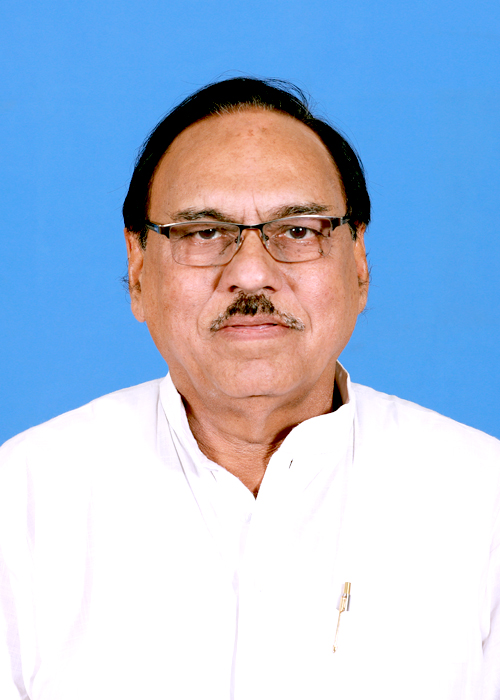

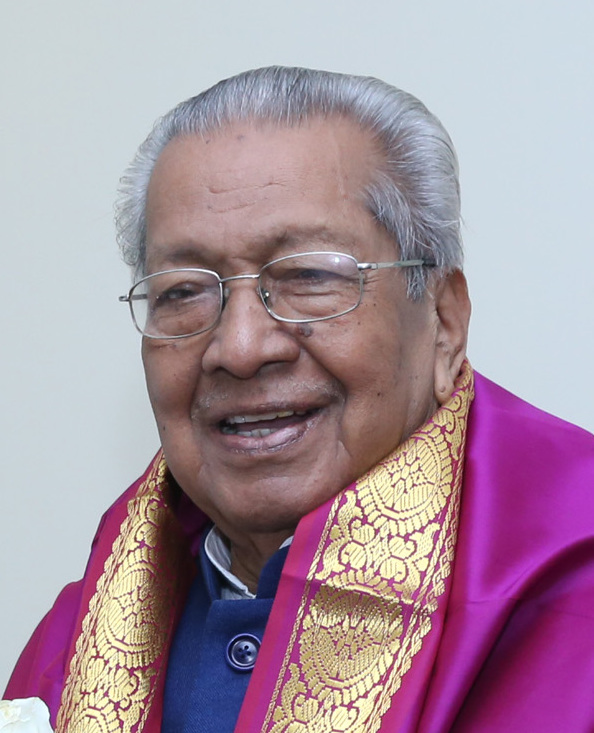
	Majority party	Minority party	Third party
Leader	Naveen Patnaik	Bhupendra Singh	Biswabhusan Harichandan
Party	BJD	INC	BJP
Alliance	Third Front (India)	UPA	NDA
Leader since	1996
Leader's seat	Hinjili	Narla (won)	Bhubaneswar Central (lost)
Last election	2004	2004	2004
Seats before	61	38	32
Seats won	103	27	6
Seat change	▲42	▼11	▼26
Popular vote	6,903,641	5,169,559	2,674,067
Percentage	38.86%	29.10%	15.05%
Swing	▲11.50%	▼5.72%	▼1.61%
- Seatwise Result Map of the election

- Structure of the Odisha Legislative Assembly after the election
Chief Minister before election
Naveen Patnaik
BJD
Elected Chief Minister
Naveen Patnaik
BJD

The 2009 Orissa Legislative Assembly election took place in April 2009, concurrently with the general election. The elections were held in the state in two phases. The results were declared on 16 May. Despite having recently separated from the Bharatiya Janata Party after an eleven-year partnership, the Biju Janata Dal (BJD) retained power in the Orissa State Assembly with a more convincing majority. Party chief Naveen Patnaik was formally re-elected as the BJD Legislature party leader on 19 May, thus paving the way for his third consecutive term as the Chief Minister of Orissa.

== Previous Assembly ==
In the 2004 Orissa Assembly election, the National Democratic Alliance (NDA) had swept the state with the BJD winning 61 seats and the Bharatiya Janata Party (BJP) winning 32 seats, giving the alliance comfortable majority in the 147-member house. This was the second consecutive term for the BJD-BJP combine after they first formed the government in 2000. The Naveen Patnaik government had been sworn in at the Bhubaneswar Raj Bhavan by Orissa Governor M. M. Rajendran in May 2004.

== Background ==
With the tenure of the Orissa Assembly scheduled to expire on 29 June 2009, the Election Commission of India announced on 2 March that year that the elections to the Assembly would be held alongside the general election. The election in each Assembly constituency (AC) was held in the same phase as the election to the corresponding Parliamentary constituency that the AC fell under.

Seat-sharing discussions got underway between allies, after eleven years of partnership and nearly two full terms as the Orissa state government, the BJD snapped ties with the BJP in March 2009, blaming the latter for the 2008 violence against Christians. Thereafter, the BJP withdrew support to Government and Governor Murlidhar Chandrakant Bhandare asked Chief Minister Naveen Patnaik to prove his majority in the Orissa Assembly. Naveen Patnaik then won a controversial trust vote on 11 March 2009, after the opposition Congress and BJP legislators walked out of the Assembly in protest in the manner the vote was being conducted.

The BJD then declared that they support neither Congress nor BJP. Though they decided to contest the 2009 elections in partnership with the Left Front and Nationalist Congress Party, the BJD did not officially join the Third Front.

== Schedule of election ==
Poll Event	Phase 1	Phase 2
Announcement & Issue of Press Note	Monday, 02 Mar 2009	
Issue of Notification	Monday, 23 Mar 2009	Saturday, 28 Mar 2009
Last Date for filing Nominations	Monday, 30 Mar 2009	Saturday, 04 Apr 2009
Scrutiny of Nominations	Tuesday, 31 Mar 2009	Monday, 06 Apr 2009
Last date for withdrawal of Candidature	Thursday, 02 Apr 2009	Wednesday, 08 Apr 2009
Date of Poll	Thursday, 16 Apr 2009	Thursday, 23 Apr 2009
Counting of Votes on	Saturday, 16 May 2009	
Date of election being completed	Thursday, 28 May 2009	
Constituencies Polling on this day	70	77
Source: Election Commission of India

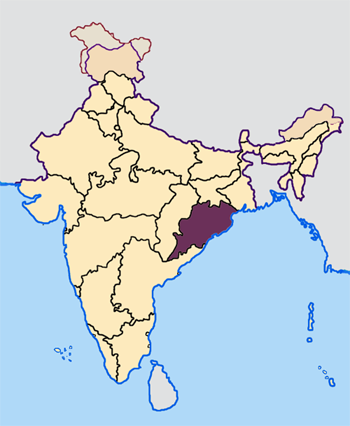
Location of Orissa in India

== Parties and alliances ==
=== Third Front ===
Party	Flag	Symbol	Leader	Seats contested
Biju Janata Dal			Naveen Patnaik	129
Nationalist Congress Party			P. A. Sangma	8
Communist Party of India				5
Communist Party of India (Marxist)			Prakash Karat	4

=== United Progressive Alliance ===
Party	Flag	Symbol	Leader	Seats contested
Indian National Congress			Bhupendra Singh	147

=== National Democratic Alliance ===
Party	Flag	Symbol	Leader	Seats contested
Bharatiya Janata Party			Biswabhusan Harichandan	145

== Number of candidates ==
Party Type	Code	Party name	Number of candidates	Total
National Parties	BJP	Bharatiya Janata Party	145	423
National Parties	BSP	Bahujan Samaj Party	114	423
National Parties	CPI	Communist Party of India	5	423
National Parties	CPM	Communist Party of India (Marxist)	4	423
National Parties	INC	Indian National Congress	147	423
National Parties	NCP	Nationalist Congress Party	8	423
State Parties	BJD	Biju Janata Dal	129	161
State Parties	JMM	Jharkhand Mukti Morcha	32	161
State Parties - Other States	AITC	All India Trinamool Congress	5	86
State Parties - Other States	JD(U)	Janata Dal (United)	10	86
State Parties - Other States	LJP	Lok Jan Shakti Party	8	86
State Parties - Other States	RSP	Revolutionary Socialist Party	18	86
State Parties - Other States	SP	Samajwadi Party	45	86
Unrecognised or Unregistered Parties	AJSU	All Jharkhand Students Union	4	247
Unrecognised or Unregistered Parties	BJSH	Bharatiya Jan Shakti	3	247
Unrecognised or Unregistered Parties	BOP	Bira Oriya Party	1	247
Unrecognised or Unregistered Parties	CPI(ML)(L)	Communist Party of India (Marxist-Leninist) Liberation	17	247
Unrecognised or Unregistered Parties	IJP	Indian Justice Party	5	247
Unrecognised or Unregistered Parties	JDP	Jharkhand Disom Party	6	247
Unrecognised or Unregistered Parties	JHKP	Jana Hitkari Party	7	247
Unrecognised or Unregistered Parties	JKP	Jharkhand Party	1	247
Unrecognised or Unregistered Parties	KOKD	Kosal Kranti Dal	18	247
Unrecognised or Unregistered Parties	KS	Kalinga Sena	36	247
Unrecognised or Unregistered Parties	LSP	Lok Satta Party	1	247
Unrecognised or Unregistered Parties	OCP	Orissa Communist Party	2	247
Unrecognised or Unregistered Parties	OMM	Orissa Mukti Morcha	8	247
Unrecognised or Unregistered Parties	RPD	Rashtriya Parivartan Dal	16	247
Unrecognised or Unregistered Parties	RPI	Republican Party of India	5	247
Unrecognised or Unregistered Parties	RPI(A)	Republican Party of India (Athavale)	13	247
Unrecognised or Unregistered Parties	RWS	Rashtrawadi Sena	4	247
Unrecognised or Unregistered Parties	SAMO	Samurdha Odisha	99	247
Unrecognised or Unregistered Parties	SWJP	Samajwadi Jan Parishad	1	247
Independents	n/a	Independents	371	371
Total:				1288
Source: Election Commission of India

== List of Candidates from Major Parties ==
Constituency		BJD+		INC		BJP	
#	Name	Party	Candidate	Party	Candidate	Party	Candidate
1	Padampur	BJD	Bijaya Ranjan Singh Bariha	INC	Satya Bhusan Sahu	BJP	Pradip Purohit
2	Bijepur	BJD	Prabhat Aditya Mishra	INC	Subal Sahu	BJP	Mohammad Rafique
3	Bargarh	BJD	Ananda Acharya	INC	Sadhu Nepak	BJP	Sureswar Satpathy
4	Attabira (SC)	BJD	Snehangini Chhuria	INC	Nihar Ranjan Mahananda	BJP	Bipin Bhusagar
5	Bhatli	BJD	Susanta Singh	INC	Prakash Chandra Debta	BJP	Bimbadhar Kuanr
6	Brajarajnagar	CPI	Ramasahaya Panda	INC	Anup Kumar Sai	BJP	Suresh Pujari
7	Jharsuguda	BJD	Kishore Kumar Mohanty	INC	Naba Kishore Das	BJP	Dinesh Kumar Jain
8	Talsara (ST)	NCP	Purna Chandra Minj	INC	Dr. Prafulla Majhi	BJP	Sahadev Xaxa
9	Sundargarh (ST)	BJD	Sunil Kumar Singh Deo	INC	Jogesh Kumar Singh	BJP	Premsagar Oram
10	Biramitrapur (ST)	BJD	Sanjeeb Pratap Singhdeo	INC	Serophina Toppo	BJP	Raisan Tirkey
11	Raghunathpali (SC)	BJD	Subrat Tarai	INC	Prafulla Kumar Sunyani	BJP	Santosh Kumar Behera
12	Rourkela	BJD	Sarada Prasad Nayak	INC	Prasanta Kumar Behera	BJP	Ramesh Kumar Agrawal
13	Rajgangapur (ST)	BJD	Benedict Tirkey	INC	Gregory Minz	BJP	Mahendra Kumar Majhi
14	Bonai (ST)	CPM	Laxman Munda	INC	Ranajit Kishan	BJP	Bhimsen Choudhury
15	Kuchinda (ST)	BJD	Brundaban Majhi	INC	Rajendra Kumar Chhatria	BJP	Rabinarayan Naik
16	Rengali (SC)	BJD	Sanatan Bisi	INC	Duryodhan Gardia	BJP	Debananda Bhusagar
17	Sambalpur	NCP	Siddharth Das	INC	Sureswar Mishra	BJP	Jayanarayan Mishra
18	Rairakhol	BJD	Prasanna Acharya	INC	Assaf Ali Khan	BJP	Sarat Chandra Sahu
19	Deogarh	BJD	Sanjeeb Kumar Pradhan	INC	Nitesh Ganga Deb	BJP	Subash Chandra Panigrahi
20	Telkoi (ST)	BJD	Premananda Nayak	INC	Brundaban Naik	BJP	Manas Kumar Naik
21	Ghasipura	BJD	Badrinarayan Patra	INC	Niranjan Patnaik	BJP	Santosh Kumar Rout
22	Anandapur (SC)	BJD	Bhagirathi Sethy	INC	Jayadev Jena	BJP	Arati Singh
23	Patna (ST)	BJD	Hrusikesh Naik	INC	Sanatan Naik	BJP	Goura Hari Naik
24	Keonjhar (ST)	BJD	Subarna Naik	INC	Bidyadhara Dehury	BJP	Mohan Charan Majhi
25	Champua	CPI	Bidyadhar Mahanta	INC	Sanatan Mahakud	BJP	Murali Manohar Sharma
26	Jashipur (ST)	BJD	Kamala Kanta Nayak	INC	Mahendra Nath Nayak	BJP	Sudhir Naik
27	Saraskana (ST)	NCP	Rama Chandra Hansdah	INC	Sanatan Munda	BJP	Majhiaram Tudu
28	Rairangpur (ST)	NCP	Kashinath Hembram	INC	Shyam Charan Hansdah	BJP	Jaduram Murmu
29	Bangriposi (ST)	BJD	Sarojini Hembram	INC	Gouri Naik	BJP	Setanath Kisku
30	Karanjia (ST)	BJD	Bijay Kumar Naik	INC	Jabamani Tudu	BJP	Sumantra Naik
31	Udala (ST)	BJD	Shrinath Soren	INC	Ananga Charan Senapati	BJP	Bijay Kumar Senapati
32	Badasahi (SC)	BJD	Manoranjan Sethi	INC	Ganeswar Patra	Did not field	
33	Baripada (ST)	BJD	Sananda Marandi	INC	Kanhu Soren	BJP	Golak Bihari Naik
34	Morada	BJD	Praveen Chandra Bhanjdeo	INC	Jnanendra Nath Das	BJP	Rajkisore Das
35	Jaleswar	CPM	Sisir Kumar Hui	INC	Debi Prasanna Chand	BJP	Aswini Kumar Patra
36	Bhograi	BJD	Ananta Das	INC	Kartikeswar Patra	BJP	Ramakanta Behera
37	Basta	BJD	Raghunath Mohanty	INC	Jaynarayan Mohanty	BJP	Arabinda Behera
38	Balasore	BJD	Jiban Pradip Dash	INC	Subhankar Mohapatra	BJP	Sanjay Kumar Patra
39	Remuna (SC)	BJD	Sudarshan Jena	INC	Tarun Kumar Das	BJP	Giridhari Das
40	Nilgiri	CPM	Pradipta Panda	INC	Diptikanta Mahapatra	Did not field	
41	Soro (SC)	CPI	Jayakrushna Mallik	INC	Surendra Prasad Pramanik	BJP	Parshuram Dhada
42	Simulia	BJD	Parsuram Panigrahi	INC	Padmalochan Panda	BJP	Tanuja Panda
43	Bhandaripokhari	BJD	Prafulla Samal	INC	Badri Narayan Dhal	BJP	Manmohan Samal
44	Bhadrak	BJD	Jugal Kishore Pattnaik	INC	Naren Pallai	BJP	Tusar Kanti Jena
45	Basudevpur	BJD	Bijayshree Routray	INC	Madhabananda Mallick	BJP	Ashok Kumar Sahu
46	Dhamnagar (SC)	BJD	Rajendra Kumar Das	INC	Netrananda Mallick	BJP	Bishnu Charan Sethi
47	Chandabali	BJD	Bijaya Nayak	INC	Amiya Kumar Mahapatra	BJP	Purna Chandra Pani
48	Binjharpur (SC)	BJD	Pramila Mallik	INC	Babita Mallick	BJP	Manas Ranjan Mallick
49	Bari	BJD	Debasis Nayak	INC	Naba Kishore Samal	BJP	Jagannath Prasad Samal
50	Barchana	NCP	Amar Prasad Satpathy	INC	Sitakanta Mohapatra	BJP	Pabitra Mohan Samantaray
51	Dharmasala	BJD	Kalpataru Das	INC	Kangali Charan Panda	BJP	Ramesh Chandra Parida
52	Jajpur	BJD	Pranab Prakash Das	INC	Debabrata Kantha	BJP	Goutam Ray
53	Korei	BJD	Pritiranjan Gharai	INC	Hemalata Khuntia	BJP	Sanchita Mohanty
54	Sukinda	BJD	Prafulla Chandra Ghadai	INC	Sarat Raut	BJP	Dola Gobinda Mohanta
55	Dhenkanal	NCP	Nabin Nanda	INC	Sudhir Kumar Samal	BJP	Krushna Chandra Patra
56	Hindol (SC)	BJD	Anjali Behera	INC	Rebati Behera	BJP	Laxmidhar Behera
57	Kamakhyanagar	BJD	Prafulla Kumar Mallik	INC	Satrughan Jena	BJP	Premananda Jena
58	Parjanga	BJD	Dr. Nrusingha Sahu	INC	Laxmidhar Sahoo	BJP	Bibuti Bhusan Pradhan
59	Pallahara	BJD	Rabi Narayan Pani	INC	Bibhudhendra Pratap Das	BJP	Dharmendra Pradhan
60	Talcher	BJD	Mahesh Sahoo	INC	Khirod Sahu	BJP	Kalandi Samal
61	Angul	BJD	Rajani Kant Singh	INC	Sangram Keshari Mishra	BJP	Minaketan Amanta
62	Chhendipada (SC)	BJD	Khageswar Behera	INC	Agasti Behera	BJP	Sanjaya Kumar Naik
63	Athamallik	BJD	Sanjeeb Kumar Sahoo	INC	Mousumi Pradhan	BJP	Bhagirathi Pradhan
64	Birmaharajpur (SC)	BJD	Padmanabh Behera	INC	Binod Patra	BJP	Damayanti Barik
65	Sonepur	BJD	Niranjan Pujari	INC	Jitendra Patnaik	BJP	Naba Krushna Danta
66	Loisingha (SC)	BJD	Ramakanta Seth	INC	Pandava Chandra Kumbhar	BJP	Magha Kumbhar
67	Patnagarh	BJD	Prakriti Devi Singh Deo	INC	Bibeka Nanda Meher	BJP	Kanak Vardhan Singh Deo
68	Bolangir	BJD	Anang Uday Singh Deo	INC	Laxman Kumar Meher	BJP	Dr. Basudev Pati
69	Titlagarh	BJD	Jogendra Behera	INC	Surendra Singh Bhoi	BJP	Santanu Kumar Naik
70	Kantabanji	BJD	Haji Mahammad Ayub Khan	INC	Santosh Singh Saluja	BJP	Ajay Kumar Das
71	Nuapada	BJD	Rajendra Dholakia	INC	Saroj Kumar Sahu	BJP	Basanta Kumar Panda
72	Khariar	BJD	Duryodhan Majhi	INC	Baishampayan Meher	BJP	Hitesh Kumar Bagartti
73	Umarkote (ST)	BJD	Jagabandhu Majhi	INC	Parama Pujari	BJP	Dharmu Gond
74	Jharigam (ST)	BJD	Ramesh Chandra Majhi	INC	Jalandhar Majhi	BJP	Sona Majhi
75	Nabarangpur (ST)	BJD	Manohar Randhari	INC	Sadan Nayak	BJP	Manjula Majhi
76	Dabugam (ST)	BJD	Motiram Nayak	INC	Bhujabal Majhi	BJP	Mohan Majhi
77	Lanjigarh (ST)	BJD	Balabhadra Majhi	INC	Shibaji Majhi	BJP	Bijaya Dishari
78	Junagarh	BJD	Bira Sipka	INC	Gobardhan Dash	BJP	Himansu Sekher Meher
79	Dharmgarh	BJD	Puspendra Singh Deo	INC	Rahasbihari Behera	BJP	Janardan Panda
80	Bhawanipatna (SC)	BJD	Jayanta Kumar Naik	INC	Dusmanta Naik	BJP	Pradipta Kumar Naik
81	Narla	NCP	Zakir Hussain	INC	Bhupinder Singh	BJP	Srikant Hota
82	Baliguda (ST)	BJD	Dinesh Singh Pradhan	INC	Sadananda Mallick	BJP	Karendra Majhi
83	G. Udayagiri (ST)	BJD	Luko Sunamajhi	INC	Ajayanti Pradhan	BJP	Manoj Kumar Pradhan
84	Phulbani (ST)	BJD	Debendra Kanhar	INC	Jalandhar Kanhar	BJP	Debanarayan Pradhan
85	Kantamal	BJD	Bhagban Kanhor	INC	Kanhai Charan Danga	BJP	Hari Narayan Pradhan
86	Boudh	BJD	Pradip Kumar Amat	INC	Narendra Kumar Panigrahi	BJP	Santanu Kumar Pradhan
87	Baramba	BJD	Debiprasad Mishra	INC	Surendra Kumar Nanda	BJP	Saroj Kumar Rana
88	Banki	BJD	Pravata Kumar Tripathy	INC	Debasis Patnaik	BJP	Subhransu Mohan Padhi
89	Athagarh			INC	Subas Mohanty	BJP	Rama Narayan Mohanty
90	Barabati-Cuttack	BJD	Debashish Samantaray	INC	Suresh Mohapatra	BJP	Samir Dey
91	Choudwar-Cuttack	BJD	Pravat Ranjan Biswal	INC	Sabitri Chowdhury	BJP	Nayan Kishore Mohanty
92	Niali (SC)	BJD	Pramod Kumar Mallick	INC	Artatrana Malik	BJP	Sushanta Kumar Mallick
93	Cuttack Sadar (SC)	BJD	Kalindi Behera	INC	Ashima Mahananda	BJP	Dilip Kumar Mallick
94	Salipur	BJD	Chandra Sarathi Behera	INC	Prakash Chandra Behera	BJP	Om Prakash Ray
95	Mahanga	BJD	Pratap Jena	INC	Sk. Matlub Ali	BJP	Ch. Pravatkeshari Mishra
96	Patkura	BJD	Bed Prakash Agrawalla	INC	Narayan Prasad Swain	BJP	Bijoy Mohapatra
97	Kendrapara (SC)	BJD	Sipra Mallick	INC	Ganeswar Behera	BJP	Bijay Kumar Mallick
98	Aul	BJD	Pratap Keshari Deb	INC	Devendra Sharma	BJP	Braja Sundar Bhuyan
99	Rajanagar	BJD	Alekh Kumar Jena	INC	Nalini Kanta Mohanty	BJP	Bijaya Ketan Swain
100	Mahakalapada	BJD	Atanu Sabyasachi Nayak	INC	Balaram Parida	BJP	Gandharb Chandra Nayak
101	Paradeep	BJD	Damodara Rout	INC	Pramod Kishore Jena	BJP	Sankhanada Behera
102	Tirtol (SC)	BJD	Rabindra Nath Bhoi	INC	Rajkishore Behera	BJP	Latamani Das
103	Balikuda-Ersama	BJD	Prasanta Kumar Muduli	INC	Umesh Chandra Swain	BJP	Priya Ranjan Das
104	Jagatsinghpur	BJD	Bishnu Charan Das	INC	Chiranjib Biswal	BJP	Upendra Nath Biswal
105	Kakatpur (SC)	BJD	Rabi Mallick	INC	Biswa Bhusan Das	BJP	Iswar Chandra Behera
106	Nimapara	BJD	Samir Ranjan Dash	INC	Satyabrata Patra	BJP	Sankarsan Parida
107	Puri	BJD	Maheswar Mohanty	INC	Uttam Kumar Acharya	BJP	Uma Ballav Rath
108	Bramhagiri	BJD	Sanjay Kumar Das Burma	INC	Lalatendu Mohapatra	BJP	Amrut Kumar Jena
109	Satyabadi	BJD	Umakanta Samantaray	INC	Prasad Kumar Harichandan	BJP	Krushna Chandra Jagadev
110	Pipili	BJD	Pradeep Maharathy	INC	Judhistir Samantaray	BJP	Ajit Mangaraj
111	Jayadev (SC)	BJD	Arabinda Dhali	INC	Nalini Behera	BJP	Hrusi Kesha Nayak
112	Bhubaneswar Central	BJD	Bijaya Kumar Mohanty	INC	Alok Jena	BJP	Biswabhusan Harichandan
113	Bhubaneswar North	BJD	Bhagirathi Badajena	INC	Kishore Kumar Jena	BJP	Golak Prasad Mahapatra
114	Ekamra-Bhubaneswar	BJD	Ashok Chandra Panda	INC	Pratap Kumar Jena	BJP	Samir Mohanty
115	Jatani	BJD	Bibhuti Bhusan Balabantaray	INC	Suresh Kumar Routaray	BJP	Sudipta Ray
116	Begunia	NCP	Prashanta Nanda	INC	Pradip Kumar Sahoo	BJP	Surendranath Mishra
117	Khurda	CPM	Sivaji Patnaik	INC	Sk. Abdul Bari	BJP	Dr. Dillip Srichandan
118	Chilika	BJD	Raghunath Sahu	INC	Manas Ranjan Mangaraj	BJP	Bibhuti Bhusan Harichandan
119	Ranpur	BJD	Satyanarayan Pradhan	INC	Ramakanta Mishra	BJP	Surama Padhy
120	Khandapada	BJD	Siddharth Sekhar Singh	INC	Soumya Ranjan Patnaik	BJP	Bijayalaxmi Pattnaik
121	Daspalla (SC)	BJD	Kashinath Mallik	INC	Lecturer Bullion	BJP	Manoj Kumar Behera
122	Nayagarh	BJD	Arun Kumar Sahu	INC	Sandhya Mohapatra	BJP	Jugansu Sekhar Panda
123	Bhanjanagar	BJD	Bikram Keshari Arukha	INC	Debi Prasad Bishoyi	BJP	Sivanand Tripathy
124	Polasara	BJD	Niranjan Pradhan	INC	Ram Krushna Patnaik	BJP	Jayanti Padhiary
125	Kabisuryangar	BJD	V. Sugnana Kumari Deo	INC	Kishor Pallei	BJP	Prabodha Chand Panda
126	Khalikote (SC)	BJD	Purna Chandra Sethy	INC	Kasinath Behara	BJP	Mina Kumari Tahal
127	Chhatrapur (SC)	CPI	Adikanda Sethi	INC	Somanath Behera	BJP	Bhagaban Behera
128	Aska	BJD	Debaraj Mohanty	INC	Alekha Choudhury	BJP	Surya Narayan Das
129	Surada	BJD	Purna Chandra Swain	INC	Syed Mubarak	BJP	Barat Dandpani Patro
130	Sanakhemundi	CPI	N. Narayan Reddy	INC	Ramesh Chandra Jena	BJP	Kishore Chandra Singh Deo
131	Hinjili	BJD	Naveen Patnaik	INC	Raghabo Parida	BJP	Debananda Mahapatra
132	Gopalpur	BJD	Pradeep Kum. Panigrahy	INC	Trinath Behera	BJP	Bibhuti Bhusan Jena
133	Berhampur	BJD	Ramesh Chandra Patnaik	INC	Bikram Kumar Panda	BJP	Rama Chandra Panda
134	Digapahandi	BJD	Surya Narayana Patro	INC	V. Rabi Narayan Raju	BJP	Shreedhar Dev
135	Chikiti	BJD	Usha Devi	INC	Chintamani Dyan Samantara	BJP	Kanhu Charan Pati
136	Mohana (ST)	BJD	Johan Dalabehera	INC	Chakradhara Paik	BJP	Antarjami Gamanga
137	Paralakhemundi	BJD	K. Narayana Rao	INC	Trinath Sahu	BJP	T. Kuranna
138	Gunupur (ST)	BJD	Ramamurty Mutika	INC	Sisir Kumar Gamang	BJP	Aswini Gomango
139	Bissam Cuttack (ST)	BJD	Jagannath Saraka	INC	Damburudhara Ulaka	BJP	Bidulata Huika
140	Rayagada (ST)	BJD	Lal Bihari Himirika	INC	Ulaka Rama Chandra	BJP	Kaliram Majhi
141	Laxmipur (ST)	BJD	Jhina Hikaka	INC	Hema Gamang	BJP	Gopinath Kadatasia
142	Kotpad (ST)	BJD	Gopi Nath Nayak	INC	Basudev Majhi	BJP	Padmanav Majhi
143	Jeypore	BJD	Rabi Narayan Nanda	INC	K. Nagraj Dora	BJP	Tara Prasad Bahinipati
144	Koraput (SC)	BJD	Raghuram Padal	INC	Krishna Chandra Sagaria	BJP	Jayaram Garada
145	Pottangi (ST)	BJD	Prafulla Kumar Pangi	INC	Rama Chandra Kadam	BJP	Dhanpati Eading
146	Malkangiri (ST)	BJD	Mukunda Sodi	INC	Nabin Chandra Madkami	BJP	Aditya Madhi
147	Chitrakonda (ST)	BJD	Dambaru Sisa	INC	Mamta Madhi	BJP	Sukra Muduli

== Results ==
Source: Election Commission of India
Party			Popular vote			Seats		
Flag	Name	Symbol	Votes	%	±pp	Contested	Won	+/−
	Biju Janata Dal		6,903,641	38.86	▲11.5	129	103	▲42
	Indian National Congress		5,169,559	29.10	▼5.72	147	27	▼11
	Bharatiya Janata Party		2,674,067	15.05	▼2.06	145	6	▼26
	Nationalist Congress Party		237,528	1,34	(new)	8	4	(new)
	Communist Party of India		89,852	0.51	▼0.14	5	1	Steady
-	Independents	-	1,537,859	8.66	▼3.54	372	6	▼2
Total			-	100	-	-	147	-
Valid Votes			17,765,071	65.33				
Invalid Votes			8,118	-				
Total Votes polled / turnout			17,773,189	65.35				
Abstentation			9,421,675	-				
Total No. of Electors			27,194,864					

=== District wise results ===
District	Seats						
District	Seats	BJD	INC	BJP	NCP	CPI	IND
Angul	5	4	—N/a	—N/a	—N/a	—N/a	1
Balangir	5	2	2	1	—N/a	—N/a	—N/a
Balasore	8	5	2	—N/a	—N/a	—N/a	1
Bargarh	5	2	3	—N/a	—N/a	—N/a	—N/a
Bhadrak	5	5	—N/a	—N/a	—N/a	—N/a	—N/a
Boudh	2	2	—N/a	—N/a	—N/a	—N/a	—N/a
Cuttack	9	8	—N/a	—N/a	—N/a	—N/a	1
Deogarh	1	1	—N/a	—N/a	—N/a	—N/a	—N/a
Dhenkanal	4	3	—N/a	—N/a	1	—N/a	—N/a
Gajapati	2	1	1	—N/a	—N/a	—N/a	—N/a
Ganjam	13	11	1	—N/a	—N/a	1	—N/a
Jagatsinghpur	4	4	—N/a	—N/a	—N/a	—N/a	—N/a
Jajpur	7	6	—N/a	—N/a	1	—N/a	—N/a
Jharsuguda	2	—N/a	2	—N/a	—N/a	—N/a	—N/a
Kalahandi	5	1	4	—N/a	—N/a	—N/a	—N/a
Kandhamal	3	1	—N/a	2	—N/a	—N/a	—N/a
Kendrapara	5	5	—N/a	—N/a	—N/a	—N/a	—N/a
Keonjhar	6	5	—N/a	—N/a	—N/a	—N/a	1
Khurda	8	6	—N/a	—N/a	1	—N/a	1
Koraput	5	3	2	—N/a	—N/a	—N/a	—N/a
Malkangiri	2	1	1	—N/a	—N/a	—N/a	—N/a
Mayurbhanj	9	7	1	—N/a	1	—N/a	—N/a
Nabarangpur	4	3	1	—N/a	—N/a	—N/a	—N/a
Nayagarh	4	4	—N/a	—N/a	—N/a	—N/a	—N/a
Nuapada	2	1	—N/a	1	—N/a	—N/a	—N/a
Puri	6	5	1	—N/a	—N/a	—N/a	—N/a
Rayagada	3	2	1	—N/a	—N/a	—N/a	—N/a
Sambalpur	4	1	2	1	—N/a	—N/a	—N/a
Subarnapur	2	2	—N/a	—N/a	—N/a	—N/a	—N/a
Sundargarh	7	2	3	1	—N/a	—N/a	1
Total	147	103	27	6	4	1	6

=== Region wise results ===
Region	Seats						
Region	Seats	BJD	INC	BJP	NCP	CPI	IND
Northern Odisha	41	22	12	3	1	—N/a	3
Central Odisha	65	55	4	—N/a	3	—N/a	3
Southern Odisha	41	26	11	3	—N/a	1	—N/a
State Total	147	103	27	6	4	1	6

== Elected members ==
Constituency			Winner				Runner Up				Margin	%
#	Name	Poll %	Candidate	Party	Votes	%	Candidate	Party	Votes	%	Margin	%
1	Padampur	75.50%	Bijaya Ranjan Singh Bariha	BJD	67,913	44.15	Satya Bhusan Sahu	INC	49,847	32.41	18,066	11.74
2	Bijepur	70.23%	Subal Sahu	INC	56,864	40.91	Prabhat Aditya Mishra	BJD	47,893	34.45	8,971	6.46
3	Bargarh	64.38%	Sadhu Nepak	INC	46,762	40.38	Ananda Acharya	BJD	44,793	38.68	1,969	1.70
4	Attabira (SC)	65.87%	Nihar Ranjan Mahananda	INC	49,396	39.65	Snehangini Chhuria	BJD	36,067	28.95	13,329	10.70
5	Bhatli	74.10%	Susanta Singh	BJD	60,502	42.58	Prakash Chandra Debta	INC	55,731	39.22	4,771	3.36
6	Brajarajnagar	63.61%	Anup Kumar Sai	INC	50,585	43.46	Suresh Pujari	BJP	48,843	41.96	1,742	1.50
7	Jharsuguda	72.71%	Naba Kishore Das	INC	62,663	49.28	Kishore Kumar Mohanty	BJD	40,147	31.58	22,516	17.70
8	Talsara (ST)	65.00%	Dr. Prafulla Majhi	INC	44,082	39.85	Sahadev Xaxa	BJP	24,341	22.00	19,741	17.85
9	Sundargarh (ST)	65.33%	Jogesh Kumar Singh	INC	55,183	43.92	Sunil Kumar Singh Deo	BJD	34,253	27.26	20,930	16.66
10	Biramitrapur (ST)	68.72%	George Tirkey	IND	45,132	36.38	Nihar Surin	JMM	24,321	19.60	20,811	16.78
11	Raghunathpali (SC)	51.40%	Subrat Tarai	BJD	35,023	45.19	Prafulla Kumar Sunyani	INC	16,852	21.74	18,171	23.45
12	Rourkela	47.76%	Sarada Prasad Nayak	BJD	46,020	53.25	Ramesh Kumar Agrawal	BJP	20,424	23.63	25,596	29.62
13	Rajgangapur (ST)	60.80%	Gregory Minz	INC	35,592	30.91	Benedict Tirkey	BJD	31,477	27.34	4,115	3.57
14	Bonai (ST)	68.87%	Bhimsen Choudhury	BJP	30,495	23.97	Laxman Munda	CPM	27,139	21.33	3,356	2.64
15	Kuchinda (ST)	67.41%	Rajendra Kumar Chhatria	INC	49,112	39.01	Rabinarayan Naik	BJP	36,400	28.91	12,712	10.10
16	Rengali (SC)	63.47%	Duryodhan Gardia	INC	32,656	31.45	M.B.Pyariraj	IND	18,872	18.17	13,784	13.28
17	Sambalpur	45.40%	Jayanarayan Mishra	BJP	34,110	43.52	Sureswar Mishra	INC	27,100	34.58	7,010	8.94
18	Rairakhol	63.74%	Prasanna Acharya	BJD	37,718	35.07	Assaf Ali Khan	INC	27,954	25.99	9,764	9.08
19	Deogarh	71.04%	Sanjeeb Kumar Pradhan	BJD	54,266	38.99	Nitesh Ganga Deb	INC	43,561	31.30	10,705	7.69
20	Telkoi (ST)	69.85%	Premananda Nayak	BJD	53,279	40.73	Brundaban Naik	INC	35,801	27.37	17,478	13.36
21	Ghasipura	78.04%	Badrinarayan Patra	BJD	77,890	52.85	Niranjan Patnaik	INC	52,336	35.51	25,554	17.34
22	Anandapur (SC)	72.94%	Bhagirathi Sethy	BJD	72,765	52.94	Jayadev Jena	INC	48,960	35.62	23,805	17.32
23	Patna (ST)	71.81%	Hrusikesh Naik	BJD	53,408	42.47	Sanatan Naik	INC	28,784	22.89	24,624	19.58
24	Keonjhar (ST)	64.80%	Subarna Naik	BJD	36,471	30.34	Mohan Charan Majhi	BJP	29,202	24.29	7,269	6.05
25	Champua	66.54%	Jitu Patnaik	IND	27,700	22.10	Sanatan Mahakud	INC	27,555	21.98	145	0.12
26	Jashipur (ST)	69.33%	Kamala Kanta Nayak	BJD	35,569	29.97	Sambhunath Naik	IND	22,379	18.86	13,190	11.11
27	Saraskana (ST)	69.81%	Rama Chandra Hansdah	NCP	39,832	35.75	Ram Chandra Murmu	JMM	25,242	22.65	14,590	13.10
28	Rairangpur (ST)	62.76%	Shyam Charan Hansdah	INC	24,792	21.53	Purna Chandra Marndi	JMM	20,190	17.53	4,602	4.00
29	Bangriposi (ST)	76.66%	Sarojini Hembram	BJD	43,771	36.13	Sudam Marndi	JMM	37,440	30.91	6,331	5.22
30	Karanjia (ST)	68.81%	Bijay Kumar Naik	BJD	38,934	37.31	Jabamani Tudu	INC	17,533	16.80	21,401	20.51
31	Udala (ST)	70.25%	Shrinath Soren	BJD	40,597	35.53	Ananga Charan Senapati	INC	29,404	25.74	11,193	9.79
32	Badasahi (SC)	71.25%	Manoranjan Sethi	BJD	48,382	45.27	Ganeswar Patra	INC	32,883	30.77	15,499	14.50
33	Baripada (ST)	68.22%	Sananda Marandi	BJD	33,840	29.66	Bhadav Hansdah	JMM	29,080	25.49	4,760	4.17
34	Morada	75.99%	Praveen Chandra Bhanjdeo	BJD	37,609	28.87	Bimal Lochan Das	JMM	31,408	24.11	6,201	4.76
35	Jaleswar	70.99%	Debi Prasanna Chand	INC	59,685	40.95	Aswini Kumar Patra	BJP	53,381	36.63	6,304	4.32
36	Bhograi	72.20%	Ananta Das	BJD	73,474	53.34	Kartikeswar Patra	INC	55,824	40.53	17,650	12.81
37	Basta	77.18%	Raghunath Mohanty	BJD	74,472	50.68	Jaynarayan Mohanty	INC	64,942	44.20	9,530	6.48
38	Balasore	65.24%	Jiban Pradip Dash	BJD	55,710	45.42	Anup Kumar Das	IND	42,220	34.42	13,490	11.00
39	Remuna (SC)	66.80%	Sudarshan Jena	BJD	55,847	47.52	Gobinda Chandra Das	IND	25,124	21.38	30,723	26.14
40	Nilgiri	68.65%	Pratap Chandra Sarangi	IND	35,525	30.63	Pradipta Panda	CPM	32,469	28.00	3,056	2.63
41	Soro (SC)	63.80%	Surendra Prasad Pramanik	INC	50,159	43.19	Parshuram Dhada	BJP	49,799	42.88	360	0.31
42	Simulia	67.55%	Parsuram Panigrahi	BJD	63,479	47.87	Padmalochan Panda	INC	52,552	39.63	10,927	8.24
43	Bhandaripokhari	73.11%	Prafulla Samal	BJD	60,250	44.37	Badri Narayan Dhal	INC	39,840	29.34	20,410	15.03
44	Bhadrak	65.12%	Jugal Kishore Pattnaik	BJD	75,294	53.99	Naren Pallai	INC	53,866	38.63	21,428	15.36
45	Basudevpur	70.04%	Bijayshree Routray	BJD	70,856	48.49	Madhabananda Mallick	INC	64,016	43.81	6,840	4.68
46	Dhamnagar (SC)	66.08%	Rajendra Kumar Das	BJD	48,424	38.78	Bishnu Charan Sethi	BJP	43,480	34.82	4,944	3.96
47	Chandabali	68.28%	Bijaya Nayak	BJD	58,467	43.57	Amiya Kumar Mahapatra	INC	50,854	37.89	7,613	5.68
48	Binjharpur (SC)	60.49%	Pramila Mallik	BJD	66,507	61.05	Babita Mallick	INC	34,646	31.80	31,861	29.25
49	Bari	58.84%	Debasis Nayak	BJD	55,842	51.23	Naba Kishore Samal	INC	44,075	40.43	11,767	10.80
50	Barchana	66.79%	Amar Prasad Satpathy	NCP	43,473	40.38	Sitakanta Mohapatra	INC	32,824	30.49	10,649	9.89
51	Dharmasala	74.08%	Kalpataru Das	BJD	79,867	58.25	Kangali Charan Panda	INC	44,734	32.63	35,133	25.62
52	Jajpur	63.82%	Pranab Prakash Das	BJD	61,712	50.05	Debabrata Kantha	INC	31,467	25.52	30,245	24.53
53	Korei	66.94%	Pritiranjan Gharai	BJD	61,448	56.98	Hemalata Khuntia	INC	36,336	33.69	25,112	23.29
54	Sukinda	76.43%	Prafulla Chandra Ghadai	BJD	58,765	47.71	Sarat Raut	INC	56,362	45.76	2,403	1.95
55	Dhenkanal	64.57%	Nabin Nanda	NCP	51,118	35.28	Sudhir Kumar Samal	INC	44,185	30.50	6,933	4.78
56	Hindol (SC)	62.64%	Anjali Behera	BJD	60,291	44.83	Rebati Behera	INC	45,252	33.65	15,039	11.18
57	Kamakhyanagar	64.99%	Prafulla Kumar Mallik	BJD	53,766	45.11	Satrughan Jena	INC	33,172	27.83	20,594	17.28
58	Parjanga	69.07%	Dr. Nrusingha Sahu	BJD	48,131	38.73	Bibuti Bhusan Pradhan	BJP	42,943	34.56	5,188	4.17
59	Pallahara	73.93%	Rabi Narayan Pani	BJD	40,980	37.96	Dharmendra Pradhan	BJP	35,513	32.90	5,467	5.06
60	Talcher	67.77%	Braja Kishore Pradhan	IND	37,048	36.21	Mahesh Sahoo	BJD	28,406	27.77	8,642	8.44
61	Angul	67.03%	Rajani Kant Singh	BJD	61,381	49.70	Sangram Keshari Mishra	INC	40,918	33.13	20,463	16.57
62	Chhendipada (SC)	69.43%	Khageswar Behera	BJD	54,388	45.37	Agasti Behera	INC	49,482	41.27	4,906	4.10
63	Athamallik	72.65%	Sanjeeb Kumar Sahoo	BJD	61,388	48.86	Mousumi Pradhan	INC	42,407	33.75	18,981	15.11
64	Birmaharajpur (SC)	72.51%	Padmanabh Behera	BJD	61,803	48.67	Binod Patra	INC	40,402	31.82	21,401	16.85
65	Sonepur	72.86%	Niranjan Pujari	BJD	68,844	43.12	Naba Krushna Danta	BJP	40,537	25.39	28,307	17.73
66	Loisingha (SC)	72.07%	Ramakanta Seth	BJD	49,659	34.40	Pandava Chandra Kumbhar	INC	45,566	31.56	4,093	2.84
67	Patnagarh	67.39%	Kanak Vardhan Singh Deo	BJP	63,996	40.31	Prakriti Devi Singh Deo	BJD	44,614	28.10	19,382	12.21
68	Bolangir	64.47%	Anang Uday Singh Deo	BJD	52,948	40.70	Laxman Kumar Meher	INC	36,082	27.74	16,866	12.96
69	Titlagarh	73.12%	Surendra Singh Bhoi	INC	57,753	39.16	Jogendra Behera	BJD	52,915	35.88	4,838	3.28
70	Kantabanji	68.91%	Santosh Singh Saluja	INC	62,495	43.24	Haji Mahammad Ayub Khan	BJD	57,191	39.57	5,304	3.67
71	Nuapada	69.25%	Rajendra Dholakia	BJD	56,874	41.62	Basanta Kumar Panda	BJP	34,254	25.07	22,620	16.55
72	Khariar	67.27%	Hitesh Kumar Bagartti	BJP	53,238	37.07	Duryodhan Majhi	BJD	41,872	29.15	11,366	7.92
73	Umarkote (ST)	70.17%	Jagabandhu Majhi	BJD	44,326	40.60	Dharmu Gond	BJP	30,155	27.62	14,171	12.98
74	Jharigam (ST)	69.44%	Ramesh Chandra Majhi	BJD	54,767	45.72	Jalandhar Majhi	INC	32,491	27.12	22,276	18.60
75	Nabarangpur (ST)	69.79%	Manohar Randhari	BJD	51,448	36.41	Sadan Nayak	INC	48,114	34.05	3,334	2.36
76	Dabugam (ST)	72.31%	Bhujabal Majhi	INC	44,723	37.30	Motiram Nayak	BJD	37,349	31.15	7,374	6.15
77	Lanjigarh (ST)	68.70%	Shibaji Majhi	INC	46,138	34.47	Balabhadra Majhi	BJD	43,099	32.20	3,039	2.27
78	Junagarh	69.76%	Gobardhan Dash	INC	45,349	31.48	Bira Sipka	BJD	38,812	26.94	6,537	4.54
79	Dharmgarh	71.65%	Puspendra Singh Deo	BJD	56,470	35.83	Rahasbihari Behera	INC	33,564	21.30	22,906	14.53
80	Bhawanipatna (SC)	64.30%	Dusmanta Naik	INC	46,215	36.47	Pradipta Kumar Naik	BJP	44,020	34.73	2,195	1.74
81	Narla	71.09%	Bhupinder Singh	INC	49,748	36.32	Srikant Hota	BJP	22,236	16.23	27,512	20.09
82	Baliguda (ST)	66.57%	Karendra Majhi	BJP	26,180	33.11	Sadananda Mallick	INC	22,943	29.02	3,237	4.09
83	G. Udayagiri (ST)	65.42%	Manoj Kumar Pradhan	BJP	45,009	43.92	Ajayanti Pradhan	INC	21,074	20.56	23,935	23.36
84	Phulbani (ST)	65.22%	Debendra Kanhar	BJD	38,092	36.60	Debanarayan Pradhan	BJP	29,363	28.21	8,729	8.39
85	Kantamal	73.85%	Bhagban Kanhor	BJD	45,979	44.68	Kanhai Charan Danga	INC	31,526	30.64	14,453	14.04
86	Boudh	73.15%	Pradip Kumar Amat	BJD	49,439	50.60	Susanta Kumar Pradhan	IND	21,232	21.73	28,207	28.87
87	Baramba	65.32%	Debiprasanna Mishra	BJD	79,658	59.86	Surendra Kumar Nanda	INC	41,469	31.16	38,189	28.70
88	Banki	71.52%	Pravata Kumar Tripathy	BJD	70,731	54.79	Debasis Patnaik	INC	47,286	36.63	23,445	18.16
89	Athagarh	72.24%	Ramesh Rout	IND	68,881	54.70	Bichitra Nanda Muduli	IND	43,371	34.44	25,510	20.26
90	Barabati-Cuttack	50.54%	Debashish Samantaray	BJD	52,097	53.61	Suresh Mohapatra	INC	27,612	28.41	24,485	25.20
91	Choudwar-Cuttack	53.15%	Pravat Ranjan Biswal	BJD	58,495	56.53	Deepak Kumar Barik	IND	25,718	24.85	32,777	31.68
92	Niali (SC)	64.55%	Pramod Kumar Mallick	BJD	90,658	65.45	Artatrana Malik	INC	40,005	28.88	50,653	36.57
93	Cuttack Sadar (SC)	61.36%	Kalindi Behera	BJD	71,631	63.78	Ashima Mahananda	INC	22,287	19.84	49,344	43.94
94	Salipur	70.16%	Chandra Sarathi Behera	BJD	66,375	47.35	Prakash Chandra Behera	INC	65,098	46.44	1,277	0.91
95	Mahanga	70.86%	Pratap Jena	BJD	89,628	56.82	Sk. Matlub Ali	INC	60,408	38.30	29,220	18.52
96	Patkura	68.55%	Bed Prakash Agrawalla	BJD	71,725	49.12	Bijoy Mohapatra	BJP	44,990	30.81	26,735	18.31
97	Kendrapara (SC)	66.01%	Sipra Mallick	BJD	62,436	52.61	Ganeswar Behera	INC	46,505	39.19	15,931	13.42
98	Aul	63.10%	Pratap Keshari Deb	BJD	72,012	50.00	Devendra Sharma	INC	66,135	45.92	5,877	4.08
99	Rajanagar	68.68%	Alekh Kumar Jena	BJD	63,683	48.15	Nalini Kanta Mohanty	INC	59,348	44.87	4,335	3.28
100	Mahakalapada	72.92%	Atanu Sabyasachi Nayak	BJD	70,433	48.69	Balaram Parida	INC	50,838	35.14	19,595	13.55
101	Paradeep	67.61%	Damodara Rout	BJD	66,863	53.21	Ramesh Samantaray	IND	36,512	29.05	30,351	24.16
102	Tirtol (SC)	66.10%	Rabindra Nath Bhoi	BJD	82,282	58.73	Rajkishore Behera	INC	48,100	34.33	34,182	24.40
103	Balikuda-Ersama	68.69%	Prasanta Kumar Muduli	BJD	89,044	57.73	Umesh Chandra Swain	INC	57,659	37.38	31,385	20.35
104	Jagatsinghpur	69.93%	Bishnu Charan Das	BJD	67,299	50.64	Chiranjib Biswal	INC	57,222	43.06	10,077	7.58
105	Kakatpur (SC)	65.60%	Rabi Mallick	BJD	74,114	52.57	Biswa Bhusan Das	INC	58,893	41.77	15,221	10.80
106	Nimapara	70.71%	Samir Ranjan Dash	BJD	80,762	53.50	Satyabrata Patra	INC	41,608	27.56	39,154	25.94
107	Puri	57.67%	Maheswar Mohanty	BJD	61,328	51.58	Uma Ballav Rath	BJP	47,934	40.32	13,394	11.26
108	Brahmagiri	78.56%	Sanjay Kumar Das Burma	BJD	70,533	48.57	Lalatendu Bidyadhar Mohapatra	INC	65,647	45.20	4,886	3.37
109	Satyabadi	70.96%	Prasad Kumar Harichandan	INC	44,862	35.56	Umakanta Samantaray	BJD	36,582	29.00	8,280	6.56
110	Pipili	73.43%	Pradeep Maharathy	BJD	74,112	49.14	Judhistir Samantaray	INC	61,607	40.85	12,505	8.29
111	Jayadev (SC)	65.18%	Arabinda Dhali	BJD	59,888	57.47	Narendranath Nayak	IND	16,284	15.63	43,604	41.84
112	Bhubaneswar Central	33.76%	Bijaya Kumar Mohanty	BJD	46,417	60.89	Biswabhusan Harichandan	BJP	11,432	15.00	34,985	45.89
113	Bhubaneswar North	35.08%	Bhagirathi Badajena	BJD	62,778	72.05	Golak Prasad Mahapatra	BJP	11,316	12.99	51,462	59.06
114	Ekamra-Bhubaneswar	37.19%	Ashok Chandra Panda	BJD	55,095	65.63	Pratap Kumar Jena	INC	11,645	13.87	43,450	51.76
115	Jatani	60.50%	Bibhuti Bhusan Balabantaray	BJD	55,573	47.85	Suresh Kumar Routaray	INC	40,648	35.00	14,925	12.85
116	Begunia	61.98%	Prashanta Nanda	NCP	45,355	38.73	Pradip Kumar Sahoo	INC	34,738	29.66	10,617	9.07
117	Khurda	61.18%	Rajendra Ku. Sahoo	IND	36,407	28.85	Jyotirindra Nath Mitra	IND	33,172	26.29	3,235	2.56
118	Chilika	66.03%	Raghunath Sahu	BJD	57,216	45.59	Bibhuti Bhusan Harichandan	BJP	54,150	43.15	3,066	2.44
119	Ranpur	68.27%	Satyanarayan Pradhan	BJD	54,643	45.48	Surama Padhy	BJP	33,042	27.50	21,601	17.98
120	Khandapada	72.67%	Siddharth Sekhar Singh	BJD	61,654	54.71	Soumya Ranjan Patnaik	INC	44,840	39.79	16,814	14.92
121	Daspalla (SC)	64.48%	Kashinath Mallik	BJD	61,142	59.28	Lecturer Bullion	INC	22,384	21.70	38,758	37.58
122	Nayagarh	67.74%	Arun Kumar Sahu	BJD	67,100	54.25	Hemendra Chandra Singh	IND	39,759	32.15	27,341	22.10
123	Bhanjanagar	59.92%	Bikram Keshari Arukha	BJD	90,515	76.50	Debi Prasad Bishoyi	INC	17,148	14.49	73,367	62.01
124	Polasara	57.05%	Niranjan Pradhan	BJD	55,193	49.04	Ram Krushna Patnaik	INC	43,871	38.98	11,322	10.06
125	Kabisuryangar	54.55%	V. Sugnana Kumari Deo	BJD	56,960	56.01	Kishor Pallei	INC	33,892	33.33	23,068	22.68
126	Khalikote (SC)	53.46%	Purna Chandra Sethy	BJD	65,299	68.07	Kasinath Behara	INC	20,670	21.55	44,629	46.52
127	Chhatrapur (SC)	55.21%	Adikanda Sethi	CPI	46,244	44.26	Bhagaban Behera	BJP	29,687	28.42	16,557	15.84
128	Aska	52.62%	Debaraj Mohanty	BJD	46,059	52.25	Saroja Kumar Padhi	IND	16,073	18.23	29,986	34.02
129	Surada	57.70%	Purna Chandra Swain	BJD	43,299	40.41	Nilamani Bisoyi	IND	39,288	36.66	4,011	3.75
130	Sanakhemundi	55.88%	Ramesh Chandra Jena	INC	50,487	50.35	Kishore Chandra Singh Deo	BJP	26,894	26.82	23,593	23.53
131	Hinjili	50.38%	Naveen Patnaik	BJD	72,942	76.04	Raghabo Parida	INC	11,669	12.17	61,273	63.87
132	Gopalpur	55.51%	Dr. Kumar Panigrahy	BJD	37,612	42.77	Dr. Behera	INC	18,854	21.44	18,758	21.33
133	Berhampur	48.16%	Dr. Chandra Chyau Patnaik	BJD	38,407	46.68	Bikram Kumar Panda	INC	34,563	42.01	3,844	4.67
134	Digapahandi	62.82%	Surya Narayana Patro	BJD	65,219	61.75	V.Rabi Narayan Raju	INC	32,456	30.73	32,763	31.02
135	Chikiti	60.68%	Usha Devi	BJD	55,099	52.79	Chintamani Dyan Samantara	INC	40,870	39.16	14,229	13.63
136	Mohana (ST)	66.26%	Chakradhara Paik	INC	37,697	33.63	Antarjami Gamanga	BJP	36,780	32.82	917	0.81
137	Paralakhemundi	63.71%	K. Narayana Rao	BJD	58,528	51.10	Trinath Sahu	INC	43,587	38.06	14,941	13.04
138	Gunupur (ST)	60.41%	Ramamurty Mutika	BJD	41,687	38.62	Sisir Kumar Gamang	INC	22,938	21.25	18,749	17.37
139	Bissam Cuttack (ST)	71.39%	Damburudhara Ulaka	INC	47,555	34.50	Jagannath Saraka	BJD	47,206	34.24	349	0.26
140	Rayagada (ST)	60.75%	Lal Bihari Himirika	BJD	52,847	44.45	Ulaka Rama Chandra	INC	37,186	31.28	15,661	13.17
141	Laxmipur (ST)	53.52%	Jhina Hikaka	BJD	25,095	32.47	Hema Gamang	INC	21,689	28.06	3,406	4.41
142	Kotpad (ST)	73.31%	Basudev Majhi	INC	45,603	37.40	Gopi Nath Nayak	BJD	34,369	28.19	11,234	9.21
143	Jeypore	70.10%	Rabi Narayan Nanda	BJD	57,504	46.12	Tara Prasad Bahinipati	BJP	48,188	38.65	9,316	7.47
144	Koraput (SC)	58.74%	Raghuram Padal	BJD	33,235	34.97	Krishna Chandra Sagaria	INC	32,121	33.80	1,114	1.17
145	Pottangi (ST)	59.96%	Rama Chandra Kadam	INC	41,451	41.60	Prafulla Kumar Pangi	BJD	36,015	36.14	5,436	5.46
146	Malkangiri (ST)	50.27%	Mukunda Sodi	BJD	38,788	39.96	Nabin Chandra Madkami	INC	27,882	28.73	10,906	11.23
147	Chitrakonda (ST)	51.25%	Mamta Madhi	INC	22,822	27.86	Dambaru Sisa	BJD	22,562	27.55	260	0.31

== Government formation ==
Despite fighting against both BJP & Congress, the BJD emerged victorious with more than two-thirds majority in the 147 member Legislative Assembly. Naveen Patnaik was sworn in for his third consecutive term by Governor M.C. Bhandare on 2009-05-21 at the Bhubaneswar Raj Bhavan.

== See also ==
- State Assembly elections in India, 2009
- Indian general election in Orissa, 2009
- Legislative Assembly election results of Orissa
