= Prasanta Kumar Jagadev =

Indian politician

Member of Odisha Legislative Assembly
- Incumbent
- Assumed office 4 June 2024
- Preceded by: Jyotirindra Nath Mitra
- Constituency: Khurda

Personal details
- Party: Bharatiya Janata Party
- Profession: Politician

Prasanta Kumar Jagadev is an Indian politician. He was elected to the Odisha Legislative Assembly from Khurda as a member of the Bharatiya Janata Party.
