= 2024 Odisha Legislative Assembly election =

2024 legislative assembly election in Odisha, India

- 13 May – 1 June 2024

All 147 seats in the Odisha Legislative Assembly 74 seats needed for a majority
- Registered: 3,37,16,965 (▲4.54%)
- Turnout: 74.79% (▲1.87pp)
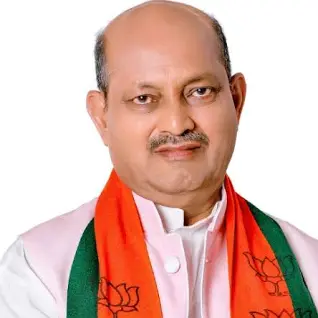

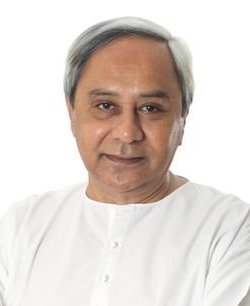

	Majority party	Minority party	Third party
Leader	Manmohan Samal (Note: The BJP did not project a chief ministerial candidate ahead of the election. Mohan Charan Majhi was elected leader of the BJP Legislature Party on 11 June and appointed Chief Minister on 12 June, following the declaration of the election results on 4 June.)	Naveen Patnaik	Sarat Pattanayak (Note: Pattanayak led the campaign as the president of the Odisha Pradesh Congress Committee but was defeated in his own constituency, finishing fourth behind the BJP, BJD, and an independent candidate.)
Party	BJP	BJD	INC
Leader since	24 March 2023	26 December 1997	23 May 2022
Leader's seat	Chandabali (Lost)	Hinjili (Won); Kantabanji (Lost)	Nuapada (Lost)
Seats before	23	112	9
Seats won	78	51	14
Seat change	▲55	▼61	▲5
Popular vote	10,064,827	10,102,454	3,331,319
Percentage	40.07%	40.22%	13.26%
Swing	▲7.58 pp	▼4.49 pp	▼2.86 pp

- Composition of the Odisha Legislative Assembly after the election
Chief Minister before election
Naveen Patnaik
BJD
Elected Chief Minister
Mohan Charan Majhi
BJP

2024 Odisha Legislative Assembly elections were held in the eastern coastal state of Odisha from 13 May to 1 June 2024 to elect the 147 members of the Odisha Legislative Assembly. The votes were counted and results were declared on 4 June 2024, leading to the formation of the 17th Assembly.

The Bharatiya Janata Party (BJP) won 78 seats, securing a simple majority in the assembly and ending the 24-year tenure of the Biju Janata Dal (BJD) government led by Naveen Patnaik. Following the election, the BJP extended its legislative footprint when all three independent MLAs extended their support to the party. Manmohan Samal, the BJP's state president who steered the party's election campaign in Odisha, was defeated in the Chandabali constituency.

On 12 June 2024, Mohan Charan Majhi, the MLA from Keonjhar, was sworn in as the 15th Chief Minister of Odisha. Kanak Vardhan Singh Deo and Pravati Parida were sworn in concurrently as deputy chief ministers.

== Background ==
The tenure of sixteenth Odisha Legislative Assembly was scheduled to end on 24 June 2024. The previous assembly elections were held in April 2019. After the elections, Biju Janata Dal (BJD) formed the state government, with the then incumbent Naveen Patnaik continuing as the Chief Minister.

== Schedule ==
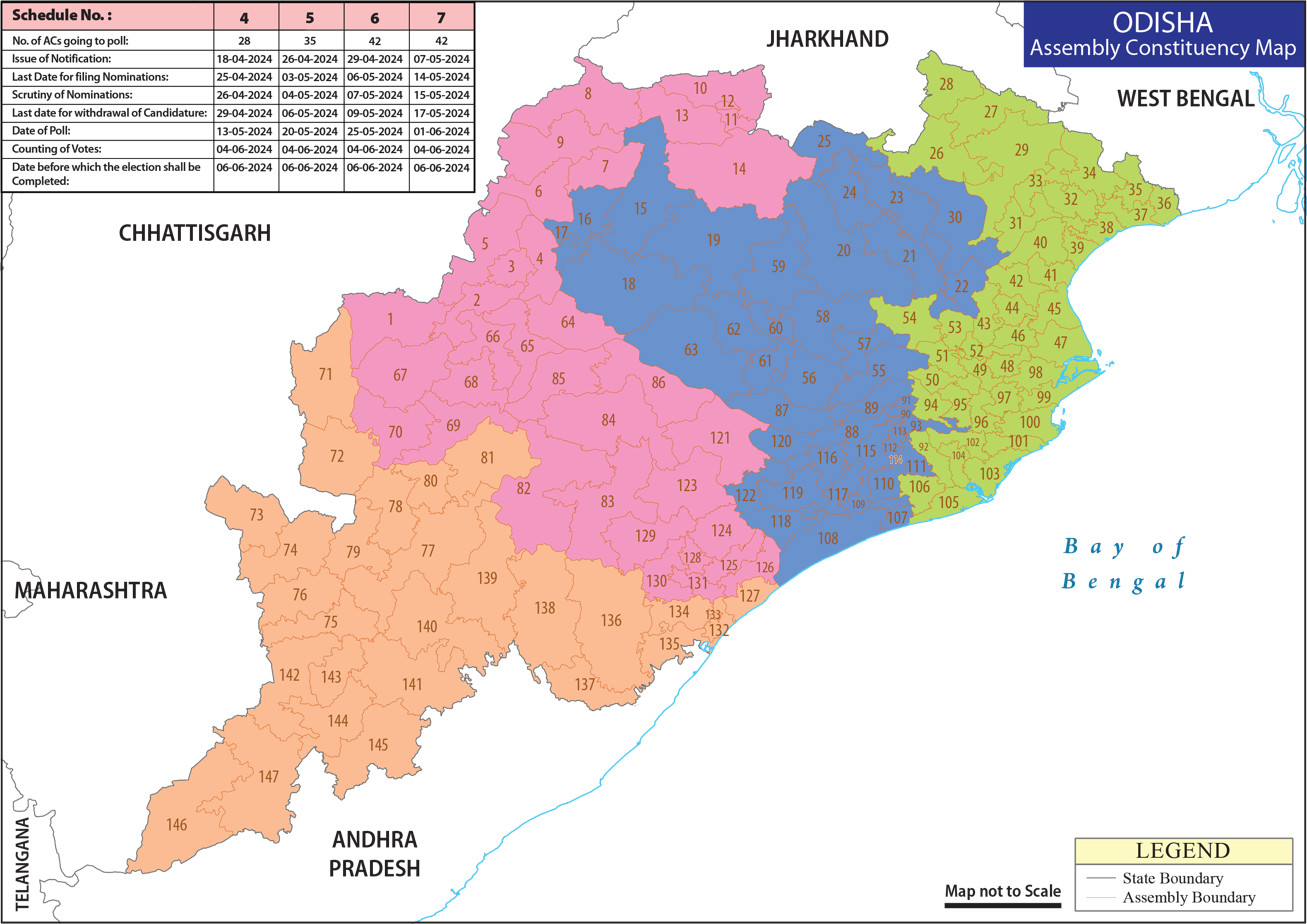
Phase-wise schedule of the 2024 Odisha Legislative Assembly Election.

Legislative assembly constituencies in Odisha.

The schedule of the election was announced by the Election Commission of India on 16 March 2024. The polling was held in four phases which coincided with the phases 4 to 7 of the simultaneously held Indian General Election.

2024 Odisha Legislative Assembly Election Schedule
Poll Event	Phase			
Poll Event	Phase 1 (Southern/Western)	Phase 2 (Central/Western)	Phase 3 (Northern/Central)	Phase 4 (Coastal/North-Eastern)
Notification Date	18 April	26 April	29 April	7 May
Last Date for Filing Nomination	25 April	3 May	6 May	14 May
Scrutiny of Nomination	26 April	4 May	7 May	15 May
Last Date for Withdrawal of Nomination	29 April	6 May	9 May	17 May
Date of Poll	13 May	20 May	25 May	1 June
Date of Counting of Votes	4 June 2024			

== Parties and campaigns ==
Party	Flag	Symbol	Leader	Seats contested
Biju Janata Dal			Naveen Patnaik	147
Bharatiya Janata Party			Manmohan Samal	147
Indian National Congress			Sarat Pattanayak	145
Bahujan Samaj Party			Tankadhar Bag	88
Aam Aadmi Party			Nishikanta Mohapatra	41
Communist Party of India (Marxist)			Ali Kishor Patnaik	7
Jharkhand Mukti Morcha				5

The Biju Janata Dal (BJD) and the Bharatiya Janata Party (BJP) contested all 147 assembly constituencies, while the Indian National Congress (INC) fielded candidates in 145 constituencies and supported other parties in the remaining two seats. The BJD's election manifesto included promises relating to youth empowerment, agricultural support, women's economic participation, tribal welfare, infrastructure, sports development, food security and governance reforms. The BJP manifesto proposed measures including the implementation of the "Samruddha Krushak Niti", the "Subhadra Yojana" scheme for women, development of the fishing industry, expansion of road connectivity, employment generation and promotion of tourism.

The role of V. K. Pandian, a former Indian Administrative Service officer and close aide to Chief Minister Naveen Patnaik, became a subject of political debate during the campaign. After resigning from the civil service in 2023, Pandian joined the BJD and assumed a prominent role in the party's campaign activities. The BJP alleged that the BJD was preparing Pandian as Patnaik's successor and criticised his influence within the government. During the campaign, Prime Minister Narendra Modi alleged irregularities relating to the management of the Jagannath Temple's Ratna Bhandar, remarks widely interpreted as targeting Pandian. Pandian rejected the allegations, while Patnaik stated that Pandian was not his political successor.

== Candidates ==
Overall 1,283 candidates contested the elections for the 147 seats in the assembly. Out of these, 348 candidates (approximately 27%) had declared criminal cases against themselves and 292 (approximately 23%) had serious criminal cases against themselves. The Association for Democratic Reforms (ADR) and Odisha Election Watch reported that 66 candidates have declared cases for the crime committed against women, with 4 candidates declaring that they have been charged for rape. In their affidavit filed before elections, 10 candidates have declared that they have cases related to murder. 5 candidates informed in their candidature about cases filed against them related to hate speech. Party-wise, the percentages of candidates with criminal cases are: Bharatiya Janata Party (BJP) have ~68%, Indian National Congress (INC) with ~41%, Biju Janata Dal (BJD) have ~31%, and the Aam Aadmi Party (AAP) is with ~17.

As per the affidavits, 412 (BJD - 128, BJP - 96, INC- 88, AAP - 11, Others - 89) had declared their family's assets to be worth more than ₹1 crore (US$110,000) and average assets were worth ₹2.89 crore (US$310,000). Highest assets were declared by Dilip Kumar Ray (BJP, Rourkela seat, ₹313 crore (US$33 million)) followed by Sanatan Mahakud (BJD, Champua seat, ₹227 crore (US$24 million)) and Subasini Jena (BJD, Basta seat, ₹135 crore (US$14 million)). Education wise, 652 candidates (approximately 51%) had education of graduate or above and only 2 were illiterate. 51 candidates had diplomas and 566 contestants had studied classes from 5th to 12th. Only 14% of candidates (i.e. 178) were women. BJD had been the strong supporter of the Women's Reservation Bill, 2023 and had nominated 34 women candidates (approximately 23%) out of 147 and majority of these were from political families. BJP provided tickets to 10 women candidates.

Candidates by constituency and major parties/alliances
District	Constituency							
District	Constituency		BJD		BJP		INDIA	
Bargarh	1	Padampur	BJD	Barsha Singh Bariha	BJP	Gobardhan Bhoy	INC	Tankadhar Sahu
Bargarh	2	Bijepur	BJD	Rita Sahu	BJP	Sanat Kumar Gartia	INC	Kishor Dafadar
Bargarh	3	Bargarh	BJD	Debesh Acharya	BJP	Ashwini Kumar Sarangi	INC	Nipon Kumar Dash
Bargarh	4	Attabira (SC)	BJD	Snehangini Chhuria	BJP	Nihar Ranjan Mahananda	INC	Abhishek Seth
Bargarh	5	Bhatli	BJD	Susanta Singh	BJP	Irasis Acharya	INC	Brahma Mahakud
Jharsuguda	6	Brajarajnagar	BJD	Alka Mohanty	BJP	Suresh Pujari	INC	Kishore Chandra Patel
Jharsuguda	7	Jharsuguda	BJD	Dipali Das	BJP	Tankadhar Tripathy	INC	Amita Biswal
Sundargarh	8	Talsara (ST)	BJD	Binay Kumar Toppo	BJP	Bhabani Shankar Bhoi	INC	Devendra Bhitaria
Sundargarh	9	Sundargarh (ST)	BJD	Jogesh Kumar Singh	BJP	Kusum Tete	INC	Sudharani Raudia
Sundargarh	10	Biramitrapur (ST)	BJD	Rohit Joseph Tirkey	BJP	Shankar Oram	(Note: Congress gave support to JMM candidate Nihar Surin in Biramitrapur but his candidature was rejected.)	
Sundargarh	11	Raghunathpali (SC)	BJD	Archana Rekha Behara	BJP	Durga Charan Tanti	INC	Gopal Das
Sundargarh	12	Rourkela	BJD	Sarada Prashad Nayak	BJP	Dilip Ray	INC	Birendra Nath Pattnaik
Sundargarh	13	Rajgangpur (ST)	BJD	Anil Baraa	BJP	Narasingha Minz	INC	C S Razeen Ekka
Sundargarh	14	Bonai (ST)	BJD	Bhimsen Chaudhary	BJP	Sebati Nayak	CPI(M)	Laxman Munda (Note: Congress gave support to CPI(M) candidate Laxman Munda in Bonai.)
Sambalpur	15	Kuchinda (ST)	BJD	Rajendra Kumar Chatria	BJP	Rabinarayan Nayak	INC	Kedarnath Bariha
Sambalpur	16	Rengali (SC)	BJD	Sudarshan Haripal	BJP	Nauri Nayak	INC	Dillip Kumar Duria
Sambalpur	17	Sambalpur	BJD	Rohit Pujari	BJP	Jayanarayan Mishra	INC	Durga Prasad Padhi
Sambalpur	18	Rairakhol	BJD	Prasanna Acharya	BJP	Debendra Mohapatra	INC	Assaf Ali Khan
Deogarh	19	Deogarh	BJD	Romanch Ranjan Biswal	BJP	Subhash Chandra Panigrahi	INC	Sem Hembram
Keonjhar	20	Telkoi (ST)	BJD	Madhab Sardar	BJP	Fakir Mohan Naik	INC	Nirmal Chandra Nayak
Keonjhar	21	Ghasipura	BJD	Badri Narayan Patra	BJP	Shambhunath Rout	INC	Subrata Chakra
Keonjhar	22	Anandpur (SC)	BJD	Abhimanyu Sethi	BJP	Alok Kumar Sethi	INC	Jayadev Jena
Keonjhar	23	Patna (ST)	BJD	Jagannath Nayak	BJP	Akhil Chandra Naik	INC	Hrushikesh Naik
Keonjhar	24	Keonjhar (ST)	BJD	Meena Majhi	BJP	Mohan Charan Majhi	INC	Smt. Pratibha Manjari Nayak
Keonjhar	25	Champua	BJD	Sanatan Mahakund	BJP	Murali Manohar Sharma	INC	Yashwant Laghuri
Mayurbhanj	26	Jashipur (ST)	BJD	Chakradhar Hembrom	BJP	Ganeshram Singh Khuntia	INC	Smt. Shweta Chattar
Mayurbhanj	27	Saraskana (ST)	BJD	Debashish Marandi	BJP	Bhadav Hansdah	INC	Ram Kumar Soren
Mayurbhanj	28	Rairangpur (ST)	BJD	Raisin Murmu	BJP	Jolen Barda	INC	Jogendra Banra
Mayurbhanj	29	Bangriposi (ST)	BJD	Ranjita Marandi	BJP	Sanjali Murmu	INC	Murali Dhar Naik
Mayurbhanj	30	Karanjia (ST)	BJD	Basanti Hembrom	BJP	Padmacharan Haibru	INC	Laxmidhar Singh
Mayurbhanj	31	Udala (ST)	BJD	Shrinath Soren	BJP	Bhaskar Madhei	INC	Durga Charan Tudu
Mayurbhanj	32	Badasahi (SC)	BJD	Anusuya Patra	BJP	Sanatan Bijuli	INC	Kshirod Chandra Patra
Mayurbhanj	33	Baripada (ST)	BJD	Sanand Marandi	BJP	Prakash Soren	INC	Pramod Kumar Hembram
Mayurbhanj	34	Morada	BJD	Preetinanda Kanungo	BJP	Krushna Chandra Mohapatra	INC	Pravas Kar Mahapatra
Balasore	35	Jaleswar	BJD	Aswini Kumar Patra	BJP	Braja Pradhan	INC	Sudarshan Das
Balasore	36	Bhograi	BJD	Goutam Buddha Das	BJP	Ashish Patra	INC	Satya Shiba Das
Balasore	37	Basta	BJD	Subasini Jena	BJP	Rabindra Andia	INC	Bijan Nayak
Balasore	38	Balasore	BJD	Swarup Kumar Das	BJP	Manas Kumar Dutta	INC	Monalisa Lenka
Balasore	39	Remuna (SC)	BJD	Bidya Smita Mallick	BJP	Gobinda Chandra Das	INC	Sudarshan Jena
Balasore	40	Nilgiri	BJD	Sukant Nayak	BJP	Santosh Khatua	INC	Akshaya Acharya
Balasore	41	Soro (SC)	BJD	Madhab Dhada	BJP	Parshuram Dhada	INC	Subrat Dhada
Balasore	42	Simulia	BJD	Subhashini Sahu	BJP	Padmalochan Panda	INC	Himanshu Sekhar Behera
Bhadrak	43	Bhandaripokhari	BJD	Sanjib Kumar Mallick	BJP	Sudhanshu Nayak	INC	Niranjan Patnaik
Bhadrak	44	Bhadrak	BJD	Prafulla Samal	BJP	Sitansu Sekhar Mohapatra	INC	Asit Patnaik
Bhadrak	45	Basudevpur	BJD	Bishnubrata Routray	BJP	Banikalyan Mohanty	INC	Ashok Kumar Das
Bhadrak	46	Dhamnagar (SC)	BJD	Sanjay Kumar Das	BJP	Suryabanshi Suraj	INC	Ranjan Kumar Behera
Bhadrak	47	Chandabali	BJD	Byomakesh Ray	BJP	Manmohan Samal	INC	Amiya Kumar Mohapatra
Jajpur	48	Binjharpur (SC)	BJD	Pramila Mallik	BJP	Babita Mallick	INC	Kanaklata Mallick
Jajpur	49	Bari	BJD	Biswa Ranjan Mallick	BJP	Umesh Chandra Jena	INC	Debashish Nayak
Jajpur	50	Barchana	BJD	Varsha Priyadarshini	BJP	Amar Kumar Nayak	INC	Ajay Samal
Jajpur	51	Dharmasala	BJD	Pranab Kumar Balbantaray	BJP	Smruti Rekha Pahi	INC	Kisan Panda
Jajpur	52	Jajpur	BJD	Sujata Sahu	BJP	Goutam Ray	INC	Sudip Kumar Kar
Jajpur	53	Korei	BJD	Sandhyarani Das	BJP	Akash Das Nayak	INC	Bandita Parida
Jajpur	54	Sukinda	BJD	Pritiranjan Gharai	BJP	Pradeep Balasamanta	INC	Bibhu Bushan Rout
Dhenkanal	55	Dhenkanal	BJD	Sudhir Kmar Samal	BJP	Krushna Chandra Patra	INC	Susmita Singh Deo
Dhenkanal	56	Hindol (SC)	BJD	Mahesh Sahu	BJP	Seemarani Nayak	INC	Gobardhan Sekhar Naik
Dhenkanal	57	Kamakshyanagar	BJD	Prafulla Kumar Mallick	BJP	Satrughan Jena	INC	Biprabar Sahu
Dhenkanal	58	Parjanga	BJD	Nrusingha Charan Sahu	BJP	Bibhuti Bhusan Pradhan	INC	Ranjit Kumar Sahu
Angul	59	Pallahara	BJD	Mukesh Kumar Bal	BJP	Ashok Mohanty	INC	Fakir Samal
Angul	60	Talcher	BJD	Brajakishore Pradhan	BJP	Kalandi Charan Samal	INC	Prafula Chandra Das
Angul	61	Angul	BJD	Sanjukta Singh	BJP	Pratap Chandra Pradhan	INC	Ambika Prasad Bhatta
Angul	62	Chhendipada (SC)	BJD	Susanta Kumar Behara	BJP	Agasti Behera	INC	Narottam Nayak
Angul	63	Athmallik	BJD	Nalini Kanta Pradhan	BJP	Sanjeeb Sahoo	INC	Himanshu Chaulia
Subarnapur	64	Birmaharajpur (SC)	BJD	Padmanabha Behara	BJP	Raghunath Jagdala	INC	Pradeep Sethi
Subarnapur	65	Subarnapur	BJD	Niranjan Pujari	BJP	Pramod Mahapatra	INC	Priyabrata Sahu
Balangir	66	Loisingha (SC)	BJD	Nihar Ranjan Behara	BJP	Mukesh Mahaling	INC	Om Prakash Kumbhar
Balangir	67	Patnagarh	BJD	Saroj Kumar Meher	BJP	Kanak Vardhan Singh Deo	INC	Anil Meher
Balangir	68	Bolangir	BJD	Kalikesh Narayan Singh Deo	BJP	Gopalji Panigrahi	INC	Samarendra Mishra
Balangir	69	Titlagarh	BJD	Tukuni Sahu	BJP	Naveen Jain	INC	Birendra Bag
Balangir	70	Kantabanji	BJD	Naveen Patnaik	BJP	Laxman Bag	INC	Santosh Singh Saluja
Nuapada	71	Nuapada	BJD	Rajendra Dholakia	BJP	Abhinandan Kumar Panda	INC	Sarat Pattanayak
Nuapada	72	Khariar	BJD	Adhiraj Mohan Panigrahi	BJP	Hitesh Kumar Bagartti	INC	Kamal Charan Tandi
Nabarangpur	73	Umerkote (ST)	BJD	Nabina Nayak	BJP	Nityananda Gond	INC	Sanaraj Gond
Nabarangpur	74	Jharigam (ST)	BJD	Ramesh Chandra Majhi	BJP	Narsingh Bhatra	INC	Harabati Gond
Nabarangpur	75	Nabarangpur (ST)	BJD	Kaushalya Pradhani	BJP	Gouri Sankar Majhi	INC	Dilip Pradhani
Nabarangpur	76	Dabugam (ST)	BJD	Manohar Gandhari	BJP	Somnath Pujari	INC	Lipika Majhi
Kalahandi	77	Lanjigarh (ST)	BJD	Pradeep Kumar Dishari	BJP	Ramesh Chandra Majhi	INC	Balabhadra Majhi
Kalahandi	78	Junagarh	BJD	Dibya Shankar Mishra	BJP	Manoj Kumar Meher	INC	Tuleswar Naik
Kalahandi	79	Dharmagarh	BJD	Pushpendra Singh Deo	BJP	Sudhir Pattjoshi	INC	Rasmirekha Rout
Kalahandi	80	Bhawanipatna (SC)	BJD	Latika Naik	BJP	Pradipta Kumar Naik	INC	Sagar Charan Das
Kalahandi	81	Narla	BJD	Manorama Mohanty	BJP	Aniruddha Padhan	INC	Bhakta Charan Das
Kandhamal	82	Baliguda (ST)	BJD	Chakramani Kanhar	BJP	Kalpana Kumari Kanhar	INC	Upendra Pradhan
Kandhamal	83	G. Udayagiri (ST)	BJD	Saluga Pradhan	BJP	Managobinda Pradhan	INC	Prafulla Chandra Pradhan
Kandhamal	84	Phulbani (ST)	BJD	Jayshree Kanhar	BJP	Uma Charan Mallick	INC	Prativa Kanhar
Boudh	85	Kantamal	BJD	Mahidhar Rana	BJP	Kanhai Charan Danga	INC	Sarat Kumar Pradhan
Boudh	86	Boudh	BJD	Pradip Kumar Amat	BJP	Saroj Pradhan	INC	Naba Kumar Mishra
Cuttack	87	Badamba	BJD	Debiprasad Mishra	BJP	Sambit Tripathy	INC	Sanjaya Kumar Sahoo
Cuttack	88	Banki	BJD	Devi Ranjan Tripathy	BJP	Tusharkant Chakrabarti	INC	Debasis Patnaik
Cuttack	89	Athgarh	BJD	Ranendra Pratap Swain	BJP	Abhaya Kumar Barik	INC	Sudarshan Sahoo
Cuttack	90	Barabati-Cuttack	BJD	Prakash Behera	BJP	Purnachandra Mohapatra	INC	Sofia Firdous
Cuttack	91	Choudwar-Cuttack	BJD	Souvik Biswal	BJP	Nayan Kishore Mohanty	INC	Meera Mallick
Cuttack	92	Niali (SC)	BJD	Pramod Kumar Mallick	BJP	Chabi Mallick	INC	Jyoti Ranjan Mallick
Cuttack	93	Cuttack Sadar (SC)	BJD	Chandra Sarathi Behara	BJP	Prakash Chandra Sethi	INC	Rama Chandra Gochhayat
Cuttack	94	Salepur	BJD	Prasanta Behera	BJP	Arindam Roy	INC	Aquib Uzzaman Khan
Cuttack	95	Mahanga	BJD	Ankit Pratap Jena	BJP	Sumant Kumar Ghadei	INC	Debendra Kumar Sahoo
Kendrapara	96	Patkura	BJD	Arvind Mahapatra	BJP	Tejeswar Parida	INC	Ratikanta Kanungo
Kendrapara	97	Kendrapara (SC)	BJD	Ganeshwara Behara	BJP	Geetanjali Sethi	INC	Shipra Mallick
Kendrapara	98	Aali	BJD	Pratap Keshari Deb	BJP	Krushna Chandra Panda	INC	Debasmita Sharma
Kendrapara	99	Rajanagar	BJD	Dhruba Charan Sahu	BJP	Lalit Behera	INC	Ashok Pratihari
Kendrapara	100	Mahakalapada	BJD	Atanu Sabyasachi Nayak	BJP	Durga Prasanna Nayak	INC	Loknath Moharathy
Jagatsinghpur	101	Paradeep	BJD	Gitanjali Routray	BJP	Sampad Kumar Swain	INC	Niranjan Nayak
Jagatsinghpur	102	Tirtol (SC)	BJD	Ramakanta Bhoi	BJP	Rajkishore Behera	INC	Himanshu Bhusan Mallick
Jagatsinghpur	103	Balikuda-Erasama	BJD	Sarada Prasanna Jena	BJP	Satya Sarathi Mohanty	INC	Nalini Swain
Jagatsinghpur	104	Jagatsinghpur	BJD	Prasanta Kumar Muduli	BJP	Amarendra Dash	INC	Pratima Mallick
Puri	105	Kakatpur (SC)	BJD	Tushar Kanti Behara	BJP	Baidhar Mallick	INC	Bishwa Bhushan Das
Puri	106	Nimapara	BJD	Dilip Kumar Nayak	BJP	Pravati Parida	INC	Siddharth Routroy
Puri	107	Puri	BJD	Sunil Mohanty	BJP	Jayanta Kumar Sarangi	INC	Uma Ballav Rath
Puri	108	Brahmagiri	BJD	Umakanta Samantaray	BJP	Upasana Mohapatra	INC	Mitrabhanu Mohapatra
Puri	109	Satyabadi	BJD	Sanjay Kumar Das Burma	BJP	Om Prakash Mishra	INC	Manoj Rath
Puri	110	Pipili	BJD	Rudra Pratap Maharathy	BJP	Ashrit Kumar Pattnayak	INC	Gyan Ranjan Patnaik
Khurda	111	Jayadev (SC)	BJD	Naba Kishore Mallik	BJP	Arabinda Dhali	INC	Krushna Sagaria
Khurda	112	Bhubaneswar Central	BJD	Ananta Narayan Jena	BJP	Jagannath Pradhan	INC	Prakash Chandra Jena
Khurda	113	Bhubaneswar North	BJD	Susanta Kumar Rout	BJP	Priyadarshi Mishra	INC	Ashok Kumar Das
Khurda	114	Ekamra Bhubaneswar	BJD	Ashok Chandra Panda	BJP	Babu Singh	INC	Prasanta Kumar Champati
Khurda	115	Jatani	BJD	Bibhuti Bhushan Balabantaray	BJP	Biswaranjan Badajena	INC	Santosh Jena
Khurda	116	Begunia	BJD	Pradeep Kumar Sahu	BJP	Prakash Chandra Ranabijuli	INC	Pruthvi Ballav Patnaik
Khurda	117	Khurda	BJD	Rajendra Kumar Sahu	BJP	Prasanta Kumar Jagadev	INC	Sonali Sahoo
Khurda	118	Chilika	BJD	Raghunath Sahu	BJP	Prithviraj Harichandan	INC	Pradeep Kumar Swain
Nayagarh	119	Ranpur	BJD	Satyanarayan Pradhan	BJP	Surama Padhy	INC	Bibhu Prasad Mishra
Nayagarh	120	Khandapada	BJD	Sabitri Pradhan	BJP	Dusmanta Swain	INC	Baijayantimala Mohanty
Nayagarh	121	Daspalla (SC)	BJD	Ramesh Chandra Behara	BJP	Raghav Mallick	INC	Nakul Nayak
Nayagarh	122	Nayagarh	BJD	Arun Kumar Sahu	BJP	Pratyusha Rajeshwari Singh	INC	Ranjit Dash
Ganjam	123	Bhanjanagar	BJD	Bikram Keshari Arukha	BJP	Pradyumna Kumar Nayak	INC	Prasanta Kumar Bisoyi
Ganjam	124	Polasara	BJD	Srikanta Sahu	BJP	Gokula Nanda Mallick	INC	Agasti Barada
Ganjam	125	Kabisuryanagar	BJD	Latika Pradhan	BJP	Pratap Chandra Nayak	INC	Sanjaya Kumar Mandal
Ganjam	126	Khalikote	BJD	Suryamani Baidya	BJP	Purna Chandra Sethi	INC	Chitra Sen Behera
Ganjam	127	Chhatrapur	BJD	Subhash Chandra Behara	BJP	Krushna Chandra Nayak	INC	Bhagirathi Behera
Ganjam	128	Aska	BJD	Manjula Swain	BJP	Saroj Kumar Padhi	INC	Surabhi Bisoyi
Ganjam	129	Surada	BJD	Sanghamitra Swain	BJP	Nilamani Bisoyi	INC	Harikrishna Rath
Ganjam	130	Sanakhemundi	BJD	Sulakshana Gitanjali Devi	BJP	Uttam Kumar Panigrahi	INC	Ramesh Chandra Jena
Ganjam	131	Hinjili	BJD	Naveen Patnaik	BJP	Sisir Mishra	INC	Ranjikant Padhi
Ganjam	132	Gopalpur	BJD	Bikram Kumar Panda	BJP	Bibhuti Bhusan Jena	INC	Shayam Sundargarh Sahu
Ganjam	133	Berhampur	BJD	Ramesh Chandra Chyau Patnaik	BJP	K Anil Kumar	INC	Deepak Patnaik
Ganjam	134	Digapahandi	BJD	Biplab Patro	BJP	Sidhant Mohapatra	INC	Saka Sujit Kumar
Ganjam	135	Chikiti	BJD	Chinmaya Nanda Sreerup Deb	BJP	Manoranjan Dyan Samantaray	INC	Ravindra Nath Dyan Samantray
Gajapati	136	Mohana (ST)	BJD	Antaryami Gomango	BJP	Prasanta Mallick	INC	Dasarathi Gamango
Gajapati	137	Paralakhemundi	BJD	Rupesh Panigrahi	BJP	K Narayana Rao	INC	Bijay Patnaik
Rayagada	138	Gunupur (ST)	BJD	Raghunath Gomango	BJP	Trinath Gomanga	INC	Satyajeet Gomango
Rayagada	139	Bissam Cuttack (ST)	BJD	Jagannath Saraka	BJP	Jagannath Nundurka	INC	Nilamadhab Hikaka
Rayagada	140	Rayagada (ST)	BJD	Anusuya Majhi	BJP	Basanta Kumar Ullaka	INC	Kadraka Allapaswamy
Koraput	141	Laxmipur (ST)	BJD	Prabhu Jani	BJP	Kailash Kulesika	INC	Pabitra Saunta
Koraput	142	Kotpad (ST)	BJD	Chandra Sekhar Majhi	BJP	Rupu Bhatra	INC	Anama Dian
Koraput	143	Jeypore	BJD	Indira Nanda	BJP	Goutam Samantray	INC	Tara Prasad Bahinipati
Koraput	144	Koraput (SC)	BJD	Raghu Ram Padal	BJP	Raghuram Macha	INC	Krushna Chandra Kuldeep
Koraput	145	Pottangi (ST)	BJD	Prafulla Kumar Pangi	BJP	Chaitanya Nandibali	INC	Ramchandra Kadam
Malkangiri	146	Malkangiri (ST)	BJD	Manas Madkami	BJP	Narsingh Madkami	INC	Mala Madhi
Malkangiri	147	Chitrakonda (ST)	BJD	Laxmipriya Nayak	BJP	Dambaru Sisa	INC	Mangu Khila

== Surveys and polls ==
The exit polls published after polling concluded on 1 June 2024 projected a close contest between the Bharatiya Janata Party (BJP) and the incumbent Biju Janata Dal (BJD). India Today–Axis My India projected that both parties could win between 62 and 80 seats, raising the possibility of a hung assembly. In contrast, Times Now–ETG projected a substantial victory for the BJD, estimating that it would win between 100 and 115 seats.

Exit polls
Polling agency	BJP	BJD	INC
India Today–Axis My India	62–80	62–80	5–8
Times Now–ETG	30–38	100–115	4–7

== Results ==
Source: Election Commission of India
Alliance/ Party	Popular vote			Seats		
Alliance/ Party	Votes	%	±pp	Contested	Won	+/−
Biju Janata Dal	10,102,454	40.22	▼4.5	147	51	▼61
Bharatiya Janata Party	10,064,827	40.07	▲7.5	147	78	▲55
Indian National Congress	3,331,319	13.26	▼2.8	145	14	▲5
Communist Party of India (Marxist)	93,295	0.37	▲0.07	7	1	Steady
Independents	843,702	3.39	▲0.57	425	3	▲2
NOTA	257,355	1.02	▼0.03			
Total		100	-	-	147	-
Valid Votes (Note: includes NOTA)	25,115,874	74.49				
Invalid Votes	102,151	-				
Total Votes Polled / Turnout	25,218,025	74.79				
Abstentions	8,498,940	-				
Total No. Of Electors	33,716,965					

Vote share by party
1. Biju Janata Dal (40.2%)
2. Bharatiya Janata Party (40.1%)
3. Indian National Congress (13.3%)
4. Other (6.45%)
Seat share by party
1. Bharatiya Janata Party (53.1%)
2. Biju Janata Dal (34.7%)
3. Indian National Congress (9.52%)
4. Other (2.73%)

=== Results by regions & districts ===
Region	Seats				
Region	Seats	BJP	BJD	INC	OTH
Northern Odisha (Note: Northern Division includes Sambalpur, Deogarh, Jharsuguda, Bargarh, Bolangir, Sonepur, Sundargarh, Dhenkanal, Angul, and Keonjhar districts)	41	25	14	2	—N/a
Central Odisha (Note: Central Division includes Cuttack, Jagatsinghpur, Kendrapada, Jajpur, Balasore, Bhadrak, Puri, Khordha, Nayagarh, and Mayurbhanj districts)	65	32	28	2	3
Southern Odisha (Note: Southern Division includes Ganjam, Gajapati, Koraput, Nabarangpur, Rayagada, Malkangiri, Kalahandi, Nuapada, Kandhamal, and Boudh districts)	41	21	9	11	—N/a
Total	147	78	51	15	3

District	Seats				
District	Seats	BJP	BJD	INC	OTH
Baragada	5	4	1	—N/a	—N/a
Jharsuguda	2	2	—N/a	—N/a	—N/a
Sundaragada	7	2	3	2	—N/a
Sambalpur	4	2	2	—N/a	—N/a
Debagada	1	—N/a	1	—N/a	—N/a
Kendujhar	6	3	3	—N/a	—N/a
Mayurbhanj	9	9	—N/a	—N/a	—N/a
Baleshwar	8	4	4	—N/a	—N/a
Bhadrak	5	2	2	1	—N/a
Jajpur	7	3	3	—N/a	1
Dhenkanal	4	4	—N/a	—N/a	—N/a
Anugola	5	3	2	—N/a	—N/a
Subarnapur	2	1	1	—N/a	—N/a
Balangir	5	4	1	—N/a	—N/a
Nuapada	2	—N/a	2	—N/a	—N/a
Nabarangpur	4	3	1	—N/a	—N/a
Kalahandi	5	1	3	1	—N/a
Kandhamal	3	1	1	1	—N/a
Boudh	2	2	—N/a	—N/a	—N/a
Kataka	9	2	4	1	2
Kendrapada	5	1	4	—N/a	—N/a
Jagatsinghpur	4	2	2	—N/a	—N/a
Puri	6	4	2	—N/a	—N/a
Khordha	8	3	5	—N/a	—N/a
Nayagada	4	2	2	—N/a	—N/a
Ganjam	13	11	1	1	—N/a
Gajapati	2	—N/a	1	1	—N/a
Rayagada	3	—N/a	—N/a	3	—N/a
Koraput	5	2	—N/a	3	—N/a
Malkangiri	2	1	—N/a	1	—N/a
Total	147	78	51	15	3

=== Results by constituency ===
District	Constituency		Winner				Runner-up				Margin
District	No.	Name	Candidate	Party	Votes	%	Candidate	Party	Votes	%	Margin
Baragada	1	Padamapur	Barsha Singh Bariha	BJD	91,995	43.53	Gobardhan Bhoy	BJP	81,002	38.33	10,993
Baragada	2	Bijepur	Sanat Kumar Gadatia	BJP	93,161	47.52	Rita Sahu	BJD	83,095	42.39	10,066
Baragada	3	Baragada	Ashwini Kumar Sarangi	BJP	77,766	46.34	Debesh Acharjya	BJD	72,994	43.50	4,772
Baragada	4	Attabira (SC)	Nihar Ranjan Mahananda	BJP	99,487	55.17	Snehangini Chhuria	BJD	70,577	39.14	28,910
Baragada	5	Bhatli	Irashish Acharjya	BJP	1,07,508	54.65	Susanta Sing	BJD	79,616	40.47	27,892
Jharsuguda	6	Brajarajnagar	Suresh Pujari	BJP	82,199	48.85	Alaka Mohanty	BJD	55,410	32.93	26,789
Jharsuguda	7	Jharsuguda	Tankadhar Tripathy	BJP	91,105	47.69	Dipali Das	BJD	89,772	47.00	1,333
Sundaragada	8	Talsara (ST)	Bhabani Sankar Bhoi	BJP	68,928	42.67	Binaya Kumar Toppo	BJD	51,739	32.03	17,189
Sundaragada	9	Sundaragada (ST)	Jogesh Kumar Singh	BJD	86,398	48.15	Kusum Tete	BJP	77,276	43.07	9,122
Sundaragada	10	Biramitrapur (ST)	Rohit Joseph Tirkey	BJD	84,116	44.53	Sankar Oram	BJP	77,232	40.89	6,884
Sundaragada	11	Raghunathpali (SC)	Durga Charan Tanti	BJP	51,189	43.72	Archana Rekha Behera	BJD	45,415	38.79	5,774
Sundaragada	12	Raurkela	Sarada Prasad Nayak	BJD	64,660	46.46	Dilip Ray	BJP	61,108	43.91	3,552
Sundaragada	13	Rajgangpur (ST)	C. S. Raazen Ekka	INC	66,869	36.74	Anil Barwa	BJD	56,685	31.14	10,184
Sundaragada	14	Banaigada (ST)	Laxman Munda	CPM	81,008	43.45	Bhimsen Chaudhary	BJD	57,569	30.88	23,439
Sambalpur	15	Kuchinda (ST)	Rabi Narayan Naik	BJP	95,716	51.83	Rajendra Kumar Chhatria	BJD	63,496	34.39	32,220
Sambalpur	16	Rengali (SC)	Sudarshan Haripal	BJD	73,420	45.45	Nauri Nayak	BJP	70,208	43.46	3,212
Sambalpur	17	Sambalpur	Jayanarayan Mishra	BJP	59,827	45.52	Rohit Pujari	BJD	55,722	42.40	4,105
Sambalpur	18	Redhakhol	Prasanna Acharjya	BJD	61,716	38.23	Debendra Mohapatra	BJP	56,436	35.16	4,960
Debagada	19	Debagada	Romancha Ranjan Biswal	BJD	89,074	45.02	Subhash Chandra Panigrahi	BJP	73,282	37.03	15,792
Kendujhar	20	Telkoi (ST)	Phakir Mohan Naik	BJP	83,818	43.49	Madhaba Sardar	BJD	74,379	38.59	9,439
Kendujhar	21	Ghasipura	Badri Narayan Patra	BJD	82,516	43.96	Soumya Ranjan Patnaik	Ind	68,705	36.60	13,811
Kendujhar	22	Anandapur (SC)	Abhimanyu Sethi	BJD	71,651	39.67	Jayadeba Jena	INC	60,685	33.60	10,966
Kendujhar	23	Patana (ST)	Akhila Chandra Naik	BJP	97,041	55.72	Jagannath Naik	BJD	59,062	33.91	37,979
Kendujhar	24	Kendujhar (ST)	Mohan Charan Majhi	BJP	87,815	47.05	Mina Majhi	BJD	76,238	40.84	11,577
Kendujhar	25	Champua	Sanatan Mahakud	BJD	1,03,120	56.45	Murali Manohar Sharma	BJP	63,126	34.56	39,994
Mayurbhanj	26	Jashipur (ST)	Ganesh Ram Khuntia	BJP	85,384	50.25	Chakradhar Hembram	BJD	50,717	29.85	34,667
Mayurbhanj	27	Saraskana (ST)	Bhadav Hansdah	BJP	59,387	37.79	Debashis Marndi	BJD	45,735	29.11	13,652
Mayurbhanj	28	Rairangpur (ST)	Jalen Naik	BJP	62,724	36.94	Raisen Murmu	BJD	55,031	32.41	7,693
Mayurbhanj	29	Bangiriposi (ST)	Sanjali Murmu	BJP	87,801	49.93	Ranjita Marndi	BJD	53,325	30.33	34,476
Mayurbhanj	30	Karanjia (ST)	Padma Charan Haiburu	BJP	65,357	43.48	Basanti Hembram	BJD	35,858	23.85	29,499
Mayurbhanj	31	Udala (ST)	Bhaskar Madhei	BJP	66,401	42.00	Srinath Soren	BJD	59,884	37.88	6,517
Mayurbhanj	32	Badasahi (SC)	Sanatan Bijuli	BJP	83,276	54.62	Anasuya Patra	BJD	45,889	30.10	37,387
Mayurbhanj	33	Baripada (ST)	Prakash Soren	BJP	78,272	48.39	Sananda Marndi	BJD	48,887	30.22	29,385
Mayurbhanj	34	Moroda	Krushna Chandra Mohapatra	BJP	77,980	43.33	Preetinanda Kanungo	BJD	44,710	24.84	33,270
Baleshwar	35	Jaleshwar	Aswini Kumar Patra	BJD	83,105	42.37	Brajamohan Pradhan	BJP	82,786	42.21	319
Baleshwar	36	Bhogarai	Goutam Buddha Das	BJD	70,198	39.89	Satya Shiba Das	INC	63,634	38.16	6,564
Baleshwar	37	Basta	Subasini Jena	BJD	83,314	43.66	Bijan Nayak	INC	62, 937	32.99	20,377
Baleshwar	38	Baleshwar	Manas Kumar Dutta	BJP	89,360	50.90	Swarup Kumar Das	BJD	60,734	34.59	28,626
Baleshwar	39	Remuna (SC)	Gobinda Chandra Das	BJP	92,620	51.39	Bidyasmita Mahalik	BJD	68,452	37.98	24,168
Baleshwar	40	Nilagiri	Santosh Khatua	BJP	87,928	52.20	Sukanta Kumar Nayak	BJD	68,089	40.42	19,839
Baleshwar	41	Sora (SC)	Madhab Dhada	BJD	63,642	39.07	Parshuram Dhada	BJP	62,840	38.57	802
Baleshwar	42	Simulia	Padma Lochan Panda	BJP	90,676	49.54	Subasini Sahoo	BJD	77,493	42.34	13,183
Bhadrak	43	Bhandaripokhari	Sanjib Kumar Mallick	BJD	72,447	39.07	Niranjan Patnaik	INC	70,896	38.23	1,551
Bhadrak	44	Bhadrak	Sitansu Sekhar Mohapatra	BJP	82,282	42.29	Prafulla Samal	BJD	66,214	34.03	16,068
Bhadrak	45	Basudebapur	Ashok Kumar Das	INC	77,843	39.11	Bishnubrata Routray	BJD	77,212	38.79	631
Bhadrak	46	Dhamanagar (SC)	Surjyabansi Sethy	BJP	90,555	50.31	Sanjaya Kumar Das	BJD	82,460	45.81	8,095
Bhadrak	47	Chandabali	Byomakesh Ray	BJD	83,063	42.72	Manmohan Samal	BJP	81,147	41.74	1,916
Jajpur	48	Binjharpur (SC)	Pramila Mallik	BJD	74,185	48.84	Babita Mallick	BJP	71,329	46.96	2,856
Jajpur	49	Bari	Biswa Ranjan Mallick	BJD	1,01,966	63.77	Umesh Chandra Jena	BJP	50,501	31.58	51,465
Jajpur	50	Badachana	Amar Kumar Nayak	BJP	71,926	49.38	Varsha Priyadarshini	BJD	65,616	45.05	6,310
Jajpur	51	Dharmashala	Himanshu Sekhar Sahoo	Ind	79,759	42.88	Pranab Kumar Balabantaray	BJD	75,609	40.65	4,150
Jajpur	52	Jajapur	Sujata Sahu	BJD	86,049	47.92	Goutam Ray	BJP	83,485	46.49	2,564
Jajpur	53	Korei	Akash Dasnayak	BJP	79,658	48.01	Sandhyarani Das	BJD	74,012	44.61	5,646
Jajpur	54	Sukinda	Pradeep Bal Samanta	BJP	86,733	50.56	Pritiranjan Gharai	BJD	77,156	44.98	9,577
Dhenkanal	55	Dhenkanal	Krushna Chandra Patra	BJP	1,06,529	52.57	Sudhir Kumar Samal	BJD	86,090	42.48	20,439
Dhenkanal	56	Hindol (SC)	Simarani Nayak	BJP	97,795	49.62	Mahesh Sahoo	BJD	85.968	43.62	11,827
Dhenkanal	57	Kamakhyanagar	Satrughna Jena	BJP	84,589	49.00	Prafulla Kumar Mallik	BJD	79,927	46.30	4,662
Dhenkanal	58	Parajanga	Bibhuti Bhusan Pradhan	BJP	1,00,595	56.94	Nrusingha Charan Sahu	BJD	68,433	38.74	32,162
Anugola	59	Palalahada	Ashok Mohanty	BJP	71,560	48.64	Mukesh Kumar Pal	BJD	63,997	43.50	7,563
Anugola	60	Talacher	Braja Kishore Pradhan	BJD	75,621	58.82	Kalandi Charan Samal	BJP	43,499	38.83	32,122
Anugola	61	Anugola	Pratap Chandra Pradhan	BJP	88,868	52.03	Sanjukta Singh	BJD	71,435	41.82	17,433
Anugola	62	Chhendipada (SC)	Agasti Behera	BJP	93,629	52.58	Susanta Kumar Behera	BJD	78,566	44.12	15,063
Anugola	63	Athamallik	Nalini Kanta Pradhan	BJD	93,957	52.35	Sanjeeb Kumar Sahoo	BJP	77,804	43.35	16,153
Subarnapur	64	Birmaharajpur (SC)	Raghunath Jagadala	BJP	85,680	48.19	Padmanabha Behera	BJD	63,734	35.84	21,946
Subarnapur	65	Subarnapur	Niranjan Pujari	BJD	98,202	46.03	Pramod Ku. Mahapatra	BJP	82,963	38.88	15,239
Balangir	66	Loisinga (SC)	Mukesh Mahalinga	BJP	83,313	44.32	Nihar Ranjan Behera	BJD	65,123	34.64	18,190
Balangir	67	Patanagad	Kanak Vardhan Singh Deo	BJP	93,823	41.64	Saroj Kumar Meher	BJD	92,466	41.04	1,357
Balangir	68	Balangir	Kalikesh Narayan Singh Deo	BJD	85,265	45.69	Samarendra Mishra	INC	71,856	38.51	13,409
Balangir	69	Titilagad	Nabin Kumar Jain	BJP	97,854	48.30	Tukuni Sahu	BJD	80,455	39.72	17,399
Balangir	70	Kantabanji	Laxman Bag	BJP	90,876	44.57	Naveen Patnaik	BJD	74,532	36.56	16,344
Nuapada	71	Nuapada	Rajendra Dholakia	BJD	61,822	33.65	Ghasiram Majhi	Ind	50,941	27.73	10,881
Nuapada	72	Khadial	Adhiraj Mohan Panigrahi	BJD	93,246	46.89	Hitesh Kumar Bagartti	BJP	83,628	42.05	9,618
Nabarangpur	73	Umarkot (ST)	Nityananda Gond	BJP	70,170	43.35	Nabina Nayak	BJD	59,797	36.94	10,373
Nabarangpur	74	Jharigan (ST)	Narsing Bhatra	BJP	76,748	42.33	Ramesh Chandra Majhi	BJD	73,470	40.52	3,278
Nabarangpur	75	Nabarangpur (ST)	Gouri Shankar Majhi	BJP	90,895	45.35	Kausalya Pradhani	BJD	65,801	32.83	25,094
Nabarangpur	76	Dabugan (ST)	Manohar Randhari	BJD	77,511	44.95	Lipika Majhi	INC	56,056	32.51	21,455
Kalahandi	77	Lanjigada (ST)	Pradip Kumar Dishari	BJD	60,254	34.09	Balabhadra Majhi	INC	53,753	30.41	6,501
Kalahandi	78	Junagada	Dibya Shankar Mishra	BJD	77,037	38.64	Manoj Kumar Meher	BJP	75,699	37.97	1,338
Kalahandi	79	Dharmagada	Sudhira Ranjan Pattajosi	BJP	87,890	41.84	Puspendra Singh Deo	BJD	68,963	32.83	18,927
Kalahandi	80	Bhabanipatana (SC)	Sagar Charan Das	INC	67,085	37.39	Pradipta Kumar Naik	BJP	53,344	29.73	13,741
Kalahandi	81	Narla	Manorama Mohanty	BJD	67,532	36.47	Bhakta Charan Das	INC	62,327	33.66	5,205
Kandhamal	82	Baliguda (ST)	Chakramani Kanhar	BJD	43,586	35.88	Upendra Pradhan	INC	41,915	34.51	1,671
Kandhamal	83	Ghumusur Udayagiri (ST)	Prafulla Chandra Pradhan	INC	53,530	37.06	Managobinda Pradhan	BJP	45,673	31.62	7,857
Kandhamal	84	Kandhamala (ST)	Uma Charan Mallick	BJP	53,900	36.81	Jayashree Kanhar	BJD	51,042	34.85	2,858
Boudh	85	Kantamal	Kanhai Charan Danga	BJP	68,356	48.28	Mahidhar Rana	BJD	61,207	43.23	7,149
Boudh	86	Boudh	Saroj Kumar Pradhan	BJP	62,494	46.36	Pradip Kumar Amat	BJD	59,729	44.31	2,765
Kataka	87	Badamba	Bijaya Kumar Dalabehera	Ind	86,018	46.51	Debiprasad Mishra	BJD	62,539	33.81	23,479
Kataka	88	Banki	Debi Ranjan Tripathy	BJD	69,214	41.31	Tusara Kanta Chakrabarty	BJP	52,188	31.15	17,026
Kataka	89	Athagada	Ranendra Pratap Swain	BJD	86,006	49.46	Abhaya Kumar Barik	BJP	82,422	47.40	3,584
Kataka	90	Barabati-Kataka	Sofia Firdous	INC	53,339	37.86	Purna Chandra Mahapatra	BJP	45,338	32.18	8,001
Kataka	91	Choudwar-Kataka	Souvic Biswal	BJD	72,325	51.71	Nayan Kishore Mohanty	BJP	54,509	38.97	17,816
Kataka	92	Niali (SC)	Chhabi Malik	BJP	90,191	47.71	Pramod Kumar Mallick	BJD	88,739	46.95	1,452
Kataka	93	Kataka Sadar (SC)	Prakash Chandra Sethi	BJP	79,542	48.49	Chandra Sarathi Behera	BJD	75,733	46.17	3,809
Kataka	94	Salepur	Prasanta Behera	BJD	87,701	45.75	Arindam Roy	BJP	80,107	41.79	7,594
Kataka	95	Mahanga	Sarada Prasad Padhan	Ind	88,632	42.86	Ankit Pratap Jena	BJD	81,209	39.27	7,423
Kendrapada	96	Patkura	Arabinda Mohapatra	BJD	90,905	49.64	Tejeswar Parida	BJP	77,083	42.09	13,822
Kendrapada	97	Kendrapada (SC)	Ganeswar Behera	BJD	90,173	58.49	Geetanjali Sethi	BJP	54,755	35.52	35,418
Kendrapada	98	Aali	Pratap Keshari Deb	BJD	73,678	42.37	Debasmita Sharma	INC	54,050	31.08	19,628
Kendrapada	99	Rajanagar	Dhruba Charan Sahoo	BJD	81,237	46.46	Lalit Kumar Behera	BJP	62,996	36.03	18,241
Kendrapada	100	Mahakalapada	Durga Prasan Nayak	BJP	1,09,653	57.23	Atanu Sabyasachi Nayak	BJD	76,127	39.73	33,526
Jagatsinghpur	101	Paradeep	Sampad Chandra Swain	BJP	84,518	51.55	Geetanjali Routray	BJD	68,731	41.92	15,787
Jagatsinghpur	102	Tirtol (SC)	Ramakanta Bhoi	BJD	83,740	45.48	Rajkishore Behera	BJP	55,245	30.01	28,495
Jagatsinghpur	103	Balikuda-Erasama	Sarada Prasanna Jena	BJD	93,517	46.04	Satya Sarathi Mohanty	BJP	67,558	33.26	25,959
Jagatsinghpur	104	Jagatsinghpur	Amarendra Das	BJP	92,555	54.34	Prasanta Kumar Muduli	BJD	70,417	41.34	22,138
Puri	105	Kakatapur (SC)	Tusharkanti Behera	BJD	84,010	47.05	Baidhar Malik	BJP	60,859	34.08	23,151
Puri	106	Nimapada	Pravati Parida	BJP	95,430	48.45	Dilip Kumar Nayak	BJD	90,842	46.12	4,588
Puri	107	Puri	Sunil Mohanty	BJD	74,709	45.84	Jayanta Kumar Sarangi	BJP	69,531	42.66	5,178
Puri	108	Bramhagiri	Upasna Mohapatra	BJP	95,783	51.53	Umakanta Samantaray	BJD	85,953	46.25	9,830
Puri	109	Satyabadi	Om Prakash Mishra	BJP	87,294	53.33	Sanjaya Kumar Dash Barma	BJD	69,586	42.52	17,708
Puri	110	Pipili	Ashrit Pattanayak	BJP	99,310	51.55	Rudra Pratap Maharathy	BJD	84,148	43.68	15,162
Khordha	111	Jayadev (SC)	Naba Kishor Mallick	BJD	76,790	52.02	Arabinda Dhali	BJP	55,317	37.47	21,473
Khordha	112	Bhubaneswar Madhya	Ananta Narayana Jena	BJD	53,759	47.68	Jagannath Pradhan	BJP	53,722	47.65	37
Khordha	113	Bhubaneswar Uttar	Susanta Kumara Rout	BJD	78,179	50.63	Priyadarshi Mishra	BJP	66,836	43.28	11,343
Khordha	114	Ekamra Bhubaneswar	Babu Singh	BJP	74,884	49.03	Ashok Chandra Panda	BJD	69,861	45.74	5,023
Khordha	115	Jatani	Bibhuti Bhusan Balabantaray	BJD	68,162	39.06	Biswaranjan Badajena	BJP	42,941	24.61	25,221
Khordha	116	Begunia	Pradip Kumar Sahu	BJD	90,964	57.45	Prakasha Chandra Bijuli	BJP	43,150	27.25	47,814
Khordha	117	Khordha	Prasanta Kumar Jagaddeba	BJP	80,564	44.30	Rajendra Kumar Sahoo	BJD	71,966	39.57	8,598
Khordha	118	Chilika	Pruthibiraj Harichandan	BJP	83,264	49.51	Raghunath Sahu	BJD	78,698	46.80	4,536
Nayagada	119	Ranpur	Surama Padhy	BJP	81,439	52.27	Satyanarayan Pradhan	BJD	65,895	42.29	15,544
Nayagada	120	Khandapada	Dusmanta Kumar Swain	BJP	75,557	50.72	Sabitri Pradhan	BJD	68,214	45.79	7,343
Nayagada	121	Dashapalla (SC)	Ramesh Chandra Behera	BJD	62,039	44.40	Raghab Malik	BJP	55,743	38.89	6,296
Nayagada	122	Nayagada	Arun Kumar Sahoo	BJD	81,959	48.74	Pratyusa Rajeswari Sing	BJP	81,520	48.48	439
Ganjam	123	Bhanjanagar	Pradyumna Kumar Nayak	BJP	83,822	51.06	Bikram Keshari Arukha	BJD	67,498	41.11	16,324
Ganjam	124	Polasara	Gokula Nanda Mallik	BJP	85,737	53.33	Srikanta Sahu	BJD	64,791	40.30	20,946
Ganjam	125	Kabisurjyanagar	Pratap Chandra Nayak	BJP	80,995	55.79	Latika Pradhan	BJD	50,822	35.00	30,173
Ganjam	126	Khallikot	Purna Chandra Sethy	BJP	80,230	53.82	Surjyamani Baidya	BJD	57,173	38.36	23,057
Ganjam	127	Chhatrapur	Krushna Chandra Nayak	BJP	74,983	48.00	Subash Chandra Behera	BJD	63,545	40.68	11,438
Ganjam	128	Asika	Saroj Kumar Padhi	BJP	59,083	49.21	Manjula Swain	BJD	51,024	42.50	8,059
Ganjam	129	Sorada	Nilamani Bisoyi	BJP	83,625	54.71	Sanghamitra Swain	BJD	54,401	36.25	28,224
Ganjam	130	Sanakhemundi	Ramesh Chandra Jena	INC	65,867	44.65	Sulakhyana Geetanjali Debi	BJD	55,205	37.42	10,662
Ganjam	131	Hinjili	Naveen Patnaik	BJD	66,459	46.85	Sisir Kumar Mishra	BJP	61,823	43.59	4,636
Ganjam	132	Gopalpur	Bibhuti Bhusan Jena	BJP	72,071	50.11	Bikram Kumar Panda	BJD	63,009	43.81	9,062
Ganjam	133	Brahmapur	K. Anil Kumar	BJP	54,997	43.93	Ramesh Chandra Chyau Patnaik	BJD	36,288	28.99	18,709
Ganjam	134	Digapahandi	Sidhant Mohapatra	BJP	72,908	49.21	Biplab Patro	BJD	56,061	37.84	16,847
Ganjam	135	Chikiti	Manoranjan Dyan Samantara	BJP	69,839	49.67	Chinmayananda Srirup Deb	BJD	63,317	45.03	6,522
Gajapati	136	Mohana (ST)	Dasarathi Gomango	INC	62,117	34.64	Prasanta Kumar Mallik	BJP	58,058	32.38	4,059
Gajapati	137	Paralakhemundi	Rupesh Kumar Panigrahi	BJD	56,027	37.58	Koduru Narayana Rao	BJP	52,029	34.90	3,998
Rayagada	138	Gunupur (ST)	Satyajeet Gomango	INC	77,637	47.80	Raghunath Gomango	BJD	47,752	29.40	29,885
Rayagada	139	Bissam Katak (ST)	Nilamadhab Hikaka	INC	68,446	37.25	Jagannath Saraka	BJD	59,043	32.13	9,403
Rayagada	140	Rayagada (ST)	Kadraka Appala Swamy	INC	87,482	45.81	Anusaya Majhi	BJD	58,296	30.52	29,186
Koraput	141	Lakhmipur (ST)	Pabitra Saunta	INC	59,447	41.77	Prabhu Jani	BJD	38,185	26.83	21,262
Koraput	142	Kotpad (ST)	Rupa Bhatra	BJP	75,275	42.13	Chandra Sekhar Majhi	BJD	49,011	27.43	26,264
Koraput	143	Jayapur	Tara Prasad Bahinipati	INC	69,592	41.89	Indira Nanda	BJD	56,481	34.00	13,111
Koraput	144	Koraput (SC)	Raghuram Machhha	BJP	46,805	31.82	Raghu Ram Padal	BJD	44,281	30.11	2,524
Koraput	145	Pottangi (ST)	Rama Chandra Kadam	INC	52,202	33.70	Prafulla Kumar Pangi	BJD	50,283	32.46	1,919
Malkangiri	146	Malkangiri (ST)	Narasinga Madkami	BJP	78,679	41.76	Mala Madhi	INC	63,789	33.85	14,890
Malkangiri	147	Chitrakonda (ST)	Mangu Khilla	INC	55,550	35.34	Dambaru Sisa	BJP	46,391	29.52	9,159

== Aftermath ==
On 4 June 2024, the Bharatiya Janata Party (BJP) won 78 seats, crossing the majority mark of 74 in the 147-member assembly and ending the 24-year tenure of the BJD government. Mohan Charan Majhi, a four-time MLA representing the Kendujhar constituency, was selected as the legislative leader and sworn in on 12 June 2024 as the Chief Minister. Kanak Vardhan Singh Deo and Pravati Parida were sworn in concurrently as Deputy Chief Ministers.

The BJP's functional strength subsequently rose to 81 seats after three independent MLAs—Himanshu Sekhar Sahoo (Dharmashala), Bijaya Kumar Dalabehera (Badamba), and Sarada Prasad Pradhan (Mahanga)—officially extended their support and joined the party following the declaration of results.

The election outcome triggered a substantial internal reorganization within the BJD. Party cadres and political commentators attributed the electoral defeat primarily to the unchecked organizational influence of V. K. Pandian, a former bureaucrat turned political strategist who served as the close aide to outgoing Chief Minister Naveen Patnaik. Critics within the BJD pointed to a perceived "bureaucratisation" of the state machinery, which they argued alienated the grassroots leadership and stalled internal democratic processes. Following mounting public and internal pressure, Pandian announced his formal resignation from active politics on 9 June 2024.

Academic and media analyses identified three key factors driving the shift in voters' mandate:

- Odia Asmita (Identity Politics): The BJP effectively structured its campaign around the rhetoric of protecting Odia Asmita (Odia pride), framing the rise of Tamil-born Pandian as an existential threat to indigenous political leadership.
- Candidate Selection and Anti-Incumbency: While the BJD nominated 34 female candidates to build upon its traditional women's voter base, only 5 managed to win. Reports highlighted that the party frequently prioritized candidates from established dynasties, ignoring local electability factors and failing to counter a widespread anti-incumbency sentiment.
- Religious Consolidation: Observers also noted a high degree of voting consolidation in western Odisha following communal tensions in Sambalpur during 2023, which allowed the BJP to gain substantial ground in previously contested constituencies.

== See also ==
- Elections in Odisha
- 2024 elections in India
- List of chief ministers of Odisha
- Government of Odisha
