= Sitansu Sekhar Mohapatra =

Indian politician

Sitanshu Sekhar Mohapatra

Member of Odisha Legislative Assembly
- Incumbent
- Assumed office 4 June 2024
- Preceded by: Sanjib Kumar Mallick
- Constituency: Bhadrak

Personal details
- Party: Bharatiya Janata Party
- Spouse: Amrita Pritam Mohapatra
- Profession: Politician

Sitansu Sekhar Mohapatra is an Indian politician from Odisha. He is a Member of the Odisha Legislative Assembly from 2024, representing Bhadrak Assembly constituency as a Member of the Bharatiya Janata Party.

== See also ==
- 2024 Odisha Legislative Assembly election
- Odisha Legislative Assembly
