= Badasahi Assembly constituency =

Constituency of the Odisha legislative assembly in India

Coordinates: 21.73°N 86.74°E

Badasahi
- Constituency No. 32 for the Odisha Legislative Assembly

Constituency details
- Country: India
- Region: East India
- State: Odisha
- Division: Central Division
- District: Mayurbhanj
- Lok Sabha constituency: Balasore
- Established: 2008
- Total electors: 2,00,130 (Note: as on 2024) (Note: as data published by election commission)
- Reservation: SC

Member of Legislative Assembly
- 17th Odisha Legislative Assembly
- Incumbent Sanatan Bijuli
- Party: Bharatiya Janata Party
- Elected year: 2024

Badasahi is a Legislative Assembly constituency of Mayurbhanj district, Odisha.

Area of this constituency includes Betnoti block and 21 GPs (Badasahi, Balabhadrapur, Bhimda, Bireswarpur, Chandanpur, Chhelia (A), Deulia, Durgapur, Jogniugaon, Kendudiha, Kochilakhuntha, Madhapur, Mangovindpur, Manitri, Patisari, Paunsia, Salgaon, Sialighaty, Suhagpur, Talapada and Pratappur) of Badasahi block of Mayurbhanj district.

The constituency was formed in 2008 Delimitation after subsuming Baisinga Assembly constituency and went for polls in 2009 election.

== Elected members ==
Since its formation in 2008, 4 elections were held till date.

List of members elected from Badasahi constituency is:

Election	Name	Party
Till 2009 : See Baisinga
2009	Manoranjan Sethi	Biju Janata Dal
2014	Ganeswar Patra	Biju Janata Dal
2019	Sanatan Bijuli	Bharatiya Janata Party
2024	Sanatan Bijuli	Bharatiya Janata Party

== Election results ==
Vote share of winning candidates
2024	54.62%
2019	46.99%
2014	38.79%
2009	45.27%

=== 2024 ===
Voting were held on 1st June 2024 in 4th phase of Odisha Assembly Election & 7th phase of Indian General Election. Counting of votes was on 4th June 2024. In 2024 election, Bharatiya Janata Party candidate Sanatan Bijuli defeated Biju Janata Dal candidate Anusaya Patra by a margin of 11,119 votes.

2024 Odisha Legislative Assembly election: Badasahi
Party	Candidate	Votes	%	±%
BJP	Sanatan Bijuli	83,276	54.62	
BJD	Anusuya Patra	45,889	30.1	
INC	Kshirod Chandra Patra	18,738	12.29	
NOTA	None of the above	1,908	1.25	
Majority		37,387	24.52	
Turnout		1,52,457	76.18	
BJP hold				

=== 2019 ===
In 2019 election, Bharatiya Janata Party candidate Sanatan Bijuli defeated Biju Janata Dal candidate Brundaban Das by a margin of 11,119 votes.

2019 Odisha Legislative Assembly election: Badasahi
Party	Candidate	Votes	%	±%
BJP	Sanatan Bijuli	69,072	46.99	
BJD	Brundaban Das	57,953	39.43	
INC	Devyani Behera	12,709	8.65	
NOTA	None of the above	1,861	1.27	
Majority		11,119	7.56 (Note: %of total valid votes)	
Turnout		1,46,980	77.29	
BJP gain from BJD				

=== 2014 ===
In 2014 election, Biju Janata Dal candidate Ganeswar Patra defeated Indian National Congress candidate Jaminikanta Naik by a margin of 16,834 votes.

2014 Odisha Legislative Assembly election: Badasahi
Party	Candidate	Votes	%	±%
BJD	Ganeswar Patra	52,694	38.79	
INC	Jaminikanta Naik	35,860	26.4	
BJP	Brundaban Das	33,962	25	
NOTA	None of the above	1,565	1.15	
Majority		16,834	12.39 (Note: %of total valid votes)	−
Turnout		1,35,856	80.39	−
BJD hold				

=== 2009 ===
In 2009 election, Biju Janata Dal candidate Manoranjan Sethi defeated Indian National Congress candidate Ganeswar Patra by a margin of 15,499 votes.

2009 Odisha Legislative Assembly election: Badasahi
Party	Candidate	Votes	%	±%
BJD	Manoranjan Sethi	48,382	45.27	−
INC	Ganeswar Patra	32,883	30.77	−
Independent	Manas Ranjan Behera	9,113	8.53	−
JMM	Kshirod Chandra Patra	8,051	7.53	−
Majority		15,499	14.50 (Note: %of total valid votes)	−
Turnout		1,06,878	71.25	−
BJD win (new seat)				
