= Remuna Assembly constituency =

Constituency of the Odisha legislative assembly in India

Coordinates: 21.53°N 86.87°E

Remuna
- Constituency No. 39 for the Odisha Legislative Assembly

Constituency details
- Country: India
- Region: East India
- State: Odisha
- Division: Central Division
- District: Balasore
- Lok Sabha constituency: Balasore
- Established: 2009
- Total electors: 2,29,033 (Note: as on 2024) (Note: as data published by election commission)
- Reservation: SC

Member of Legislative Assembly
- 17th Odisha Legislative Assembly
- Incumbent Gobinda Chandra Das
- Party: Bharatiya Janata Party
- Elected year: 2024

Remuna is a Vidhan Sabha constituency of Balasore district, Odisha.

The area of this constituency includes Remuna block and 9 GPs (Ransahi, Gudu, Padmapur, Saragan, Genguti, Sasanga, Rasalpur, Jayadevkasba and Hidigan) of Balasore block.

The constituency was formed in the 2008 Delimitation and went for polls in 2009 election.

== Elected members ==
Vote share of winning candidates
2014	51.39%
2019	47.50%
2014	47.63%
2009	47.52%

Since its formation in 2009, 4 elections were held till date.

List of members elected from Remuna constituency are:

Year	Member	Party
2024	Gobinda Chandra Das	Bharatiya Janata Party
2019	Sudhanshu Shekhar Parida	Biju Janata Dal
2014	Gobinda Chandra Das	Bharatiya Janata Party
2009	Sudarshan Jena	Biju Janata Dal

== Election results ==
=== 2024 ===
Voting were held on 1 June 2024 in 4th phase of Odisha Assembly Election & 7th phase of Indian General Election. Counting of votes was on 4 June 2024. In 2024 election, Bharatiya Janata Party candidate Gobinda Chandra Das defeated Biju Janata Dal candidate Bidya Smita Mahalik by a margin of 13,829 votes.

2024 Odisha Vidhan Sabha Election, Remuna
Party	Candidate	Votes	%	±%
BJP	Gobinda Chandra Das	92,620	51.39	▲6.19
BJD	Bidya Smita Mahalik	68,452	37.98	▼9.52
INC	Sudarshan Jena	12,059	6.69	▲1.01
NOTA	None of the above	1,260	0.70	▲0.07
Majority		24,168	13.41	
Turnout		1,80,238	78.7	
BJP gain from BJD				

=== 2019 ===
In 2019 election, Biju Janata Dal candidate Sudhanshu Shekhar Parida defeated Bharatiya Janata Party candidate Gobinda Chandra Das by a margin of 4,118 votes.

2019 Odisha Legislative Assembly election: Remuna
Party	Candidate	Votes	%	±%
BJD	Sudhanshu Shekhar Parida	79,097	47.50	▲9.15
BJP	Gobinda Chandra Das	74,979	45.02	▼2.61
INC	Pratap Kumar Sethi	9,454	5.68	▼3.52
NOTA	None of the above	1,043	0.63	
Majority		4,118	2.48	
Turnout		1,66,536	74.35	
BJD gain from BJP				

=== 2014 ===
In 2014 election, Bharatiya Janata Party candidate Gobinda Chandra Das defeated Biju Janata Dal candidate Sudarshan Jena by a margin of 13,829 votes.

2014 Vidhan Sabha Election, Remuna
Party	Candidate	Votes	%	±%
BJP	Gobinda Chandra Das	70,973	47.63	▲35.25
BJD	Sudarshan Jena	57,144	38.35	▼9.17
INC	Pratyush Ranjan Jena	13,716	9.2	▼1.83
NOTA	None of the above	1,209	0.81	−
Majority		13,829	9.28	−
Turnout		1,49,022	76.99	−
Registered electors		1,93,550		
BJP gain from BJD				

=== 2009 ===
In 2009 election, Biju Janata Dal candidate Sudarshan Jena defeated Independent candidate Gobinda Chandra Das by a margin of 30,723 votes.

2009 Vidhan Sabha Election, Remuna
Party	Candidate	Votes	%	±%
BJD	Sudarshan Jena	55,847	47.52	−
Independent	Gobinda Chandra Das	25,124	6.07	−
BJP	Giridhari Das	14,553	12.38	−
INC	Tarun Kumar Das	12,967	11.03	−
Majority		30,723	26.14 (Note: % of total valid votes)	−
Turnout		1,17,568	66.83	−
BJD win (new seat)				
