= List of constituencies of the Odisha Legislative Assembly =

Odisha Legislative Assembly ଓଡ଼ିଶା ବିଧାନ ସଭା Oḍishā Bidhāna Sabhā
- 17th Odisha Legislative Assembly
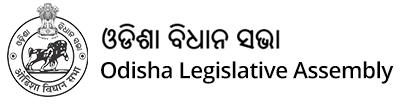

Type
- Type: Unicameral of the Government of Odisha of Odisha
- Term limits: 5 years

History
- Founded: 20 February 1952
- Preceded by: Orissa Provincial Assembly

Structure
- Length of term: 5 years unless dissolved earlier by the Governor following recommendation of the Chief Minister
- Salary: ₹111,000 (US$1,153)

Elections
- Voting system: First-past-the-post voting
- First election: 1952
- Last election: 2024
- Next election: By July 21, 2029
- Redistricting: Delimitation Commission of India

Motto
- ସତ୍ୟମେବ ଜୟତେ

Meeting place
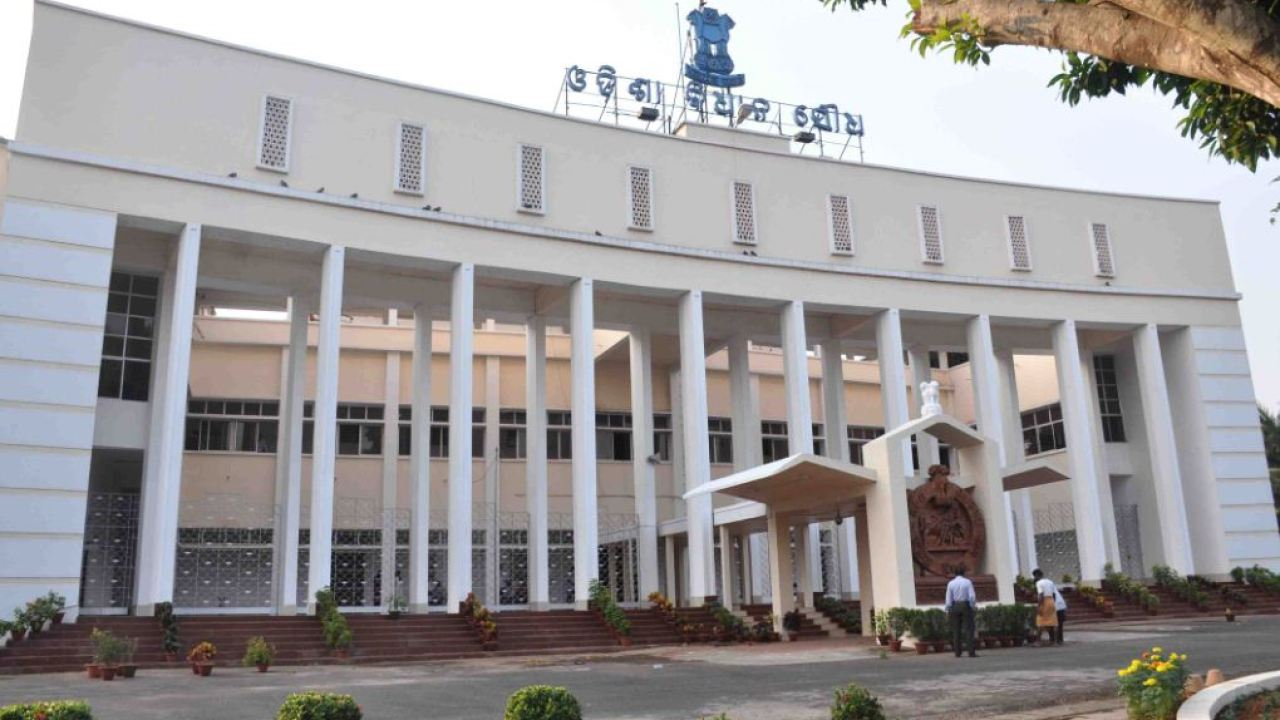
- Odisha Bidhana Soudha, Bhubaneswar, Odisha

Website
- assembly.odisha.gov.in

Constitution
- Constitution of India

Rules
- "Rules of Procedure and Conduct of Business in the Odisha Legislative Assembly, 1965" (PDF). Odisha Legislative Assembly.

The Odisha Legislative Assembly is the unicameral state legislature of Odisha state in India. The seat of the Legislative Assembly is at Bhubaneswar, the capital of the state. It is composed of 147 Members of Legislative Assembly.

== Constituencies ==
Map of assembly constituencies

The following is the list of constituencies of the Odisha Legislative Assembly.

#	Constituency	Reservation	District	Lok Sabha constituency
1	Padampur	None	Bargarh	Bargarh
2	Bijepur	None	Bargarh	Bargarh
3	Bargarh	None	Bargarh	Bargarh
4	Attabira	SC	Bargarh	Bargarh
5	Bhatli	None	Bargarh	Bargarh
6	Brajarajnagar	None	Jharsuguda	Bargarh
7	Jharsuguda	None	Jharsuguda	Bargarh
8	Talsara	ST	Sundargarh	Sundargarh
9	Sundargarh	ST	Sundargarh	Sundargarh
10	Biramitrapur	ST	Sundargarh	Sundargarh
11	Raghunathpali	SC	Sundargarh	Sundargarh
12	Rourkela	None	Sundargarh	Sundargarh
13	Rajgangpur	ST	Sundargarh	Sundargarh
14	Bonai	ST	Sundargarh	Sundargarh
15	Kuchinda	ST	Sambalpur	Sambalpur
16	Rengali	SC	Sambalpur	Sambalpur
17	Sambalpur	None	Sambalpur	Sambalpur
18	Rairakhol	None	Sambalpur	Sambalpur
19	Deogarh	None	Deogarh	Sambalpur
20	Telkoi	ST	Keonjhar	Keonjhar
21	Ghasipura	None	Keonjhar	Keonjhar
22	Anandpur	SC	Keonjhar	Keonjhar
23	Patna	ST	Keonjhar	Keonjhar
24	Keonjhar	ST	Keonjhar	Keonjhar
25	Champua	None	Keonjhar	Keonjhar
26	Jashipur	ST	Mayurbhanj	Mayurbhanj
27	Saraskana	ST	Mayurbhanj	Mayurbhanj
28	Rairangpur	ST	Mayurbhanj	Mayurbhanj
29	Bangriposi	ST	Mayurbhanj	Mayurbhanj
30	Karanjia	ST	Mayurbhanj	Keonjhar
31	Udala	ST	Mayurbhanj	Mayurbhanj
32	Badasahi	SC	Mayurbhanj	Balasore
33	Baripada	ST	Mayurbhanj	Mayurbhanj
34	Morada	None	Mayurbhanj	Mayurbhanj
35	Jaleswar	None	Balasore	Balasore
36	Bhograi	None	Balasore	Balasore
37	Basta	None	Balasore	Balasore
38	Balasore	None	Balasore	Balasore
39	Remuna	SC	Balasore	Balasore
40	Nilgiri	None	Balasore	Balasore
41	Soro	SC	Balasore	Bhadrak
42	Simulia	None	Balasore	Bhadrak
43	Bhandaripokhari	None	Bhadrak	Bhadrak
44	Bhadrak	None	Bhadrak	Bhadrak
45	Basudevpur	None	Bhadrak	Bhadrak
46	Dhamnagar	SC	Bhadrak	Bhadrak
47	Chandabali	None	Bhadrak	Bhadrak
48	Binjharpur	SC	Jajpur	Jajpur
49	Bari	None	Jajpur	Jajpur
50	Barchana	None	Jajpur	Jajpur
51	Dharmasala	None	Jajpur	Jajpur
52	Jajpur	None	Jajpur	Jajpur
53	Korei	None	Jajpur	Jajpur
54	Sukinda	None	Jajpur	Jajpur
55	Dhenkanal	None	Dhenkanal	Dhenkanal
56	Hindol	SC	Dhenkanal	Dhenkanal
57	Kamakshyanagar	None	Dhenkanal	Dhenkanal
58	Parjanga	None	Dhenkanal	Dhenkanal
59	Pallahara	None	Angul	Dhenkanal
60	Talcher	None	Angul	Dhenkanal
61	Angul	None	Angul	Dhenkanal
62	Chhendipada	SC	Angul	Sambalpur
63	Athmallik	None	Angul	Sambalpur
64	Birmaharajpur	SC	Subarnapur	Bolangir
65	Sonepur	None	Subarnapur	Bolangir
66	Loisingha	SC	Balangir	Bolangir
67	Patnagarh	None	Balangir	Bolangir
68	Bolangir	None	Balangir	Bolangir
69	Titlagarh	None	Balangir	Bolangir
70	Kantabanji	None	Balangir	Bolangir
71	Nuapada	None	Nuapada	Kalahandi
72	Khariar	None	Nuapada	Kalahandi
73	Umerkote	ST	Nabarangpur	Nabarangpur
74	Jharigam	ST	Nabarangpur	Nabarangpur
75	Nabarangpur	ST	Nabarangpur	Nabarangpur
76	Dabugam	ST	Nabarangpur	Nabarangpur
77	Lanjigarh	ST	Kalahandi	Kalahandi
78	Junagarh	None	Kalahandi	Kalahandi
79	Dharmagarh	None	Kalahandi	Kalahandi
80	Bhawanipatna	SC	Kalahandi	Kalahandi
81	Narla	None	Kalahandi	Kalahandi
82	Baliguda	ST	Kandhamal	Kandhamal
83	G. Udayagiri	ST	Kandhamal	Kandhamal
84	Phulbani	ST	Kandhamal	Kandhamal
85	Kantamal	None	Boudh	Kandhamal
86	Boudh	None	Boudh	Kandhamal
87	Baramba	None	Cuttack	Cuttack
88	Banki	None	Cuttack	Cuttack
89	Athgarh	None	Cuttack	Cuttack
90	Barabati-Cuttack	None	Cuttack	Cuttack
91	Choudwar-Cuttack	None	Cuttack	Cuttack
92	Niali	SC	Cuttack	Jagatsinghpur
93	Cuttack Sadar	SC	Cuttack	Cuttack
94	Salepur	None	Cuttack	Kendrapara
95	Mahanga	None	Cuttack	Kendrapara
96	Patkura	None	Kendrapara	Kendrapara
97	Kendrapara	SC	Kendrapara	Kendrapara
98	Aul	None	Kendrapara	Kendrapara
99	Rajanagar	None	Kendrapara	Kendrapara
100	Mahakalapada	None	Kendrapara	Kendrapara
101	Paradeep	None	Jagatsinghpur	Jagatsinghpur
102	Tirtol	SC	Jagatsinghpur	Jagatsinghpur
103	Balikuda-Erasama	None	Jagatsinghpur	Jagatsinghpur
104	Jagatsinghpur	None	Jagatsinghpur	Jagatsinghpur
105	Kakatpur	SC	Puri	Jagatsinghpur
106	Nimapara	None	Puri	Jagatsinghpur
107	Puri	None	Puri	Puri
108	Brahmagiri	None	Puri	Puri
109	Satyabadi	None	Puri	Puri
110	Pipili	None	Puri	Puri
111	Jayadev	SC	Khurda	Bhubaneshwar
112	Bhubaneswar Central	None	Khurda	Bhubaneshwar
113	Bhubaneswar North	None	Khurda	Bhubaneshwar
114	Ekamra Bhubaneswar	None	Khurda	Bhubaneshwar
115	Jatani	None	Khurda	Bhubaneshwar
116	Begunia	None	Khurda	Bhubaneshwar
117	Khurda	None	Khurda	Bhubaneshwar
118	Chilika	None	Khurda	Puri
119	Ranpur	None	Nayagarh	Puri
120	Khandapada	None	Nayagarh	Cuttack
121	Daspalla	SC	Nayagarh	Kandhamal
122	Nayagarh	None	Nayagarh	Puri
123	Bhanjanagar	None	Ganjam	Kandhamal
124	Polasara	None	Ganjam	Aska
125	Kabisuryanagar	None	Ganjam	Aska
126	Khalikote	SC	Ganjam	Aska
127	Chhatrapur	SC	Ganjam	Berhampur
128	Aska	None	Ganjam	Aska
129	Surada	None	Ganjam	Aska
130	Sanakhemundi	None	Ganjam	Aska
131	Hinjili	None	Ganjam	Aska
132	Gopalpur	None	Ganjam	Berhampur
133	Berhampur	None	Ganjam	Berhampur
134	Digapahandi	None	Ganjam	Berhampur
135	Chikiti	None	Ganjam	Berhampur
136	Mohana	ST	Gajapati	Berhampur
137	Paralakhemundi	None	Gajapati	Berhampur
138	Gunupur	ST	Rayagada	Koraput
139	Bissam Cuttack	ST	Rayagada	Koraput
140	Rayagada	ST	Rayagada	Koraput
141	Laxmipur	ST	Koraput	Koraput
142	Kotpad	ST	Koraput	Nabarangpur
143	Jeypore	None	Koraput	Koraput
144	Koraput	SC	Koraput	Koraput
145	Pottangi	ST	Koraput	Koraput
146	Malkangiri	ST	Malkangiri	Nabarangpur
147	Chitrakonda	ST	Malkangiri	Nabarangpur

== Former constituencies ==
The following is the list of former constituencies of the Odisha Legislative Assembly.

Constituency	District	Established	Abolished
Bahalda (ST)	Mayurbhanj	1951	2008
Baisinga (ST)	Mayurbhanj	1957	2008
Balipatna (SC)	Khordha	1961	2008
Bamra	Sambalpur	1951	1956
Banpur	Puri	1951	1956
Banpur	Puri	1961	1973
Bhubaneswar	Khordha	1951	2008
Binka	Subarnapur	1951	1956
Binka	Subarnapur	1961	2008
Bisra (ST)	Sundargarh	1951	1973
Cuttack City	Cuttack	1951	2008
Dura (SC)	Ganjam	1957	1973
Ersama	Jagatsinghpur	1951	2008
Gobindpur	Cuttack	1961	2008
Gondia	Dhenkanal	1961	2008
Jaganathprasad (SC)	Ganjam	1951	1956
Jaganathprasad (SC)	Ganjam	1961	2008
Kaptipada (ST)	Mayurbhanj	1951	1956
Kasipur	Kalahandi	1951	1966
Katarbaga	Sambalpur	1957	1966
Kesinga	Kalahandi	1961	2008
Khunta (ST)	Mayurbhanj	1951	1956
Khunta (ST)	Mayurbhanj	1961	2008
Kissannagar	Cuttack	1951	2008
Kodala	Ganjam	1951	2008
Kodinga (ST)	Nabarangpur	1967	2008
Koksara	Kalahandi	1961	2008
Kuliana (ST)	Mayurbhanj	1974	2008
Laikera (ST)	Jharsuguda	1967	2008
Melchhamunda	Bargarh	1971	2008
Nandapur (ST)	Koraput	1951	1956
Nandapur (ST)	Koraput	1967	1973
Narayanpatna	Koraput	1967	1973
Padua	Koraput	1951	1964
Panchpir	Mayurbhanj	1951	1956
Patamundai (SC)	Kendrapara	1951	1956
Patamundai (SC)	Kendrapara	1961	2008
Ramagiri (ST)	Gajapati	1957	2008
Ramchandrapur	Kendujhar	1961	2008
Saintala	Balangir	1961	2008
Tusra	Balangir	1961	1973
