= Chhendipada Assembly constituency =

Assembly constituency in Odisha

Coordinates: 21.08°N 84.87°E

Chhendipada
- Constituency No. 62 for the Odisha Legislative Assembly

Constituency details
- Country: India
- Region: East India
- State: Odisha
- Division: Northern Division
- District: Angul
- Lok Sabha constituency: Sambalpur
- Established: 1961
- Total electors: 2,11,410 (Note: as on 2024) (Note: as data published by election commission)
- Reservation: SC

Member of Legislative Assembly
- 17th Odisha Legislative Assembly
- Incumbent Agasti Behera
- Party: Bharatiya Janata Party
- Elected year: 2024

Chhendipada is a Vidhan Sabha constituency of Angul district, Odisha. This constituency includes Chhendipada block and 12 GPs (Kandasar, Badakerajang, Jarasingha, Kanjara, Karadagadia, Kukudang, Kumand, Kurudol, Sakosingha, Sanakerajang, Tubey and Santrapur) of Banarpal block.

Constituency didn't exist in between 1977 & 2004. It was revived in 2008 Delimitation and went for polls in 2009 election.

== Elected members ==
Since its formation in 1961, 7 elections were held till date.

Elected members from the Chhendipada constituency are:

Year	Member	Party
2024	Agasti Behera	Bharatiya Janata Party
2019	Susanta Kumar Behera	Biju Janata Dal
2014	Susanta Kumar Behera	Biju Janata Dal
2009	Khageswar Behera	Biju Janata Dal
1974-2004 : Constituency did not exist
1971	Bhajaman Behera	Utkal Congress
1967	Nabaghan Nayak	Orissa Jana Congress
1961	Pada Naik	Indian National Congress

== Election results ==
Vote share of winning candidates
2024	52.58%
2019	45.39%
2014	44.83%
2009	45.37%

=== 2024 ===
Voting were held on 25 May 2024 in 3rd phase of Odisha Assembly Election & 6th phase of Indian General Election. Counting of votes was on 4 June 2024. In 2024 election, Bharatiya Janata Party candidate Agasti Behera defeated Biju Janata Dal candidate Susanta Kumar Behera by a margin of votes.

2024 Odisha Vidhan Sabha Election, Chhendipada
Party	Candidate	Votes	%	±%
BJP	Agasti Behera	93,629	52.58	
BJD	Susanta Kumar Behera	78,566	44.12	
INC	Narottam Nayak	3,681	2.07	
NOTA	None of the above	1,370	0.77	
Majority		15,063	8.46	
Turnout		1,78,066	84.23	
BJP gain from BJD				

=== 2019 ===
In 2019 election, Biju Janata Dal candidate Susanta Kumar Behera defeated Bharatiya Janata Party candidate Agasti Behera by a margin of 6,794 votes.

2019 Vidhan Sabha Election, Chhendipada
Party	Candidate	Votes	%	±%
BJD	Susanta Kumar Behera	74,911	45.39	▲0.56
BJP	Agasti Behera	68,117	41.27	▲29.86
INC	Sashmita Behera	16,588	10.05	▼27.69
NOTA	None of the above	1,386	0.84	
Majority		6,794	4.12	
Turnout		1,65,035	79.56	
BJD hold				

=== 2014 ===
In 2014 election, Biju Janata Dal candidate Susanta Kumar Behera defeated Indian National Congress candidate Agasti Behera by a margin of 9,807 votes.

2014 Vidhan Sabha Election, Chhendipada
Party	Candidate	Votes	%	±%
BJD	Susanta Kumar Behera	62,035	44.83	
INC	Agasti Behera	52,228	37.74	
BJP	Santosh Kumar Naik	15,791	11.41	
NOTA	None of the above	1524	1.1	−
Majority		9,807	7.09	3.0
Turnout		1,38,385	74.43	5.0
Registered electors		1,85,931		
BJD hold				

=== 2009 ===
In 2009 election, Biju Janata Dal candidate Khageswar Behera defeated Indian National Congress candidate Agasti Behera by a margin of 4,906 votes.

2009 Vidhan Sabha Election, Chhendipada
Party	Candidate	Votes	%	±%
BJD	Khageswar Behera	70,975	45.37	−
INC	Agasti Behera	49,482	41.27	−
BSP	Gobinda Naik	6,916	5.77	−
BJP	Sanjaya Kumar Naik	6,904	5.76	−
Majority		4,906	4.09 (Note: %of total valid votes)	−
Turnout		1,19,894	69.43	−
BJD win (new seat)				
