= Bhubaneswar North Assembly constituency =

Constituency of the Odisha legislative assembly in India

Coordinates: 20.35°N 85.82°E

Bhubaneswar North (Uttar)
- Constituency No. 113 for the Odisha Legislative Assembly
- Bhubaneswar North Assembly constituency in Khordha district

Constituency details
- Country: India
- Region: East India
- State: Odisha
- Division: Central Division
- District: Khordha
- Lok Sabha constituency: Bhubaneswar
- Established: 2009
- Total electors: 2,85,872 (Note: as on 2024) (Note: as data published by election commission)
- Reservation: None

Member of Legislative Assembly
- 17th Odisha Legislative Assembly
- Incumbent Susant Kumar Rout
- Party: Biju Janata Dal
- Elected year: 2024

Bhubaneswar North (Uttar) is a Vidhan Sabha constituency of Khordha district, Odisha, India.

This constituency includes 5 Gram panchayats (Raghunathpur, Dadha, Kalyanpur, Baramunda and Kalarahanga) of Bhubaneswar block and Ward No. 1 to 11 & 13 of BMC.

The constituency was formed in 2008 Delimitation and went for polls in 2009 election.

== Elected members ==
Vote share of winning candidates
2024	50.63%
2019	54.84%
2014	65.77%
2009	72.05%

Since its formation in 2009, 4 elections were held till date.

List of members elected from Bhubaneswar North (Uttar) constituency are:

Election	Portrait	Name	Party
2024		Susanta Kumar Rout	Biju Janata Dal
2019		Susanta Kumar Rout	Biju Janata Dal
2014		Priyadarshi Mishra	Biju Janata Dal
2009	-	Bhagirathi Badajena	Biju Janata Dal

== Election results ==
=== 2024 ===
Voting were held on 25 May 2024 in 3rd phase of Odisha Assembly Election & 6th phase of Indian General Election. Counting of votes was on 4 June 2024. In 2024 election, Biju Janata Dal candidate Susant Kumar Rout defeated Bharatiya Janata Party candidate Priyadarshi Mishra by a margin of 11,343 votes.

2024 Odisha Vidhan Sabha Election, Bhubaneswar North
Party	Candidate	Votes	%	±%
BJD	Susant Kumar Rout	78,179	50.63	▼4.21
BJP	Priyadarshi Mishra	66,836	43.28	▲8.02
INC	Ashok Kumar Das	5,420	3.51	▼0.49
NOTA	None of the above	868	0.56	▼0.57
Majority		11,343	7.35	
Turnout		1,54,427	54.02	
BJD hold				

=== 2019 ===
In 2019 election, Biju Janata Dal candidate Susant Kumar Rout defeated Bharatiya Janata Party candidate Aparajita Mohanty by a margin of 25,414 votes.

2019 Vidhan Sabha Election, Bhubaneswar North
Party	Candidate	Votes	%	±%
BJD	Susant Kumar Rout	71,193	54.84	▼10.93
BJP	Aparajita Mohanty	45,779	35.26	▲12.98
INC	Itis Pradhan	5,189	4.00	▼3.34
None of the Above	None of the Above	1,467	1.13	
Majority		25,414	19.58	
Turnout		1,29,815	43.56	
BJD hold				

=== 2014 ===
In 2014 election, Biju Janata Dal candidate Priyadarshi Mishra defeated Bharatiya Janata Party candidate Dillip Mohanty by a margin of 48,757 votes.

2014 Vidhan Sabha Election, Bhubaneswar North (Uttar)
Party	Candidate	Votes	%	±%
BJD	Priyadarshi Mishra	73,728	65.77	−
BJP	Dillip Mohanty	24,971	22.28	−
INC	Manoranjan Dash	8,223	7.34	−
NOTA	None of the above	1,151	1.03	−
Majority		48757	43.49	−
Turnout		1,12,121	41.33	−
Registered electors		2,71,208		
BJD hold				

=== 2009 ===
In 2009 election, Biju Janata Dal candidate Bhagirathi Badajena defeated Bharatiya Janata Party candidate Golak Prasad Mahapatra by a margin of 51,462 votes.

2009 Vidhan Sabha Election, Bhubaneswar North
Party	Candidate	Votes	%	±%
BJD	Bhagirathi Badajena	62,278	72.05	−
BJP	Golak Prasad Mahapatra	11,316	12.99	−
INC	Kishore Kumar Jena	10,451	11.99	−
Majority		51,462	59.06 (Note: %of total valid votes)	−
Turnout		87,154	35.09	−
Registered electors		2,48,377		
BJD win (new seat)				
