= Bhadrak Assembly constituency =

Assembly constituency in Odisha

Coordinates: 21.06°N 86.50°E

Bhadrak
- Constituency No. 44 for the Odisha Legislative Assembly

Constituency details
- Country: India
- Region: East India
- State: Odisha
- Division: Central Division
- District: Bhadrak
- Lok Sabha constituency: Bhadrak
- Established: 1951
- Total electors: 2,74,332 (Note: as on 2024) (Note: as data published by election commission)
- Reservation: None

Member of Legislative Assembly
- 17th Odisha Legislative Assembly
- Incumbent Sitansu Sekhar Mohapatra
- Party: Bharatiya Janata Party
- Elected year: 2024

Bhadrak (Sl. No.: 44) is a Vidhan Sabha constituency of Bhadrak district, Odisha.

The constituency includes Bhadrak and Bhadrak block.

== Elected members ==
Vote share of winning candidates
2024	42.29%
2019	52.07%
2014	49.86%
2009	53.99%
2004	50.57%
2002 (bypoll)	50.3%
2000	49.42%
1995	44.35%
1990	56.62%
1985	48.34%
1980	53.85%
1977	56.36%

Since its formation in 1951, 19 elections were held till date including two bypolls in 1971 & 2001.

List of members elected from Bhadrak constituency are:

Election	Member	Party
1951	Mahamad Hanif	Indian National Congress
1957	Nityananda Mohapatra	Independent politician
1961	Nityananda Mohapatra	Independent politician
1967	Nityananda Mohapatra	Orissa Jana Congress
1971	Harekrushna Mahatab	Indian National Congress
1971 (bypoll) (Note: Resignation of Harekrushna Mahatab)	Balaram Sahoo	Utkal Congress
1974	Jugal Kishore Pattnaik	Indian National Congress
1977	Ratnakar Mohanty	Janata Party
1980	Jugal Kishore Pattnaik	Indian National Congress (I)
1985	Jugal Kishore Pattnaik	Indian National Congress
1990	Prafulla Samal	Janata Dal
1995	Prafulla Samal	Janata Dal
2000	Biren Palei	Indian National Congress
2002 (bypoll) (Note: Death of Biren Palei)	Prafulla Samal	Biju Janata Dal
2004	Naren Pallai	Indian National Congress
2009	Jugal Kishore Pattnaik	Biju Janata Dal
2014	Jugal Kishore Pattnaik	Biju Janata Dal
2019	Sanjib Kumar Mallick	Biju Janata Dal
2024	Sitansu Sekhar Mohapatra	Bharatiya Janata Party

== Election results ==
=== 2024 ===
Voting were held on 1 June 2024 in 4th phase of Odisha Assembly Election & 7th phase of Indian General Election. Counting of votes was on 4 June 2024. In 2024 election, Bharatiya Janata Party candidate Sitansu Sekhar Mohapatra defeated Biju Janata Dal candidate Prafulla Samal by a margin of 16,068 votes.

2024 Odisha Vidhan Sabha Election, Bhadrak
Party	Candidate	Votes	%	±%
BJP	Sitansu Sekhar Mohapatra	82,282	42.29	
BJD	Prafulla Samal	66,214	34.03	
INC	Asit Patnaik	43,557	22.38	
NOTA	None of the above	779	0.4	
Majority		16,068	8.26	
Turnout		1,94,582	70.93	
BJP gain from BJD				

=== 2019 ===
In 2019 election, Biju Janata Dal candidate Sanjib Kumar Mallick defeated Bharatiya Janata Party candidate Pradip Nayak by a margin of 33,389 votes.

2019 Odisha Legislative Assembly election: Bhadrak
Party	Candidate	Votes	%	±%
BJD	Sanjib Kumar Mallick	93.668	52.07	
BJP	Pradip Nayak	60,279	33.51	
INC	Nalini Kanta Mohanty	22,630	12.58	
NOTA	None of the above	843	0.47	
Majority		33,389	18.56	
Turnout		1,79,895	70.81	
Registered electors		254,061		
BJD hold				

=== 2014 ===
In 2014 election, Biju Janata Dal candidate Jugal Kishore Pattnaik defeated Indian National Congress candidate Naren Pallai by a margin of 23,587 votes.

2014 Vidhan Sabha Election, Bhadrak
Party	Candidate	Votes	%	±%
BJD	Jugal Kishore Pattnaik	80,582	49.86	▼4.13
INC	Naren Pallai	56,995	35.27	▼3.36
BJP	Pradip Nayak	19,384	11.99	▲6.43
NOTA	None of the above	832	0.51	
Majority		23,587	14.59	
Turnout		1,61,616	71.49	6.37
Registered electors		2,26,077		
BJD hold				

=== 2009 ===
In 2009 election, Biju Janata Dal candidate Jugal Kishore Pattnaik defeated Indian National Congress candidate Naren Pallai by a margin of 21,428 votes.

2009 Vidhan Sabha Election, Bhadrak
Party	Candidate	Votes	%	±%
BJD	Jugal Kishore Pattnaik	75,294	53.99	−
INC	Naren Pallai	53,866	38.63	−
BJP	Tusar Kanti Jena	7,755	5.56	−
Majority		21,428	15.37 (Note: %of total valid votes)	−
Turnout		1,39,448	65.12	−
BJD gain from INC				
