= Bhandaripokhari Assembly constituency =

Assembly constituency in Odisha

Coordinates: 20.96°N 86.37°E

Bhandaripokhari
- Constituency No. 43 for the Odisha Legislative Assembly

Constituency details
- Country: India
- Region: East India
- State: Odisha
- Division: Central Division
- District: Bhadrak
- Lok Sabha constituency: Bhadrak
- Established: 1952
- Total electors: 2,40,416 (Note: as on 2024) (Note: as data published by election commission)
- Reservation: None

Member of Legislative Assembly
- 17th Odisha Legislative Assembly
- Incumbent Sanjib Kumar Mallick
- Party: Biju Janata Dal
- Elected year: 2024

Bhandaripokhari is a Vidhan Sabha constituency of Bhadrak district, Odisha.

Area of this constituency includes Bhandaripokhari block and Bonth block.

== Elected members ==
Vote share of winning candidates
2024	39.07%
2019	40.49%
2014	45.27%
2009	44.37%
2004	49.33%
2000	58.16%
1998 (bypoll)	53.51%
1995	44.2%
1991 (bypoll)	46.79%
1990	72.25%
1985	42.41%
1980	54.22%
1977	56.08%

Since its formation in 1952, 15 elections were held till date including two bypolls in 1991 & 1998. In 1952, it was known as Banth constituency. It was disestablished in 1956 and revived as Bhandaripokhari in 1974.

List of members elected from Bhandaripokhari constituency are:

Year	Member	Party
As Banth constituency
1952	Gokulananda Mohanty	Indian National Congress
1957-1974 : Constituency did not exist
1974	Bairagi Jena	Utkal Congress
1977	Kapil Charan Sethi	Janata Party
1980	Purusottam Sethi	Indian National Congress (I)
1985	Panchanan Mandal	Indian National Congress
1990	Arjun Charan Sethi	Janata Dal
1991 (bypoll) (Note: Resignation of Arjun Charan Sethi on his election to Lok Sabha)	Prafulla Kumar Jena	Janata Dal
1995	Arjun Charan Sethi	Janata Dal
1998 (bypoll) (Note: Resignation of Arjun Charan Sethi on his election to Lok Sabha)	Kumar Shree Chiranjibi	Indian National Congress
2000	Ratha Das	Biju Janata Dal
2004	Ananta Sethi	Indian National Congress
2009	Prafulla Samal	Biju Janata Dal
2014	Prafulla Samal	Biju Janata Dal
2019	Prafulla Samal	Biju Janata Dal
2024	Sanjib Kumar Mallick	Biju Janata Dal

== Election results ==
=== 2024 ===
Voting were held on 1 June 2024 in 4th phase of Odisha Assembly Election & 7th phase of Indian General Election. Counting of votes was on 4 June 2024. In 2024 election, Biju Janata Dal candidate Sanjib Kumar Mallick defeated Indian National Congress candidate Niranjan Patnaik by a margin of 1,551 votes.

2024 Odisha Vidhan Sabha Election, Bhandaripokhari
Party	Candidate	Votes	%	±%
BJD	Sanjib Kumar Mallick	72,447	39.07	▼6.20
INC	Niranjan Patnaik	70,896	38.23	▲14.95
BJP	Sudhanshu Shekhar Nayak	38,952	21.01	▲2.42
NOTA	None of the above	357	0.19	▼0.19
Majority		1,551	0.84	
Turnout		1,85,437	77.13	
BJD hold				

=== 2019 ===
In 2019 election, Biju Janata Dal candidate Prafulla Samal defeated Indian National Congress candidate Niranjan Patnaik by a margin of 8,859 votes.

2019 Odisha Vidhan Sabha Election, Bhandaripokhari
Party	Candidate	Votes	%	±%
BJD	Prafulla Samal	70,180	40.49	
INC	Niranjan Patnaik	61,321	35.38	
BJP	Badri Narayan Dhal	39,141	22.58	
NOTA	None of the above	585	0.38	
Majority		8,859	5.11	
Turnout		1,54,995	76.64	
BJD hold				

=== 2014 ===
In 2014 election, Biju Janata Dal candidate Prafulla Samal defeated Indian National Congress candidate Subrat Kumar Das by a margin of 34,097 votes.

2014 Odisha Legislative Assembly election: Bhandaripokhari
Party	Candidate	Votes	%	±%
BJD	Prafulla Samal	70,173	45.27	0.9
INC	Subrat Kumar Das	36,076	23.28	6.06
BJP	Badri Narayan Dhal	28,809	18.59	3.01
NOTA	None of the above	585	0.38	−
Majority		34,097	21.99	6.96
Turnout		1,54,995	77.26	4.15
Registered electors		2,00,606		
BJD hold				

=== 2009 ===
In 2009 election, Biju Janata Dal candidate Prafulla Samal defeated Indian National Congress candidate Badri Narayan Dhal by a margin of 20,410 votes.

2009 Vidhan Sabha Election, Bhandaripokhari
Party	Candidate	Votes	%	±%
BJD	Prafulla Samal	60,250	44.37	−
INC	Badri Narayan Dhal	39,840	29.34	−
BJP	Manmohan Samal	21,160	15.58	−
Majority		20,410	15.03 (Note: %of total valid votes)	−
Turnout		1,35,799	73.11	−
BJD gain from INC				
