= Parjanga Assembly constituency =

Constituency of the Odisha legislative assembly in India

Coordinates: 20.92°N 85.32°E

Parjanga
- Constituency No. 58 for the Odisha Legislative Assembly

Constituency details
- Country: India
- Region: East India
- State: Odisha
- Division: Northern Division
- District: Dhenkanal
- Lok Sabha constituency: Dhenkanal
- Established: 2009
- Total electors: 2,19,662 (Note: as on 2024) (Note: as data published by election commission)
- Reservation: None

Member of Legislative Assembly
- 17th Odisha Legislative Assembly
- Incumbent Bibhuti Bhusan Pradhan
- Party: Bharatiya Janata Party
- Elected year: 2024

Parjanga is a Vidhan Sabha constituency of Dhenkanal district, Odisha, India.

The area of this constituency includes Parjang block, Kankadahada block and five gram panchayats (GPs; Kusumajodi, Kantapal, Tumusinga, Kantiokateni and Kantioputasahi) of Kamakshyanagar block.

The constituency was formed in the 2008 Delimitation and went for polls in the 2009 election.

== Elected members ==
Vote share of winning candidates
2024	56.94%
2019	46.93%
2014	40.06%
2009	44.84%

Since its formation in 2009, four elections were held till date.

The list of members elected from Parjanga constituency is:

Year	Member	Party
2024	Bibhuti Bhusan Pradhan	Bharatiya Janata Party
2019	Nrusingha Charan Sahu	Biju Janata Dal
2014	Nrusingha Charan Sahu	Biju Janata Dal
2009	Nrusingha Charan Sahu	Biju Janata Dal

== Election results ==
=== 2024 ===
Voting were held on 25 May 2024 in 3rd phase of Odisha Assembly Election & 6th phase of Indian General Election. Counting of votes was on 4 June 2024. In the 2024 election, Bharatiya Janata Party candidate Bibhuti Bhusan Pradhan defeated Biju Janata Dal candidate Nrushingha Charan Sahu by a margin of 32,162 votes.

2024 Odisha Vidhan Sabha Election, Parjanga
Party	Candidate	Votes	%	±%
BJP	Bibhuti Bhusan Pradhan	1,00,595	56.94	
BJD	Nrusingha Charan Sahu	68,433	38.74	
INC	Ranjit Kumar Sahu	3,482	1.97	
NOTA	None of the above	1,512	0.86	
Majority		32,162	18.2	
Turnout		1,76,669	80.43	
BJP gain from BJD				

=== 2019 ===
In the 2019 election, Biju Janata Dal candidate Nrushingha Charan Sahu defeated Bharatiya Janata Party candidate Bibhuti Bhusan Pradhan by a margin of 740 votes.

2019 Vidhan Sabha Election, Parjanga
Party	Candidate	Votes	%	±%
BJD	Nrusingha Charan Sahu	78,747	46.93	
BJP	Bibhuti Bhusan Pradhan	78,007	46.49	
INC	Jasaswini Rout	6,795	4.05	
NOTA	None of the above	1,518	0.90	
Majority		740	0.44	
Turnout		167,802	78.5	
BJD hold				

=== 2014 ===
In the 2014 election, Biju Janata Dal candidate Nrusingha Charan Sahu defeated Bharatiya Janata Party candidate Bibhuti Bhusan Pradhan by a margin of 3,052 votes.

2014 Vidhan Sabha Election, Parjanga
Party	Candidate	Votes	%	±%
BJD	Nrusingha Charan Sahu	60,523	40.06	▲1.33
BJP	Bibhuti Bhusan Pradhan	57,471	38.04	▲3.48
INC	Santosh Kumar Rout	18,240	12.07	▼4.87
NOTA	None of the above	2,209	1.46	−
Majority		3,052	2.02	▼2.15
Turnout		151,084	80.04	▲10.96
Registered electors		188,759		
BJD hold				

=== 2009 ===
In the 2009 election, Biju Janata Dal candidate Nrusingha Charan Sahu defeated Bharatiya Janata Party candidate Bibhuti Bhusan Pradhan by a margin of 5,188 votes.

2009 Vidhan Sabha Election: Parjanga
Party	Candidate	Votes	%	±%
BJD	Nrusingha Charan Sahu	48,131	38.73	−
BJP	Bibhuti Bhusan Pradhan	42,943	34.56	−
INC	Laxmidhar Sahoo	21,048	16.94	−
Majority		5,188	4.17 (Note: % of total valid votes)	−
Turnout		1,24,277	69.08	−
BJD win (new seat)				
