= Niali Assembly constituency =

Constituency of the Odisha legislative assembly in India

Coordinates: 20.14°N 86.06°E

Niali
- Constituency No. 92 for the Odisha Legislative Assembly

Constituency details
- Country: India
- Region: East India
- State: Odisha
- Division: Central Division
- District: Cuttack
- Lok Sabha constituency: Jagatsinghpur
- Established: 2009
- Total electors: 2,48,941 (Note: as on 2024) (Note: as data published by election commission)
- Reservation: SC

Member of Legislative Assembly
- 17th Odisha Legislative Assembly
- Incumbent Chhabi Malik
- Party: Bharatiya Janata Party
- Elected year: 2024

Niali is a Vidhan Sabha constituency of Cuttack district, Odisha, India.

This constituency includes Niali block, Kantapada block and eight gram panchayats (Nagari, Usuma, Khalarda, Korkora, Sainso, Kurangpradhan, Kurangsasan and Harianta) of Barang block.

The constituency was formed in the 2008 Delimitation and went for polls in 2009 election.

== Elected members ==
Vote share of winning candidates
2024	47.71%
2019	53.65%
2014	53.27%
2009	65.45%

Since its formation in 2009, four elections have been held.

The list of members elected from Niali constituency is:

Year	Member	Party
2024	Chhabi Malik	Bharatiya Janata Party
2019	Pramod Kumar Mallick	Biju Janata Dal
2014	Pramod Kumar Mallick	Biju Janata Dal
2009	Pramod Kumar Mallick	Biju Janata Dal

== Election results ==
=== 2024 ===
An election was held on 1 June 2024 in the 4th phase of the Odisha Assembly election and the 7th phase of the Indian general election. The counting of votes was on 4 June 2024. In 2024 election, Bharatiya Janata Party candidate Chhabi Malik defeated Biju Janata Dal candidate Pramod Kumar Mallick by a margin of 1,452 votes.

2024 Odisha Vidhan Sabha election, Niali
Party	Candidate	Votes	%	±%
BJP	Chhabi Malik	90,191	47.71	
BJD	Pramod Kumar Mallick	88,739	46.95	
INC	Jyoti Ranjan Mallick	7,701	4.07	
NOTA	None of the above	633	0.33	
Majority		1,452	0.66	
Turnout		1,89,024	75.93	
BJP gain from BJD				

=== 2019 ===
In 2019 election, Biju Janata Dal candidate Pramod Kumar Mallick defeated Bharatiya Janata Party candidate Chhabi Malik by a margin of 27,703 votes.

2019 Odisha Vidhan Sabha election, Niali
Party	Candidate	Votes	%	±%
BJD	Pramod Kumar Mallick	94,013	53.65	
BJP	Chhabi Malik	66,310	37.84	
INC	Mamata Bhoi	12,659	7.22	
NOTA	None of the above	698	0.4	
Majority		27,703	15.81	
Turnout		1,75,224	72.42	
BJD hold				

=== 2014 ===
In 2014 election, Biju Janata Dal candidate Pramod Kumar Mallick defeated Indian National Congress candidate Chhabi Malik by a margin of 25,809 votes.

2014 Vidhan Sabha election, Niali
Party	Candidate	Votes	%	±%
BJD	Pramod Kumar Mallick	88,119	53.27	
INC	Chhabi Malik	62,310	37.67	
BJP	Sushanta Kumar Mallick	11,831	7.15	
NOTA	None of the above	1,073	0.65	
Majority		25,809	15.60	
Turnout		1,65,406	75.5	
BJD hold				

=== 2009 ===
In 2009 election, Biju Janata Dal candidate Pramod Kumar Mallick defeated Indian National Congress candidate Artratrana Malik by a margin of 50,653 votes.

2009 Vidhan Sabha election, Niali
Party	Candidate	Votes	%	±%
BJD	Pramod Kumar Mallick	90,058	65.45	−
INC	Artratrana Malik	40,005	28.88	−
BJP	Sushanta Kumar Mallick	4,921	3.55	−
Majority		50,653	36.57 (Note: % of total valid votes)	−
Turnout		1,38,534	64.56	−
Registered electors		2,14,580		
BJD win (new seat)				
