= Kantamal Assembly constituency =

Constituency of the Odisha legislative assembly in India

Coordinates: 20.66°N 83.74°E

Kantamal
- Constituency No. 85 for the Odisha Legislative Assembly

Constituency details
- Country: India
- Region: East India
- State: Odisha
- Division: Southern Division
- District: Boudh
- Lok Sabha constituency: Kandhamal
- Established: 2009
- Total electors: 1,69,070 (Note: as on 2024) (Note: as data published by election commission)
- Reservation: None

Member of Legislative Assembly
- 17th Odisha Legislative Assembly
- Incumbent Kanhai Charan Danga
- Party: Bharatiya Janta Party
- Elected year: 2024

Kantamal is a Vidhan Sabha constituency of Boudh district, Odisha.

This constituency includes Kantamal block and 10 GPs (Raxa, Manupali, Gochhapada, Baunsuni, Bohira, Talasarada, Mundipadar, Sagada, Gundulia and Ainlapali) of Boudh block.

The constituency was formed in 2008 Delimitation and went for polls in 2009 election.

== Elected members ==
Vote share of winning candidates
2024	48.28%
2019	33.03%
2014	42.62%
2009	44.68%

Since its formation in 2009, 4 elections were held till date

List of members elected from the Kantamal constituency are:

Year	Member	Party
2024	Kanhai Charan Danga	BJP
2019	Mahidhar Rana	BJD
2014	Mahidhar Rana	BJD
2009	Bhagaban Kanhar	BJD

== Election results ==
=== 2024 ===
Voting were held on 20 May 2024 in 2nd phase of Odisha Assembly Election & 5th phase of Indian General Election. Counting of votes was on 4 June 2024. In 2024 election, Bharatiya Janata Party candidate Kanhai Charan Danga defeated Biju Janata Dal candidate Mahidhar Rana by a margin of 7,149 votes.

2024 Odisha Vidhan Sabha Election, Kantamal
Party	Candidate	Votes	%	±%
BJP	Kanhai Charan Danga	68,356	48.28	
BJD	Mahidhar Rana	61,207	43.23	
INC	Saroj Kumar Pradhan	7,694	5.43	
NOTA	None of the above	1,399	0.99	
Majority		7,149	5.05	
Turnout		1,41,575	83,74	
BJP gain from BJD				

=== 2019 ===
In 2019 election, Biju Janata Dal candidate Mahidhar Rana defeated Bharatiya Janata Party candidate Kanhai Charan Danga by a margin of 3,650 votes.

2019 Vidhan Sabha Election, Kantamal
Party	Candidate	Votes	%	±%
BJD	Mahidhar Rana	43,099	33.03	
BJP	Kanhai Charan Danga	39,449	30.24	
Independent	Sesha Kumar Meher	28,370	21.75	
INC	Prasanta Kumar Sahu	13,166	21.75	
NOTA	None of the above	1,091	0.84	
Majority		3,650	2.79	
Turnout		1,30,465	79.76	
BJD hold				

=== 2014 ===
In 2014 election, Biju Janata Dal candidate Mahidhar Rana defeated Indian National Congress candidate Harinarayan Pradhan by a margin of 25,366 votes.

2014 Vidhan Sabha Election, Kantamal
Party	Candidate	Votes	%	±%
BJD	Mahidhar Rana	49,202	42.62	▼2.06
INC	Harinarayan Pradhan	23,836	20.65	▼9.99
Independent	Kanhai Charan Danga	23,688	20.52	−
BJP	Sudhansu Danga	9,336	8.09	▼11.78
NOTA	None of the above	1,132	0.98	−
Majority		25,366	21.97	▲7.92
Turnout		1,15,436	80.71	▲6.84
Registered electors		1,43,026		
BJD hold				

=== 2009 ===
In 2009 election, Biju Janata Dal candidate Bhagaban Kanhor defeated Indian National Congress candidate Kanhai Charan Danga by a margin of 14,453 votes.

2009 Vidhan Sabha Election, Kantamal
Party	Candidate	Votes	%	±%
BJD	Bhagaban Kanhor	45,979	44.68	−
INC	Kanhai Charan Danga	31,526	30.64	−
BJP	Harinarayan Pradhan	20,448	19.87	−
Majority		14,453	14.05 (Note: % of total valid votes)	−
Turnout		1,02,929	73.87	−
BJD win (new seat)				
