= Durga Prasan Nayak =

Indian politician

Member of Odisha Legislative Assembly
- Incumbent
- Assumed office 4 June 2024
- Preceded by: Atanu Sabyasachi Nayak
- Constituency: Mahakalapada

Personal details
- Party: Bharatiya Janata Party
- Profession: Politician

Durga Prasan Nayak is an Indian politician who was elected to the Odisha Legislative Assembly from Mahakalapada as a member of the Bharatiya Janata Party.
