= Mahakalapada Assembly constituency =

Constituency of the Odisha legislative assembly in India

Coordinates: 20.42°N 86.60°E

Mahakalapada
- Constituency No. 100 for the Odisha Legislative Assembly
- Mahakalapada Assembly constituency in Kendrapara district

Constituency details
- Country: India
- Region: East India
- State: Odisha
- Division: Central Division
- District: Kendrapara
- Lok Sabha constituency: Kendrapara
- Established: 2009
- Total electors: 2,53,626 (Note: as on 2024) (Note: as data published by election commission)
- Reservation: None

Member of Legislative Assembly
- 17th Odisha Legislative Assembly
- Incumbent Durga Prasan Nayak
- Party: Bharatiya Janata Party
- Elected year: 2024

Mahakalapada (Sl. No.: 100) is an unreserved Vidhan Sabha constituency of Kendrapara district, Odisha.

This constituency includes Mahakalapada block and 17 Gram panchayats (Silipur, Dasipur, Dumuka, Marshaghai, Garajanga, Talasanga, Parakula, Akhuadakhin, Raghabapur, Antei, Batira, Beruhan, Manikunda, Angulai, Tikarpanga, Kuhudi and Mangarajpur) of Marsaghai block.

The constituency was formed in 2008 Delimitation and went for polls in 2009 election.

== Elected members ==
Vote share of winning candidates
2024	57.23%
2019	51.29%
2014	47.62%
2009	48.69%

Since its formation in 2009, 4 elections were held till date.

List of members elected from Mahakalapada constituency is :-

Election	Name	Party
2024	Durga Prasan Nayak	Bharatiya Janata Party
2019	Atanu Sabyasachi Nayak	Biju Janata Dal
2014	Atanu Sabyasachi Nayak	Biju Janata Dal
2009	Atanu Sabyasachi Nayak	Biju Janata Dal

== Election results ==
=== 2024 ===
Voting were held on 1st June 2024 in 4th phase of Odisha Assembly Election & 7th phase of Indian General Election. Counting of votes was on 4th June 2024. In 2024 election, Bharatiya Janata Party candidate Durga Prasan Nayak defeated Biju Janata Dal candidate Atanu Sabyasachi Nayak by a margin of 33,526 votes.

2024 Odisha Vidhan Sabha Election, Mahakalapada
Party	Candidate	Votes	%	±%
BJP	Durga Prasan Nayak	109,653	57.23	
BJD	Atanu Sabyasachi Nayak	76,127	39.73	
INC	Lokanath Moharathy	3,042	1.59	
NOTA	None of the above	578	0.3	
Majority		33,526	17.5	
Turnout		1,91,611	75.55	
gain from BJD				

=== 2019 ===
In 2019 election, Biju Janata Dal candidate Atanu Sabyasachi Nayak defeated Bharatiya Janata Party candidate Bijay Pradhan by a margin of 15,663 votes.

2019 Odisha Vidhan Sabha Election, Mahakalapada
Party	Candidate	Votes	%	±%
BJD	Atanu Sabyasachi Nayak	93,197	51.29	▲3.67
BJP	Bijay Pradhan	77534	42.67	▲7.64
INC	Bibhransu Sekhar Lenka	8318	4.58	▼11.28
NOTA	None of the above	531	0.31	−
Majority		15,663	8.62	−
Turnout		1,81,714	76.1	−
Registered electors		2,33,724		
BJD hold				

=== 2014 ===
In 2014 election, Biju Janata Dal candidate Atanu Sabyasachi Nayak defeated Bharatiya Janata Party candidate Bijoy Mohapatra by a margin of 23,246 votes.

2014 Odisha Vidhan Sabha Election, Mahakalapada
Party	Candidate	Votes	%	±%
BJD	Atanu Sabyasachi Nayak	81,050	47.62	−
BJP	Bijoy Mohapatra	57,804	33.96	−
INC	Balaram Parida	27,001	15.86	−
Majority		23,246	13.66	−
Turnout		1,70,193	77.94	
Registered electors		2,14,942		
BJD hold				

=== 2009 ===
In 2009 election, Biju Janata Dal candidate Atanu Sabyasachi Nayak defeated Indian National Congress candidate Balaram Parida by a margin of 19,595 votes.

2009 Odisha Vidhan Sabha Election, Mahakalapada
Party	Candidate	Votes	%	±%
BJD	Atanu Sabyasachi Nayak	70,433	48.69	−
INC	Balaram Parida	50,838	35.14	−
BJP	Gandharb Chandra Nayak	18,633	12.88	−
Majority		19,595	13.55	−
Turnout		1,44,673	72.92	−
Registered electors		1,98,390		
BJD win (new seat)				
