= Lanjigarh Assembly constituency =

Constituency of the Odisha legislative assembly in India

Coordinates: 19.71°N 83.37°E

Lanjigarh
- Constituency No. 77 for the Odisha Legislative Assembly

Constituency details
- Country: India
- Region: East India
- State: Odisha
- Division: Southern Division
- District: Kalahandi
- Lok Sabha constituency: Kalahandi
- Established: 2009
- Total electors: 2,30,367 (Note: as on 2024) (Note: as data published by election commission)
- Reservation: ST

Member of Legislative Assembly
- 17th Odisha Legislative Assembly
- Incumbent Pradip Kumar Dishari
- Party: Biju Janata Dal
- Elected year: 2024

Lanjigarh is a Vidhan Sabha constituency of Kalahandi district, Odisha.

This constituency includes Lanjigarh block, Thuamul Rampur block and 16 Gram panchayats (Anlabhata, Badakarlakot, Badpujhariaguda, Baner, Bhainripali, Dhansuli, Hirapur, Jaipatna, Kuchagaon, Mangalpur, Mukhiguda, Paikkendumundi, Pratappur, Rengalpalli, Sargiguda and Uchhula) of Jaipatna block and 8 GPs (Risigaon, Duarsuni, Sagada, Jugsaipatna, Chancher, Kuturukhamar, Malgaon and Tal Belgaon) of Bhawanipatna block.

The constituency was formed in 2008 Delimitation and went for polls in 2009 election.

== Elected members ==
Vote share of winning candidates
2024	34.09%
2019	38.28%
2014	43.47%
2009	34.47%

Since its formation in 2009, 4 elections were held till date.

List of members elected from Lanjigarh constituency are:

Year	Member	Party
2024	Pradip Kumar Dishari	Biju Janata Dal
2019	Pradip Kumar Dishari	Biju Janata Dal
2014	Balabhadra Majhi	Biju Janata Dal
2009	Shibaji Majhi	Indian National Congress

== Election results ==
=== 2024 ===
Voting were held on 13 May 2024 in 1st phase of Odisha Assembly Election & 4th phase of Indian General Election. Counting of votes was on 4 June 2024. In 2024 election, Biju Janata Dal candidate Pradip Kumar Dishari defeated Indian National Congress candidate Balabhadra Majhi by a margin of 6,501 votes.

2024 Vidhan Sabha Election, Lanjigarh
Party	Candidate	Votes	%	±%
BJD	Pradip Kumar Dishari	60,254	34.09	▼4.19
INC	Balabhadra Majhi	53,753	30.41	▲0.91
BJP	Ramesh Chandra Majhi	49,113	27.78	▲3.39
NOTA	None of the above	4,123	2.33	▲0.38
Majority		6,501	3.68	▼5.10
Turnout		1,76,768	76.73	
BJD hold				

=== 2019 ===
In 2019 election, Biju Janata Dal candidate Pradip Kumar Dishari defeated Indian National Congress candidate Sibaji Majhi by a margin of 14,308 votes.

2019 Vidhan Sabha Election, Lanjigarh
Party	Candidate	Votes	%	±%
BJD	Pradip Kumar Dishari	62,413	38.28	▼5.19
INC	Sibaji Majhi	48,105	29.50	▲2.67
BJP	Ramesh Chandra Majhi	39,777	24.39	▲6.51
NOTA	None of the above	3,181	1.95	
Majority		14,308	8.78	
Turnout		1,63.064	75.57	
BJD hold				

=== 2014 ===
In 2014 election, Biju Janata Dal candidate Balabhadra Majhi defeated Indian National Congress candidate Pradip Kumar Dishari by a margin of 24,895 votes.

2014 Vidhan Sabha Election, Lanjigarh
Party	Candidate	Votes	%	±%
BJD	Balabhadra Majhi	65,033	43.47	▲11.27
INC	Pradip Kumar Dishari	40,138	26.83	▼7.64
BJP	Bijaya Dishari	26,744	17.88	▼3.40
NOTA	None of the above	4,782	3.20	
Majority		24,895	17.19	
BJD gain from INC				

=== 2009 ===
In 2009 election, Indian National Congress candidate Shibaji Majhi defeated Biju Janata Dal candidate Balabhadra Majhi by a margin of 3,039 votes.

2009 Vidhan Sabha Election, Lanjigarh
Party	Candidate	Votes	%	±%
INC	Shibaji Majhi	46,138	34.47	−
BJD	Balabhadra Majhi	43,099	32.20	−
BJP	Bijaya Dishari	28,482	21.28	−
Majority		3,039	2.27 (Note: % of total valid votes)	−
Turnout		1,33,862	68.70	−
INC win (new seat)				
