= Badasahi (community development block) =

- Community development block
- Interactive map of Badasahi
- Location within Odisha
- Coordinates: 21.7271°N 86.7409°E
- Country: India
- State: Odisha
- District: Mayurbhanj
- Parliamentary constituency: Mayurbhanj
- Assembly constituency: Badasahi
- Formed: August 15, 1996

Area
  - Total: 14.15 sq mi (36.64 km^{2})
- Elevation: 167 ft (51 m)

Population (2011)
  - Total: 132,580
  - Density: 9,372/sq mi (3,618/km^{2})
- Time zone: UTC+5.30 (IST)
- PIN: 757026
- Vehicle registration: OD–11
- Literacy Rate: 63.89 per cent

Badasahi or Barsahi s a community development block that forms an administrative division in Baripada subdivision of Mayurbhanj district in the Indian state of Odisha. The block has six RI circles, i.e. (1) Pratappur (2) Khanua (3) Sankerko (4) Kuradiha (5) Durgapur (6) Manatri. Inhabited by around two lakh people and distributed in 30 panchayats and 224 revenue villages.
