= Susant Kumar Rout =

Indian politician

Member of the Odisha Legislative Assembly
- Incumbent
- Assumed office 2019
- Preceded by: Priyadarshi Mishra
- Constituency: Bhubaneswar North

Personal details
- Party: Biju Janata Dal
- Profession: Politician

Susant Kumar Rout is an Indian politician from Odisha. He is a Member of the Odisha Legislative Assembly from 2019, representing Bhubaneswar North Assembly constituency as a Member of the Biju Janata Dal.

== See also ==
- 2024 Odisha Legislative Assembly election
- Odisha Legislative Assembly
