= Agasti Behera =

Indian politician

Member of Odisha Legislative Assembly
- Incumbent
- Assumed office 4 June 2024
- Preceded by: Susanta Kumar Behera
- Constituency: Chhendipada

Personal details
- Party: Bharatiya Janata Party
- Profession: Politician

Agasti Behera is an Indian politician. He was elected to the Odisha Legislative Assembly from Chhendipada as a member of the Bharatiya Janata Party.
