= Sanatan Bijuli =

Indian politician

Member of Odisha Legislative Assembly
- Incumbent
- Assumed office 2019
- Constituency: Badasahi

Personal details
- Political party: Bharatiya Janata Party
- Profession: Politician

Sanatan Bijuli is an Indian politician from Odisha. He is a Member of the Odisha Legislative Assembly from 2019, representing Badasahi Assembly constituency as a Member of the Bharatiya Janata Party.

== See also ==
- 2019 Odisha Legislative Assembly election
- Odisha Legislative Assembly
