= Kanhai Charan Danga =

Indian politician

Member of Odisha Legislative Assembly
- Incumbent
- Assumed office 4 June 2024
- Preceded by: Mahidhar Rana
- Constituency: Kantamal

Personal details
- Party: Bharatiya Janata Party
- Profession: Politician

Kanhai Charan Danga is an Indian politician. He was elected to the Odisha Legislative Assembly from Kantamal as a member of the Bharatiya Janata Party.
