= Chhabi Malik =

Indian politician

Member of Odisha Legislative Assembly
- Incumbent
- Assumed office 4 June 2024
- Preceded by: Pramod Kumar Mallick
- Constituency: Niali

Personal details
- Party: Bharatiya Janata Party
- Profession: Politician

Chhabi Malik is an Indian politician. In 2024 he was elected to the Odisha Legislative Assembly from Niali as a member of the Bharatiya Janata Party.
