= Sanjib Kumar Mallick =

Politician from Odisha, India

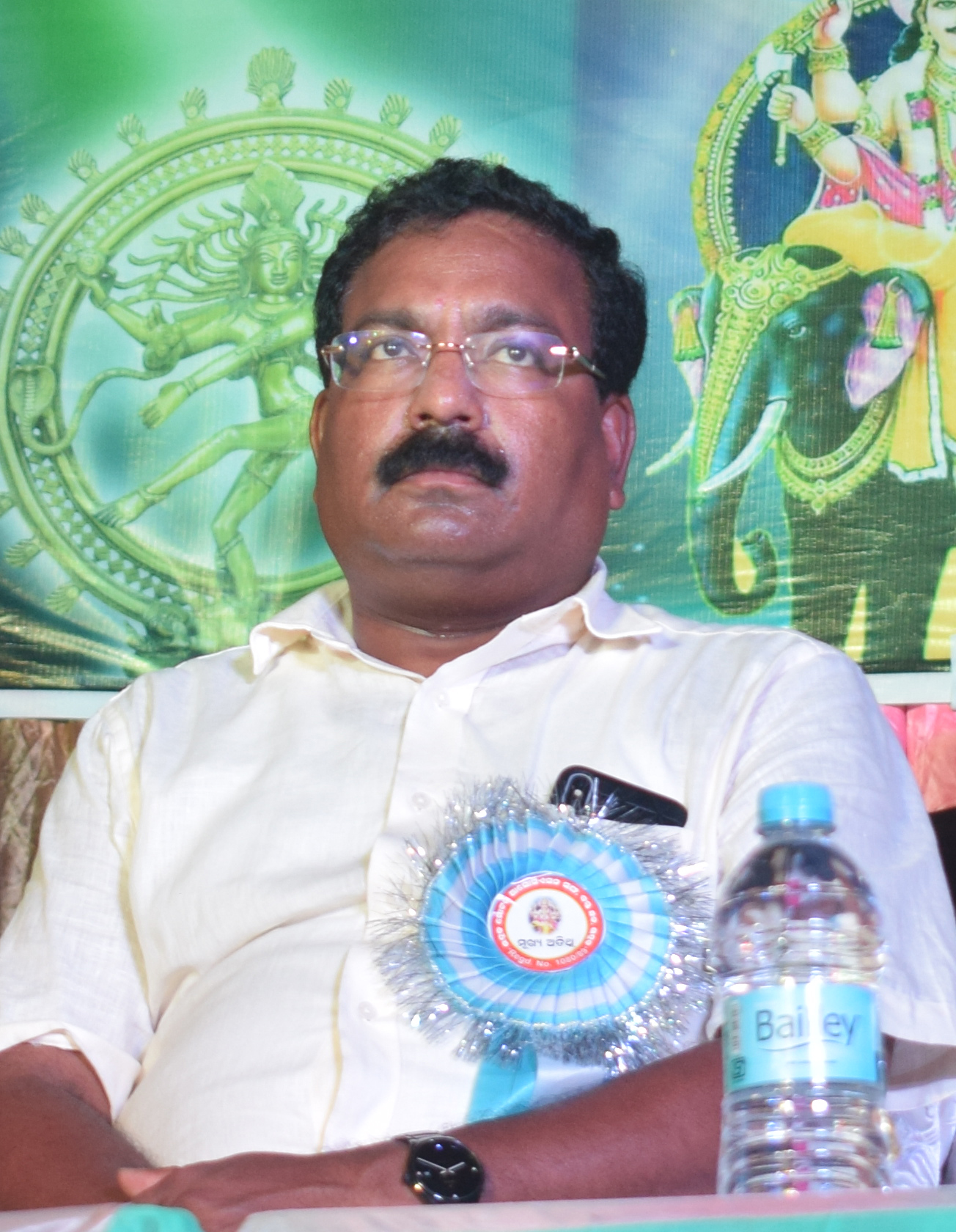
- Sanjib at Bhadrak in 2019 Biswakarma Puja

Member of the Odisha Legislative Assembly
- Incumbent
- Assumed office 2024
- Preceded by: Prafulla Samal
- Constituency: Bhandaripokhari

Member of the Odisha Legislative Assembly
- In office 2019–2024
- Preceded by: Jugal Kishore Pattnaik
- Succeeded by: Sitanshu Shekhar Mohpaatra
- Constituency: Bhadrak

Personal details
- Born: 11 April 1975 (age 51)
- Party: Biju Janata Dal
- Spouse: Priyadarsini Mallick
- Relations: Manas Ranjan Mallik (Brother)
- Parent(s): Hrudananda Mallick (Father); Annapurna Mallick (Mother)
- Occupation: Politician

Sanjib Kumar Mallick (born 11 April 1975) is an Indian politician who belongs to Odisha. He is active with Biju Janata Dal in Odisha politics. He was elected to the Odisha Legislative Assembly from Bhadrak constituency in the 2019 Odisha Legislative Assembly election as a member of the Biju Janata Dal. He defeated Pradip Nayak of Bharatiya Janata Party in a margin of 33,389 votes.

== Early life and family ==
Sanjib Mallick was born on 11 April 1975 in Bhadrak to former Indian politician Hrudananda Mallick and Annapurna Mallick. His brother Manas Ranjan Mallick was a member of Odisha Legislative Assembly.

== Political career ==
Sanjib has entered active politics after the death of his father and brother. He joined Biju Janata Dal and was elected in the 2019 Odisha Legislative Assembly election to 16th Odisha Vidhan Sabha from Bhadrak.
