= Sudhanshu Shekhar Parida =

Indian politician

Member of the Odisha Legislative Assembly for Remuna
- In office 29 April 2019 – 4 June 2024
- Preceded by: Gobinda Chandra Das; BJP
- Majority: 4,118 (2019)

Personal details
- Born: Sudhanshu Shekhar Parida; 2 March 1975 (age 51)
- Party: Biju Janata Dal
- Occupation: Politician

Sudhanshu Shekhar Parida (born 1975) is an Indian politician. He has been a member of the Odisha Legislative Assembly for Remuna from 2019 to 2024.

== Expulsion from the Biju Janata Dal party ==
On 21 September 2023, he was expelled from the party after following allegations that he siphoned off Rs.3 crore government subsidy amount meant for farmers during purchase of paddy harvester during 2017–18 and 2019–20. In 2025, BJD Supremo removes Expulsion order https://twitter.com/bjd_odisha/status/1880987364778192920 https://twitter.com/bjd_odisha/status/1880987364778192920

== Personal life ==
On 14 July 2020, he tested positive for COVID-19. Parida was under home quarantine after coming in contact with Nilgiri MLA Sukanta Kumar Nayak, who had earlier tested positive for the virus.

== Election results ==
Odisha Legislative Assembly
Year	Constituency	Candidate	Votes	Pct	Opponent(s)	Votes	Pct	Ballots cast	Majority	Turnout
2019	No.39 Remuna	Sudhanshu Shekhar Parida (BJD)	79,097	47.50%	Gobinda Chandra Das (BJP)	74,979	45.02%	166,536	4,118	74.35%
2019	No.39 Remuna	Sudhanshu Shekhar Parida (BJD)	79,097	47.50%	Pratap Kumar Sethi (INC)	9,454	5.68%	166,536	4,118	74.35%
2019	No.39 Remuna	Sudhanshu Shekhar Parida (BJD)	79,097	47.50%	None of the above	1,043	0.63%	166,536	4,118	74.35%
