= Nrusingha Charan Sahu =

Indian politician

Member of Odisha Legislative Assembly
- In office 2009–2024
- Constituency: Parjang

Personal details
- Political party: Biju Janata Dal
- Profession: Politician

Nrusingha Charan Sahu is an Indian politician from Odisha. He was a three times Member of the Odisha Legislative Assembly from 2009, 2014, 2019, representing Parjanga Assembly constituency as a Member of the Biju Janata Dal.

== See also ==
- 2019 Odisha Legislative Assembly election
- Odisha Legislative Assembly
