= Bibhuti Bhusan Pradhan =

Indian politician

Member of Odisha Legislative Assembly
- Incumbent
- Assumed office 4 June 2024
- Preceded by: Nrushingha Charan Sahu
- Constituency: Parjanga

Personal details
- Born: Pangatira
- Party: Bharatiya Janata Party
- Profession: Politician

Bibhuti Bhusan Pradhan is an Indian politician. He was elected to the Odisha Legislative Assembly from Parjanga as a member of the Bharatiya Janata Party.
