= Pradip Kumar Dishari =

Indian politician

Member of Odisha Legislative Assembly
- Incumbent
- Assumed office 4 June 2024
- Preceded by: Pradip Kumar Dishari
- Constituency: Lanjigarh

Personal details
- Party: Biju Janata Dal
- Profession: Politician

Pradip Kumar Dishari is an Indian politician who was elected to the Odisha Legislative Assembly from Lanjigarh as a member of the Biju Janata Dal.
