= Susanta Kumar Behera =

Indian politician

Member of Odisha Legislative Assembly
- In office 2014–2024
- Preceded by: Khageswar Behera
- Succeeded by: Agasti Behera
- Constituency: Chhendipada

Personal details
- Born: 17 March 1969 (age 57) Chhendipada, Odisha, India
- Party: Biju Janata Dal
- Education: Utkal University

Susanta Kumar Behera is an Indian politician from Odisha. He was a two time elected Member of the Odisha Legislative Assembly from 2014 and 2019, representing Chhendipada Assembly constituency as a Member of the Biju Janata Dal.

== See also ==
- 2019 Odisha Legislative Assembly election
- Odisha Legislative Assembly
