= Prafulla Samal =

Indian politician

Member of Odisha Legislative Assembly
- In office 1990–2004
- Preceded by: Jugal Kishore Pattnaik
- Succeeded by: Naredra Palei
- Constituency: Bhadrak
- In office 2009–2024
- Preceded by: Ananta Sethi
- Succeeded by: Sanjib Mallick
- Constituency: Bhandaripokhari

Personal details
- Party: Biju Janata Dal
- Other political affiliations: Janata Dal
- Profession: Politician

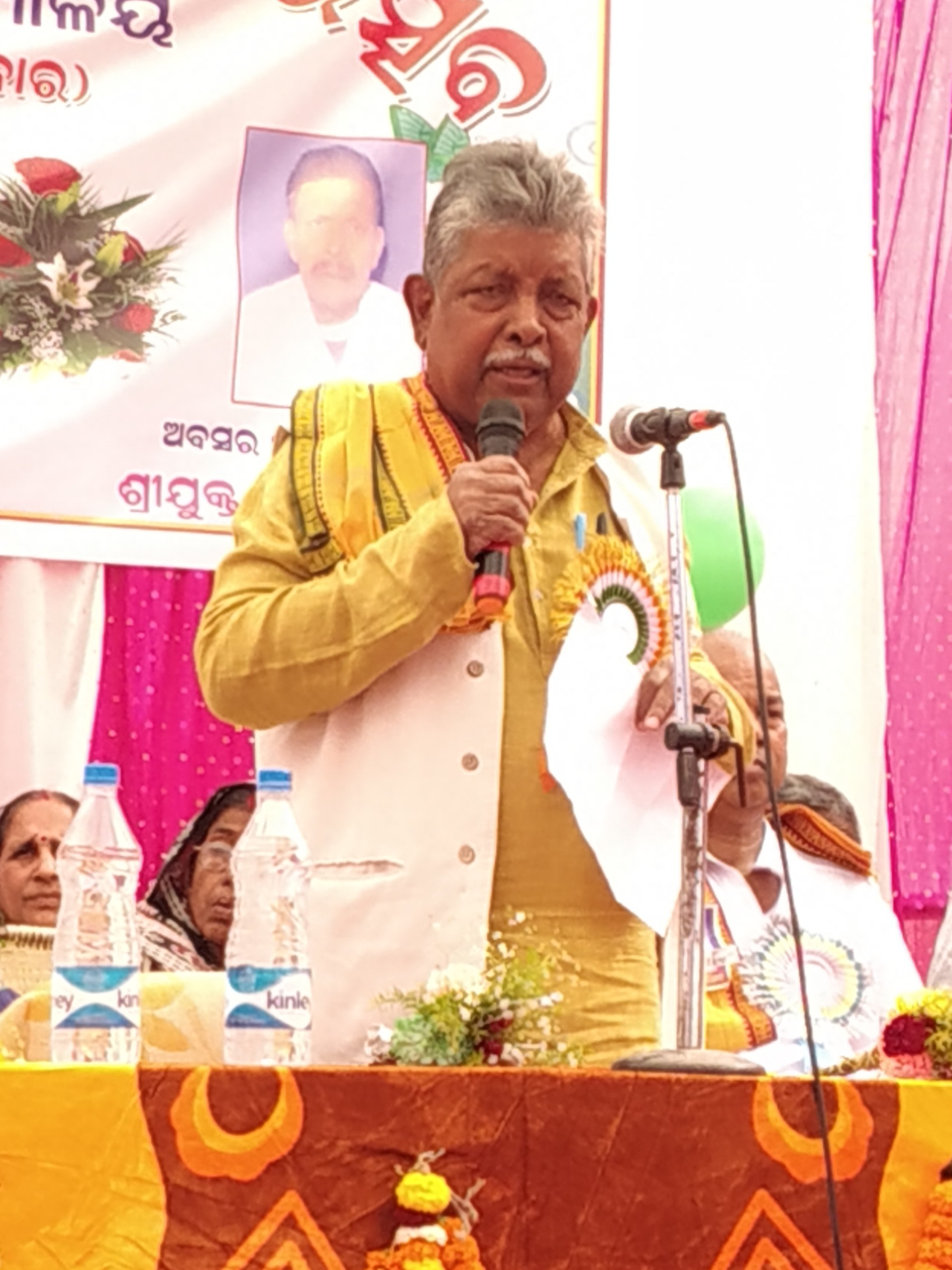
Odisha politician Prafulla Samal

Prafulla Samal is an Indian politician from Odisha. He was a six times elected Member of the Odisha Legislative Assembly from 1990, 1995, 2001(bypoll), 2009, 2014, and 2019, representing Bhadrak and Bhandaripokhari.

== Political career ==
Samal was first elected as a Member of the Odisha Legislative Assembly in 1990, 1995, and in a 2001 by-election, representing Bhadrak as a member of the Janata Dal. He was subsequently elected in 2009, 2014, and 2019, representing Bhandaripokhari as a member of the Biju Janata Dal.

== See also ==
- 2019 Odisha Legislative Assembly election
- Odisha Legislative Assembly
