= Atanu Sabyasachi Nayak =

Indian politician

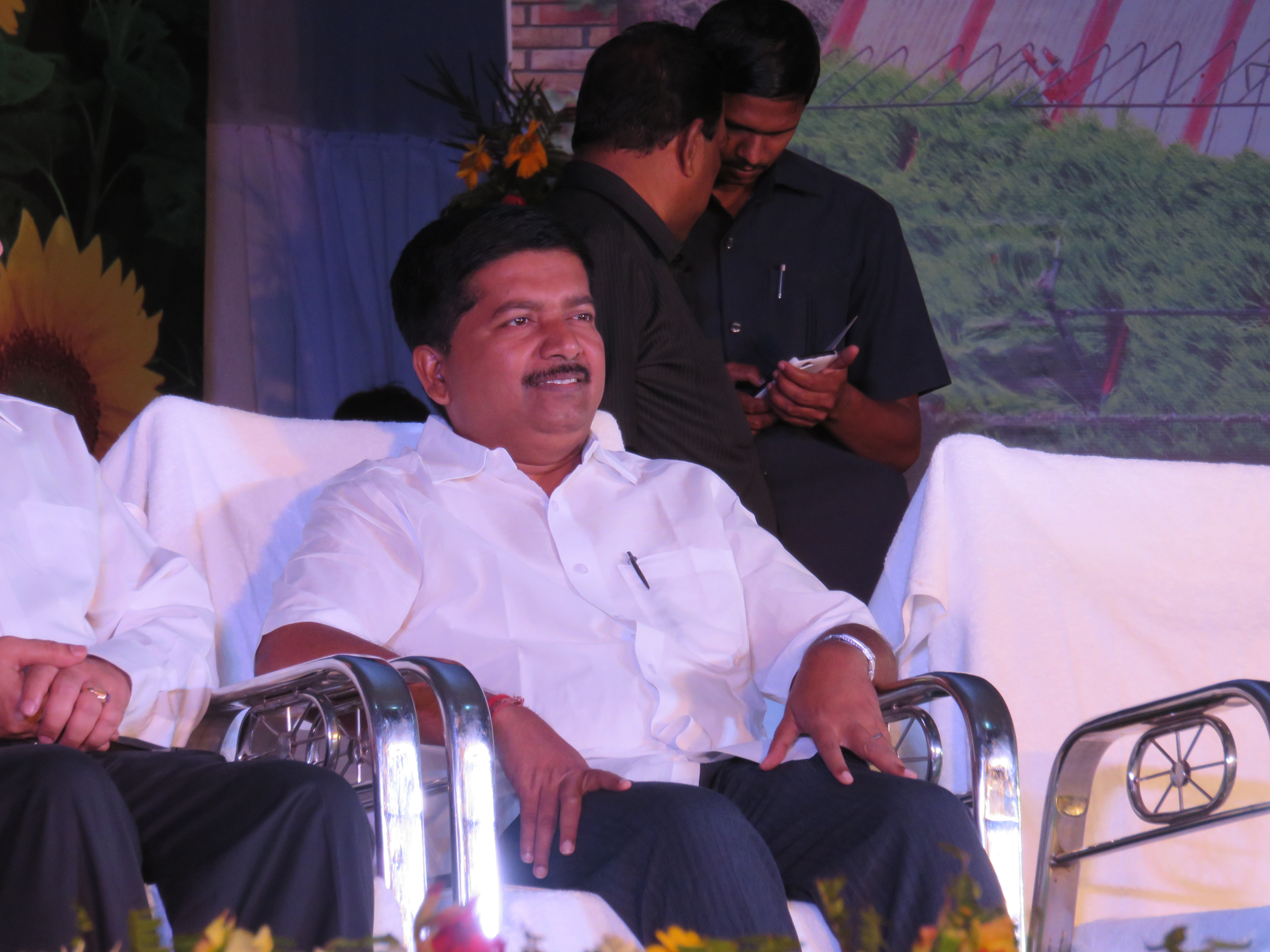
- Atanu Sabyasachi Nayak

Member: Legislative Assembly of Odisha
- Constituency: Mahakalapada

Personal details
- Born: Arilo, Sana-Adhanga
- Party: Biju Janata Dal
- Profession: Social service, politician

Atanu Sabyasachi Nayak is a politician from Odisha, India. He was the Health Minister in Odisha Legislative Assembly. He is an MLA representing Mahakalapada constituency from the Biju Janata Dal. He was inducted into Naveen Patnaik's Cabinet as Food Supplies and Consumer Welfare, Cooperation Minister in June 2022.
