= 6th Orissa Legislative Assembly =

6th state legislature of the Indian state of Orissa

←	5th Assembly	7th Assembly	→
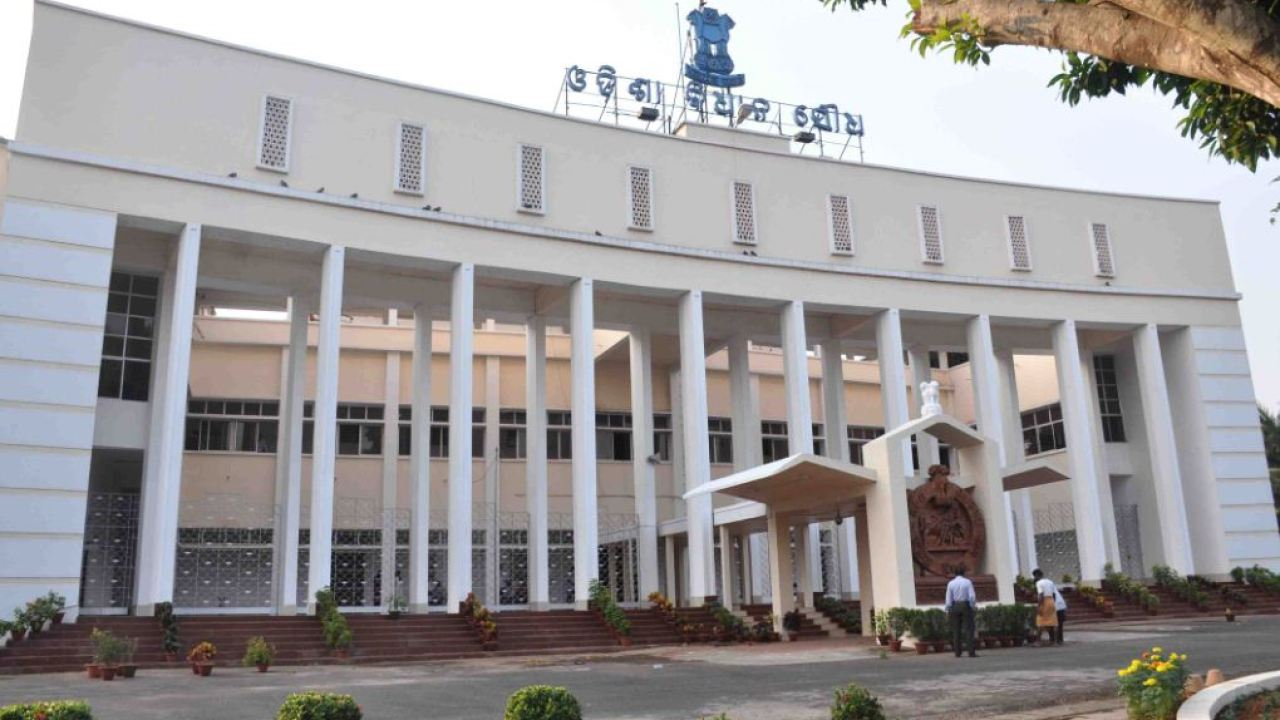
- Front view of Odisha Vidhan Saudha, Bhubaneshwar (2010)

Overview
- Meeting place: Odisha Vidhan Saudha, Bhubaneshwar, Odisha, India
- Term: 11 March 1974 – 20 April 1977
- Election: 1974 Orissa Legislative Assembly election
- Government: Indian National Congress (R)
- Opposition: Utkal Congress (1974); Bharatiya Lok Dal (1974-1977); Janata Party (1977)
- Website: assembly.odisha.gov.in

Orissa Legislative Assembly
- House Composition
- Members: 147
- Governor: Basappa Danappa Jatti; Justice Gati Krushna Misra (Acting); Akbar Ali Khan; Siba Narain Sankar (Acting); Harcharan Singh Brar
- Speaker: Brajamohan Mohanty, INC(R)
- Deputy Speaker: Chintamani Jena, INC(R)
- Leader of the House (Chief Minister): Nandini Satpathy, INC(R); Binayak Acharya,INC(R)
- Leader of Opposition: Biju Patnaik, UC/BLD; Ram Prasad Mishra, JP
- Party control: Indian National Congress (R) (70/147)
- 9 Sessions with 150 Sittings

The Sixth Orissa Legislative Assembly was convened after the 1974 Orissa Legislative Assembly election.

== Brief History ==
Smt. Nandini Satpathy's govt fell amidst large-scale defection of ruling Cong (R) MLAs. Due to high instability in the state, President's rule was imposed, assembly was dissolved and Elections were called after one year. Cong (R) led by Smt. Nandini Satpathy returned to power. She was sworn into office on 6 March 1974. Rise of her unpopularity and unhappy with her style of functioning, Cong (R) MLAs forced Smt. Satpathy to resign on 16 December 1976. The State was once again placed under President's rule with the Assembly being kept under suspended animation. On 29 December 1976, President's rule was lifted of with Shri Binayak Acharya swearing in as the Chief Minister of Odisha. Following lifting of Emergency and Janata Party's landslide win in 1977 Indian general election, Congress ruled state govt were dismissed, President's rule was imposed and Snap election were called.

== House Composition ==
Party	Strength
Indian National Congress (R)	70
Utkal Congress	35
Swatantra Party	21
Communist Party of India	7
Communist Party of India (Marxist)	3
Samyukta Socialist Party	2
Orissa Jana Congress	1
Jharkhand Party	1
Independent	7

== Office Bearers ==
Post	Portrait	Name	Tenure		Party
Governor		Basappa Danappa Jatti	Assembly Begins	20 August 1974	N/A
Governor		Justice; Gati Krushna Misra (Acting)	21 August 1974	25 October 1974	N/A
Governor		Akbar Ali Khan	25 October 1974	17 April 1976	N/A
Governor		Justice; Siba Narain Sankar (Acting)	17 April 1976	7 February 1977	N/A
Governor		Harcharan Singh Brar	7 February 1977	Assembly Dissolves	N/A
Speaker		Braja Mohan Mohanty; MLA from Puri	21 March 1974	26 June 1977	Indian National Congress (R)
Deputy Speaker		Chintamani Jena; MLA from Basta	29 March 1974	30 April 1977	Indian National Congress (R)
Leader of the House (Chief Minister)		Nandini Satpathy; MLA from Dhenkanal	6 March 1974	16 December 1976	Indian National Congress (R)
Leader of the House (Chief Minister)		Binayak Acharya; MLA from Berhampur	29 December 1976	30 April 1977	Indian National Congress (R)
Leader of Opposition		Biju Patnaik; MLA from Rajanagar	19 March 1974	10 December 1974	Utkal Congress
Leader of Opposition		Biju Patnaik; MLA from Rajanagar	10 December 1974	24 March 1977	Bharatiya Lok Dal
Leader of Opposition		Ram Prasad Mishra; MLA from Kantabanji	31 March 1977	30 April 1977	Janata Party

== Council of Ministers ==
=== Second Nandini Satpathy Ministry ===
Source
Portfolio	Portrait	Name Constituency	Tenure		Party
Chief Minister; Home; Political and Services; Planning & Coordination; Industries; Other departments not allocated to any Minister.		Binayak Acharya; MLA from Dhenkanal	6 March 1974	16 December 1976	INC(R)
Cabinet Minister
Finance; Excise		Binayak Acharya; MLA from Berhampur	6 March 1974	16 December 1976	INC(R)
Education & Youth Services		Jadunath Das Mohapatra; MLA from Soro	6 March 1974	16 December 1976	INC(R)
Tourism; Culture		Jadunath Das Mohapatra; MLA from Soro	6 March 1974	20 October 1975	INC(R)
Tourism; Culture		Gangadhar Mohapatra; MLA from Satyabadi	20 October 1975	16 December 1976	INC(R)
Commerce		Sriballav Panigrahi; MLA from Sambalpur	6 March 1974	20 October 1975	INC(R)
Food & Civil Supplies		Sriballav Panigrahi; MLA from Sambalpur	6 March 1974	20 October 1975	INC(R)
Food & Civil Supplies		Gangadhar Mohapatra; MLA from Satyabadi	20 October 1975	16 December 1976	INC(R)
Agriculture; Co-operation; Works		Laxman Mallick; MLA from Jagatsinghpur	6 March 1974	16 December 1976	INC(R)
Transport		Laxman Mallick; MLA from Jagatsinghpur	6 March 1974	20 October 1975	INC(R)
Rural Development		Banka Behari Das; MLA from Dharmasala	6 March 1974	24 May 1975	INC(R)
Rural Development		Laxman Mallick; MLA from Jagatsinghpur	24 May 1975	16 December 1976	INC(R)
Revenue		Banka Behari Das; MLA from Dharmasala	6 March 1974	24 May 1975	INC(R)
Revenue		Sriballav Panigrahi; MLA from Sambalpur	24 May 1975	16 December 1976	INC(R)
Tribal & Rural Welfare		Ulaka Rama Chandra; MLA from Rayagada	20 October 1975	16 December 1976	INC(R)
Minister of State
Community Development & Panchayati Raj		Mohan Nayak; MLA from Gopalpur	6 March 1974	16 December 1976	INC(R)
Health & Family Planning; Urban Development		Somanath Rath; MLA from Bhanjanagar	6 March 1974	16 December 1976	INC(R)
Tribal & Rural Welfare		Ulaka Rama Chandra; MLA from Rayagada	6 March 1974	20 October 1975	INC(R)
Law; Forest; Animal Husbandry		Brahmananda Biswal; MLA from Kamakhyanagar	6 March 1974	16 December 1976	INC(R)
Irrigation & Power		Dibyalochan Shekhar Deo; MLA from Sundargarh	6 March 1974	16 December 1976	INC(R)
Mines & Geology		Krupasindhu Bhoi; MLA from Padampur	6 March 1974	16 December 1976	INC(R)
Commerce; Transport		Krupasindhu Bhoi; MLA from Padampur	20 October 1975	16 December 1976	INC(R)
Labour & Employment; Housing		Benudhar Baliarsingh MLA from Khurda	6 March 1974	16 December 1976	INC(R)
Agriculture; Co-operation		Bhagirathi Gomango MLA from Gunupur	6 March 1974	24 May 1975	INC(R)
Rural Development		Bhagirathi Gomango MLA from Gunupur	24 May 1975	16 December 1976	INC(R)
Planning & Coordination; Industries		Kanhu Charan Lenka MLA from Choudwar	24 May 1975	16 December 1976	INC(R)
Deputy Minister
Education & Youth Services		Jagannath Pattanaik; MLA from Nawapara	6 March 1974	16 December 1976	INC(R)
Revenue; Community Development & Panchayati Raj		Sk. Matlub Ali; MLA from Mahanga	6 March 1974	24 May 1975	INC(R)
Tourism; Culture		Sk. Matlub Ali; MLA from Mahanga	24 May 1975	16 December 1976	INC(R)
Irrigation & Power		Kuanria Majhi; MLA from Baisinga	6 March 1974	24 May 1975	INC(R)
Industries		Kuanria Majhi; MLA from Baisinga	24 May 1975	16 December 1976	INC(R)

=== Binayak Acharya Ministry ===
Source
Portfolio	Portrait	Name Constituency	Tenure		Party
Chief Minister; Home; Political and Services; Finance; Planning & Coordination; Tribal & Rural Welfare; Other departments not allocated to any Minister.		Binayak Acharya; MLA from Berhampur	29 December 1976	30 April 1977	INC(R)
Cabinet Minister
Revenue; Irrigation & Power; Law; Education & Youth Services		Sriballav Panigrahi; MLA from Sambalpur	29 December 1976	30 April 1977	INC(R)
Food & Civil Supplies		Ulaka Rama Chandra; MLA from Rayagada	29 December 1976	30 April 1977	INC(R)
Works; Transport		Laxman Mallick; MLA from Jagatsinghpur	29 December 1976	30 April 1977	INC(R)
Community Development & Social Welfare; Urban Development		Mohan Nayak; MLA from Gopalpur	29 December 1976	30 April 1977	INC(R)
Industries; Commerce		Kanhu Charan Lenka; MLA from Choudwar	29 December 1976	30 April 1977	INC(R)
Excise; Labour & Employment; Housing		Benudhar Baliarsingh; MLA from Khurda	29 December 1976	30 April 1977	INC(R)
Health & Family Planning		Bhagirathi Gomango; MLA from Gunupur	29 December 1976	30 April 1977	INC(R)
Agriculture; Co-operation		Jogesh Chandra Rout; MLA from Banki	29 December 1976	30 April 1977	INC(R)
Minister of State
Finance; Planning & Coordination; Mines & Geology		Jagannath Pattanaik; MLA from Nawapara	29 December 1976	30 April 1977	INC(R)
Revenue; Education & Youth Services; Tourism; Culture		Sk. Matlub Ali; MLA from Mahanga	29 December 1976	30 April 1977	INC(R)
Forest; Fisheries & Animal Husbandry		Ananga Udaya Singh Deo; MLA from Loisingha	29 December 1976	30 April 1977	SWA
Rural Development; Tribal & Rural Welfare		Bhajaman Behara; MLA from Athmallik	29 December 1976	30 April 1977	INC(R)
Deputy Minister
Health & Family Planning		Mohan Nag; MLA from Bhatli	29 December 1976	30 April 1977	INC(R)

== Members of Legislative Assembly ==
Source
District	AC. No.	Constituency	Winner Candidate	Party	Remarks
Mayurbhanj	1	Karanjia (ST)	Karunakar Naik	Indian National Congress (R)	
Mayurbhanj	2	Jashipur (ST)	Ghanshyam Hemram	Independent	
Mayurbhanj	3	Bahalda (ST)	Sashi Bhusan Marndi	Independent	
Mayurbhanj	4	Rairangpur (ST)	Arjun Majhi	Utkal Congress	
Mayurbhanj	5	Bangriposi (ST)	Rudra Mohan Das	Communist Party of India	
Mayurbhanj	6	Kuliana (ST)	Sarat Chandra Singh	Indian National Congress (R)	
Mayurbhanj	7	Baripada	Promod Chandra Bhanjdeo	Independent	
Mayurbhanj	8	Baisinga (ST)	Kuanria Majhi	Indian National Congress (R)	
Mayurbhanj	9	Khunta (ST)	Ramesh Saren	Indian National Congress (R)	
Mayurbhanj	10	Udala (ST)	Ravaneswa Madhei	Indian National Congress (R)	
Baleshwar	11	Bhograi	Kartikeswar Patra	Indian National Congress (R)	
Baleshwar	12	Jaleswar	Gadadhar Giri	Samyukta Socialist Party	
Baleshwar	13	Basta	Chintamani Jena	Indian National Congress (R)	Deputy Speaker
Baleshwar	14	Balasore	Arun Dey	Communist Party of India	
Baleshwar	15	Soro	Jadunath Das Mahapatra	Indian National Congress (R)	
Baleshwar	16	Simulia	Sailen Mohapatra	Indian National Congress (R)	
Baleshwar	17	Nilgiri	Banamali Das	Communist Party of India (Marxist)	
Baleshwar	18	Bhandaripokhari (SC)	Bairagi Jena	Utkal Congress	
Baleshwar	19	Bhadrak	Jugal Kishore Pattanaik	Indian National Congress (R)	
Baleshwar	20	Dhamnagar	Hrudananda Mullick	Utkal Congress	
Baleshwar	21	Chandbali (SC)	Manmohan Das	Indian National Congress (R)	
Baleshwar	22	Basudevpur	Jagabandhu Das	Indian National Congress (R)	
Cuttack	23	Sukinda	Sanatan Deo	Indian National Congress (R)	
Cuttack	24	Korai	Ashok Kumar Das	Utkal Congress	
Cuttack	25	Jajpur (SC)	Jagannath Malik	Utkal Congress	
Cuttack	26	Dharamsala	Banka Bihari Das	Indian National Congress (R)	
Cuttack	27	Barchana	Dusasan Jena	Communist Party of India	
Cuttack	28	Bari-Derabisi	Prahlad Malik	Utkal Congress	
Cuttack	29	Binjharpur (SC)	Baishmab Charan Malik	Indian National Congress (R)	
Cuttack	30	Aul	Sarat Kumar Deb	Swatantra Party	
Cuttack	31	Patamundai (SC)	Biswanath Mallik	Indian National Congress (R)	
Cuttack	32	Rajnagar	Biju Patnaik	Utkal Congress	Leader of Opposition
Cuttack	33	Kendrapara	Bed Prakash Agarwal	Utkal Congress	
Cuttack	34	Patkura	Raj Kishore Nayak	Utkal Congress	
Cuttack	35	Tirtol	Pratap Chandra Mohanty	Utkal Congress	
Cuttack	36	Ersama	Lokanath Chowdhury	Communist Party of India	
Cuttack	37	Balikuda	Basudeb Mohapatra	Indian National Congress (R)	
Cuttack	38	Jagatsinghpur (SC)	Laxman Mallick	Indian National Congress (R)	
Cuttack	39	Kissannagar	Batakrushna Jena	Utkal Congress	
Cuttack	40	Mahanga	Shaik Matlub Ali	Indian National Congress (R)	
Cuttack	41	Salepur (SC)	Baidhar Behera	Indian National Congress (R)	
Cuttack	42	Gobindpur	Sudhansu Malini Ray	Indian National Congress (R)	
Cuttack	43	Cuttack Sadar	Trilochan Kanungo	Indian National Congress (R)	
Cuttack	44	Cuttack City	Srikanta Panda	Utkal Congress	
Cuttack	45	Choudwar	Kanhu Charan Lenka	Indian National Congress (R)	
Cuttack	46	Banki	Jogesh Chanda Rout	Independent	
Cuttack	47	Athgarh	Radhanath Rath	Independent	
Cuttack	48	Baramba	Raja Saheb Trilochan Singh Deo	Swatantra Party	
Puri	49	Balipatna (SC)	Gopinath Bhoi	Utkal Congress	
Puri	50	Bhubaneswar	Harekrushna Mahtab	Utkal Congress	
Puri	51	Jatni	Satyapriya Mohanty	Utkal Congress	
Puri	52	Pipli	Bipin Bihari Dash	Indian National Congress (R)	
Puri	53	Nimapara (SC)	Nilamani Sitha	Indian National Congress (R)	
Puri	54	Kakatpur	Brudaban Patra	Indian National Congress (R)	
Puri	55	Satyabadi	Gangadhar Mahapatra	Indian National Congress (R)	
Puri	56	Puri	Brajamohan Mohanty	Indian National Congress (R)	Speaker
Puri	57	Brahmagiri	Siddheswar Panigrahi	Communist Party of India	
Puri	58	Chilka	Vacant (till July 1974)		No Nomination was filed
Puri	58	Chilka	Raghunath Ray	Indian National Congress (R)	Won in 1974 bypoll.
Puri	59	Khurda	Benudhar Baliarsingh	Indian National Congress (R)	
Puri	60	Begunia	Satyanand Champatiray	Utkal Congress	
Puri	61	Ranpur	Ramesh Chandra Panda	Communist Party of India (Marxist)	
Puri	62	Nayagarh	Bhagabat Behera	Samyukta Socialist Party	
Puri	63	Khandapara	Satyasundar Misra	Independent	
Puri	64	Daspalla	Harihar Karana	Independent	
Ganjam	65	Jaganathprasad (SC)	Batsa Naik	Indian National Congress (R)	
Ganjam	66	Bhanjanagar	Somnath Rath	Indian National Congress (R)	
Ganjam	67	Suruda	Sarat Chanda Panda	Indian National Congress (R)	
Ganjam	68	Aska	Harihar Das	Communist Party of India	
Ganjam	69	Kabisuryanagar	Sadananda Mahanty	Communist Party of India	
Ganjam	70	Kodala	Kanhu Charan Nayak	Indian National Congress (R)	
Ganjam	71	Khallikote	V. Sugnana Kumari Deo	Utkal Congress	
Ganjam	72	Chatrapur	Daitari Behera	Utkal Congress	
Ganjam	73	Hinjili	Brundaban Nayak	Utkal Congress	
Ganjam	74	Gopalpur (SC)	Mohan Nayak	Indian National Congress (R)	
Ganjam	75	Berhampur	Binayak Acharya	Indian National Congress (R)	Chief MInister
Ganjam	76	Chikiti	Satchida Nandu Deo	Indian National Congress (R)	
Ganjam	77	Mohana	Udayanarayan Deb	Utkal Congress	
Ganjam	78	Ramagiri (ST)	Chakradhar Paik	Utkal Congress	
Ganjam	79	Parlakhemundi	Nalla Kurmanaikulu	Utkal Congress	
Koraput	80	Gunupur (ST)	Bhagirathi Gamang	Indian National Congress (R)	
Koraput	81	Bissam-cuttack (ST)	Ulaka Dambarudhar	Indian National Congress (R)	
Koraput	82	Rayagada (ST)	Ulka Rama Chandra	Indian National Congress (R)	
Koraput	83	Lakshmipur (ST)	Ananta Ram Majhi	Indian National Congress (R)	
Koraput	84	Pottangi (ST)	Disari Sannu	Utkal Congress	
Koraput	85	Koraput	Harish Chandra Baxipatra	Utkal Congress	
Koraput	86	Malkangiri (SC)	Naka Kannaya	Utkal Congress	
Koraput	87	Chitrakonda (ST)	Gangadhar Madi	Indian National Congress (R)	
Koraput	88	Kotpad (ST)	Basudeb Majhi	Indian National Congress (R)	
Koraput	89	Jeypore	Raghunath Patnaik	Indian National Congress (R)	
Koraput	90	Nowrangpur	Habibulla Khan	Swatantra Party	
Koraput	91	Kodinga (ST)	Sombaru Majhi	Utkal Congress	
Koraput	92	Dabugam (ST)	Syamoghomo Majhi	Swatantra Party	
Koraput	93	Umarkote (ST)	Rabisingh Majhi	Utkal Congress	
Kalahandi	94	Nawapara	Jagannath Pattanaik	Indian National Congress (R)	
Kalahandi	95	Khariar	Anupa Singh Deo	Utkal Congress	
Kalahandi	96	Dharamgarh (SC)	Dayanidhi Naik	Swatantra Party	
Kalahandi	97	Koksara	Chandrabhanu Singh Deo	Swatantra Party	
Kalahandi	98	Junagarh	Udit Pratap Deo	Swatantra Party	
Kalahandi	99	Bhawanipatna (SC)	Jagamohan Nayak	Swatantra Party	
Kalahandi	100	Narla (ST)	Dhaneswar Majhi	Swatantra Party	
Kalahandi	101	Kesinga	Sarat Chandra Singh Deo	Swatantra Party	
Phulabani	102	Balliguda (ST)	Sahura Mallik	Indian National Congress (R)	
Phulabani	103	Udayagiri (ST)	Gopal Pradhan	Indian National Congress (R)	
Phulabani	104	Phulbani (SC)	Chandra Sekhar Behera	Indian National Congress (R)	
Phulabani	105	Boudh	Natabar Pradhan	Swatantra Party	
Balangir	106	Titilagarh (SC)	Tapi Jal	Swatantra Party	
Balangir	107	Kantabanji	Ram Prasad Misra	Swatantra Party	Leader of Opposition
Balangir	108	Patnagarh	Ainthu Sahoo	Swatantra Party	
Balangir	109	Saintala	Krushna Chandra Panda	Swatantra Party	
Balangir	110	Loisingha	Ananga Udaya Singh Deo	Swatantra Party	
Balangir	111	Bolangir	Rajendra Narayan Singh Deo	Swatantra Party	
Balangir	112	Sonepur (SC)	Daulat Bagh	Swatantra Party	
Balangir	113	Binka	Radha Mohan Mishra	Swatantra Party	
Balangir	114	Birmaharajpur	Hrushikesh Hota	Indian National Congress (R)	
Dhenkanal	115	Athmallik	Bhajaman Behera	Indian National Congress (R)	
Dhenkanal	116	Angul	Adwait Prasad Singh	Utkal Congress	
Dhenkanal	117	Hindol (SC)	Bhagirathi Naik	Indian National Congress (R)	
Dhenkanal	118	Dhenkanal	Nandini Satpathy	Indian National Congress (R)	Chief Minister
Dhenkanal	119	Gondia	Sribatsa Nayak	Indian National Congress (R)	
Dhenkanal	120	Kamakhyanagar	Brahmananda Biswal	Indian National Congress (R)	
Dhenkanal	121	Pallahara	Narayan Sahu	Indian National Congress (R)	
Dhenkanal	122	Talcher (SC)	Brundaban Behera	Orissa Jana Congress	
Sambalpur	123	Padampur	Krupasindhu Bhoi	Indian National Congress (R)	
Sambalpur	124	Melchhamunda	Prakash Chandra Debta	Indian National Congress (R)	
Sambalpur	125	Bijepur	Gananath Pradhan	Utkal Congress	
Sambalpur	126	Bhatli (SC)	Mohan Nag	Indian National Congress (R)	
Sambalpur	127	Bargarh	Nabin Kumar Pradhan	Utkal Congress	
Sambalpur	128	Sambalpur	Shri Ballav Panigrahi	Utkal Congress	
Sambalpur	129	Brajarajnagar	Prasanna Kumar Panda	Communist Party of India	
Sambalpur	130	Jharsuguda	Sairendhri Nayak	Indian National Congress (R)	
Sambalpur	131	Laikera (ST)	Hemanand Biswal	Indian National Congress (R)	
Sambalpur	132	Kuchinda (ST)	Jagateswar Mirdha	Indian National Congress (R)	
Sambalpur	133	Rairakhol (SC)	Basanta Kumar Mohananda	Utkal Congress	
Sambalpur	134	Deogarh	Tribhuban Deb	Swatantra Party	
Sundergarh	135	Sundargarh	Dibyalochan Sekhar Deo	Indian National Congress (R)	
Sundergarh	136	Talsara (ST)	Premananda Kalo	Indian National Congress (R)	
Sundergarh	137	Rajgangpur (ST)	Christopher Ekka	Indian National Congress (R)	
Sundergarh	138	Biramitrapur (ST)	Christodas Luhgun	Jharkhand Party	
Sundergarh	139	Rourkela	Dhananjaya Mohanty	Indian National Congress (R)	
Sundergarh	140	Raghunathpali (ST)	Agapit Lakra	Indian National Congress (R)	
Sundergarh	141	Bonai (ST)	Benudhar Naik	Indian National Congress (R)	
Keonjhar	142	Champua (ST)	Guru Charan Naik	Indian National Congress (R)	
Keonjhar	143	Patna	Maheswar Majhi	Utkal Congress	
Keonjhar	144	Keonjhar (ST)	Govinda Munda	Swatantra Party	
Keonjhar	145	Telkoi (ST)	Niladri Naik	Utkal Congress	
Keonjhar	146	Ramchandrapur	Murlidhar Kuanr	Utkal Congress	
Keonjhar	147	Anandapur (SC)	Bhubananda Jena	Indian National Congress (R)	

== Bypolls ==
Source
Year	Constituency	Reason for by-poll	Winning candidate	Party
July 1974	Chilika	No nomination was filed	Raghunath Ray	Indian National Congress (R)
