= Second Nandini Satpathy ministry =

Government of Odisha (1974 – 1976)

- 15th Ministry of Orissa
- 1974 – 1976
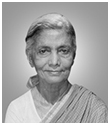
- Nandini Satpathy; Hon'ble Chief Minister of Orissa
- Date formed: 6 March 1974
- Date dissolved: 16 December 1976

People and organisations
- Governor: B. D. Jatti; Justice Gati Krushna Misra (acting); Akbar Ali Khan; Justice Siba Narain Sankar (acting)
- Chief Minister: Nandini Satpathy
- No. of ministers: 18
- Member parties: Indian National Congress (R)
- Status in legislature: Minority
- Opposition party: Utkal Congress (1974); Bharatiya Lok Dal (1974 – 1976)
- Opposition leader: Biju Patnaik

History
- Incoming formation: 6th Orissa Legislative Assembly
- Outgoing formation: 5th Orissa Legislative Assembly
- Election: 1974 Assembly election
- Legislature terms: 2 years, 285 days
- Predecessor: First Nandini Satpathy ministry
- Successor: Binayak Acharya ministry

Nandini Satpathy was sworn in for the Second time as the chief minister of Orissa following Cong (R)'s victory in 1974 Orissa Assembly election. President's Rule was lifted off after over one year.

== Brief history ==
Nadini Satpathy's first term as Chief minister lasted for mere 9 months as the govt fell due to large-scale defection from the ruling party. Major party position's were continuously fluctuating with merger and counter merger & defection and counter defection. Due to high instability in the state assembly, President's Rule was imposed on 3 March 1973 for over a year. Snap election were held on 1974. Cong (R) led by Smt. Nandini Satpathy won the 1974 Assembly election. On 6 March 1974, Smt. Satpathy along with 4 Cabinet ministers, 8 Ministers of state and 3 deputy ministers were administered the oath of office and secrecy by Governor B. D. Jatti at the Raj Bhavan, Bhubaneswar.

Ministry was further expanded on 20 October 1975.

Due to her rising unpopularity and unhappy with her style of functioning, Cong (R) MLAs forced Smt. Satpathy to resign on 16 December 1976. The State was placed under President's rule with the Assembly being kept under suspended animation. On 29 December 1976, President's rule was lifted of and Shri Binayak Acharya was sworn in as the new Chief Minister.

== Council of Ministers ==
Source
Portfolio	Portrait	Name Constituency	Tenure		Party
Chief Minister; Home; Political and Services; Planning & Coordination; Industries; Other departments not allocated to any Minister.		Nandini Satpathy; MLA from Dhenkanal	6 March 1974	16 December 1976	INC(R)
Cabinet Minister
Finance; Excise		Binayak Acharya; MLA from Berhampur	6 March 1974	16 December 1976	INC(R)
Education & Youth Services		Jadunath Das Mohapatra; MLA from Soro	6 March 1974	16 December 1976	INC(R)
Tourism; Culture		Jadunath Das Mohapatra; MLA from Soro	6 March 1974	20 October 1975	INC(R)
Tourism; Culture		Gangadhar Mohapatra; MLA from Satyabadi	20 October 1975	16 December 1976	INC(R)
Commerce		Sriballav Panigrahi; MLA from Sambalpur	6 March 1974	20 October 1975	INC(R)
Food & Civil Supplies		Sriballav Panigrahi; MLA from Sambalpur	6 March 1974	20 October 1975	INC(R)
Food & Civil Supplies		Gangadhar Mohapatra; MLA from Satyabadi	20 October 1975	16 December 1976	INC(R)
Agriculture; Co-operation; Works		Laxman Mallick; MLA from Jagatsinghpur	6 March 1974	16 December 1976	INC(R)
Transport		Laxman Mallick; MLA from Jagatsinghpur	6 March 1974	20 October 1975	INC(R)
Rural Development		Banka Behari Das; MLA from Dharmasala	6 March 1974	24 May 1975	INC(R)
Rural Development		Laxman Mallick; MLA from Jagatsinghpur	24 May 1975	16 December 1976	INC(R)
Revenue		Banka Behari Das; MLA from Dharmasala	6 March 1974	24 May 1975	INC(R)
Revenue		Sriballav Panigrahi; MLA from Sambalpur	24 May 1975	16 December 1976	INC(R)
Tribal & Rural Welfare		Ulaka Rama Chandra; MLA from Rayagada	20 October 1975	16 December 1976	INC(R)
Minister of State
Community Development & Panchayati Raj		Mohan Nayak; MLA from Gopalpur	6 March 1974	16 December 1976	INC(R)
Health & Family Planning; Urban Development		Somanath Rath; MLA from Bhanjanagar	6 March 1974	16 December 1976	INC(R)
Tribal & Rural Welfare		Ulaka Rama Chandra; MLA from Rayagada	6 March 1974	20 October 1975	INC(R)
Law; Forest; Animal Husbandry		Brahmananda Biswal; MLA from Kamakhyanagar	6 March 1974	16 December 1976	INC(R)
Irrigation & Power		Dibyalochan Shekhar Deo; MLA from Sundargarh	6 March 1974	16 December 1976	INC(R)
Mines & Geology		Krupasindhu Bhoi; MLA from Padampur	6 March 1974	16 December 1976	INC(R)
Commerce; Transport		Krupasindhu Bhoi; MLA from Padampur	20 October 1975	16 December 1976	INC(R)
Labour & Employment; Housing		Benudhar Baliarsingh; MLA from Khurda	6 March 1974	16 December 1976	INC(R)
Agriculture; Co-operation		Bhagirathi Gomango; MLA from Gunupur	6 March 1974	24 May 1975	INC(R)
Rural Development		Bhagirathi Gomango; MLA from Gunupur	24 May 1975	16 December 1976	INC(R)
Planning & Coordination; Industries		Kanhu Charan Lenka MLA from Choudwar	24 May 1975	16 December 1976	INC(R)
Deputy Minister
Education & Youth Services		Jagannath Pattanaik; MLA from Nawapara	6 March 1974	16 December 1976	INC(R)
Revenue; Community Development & Panchayati Raj		Sk. Matlub Ali; MLA from Mahanga	6 March 1974	24 May 1975	INC(R)
Tourism; Culture		Sk. Matlub Ali; MLA from Mahanga	24 May 1975	16 December 1976	INC(R)
Irrigation & Power		Kuanria Majhi; MLA from Baisinga	6 March 1974	24 May 1975	INC(R)
Industries		Kuanria Majhi; MLA from Baisinga	24 May 1975	16 December 1976	INC(R)

== Demographics ==
Division	District	Ministers	Cabinet Ministers	Ministers of State / Deputy Ministers
Central	Cuttack	4	Banka Behari Das; Laxman Mallick	Kanhu Charan Lenka; Sk. Matlub Ali
Central	Puri	2	Gangadhar Mohapatra	Benudhar Baliarsingh
Central	Balasore	1	Jadunath Das Mohapatra	–
Central	Mayurbhanj	1	–	Kuanria Majhi
Northern	Sambalpur	2	Sriballav Panigrahi	Krupasindhu Bhoi
Northern	Sundergarh	1	–	Dibyalochan Shekhar Deo
Northern	Keonjhar	0	–	–
Northern	Dhenkanal	2	Nandini Satpathy (Chief Minister)	Brahmananda Biswal
Northern	Balangir	0	–	–
Southern	Ganjam	3	Binayak Acharya	Somanath Rath; Mohan Nayak
Southern	Kalahandi	1	–	Jagannath Pattanaik
Southern	Koraput	2	Ulaka Rama Chandra	Bhagirathi Gomango
Southern	Phulbani	0	–	–
