= First Nandini Satpathy ministry =

Government of Odisha (1972 – 1973)

- 14th Ministry of Orissa
- 1972 – 1973
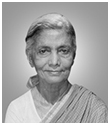
- Nandini Satpathy; Hon'ble Chief Minister of Orissa
- Date formed: 14 June 1972
- Date dissolved: 3 March 1973

People and organisations
- Governor: Jogendra Singh (acting); Justice Gati Krushna Misra (acting); B. D. Jatti
- Chief Minister: Nandini Satpathy
- Deputy Chief Minister: Nilamani Routray
- No. of ministers: 15
- Member parties: Indian National Congress (R) + Utkal Congress
- Status in legislature: Majority
- Opposition party: Swatantra Party (1972 – 1973); Utkal Congress (1973)
- Opposition leader: Rajendra Narayan Singh Deo (1972 – 1973); Biju Patnaik (1973)

History
- Incoming formation: 5th Orissa Legislative Assembly
- Election: 1971 Assembly election
- Legislature term: 262 days
- Predecessor: Second Bishwanath Das ministry
- Successor: Second Nandini Satpathy ministry

Nandini Satpathy was sworn in for the first time as the chief minister of Orissa following resignation of Shri Biswanath Das.

== Brief history ==
Shri Biswanath Das led a coalition govt formed by Swatantra Party, Utkal Congress and Praja Socialist Party. With large number of defection of ruling coalition members to Indian National Congress (R), Shri Das resigned on 14 June 1972, barely ruling the state for over a year. On same day, Leader of Congress (R) Party, Smt. Nandini Satpathy was sworn in as the first female CM of the state. She cobbled a coalition together with Utkal Congress. Smt. Satpathy along with 8 Cabinet ministers, 5 Ministers of state and 1 deputy minister were administered the oath of office and secrecy by Governor Sardar Jogendra Singh at the Raj Bhavan, Bhubaneswar.

Dissatisfied with the governance of the state, Utkal Congress left the coalition on 1st March 1973. Smt. Satpathy resigned on 3 March 1973. The State was placed under President's rule with the Assembly dissolved and snap election were called which was held on 1974.

== Council of Ministers ==
Source
Portfolio	Portrait	Name Constituency	Tenure		Party
Chief Minister; Home; Political and Services (except Parliamentary Affairs); Rural Development; Other departments not allocated to any Minister.		Nandini Satpathy; MLA from Cuttack City	14 June 1972	3 March 1973	INC(R)
Cabinet Minister
Deputy Chief Minister; Industries; Supply; Law		Nilamani Routray; MLA from Basudebpur	14 June 1972	1 March 1973	Utkal Congress
Revenue; Irrigation & Power; Mines & Geology		Braja Mohan Mohanty; MLA from Puri	14 June 1972	3 March 1973	INC(R)
Agriculture; Co-operation; Labour & Employment; Housing; Urban Development		Binayak Acharya; MLA from Berhampur	14 June 1972	3 March 1973	INC(R)
Finance; Commerce; Planning & Coordination; Health & Family Planning		Banka Behari Das; MLA from Dharmasala	14 June 1972	3 March 1973	INC(R)
Tribal & Rural Welfare		Gangadhar Pradhan; MLA from Talsara	14 June 1972	1 March 1973	SWA
Works; Transport; Excise; Community Development & Panchayati Raj		Laxman Mallick; MLA from Jagatsinghpur	14 June 1972	3 March 1973	INC(R)
Education & Youth Services; Tourism; Culture; Parliamentary Affairs in Political and Services		Sriballav Panigrahi; MLA from Sambalpur	14 June 1972	3 March 1973	INC(R)
Forest; Animal Husbandry		Achyutananda Mahananda; MLA from Kantabanji	14 June 1972	3 March 1973	SWA
Minister of State
Irrigation & Power		Damburu Majhi; MLA from Dabugam	14 June 1972	3 March 1973	SWA
Health & Family Welfare		Somanath Rath; MLA from Bhanjanagar	14 June 1972	3 March 1973	INC(R)
Supply		Bhagirathi Gomango; MLA from Gunupur	14 June 1972	3 March 1973	INC(R)
Agriculture; Co-operation		Gobinda Chandra Sethi; MLA from Nimapara	14 June 1972	3 March 1973	Utkal Congress
Community Development & Panchayati Raj		Krupasindhu Bhoi; MLA from Padampur	14 June 1972	3 March 1973	INC(R)
Deputy Minister
Rural Development		Bhajaman Behara; MLA from Chhendipada	14 June 1972	3 March 1973	Utkal Congress

== Demographics ==
Division	District	Ministers	Cabinet Ministers	Ministers of State / Deputy Ministers
Central	Cuttack	3	Nandini Satpathy (Chief Minister); Banka Behari Das; Laxman Mallick	–
Central	Puri	2	Braja Mohan Mohanty	Gobinda Chandra Sethi
Central	Balasore	1	Nilamani Routray (Deputy CM)	–
Central	Mayurbhanj	0	–	–
Northern	Sambalpur	2	Sriballav Panigrahi	Krupasindhu Bhoi
Northern	Sundergarh	1	Gangadhar Pradhan	–
Northern	Keonjhar	0	–	–
Northern	Dhenkanal	0	–	–
Northern	Balangir	1	Achyutananda Mahananda	–
Southern	Ganjam	2	Binayak Acharya	Somanath Rath
Southern	Kalahandi	1	–	Jagannath Pattanaik
Southern	Koraput	2	–	Damburu Majhi; Bhagirathi Gomango
Southern	Phulbani	0	–	–
