= 5th Orissa Legislative Assembly =

5th state legislature of the Indian state of Orissa

←	4th Assembly	6th Assembly	→
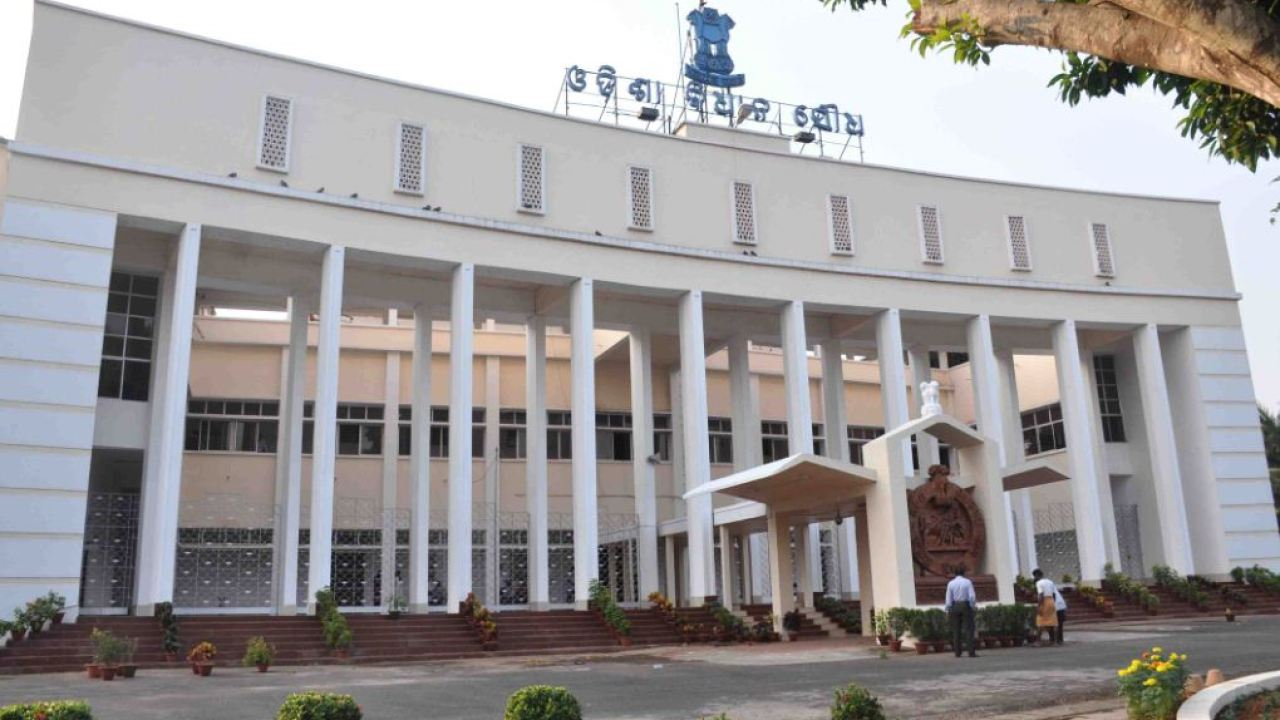
- Front view of Odisha Vidhan Saudha, Bhubaneshwar (2010)

Overview
- Meeting place: Odisha Vidhan Saudha, Bhubaneshwar, Odisha, India
- Term: 23 March 1971 – 3 March 1973
- Election: 1971 Orissa Legislative Assembly election
- Government: SWP + UTC + PSP (till 14/06/1972); Indian National Congress (R) (after 14/06/1972)
- Opposition: Indian National Congress (R) (till 14/06/1972); SWP + UTC + PSP (after 14/06/1972)
- Website: assembly.odisha.gov.in

Orissa Legislative Assembly
- House Composition
- Members: 140
- Governor: Shaukatullah Shah Ansari; Sardar Jogendra Singh (Acting); Justice Gati Krushna Misra (Acting); Basappa Danappa Jatti
- Speaker: Nandakishore Mishra, SWP
- Deputy Speaker: Narayan Birabar Samanta, UTC
- Leader of the House (Chief Minister): Biswanath Das, IND; Nandini Satpathy, INC (R)
- Leader of Opposition: Binayak Acharya, INC (R); Rajendra Narayan Singh Deo, SWP; Biju Patnaik, UTC
- Party control: SWP + UTC + PSP (73/140) (till 14/06/1972); Indian National Congress (R) (71/140) (after 14/06/1972)
- 5 Sessions with 97 Sittings

The Fifth Orissa Legislative Assembly was convened after the 1971 Orissa Legislative Assembly election.

== Brief History ==
Swatantra Party, Utkal Congress and Praja Socialist Party formed a Coalition Ministry with Biswanath Das as the Chief Minister. With large number of defection of ruling coalition members to Indian National Congress (R), Shri Das resigned on 14 June 1972. Leader of Congress (R) Party, Nandini Satpathy, was sworn in the same day and continued till 3 March 1973. This govt also fell within 9 months as once again, there was large-scale defection from the ruling party. Subsequently, President's Rule was imposed and snap election was called. Throughout this tumultuous period, Major party position's were continuously fluctuating with merger and counter merger & defection and counter defection.

== House Composition ==
Party	Strength
Indian National Congress (R)	51
Swatantra Party	36
Utkal Congress	33
Praja Socialist Party	4
Communist Party of India	4
Jharkhand Party	4
Communist Party of India (Marxist)	2
Indian National Congress (O)	1
Orissa Jana Congress	1
Independent	4

== Office Bearers ==
Post	Portrait	Name	Tenure		Party
Governor		Shaukatullah Shah Ansari	Assembly Begins	20 September 1971	N/A
Governor		Jogendra Singh (Acting)	20 September 1971	30 June 1972	N/A
Governor		Justice; Gati Krushna Misra (Acting)	1 July 1972	8 November 1972	N/A
Governor		Basappa Danappa Jatti	8 November 1972	Assembly Dissolves	N/A
Speaker		Nandakishore Mishra; MLA from Loisingha	12 April 1971	3 March 1973	Swatantra Party
Deputy Speaker		Narayan Birabar Samanta; MLA from Erasama	6 May 1971	3 March 1973	Utkal Congress
Leader of the House (Chief Minister)		Bishwanath Das; MLA from Rourkela	3 April 1971	14 June 1972	Independent
Leader of the House (Chief Minister)		Nandini Satpathy; MLA from Cuttack City	14 June 1972	3 March 1973	Indian National Congress (R)
Deputy Leader of the House (Deputy Chief Minister)		Nilamani Routray; MLA from Basudebpur	14 June 1972	1 March 1973	Utkal Congress
Leader of Opposition		Binayak Acharya; MLA from Berhampur	4 May 1971	14 June 1972	Indian National Congress (R)
Leader of Opposition		Rajendra Narayan Singh Deo; MLA from Bolangir	14 June 1972	9 February 1973	Swatantra Party
Leader of Opposition		Biju Patnaik; MLA from Rajanagar	9 February 1973	3 March 1973	Utkal Congress

== Council of Ministers ==
=== Second Bishwanath Das Ministry ===
Source
Portfolio	Portrait	Name Constituency	Tenure		Party
Chief Minister; Finance; Planning & Coordination; Other departments not allocated to any Minister.		Bishwanath Das; MLA from Rourkela	3 April 1971	14 June 1972	Independent
Cabinet Minister
Political and Services (except River Valley Development); Tourism & Public Relations in Home; Industries		Rajendra Narayan Singh Deo; MLA from Bolangir	3 April 1971	14 June 1972	SWA
Home (except Tourism & Public Relations); Supply; State Public Corporation & Under-taking		Nilamani Routray; MLA from Basudebpur	3 April 1971	14 June 1972	Utkal Congress
Labour & Employment; Housing		Sidhalal Murmu; MLA from Rairangpur	3 April 1971	14 June 1972	All India Jharkhand Party
Excise; Commerce		Dayanidhi Naik; MLA from Bhawanipatna	3 April 1971	14 June 1972	SWA
Co-operation; Rural Development; Urban Development		Brundaban Nayak; MLA from Hinjili	3 April 1971	14 June 1972	Utkal Congress
Animal Husbandry		Gangadhar Pradhan; MLA from Talsara	3 April 1971	14 June 1972	SWA
Irrigation & Power (except Lift Irrigation); River Valley Development in Political and Services		Prahlad Mallik; MLA from Patamundai	3 April 1971	14 June 1972	Utkal Congress
Agriculture; Community Development & Panchayati Raj		Ananta Narayan Singh Deo; MLA from Suruda	3 April 1971	14 June 1972	SWA
Revenue; Lift Irrigation in Irrigation & Power		Pratap Chandra Mohanty; MLA from Tirtol	3 April 1971	14 June 1972	Utkal Congress
Forest; Works		Ainthu Sahoo; MLA from Patnagarh	3 April 1971	14 June 1972	SWA
Education; Culture		Sarat Kumar Kar; MLA from Mahanga	3 April 1971	14 June 1972	Utkal Congress
Law; Tribal & Rural Welfare		Natabara Pradhan; MLA from Baudh	3 April 1971	14 June 1972	SWA
Health & Family Planning		Ram Krushna Patnaik; MLA from Kodala	3 April 1971	14 June 1972	Utkal Congress
Minister of State
Agriculture; Co-operation; Transport		Damburu Majhi; MLA from Dabugam	3 April 1971	14 June 1972	SWA
Finance; Culture		Jadunath Das Mohapatra; MLA from Soro	3 April 1971	14 June 1972	Utkal Congress
Tribal & Rural Welfare; Tourism & Public Relations in Home		Ghasiram Majhi; MLA from Nawapara	3 April 1971	14 June 1972	SWA
Irrigation & Power (except Lift Irrigation)		Birabhadra Singh; MLA from Khunta	3 April 1971	14 June 1972	Utkal Congress
Industries; Planning & Coordination		Bhanuganga Tribhuban Deb; MLA from Bhanjanagar	3 April 1971	14 June 1972	SWA
Rural Development; Urban Development; Mines & Geology		Saharai Oram; MLA from Champua	3 April 1971	14 June 1972	Utkal Congress
Commerce; Animal Husbandry		Prafulla Kumar Das; MLA from Karanjia	3 April 1971	14 June 1972	SWA
Home (except Tourism & Public Relations); Supply; State Public Corporation & Under-taking		Debaraja Sahu; MLA from Angul	3 April 1971	14 June 1972	Utkal Congress
Works; Excise		Sarat Kumar Deb; MLA from Aul	3 April 1971	14 June 1972	SWA
Revenue; Lift Irrigation in Irrigation & Power		Gobinda Chandra Sethi; MLA from Nimapara	3 April 1971	14 June 1972	Utkal Congress
Community Development & Panchayati Raj		Ramachandra Praharaj; MLA from Banpur	3 April 1971	14 June 1972	SWA
Health & Family Planning		Rabi Singh Majhi; MLA from Umerkote	3 April 1971	14 June 1972	Utkal Congress

=== First Nandini Satpathy Ministry ===
Source
Portfolio	Portrait	Name Constituency	Tenure		Party
Chief Minister; Home; Political and Services (except Parliamentary Affairs); Rural Development; Other departments not allocated to any Minister.		Nandini Satpathy; MLA from Cuttack City	14 June 1972	3 March 1973	INC(R)
Cabinet Minister
Deputy Chief Minister; Industries; Supply; Law		Nilamani Routray; MLA from Basudebpur	14 June 1972	1 March 1973	Utkal Congress
Revenue; Irrigation & Power; Mines & Geology		Braja Mohan Mohanty; MLA from Puri	14 June 1972	3 March 1973	INC(R)
Agriculture; Co-operation; Labour & Employment; Housing; Urban Development		Binayak Acharya; MLA from Berhampur	14 June 1972	3 March 1973	INC(R)
Finance; Commerce; Planning & Coordination; Health & Family Planning		Banka Behari Das; MLA from Dharmasala	14 June 1972	3 March 1973	INC(R)
Tribal & Rural Welfare		Gangadhar Pradhan; MLA from Talsara	14 June 1972	1 March 1973	SWA
Works; Transport; Excise; Community Development & Panchayati Raj		Laxman Mallick; MLA from Jagatsinghpur	14 June 1972	3 March 1973	INC(R)
Education & Youth Services; Tourism; Culture; Parliamentary Affairs in Political and Services		Sriballav Panigrahi; MLA from Sambalpur	14 June 1972	3 March 1973	INC(R)
Forest; Animal Husbandry		Achyutananda Mahananda; MLA from Kantabanji	14 June 1972	3 March 1973	SWA
Minister of State
Irrigation & Power		Damburu Majhi; MLA from Dabugam	14 June 1972	3 March 1973	SWA
Health & Family Welfare		Somanath Rath; MLA from Bhanjanagar	14 June 1972	3 March 1973	INC(R)
Supply		Bhagirathi Gomango; MLA from Gunupur	14 June 1972	3 March 1973	INC(R)
Agriculture; Co-operation		Gobinda Chandra Sethi; MLA from Nimapara	14 June 1972	3 March 1973	Utkal Congress
Community Development & Panchayati Raj		Krupasindhu Bhoi; MLA from Padampur	14 June 1972	3 March 1973	INC(R)
Deputy Minister
Rural Development		Bhajaman Behara; MLA from Chhendipada	14 June 1972	3 March 1973	Utkal Congress

== Members of Legislative Assembly ==
Source
District	AC. No.	Constituency	Winner Candidate	Party	Remarks
Mayurbhanj	1	Karanjia (ST)	Prafulla Kumar Das	Swatantra Party	
Mayurbhanj	2	Jashipur (ST)	Lal Mohan Nayak	Indian National Congress (R)	
Mayurbhanj	3	Rairangpur (ST)	Siddhalal Murmu	All India Jharkhand Party	
Mayurbhanj	4	Bahalda (ST)	Sashi Bhusan Marandi	All India Jharkhand Party	
Mayurbhanj	5	Bangriposi (ST)	Radha Mohan Nayak	Swatantra Party	
Mayurbhanj	6	Baripada	Pramoda Chandra Bhanjdeo	Independent	
Mayurbhanj	7	Muruda (ST)	Kuanria Majhi	Swatantra Party	
Mayurbhanj	8	Baisinga (ST)	Prasanna Kumar Dash	Praja Socialist Party	
Mayurbhanj	9	Khunta	Birabhadra Singh	Utkal Congress	
Mayurbhanj	10	Udala (ST)	Manmohan Tudu	Indian National Congress (R)	
Baleshwar	11	Bhograi	Kartikeswar Patra	Indian National Congress (R)	
Baleshwar	12	Jaleswar	Prasanta Kumar Pal	Praja Socialist Party	
Baleshwar	13	Basta	Chintamani Jena	Utkal Congress	
Baleshwar	14	Balasore	Priyanath Nandy	Indian National Congress (R)	
Baleshwar	15	Nilgiri	Banamali Das	Communist Party of India (Marxist)	
Baleshwar	16	Sore	Jadunath Das Mahapatra	Utkal Congress	
Baleshwar	17	Simulia (SC)	Chintamani Jena	Communist Party of India	
Baleshwar	18	Bhadrak	Harekrushna Mahatab	Indian National Congress (R)	Resigned as elected in two seats.
Baleshwar	18	Bhadrak	Balaram Sahoo	Utkal Congress	Elected in 1971 bypoll.
Baleshwar	19	Dhamnagar	Hrudananda Mallick	Utkal Congress	
Baleshwar	20	Chandabali (SC)	Gangadhar Das	Indian National Congress (R)	
Baleshwar	21	Basudebpur	Nilamani Routray	Utkal Congress	Deputy chief Minister
Cuttack	22	Sukinda	Sanatan Deo	Utkal Congress	
Cuttack	23	Dharmasala	Banka Bihari Das	Praja Socialist Party	
Cuttack	24	Barchana	Managobinda Samal	Utkal Congress	
Cuttack	25	Binjharpur	Pabitramohan Jena	Indian National Congress (R)	
Cuttack	26	Jajpur (West)	Prafulla Chandra Ghadei	Indian National Congress (R)	
Cuttack	27	Jajpur (East) (SC)	Jaganatha Mallick	Utkal Congress	
Cuttack	28	Aul	Sarat Kumar Deb	Swatantra Party	
Cuttack	29	Patamundai (SC)	Prahlad Mallik	Utkal Congress	
Cuttack	30	Rajanagar	Prahlad Mallik	Utkal Congress	Resigned as elected in two seats.
Cuttack	30	Rajanagar	Biju Patnaik	Utkal Congress	Elected in 1971 bypoll; Leader of Opposition
Cuttack	31	Kendrapara	Bhagabat Prasad Mohanty	Praja Socialist Party	
Cuttack	32	Patkura	Rajkishore Nayak	Utkal Congress	
Cuttack	33	Tirtol	Pratap Chandra Mohanty	Utkal Congress	
Cuttack	34	Ersama	Narayana Birabar Samanta	Utkal Congress	Deputy Speaker
Cuttack	35	Balikuda	Basudeba Mohapatra	Indian National Congress (R)	
Cuttack	36	Jagatsinghpur (SC)	Laxman Mallick	Indian National Congress (R)	
Cuttack	37	Gobindpur	Trilochan Kanungo	Indian National Congress (R)	
Cuttack	38	Salepur	Batakrushna Jena	Utkal Congress	
Cuttack	39	Mahanga	Sarat Kumar Kar	Utkal Congress	
Cuttack	40	Chowdwar	Kanhu Charan Lenka	Indian National Congress (R)	
Cuttack	41	Cuttack City	Bhairaba Chandra Mohanty	Indian National Congress (R)	Resigned.
Cuttack	41	Cuttack City	Nandini Satpathy	Indian National Congress (R)	Elected in 1972 bypoll; Chief Minister
Cuttack	42	Cuttack Sadar (SC)	Sura Sethi	Indian National Congress (R)	
Cuttack	43	Banki	Gokulananda Praharaj	Utkal Congress	
Cuttack	44	Athagarh	Radhanatha Rath	Independent	
Cuttack	45	Baramba	Trilochan Harichandan	Swatantra Party	
Puri	46	Bhubaneswar	Harekrushna Mahatab	Indian National Congress (R)	
Puri	47	Balipatna (SC)	Basanta Behera	Indian National Congress (R)	
Puri	48	Pipili	Abhimanyu Ran Singh	Indian National Congress (R)	
Puri	49	Nimapara (SC)	Govinda Chandra Sethi	Utkal Congress	
Puri	50	Kakatapur	Surendra Nath Naik	Utkal Congress	
Puri	51	Satyabadi	Chandramadhaba Mishra	Independent	
Puri	52	Puri	Braja Mohan Mohanty	Indian National Congress (R)	
Puri	53	Bramhagiri	Gopabandhu Patra	Indian National Congress (R)	
Puri	54	Banpur	Ramachandra Praharaja	Swatantra Party	
Puri	55	Khurda	Benudhar Baliarsing	Indian National Congress (R)	
Puri	56	Begunia	Gangadhara Paikaray	Communist Party of India	
Puri	57	Khandapara	Bansidhar Pattnaik	Independent	
Puri	58	Daspalla (SC)	Saheb Naik	Indian National Congress (R)	
Puri	59	Nayagarh	Achyutananda Mohanty	Utkal Congress	
Puri	60	Ranpur	Ramesh Chandra Panda	Communist Party of India (Marxist)	
Ganjam	61	Jaganathprasad (SC)	Bacha Naik	Indian National Congress (R)	
Ganjam	62	Bhanjanagar	Somanath Rath	Indian National Congress (R)	
Ganjam	63	Suruda	Ananta Narayan Singh Deo	Swatantra Party	
Ganjam	64	Aska	Krushna Chandra Tripathy	Utkal Congress	
Ganjam	65	Kabisuryanagar	Sadananda Mahanty	Communist Party of India	
Ganjam	66	Kodala	Ram Krushna Pattanaik	Utkal Congress	
Ganjam	67	Khallikote	Trinatha Samantra	Utkal Congress	
Ganjam	68	Chatrapur	Lakhmana Mahapatra	Communist Party of India	
Ganjam	69	Hinjili	Brundaban Naik	Utkal Congress	
Ganjam	70	Dura (SC)	Mohan Nayak	Indian National Congress (R)	
Ganjam	71	Berhampur	Binayak Acharya	Indian National Congress (R)	Leader of Opposition
Ganjam	72	Chikati	Satchidananda Deo	Indian National Congress (R)	
Ganjam	73	Mohana (ST)	Bhimasena Mandal	Indian National Congress (R)	
Ganjam	74	Ramagiri (ST)	Gorosang Soboro	Indian National Congress (R)	
Ganjam	75	Paralakhemundi	Darapu Latchanna Naidu	Swatantra Party	
Koraput	76	Gunupur (ST)	Bhagirathi Gomango	Indian National Congress (R)	
Koraput	77	Bissam Cuttack (ST)	Sripathi Praska	Swatantra Party	
Koraput	78	Rayagada (ST)	Raghunatha Himirika	Indian National Congress (R)	
Koraput	79	Narayanpatna (ST)	Jogi Tadingi	Indian National Congress (R)	
Koraput	80	Nandapur (ST)	Sanu Disari	Utkal Congress	
Koraput	81	Malkangiri (ST)	Gangadhar Madhi	Indian National Congress (R)	
Koraput	82	Jeypore	Pratap Narayan Singh Deo	Swatantra Party	
Koraput	83	Kotpad (ST)	Dhansai Randhari	Swatantra Party	
Koraput	84	Nowrangpur	Habibulla Khan	Swatantra Party	
Koraput	85	Kodinga (SC)	Purno Chandramirgan	Utkal Congress	
Koraput	86	Dabugam (ST)	Dombaru Majhi	Swatantra Party	
Koraput	87	Umarkote (ST)	Rabisingh Majhi	Utkal Congress	
Kalahandi	88	Nawapara (ST)	Ghasiram Majhi	Swatantra Party	
Kalahandi	89	Khariar	Anupa Singh Deo	Indian National Congress (Organization)	
Kalahandi	90	Dharmagarh (SC)	Lochan Dhangada Majhi	Swatantra Party	
Kalahandi	91	Koksara	Birakesari Deo	Swatantra Party	Resigned.
Kalahandi	91	Koksara	Raghunath Praharaj	Swatantra Party	Elected in 1971 bypoll.
Kalahandi	92	Junagarh	Trinath Sorab	Swatantra Party	
Kalahandi	93	Bhawanipatna (SC)	Dayanidhi Nayak	Swatantra Party	
Kalahandi	94	Narla (ST)	Dhaneswar Majhi	Swatantra Party	
Kalahandi	95	Kesinga	Bhagaban Bhoi	Swatantra Party	
Phulbani	96	Udayagiri (ST)	Gopal Pradhan	Swatantra Party	
Phulbani	97	Balliguda (ST)	Naresh Pradhan	Swatantra Party	
Phulbani	98	Phulbani (ST)	Jagadish Jani	Indian National Congress (R)	
Phulbani	99	Baudh	Natabar Pradhan	Swatantra Party	
Balangir	100	Sonepur	Nilambar Raiguru	Swatantra Party	
Balangir	101	Binka	Narasingha Mishra	Swatantra Party	
Balangir	102	Tusra	Radhamohan Mishra	Swatantra Party	
Balangir	103	Bolangir	Rajendra Narayan Singh Deo	Swatantra Party	Leader of Opposition
Balangir	104	Loisinga	Nandakishore Misra	Swatantra Party	Speaker
Balangir	105	Patnagarh	Ainthu Sahoo	Swatantra Party	
Balangir	106	Saintala	Ramesh Chandra Singh Bhoi	Swatantra Party	
Balangir	107	Titilagarh (SC)	Tapi Jal	Swatantra Party	
Balangir	108	Kantabanji (SC)	Achyutananda Mahananda	Swatantra Party	
Sambalpur	109	Padampur	Krupasindhu Bhoi	Indian National Congress (R)	
Sambalpur	110	Melchhamunda	Birendra Kumar Sahu	Swatantra Party	
Sambalpur	111	Bijepur (SC)	Tribikram Mallick	Indian National Congress (R)	
Sambalpur	112	Bhatli	Kunja Bihari Naik	Indian National Congress (R)	
Sambalpur	113	Bargarh	Chittaranjan Kar	Indian National Congress (R)	
Sambalpur	114	Sambalpur	Sriballav Panigrahi	Indian National Congress (R)	
Sambalpur	115	Brajarajnagar	Upendra Dikshit	Indian National Congress (R)	
Sambalpur	116	Jharsuguda	Jhashaketan Sahu	Indian National Congress (R)	
Sambalpur	117	Laikera (ST)	Rameshwar Naik	Indian National Congress (R)	
Sambalpur	118	Kuchinda (ST)	Jagateswar Mirdha	Indian National Congress (R)	
Sambalpur	119	Rairakhol (SC)	Abhimanyu Kumbhar	Indian National Congress (R)	
Sambalpur	120	Deogarh	Bhanuganga Tribhuban Deb	Swatantra Party	
Sundargarh	121	Sundargarh	Dibyalochan Sekhar Deo	Indian National Congress (R)	
Sundargarh	122	Talsara (ST)	Gangadhar Pradhan	Swatantra Party	
Sundargarh	123	Rajgangpur (ST)	Ignace Majhi	All India Jharkhand Party	
Sundargarh	124	Bisra (ST)	Kullan Bag	All India Jharkhand Party	
Sundargarh	125	Rourkela	Shyam Sundar Mohapatra	Indian National Congress (R)	Resigned.
Sundargarh	125	Rourkela	Biswanath Das	Independent	Elected in 1971 bypoll; Chief Minister
Sundargarh	126	Bonai (ST)	Hemendra Prasad Mahapatra	Swatantra Party	
Keonjhar	127	Champua (ST)	Saharai Oram	Utkal Congress	
Keonjhar	128	Patna (ST)	Maheswar Majhi	Utkal Congress	
Keonjhar	129	Keonjhar (ST)	Chhotaray Majhi	Utkal Congress	
Keonjhar	130	Telkori (ST)	Niladri Nayak	Utkal Congress	
Keonjhar	131	Ramachandrapur	Muralidhar Kuanr	Indian National Congress (R)	
Keonjhar	132	Anandpur (SC)	Makar Sethi	Indian National Congress (R)	
Dhenkanal	133	Pallahara	Narayana Sahu	Indian National Congress (R)	
Dhenkanal	134	Kamakhyanagar	Bramhananda Biswal	Indian National Congress (R)	
Dhenkanal	135	Gondia	Brundaban Tripathy	Indian National Congress (R)	
Dhenkanal	136	Dhenkanal	Surendra Mohan Pattanaik	Indian National Congress (R)	
Dhenkanal	137	Talcher (SC)	Brundaban Behera	Orissa Jana Congress	
Dhenkanal	138	Chhendipada (SC)	Bhajaman Behera	Utkal Congress	
Dhenkanal	139	Angul	Debaraja Sahu	Utkal Congress	
Dhenkanal	140	Athamallik	Raja Kishore Pradhan	Utkal Congress	

== Bypolls ==
Source
Year	Constituency	Reason for by-poll	Winning candidate	Party
September 1971	Bhadrak	Resignation of Harekrushna Mahatab	Balaram Sahoo	Utkal Congress
September 1971	Rajanagar	Resignation of Prahlad Mallik	Biju Patnaik	Utkal Congress
September 1971	Koksara	Resignation of Birakesari Deo	Raghunath Praharaj	Swatantra Party
September 1971	Rourkela	Resignation of Shyam Sundar Mohapatra	Bishwanath Das	Independent
November 1972	Cuttack City	Resignation of Bhairaba Chandra Mohanty	Nandini Satpathy	Indian National Congress (R)
