= List of leaders of the opposition in the Odisha Legislative Assembly =

Leader of the opposition in Odisha's unicameral legislature

Leader of the Opposition of the Odisha Legislative Assembly
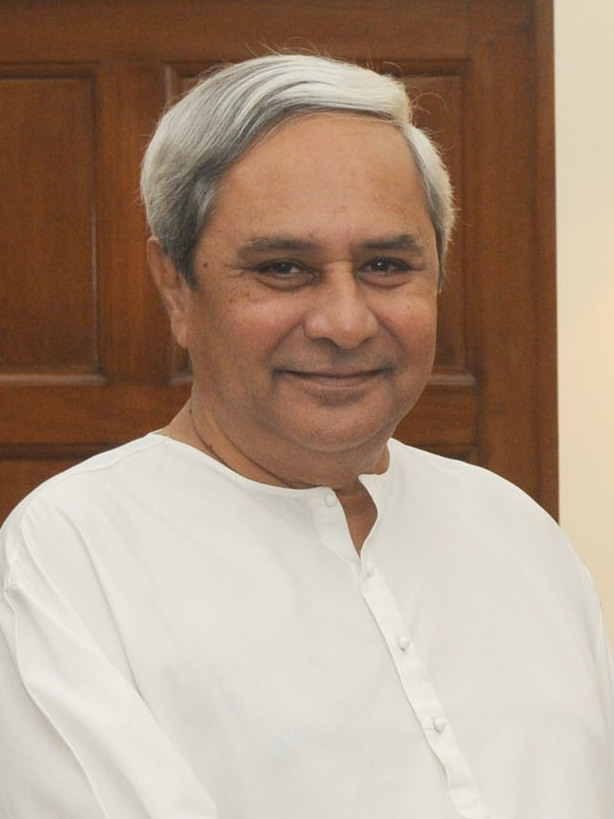
- Incumbent; Naveen Patnaik since 19 June 2024
- Odisha Legislative Assembly
- Style: Honourable Leader of Opposition
- Member of: Odisha Legislative Assembly
- Residence: Naveen Niwas, Bhubaneswar
- Seat: Office of the Leader of Opposition, Odisha Legislative Assembly
- Nominator: Members of the Official Opposition Party of the Odisha Legislative Assembly
- Appointer: Speaker of the Assembly
- Term length: Duration of the Assembly i.e. 5 years
- Inaugural holder: Shraddhakar Supakar
- Deputy: Prasanna Acharya
- Salary: ₹97,000 (US$1,000)/monthly; ₹1,164,000 (US$12,000)/annually

The leader of the opposition in the Odisha Legislative Assembly is the politician who leads the official opposition in the Odisha Legislative Assembly.

== Eligibility ==
Official Opposition is a term used to designate the political party which has secured the second largest number of seats in the assembly. In order to get formal recognition, the party must have at least 10% of total membership of the Legislative Assembly. A single party has to meet the 10% seat criterion, not an alliance. Many of the Indian state legislatures also follow this 10% rule while the rest prefer single largest opposition party according to the rules of their respective houses.

== List of Leaders of Opposition ==
#	Portrait	Name (lifespan) Constituency	Tenure			Chief Minister	Assembly (Election)	Party
1		Shraddhakar Supakar (1914–1993); MLA from Rairakhol	16 February 1952	4 March 1957	5 years, 16 days	Nabakrushna Choudhuri	1st (1952)	All India Ganatantra Parishad
2		Rajendra Narayan Singh Deo (1912–1975); MLA from Titlagarh	1 April 1957	22 May 1959	2 years, 51 days	Nabakrushna Choudhuri Harekrushna Mahatab	2nd (1957)	All India Ganatantra Parishad
President's rule was imposed in during the period (25 February – 23 June 1961)
(2)		Rajendra Narayan Singh Deo (1912–1975); MLA from Kantabanji	21 June 1961	1 March 1967	5 years, 253 days	Biju Patnaik Biren Mitra Sadashiva Tripathy	3rd (1961)	All India Ganatantra Parishad
3		Sadashiva Tripathy (1910–1980); MLA from Nowrangpur	18 March 1967	11 January 1971	3 years, 311 days	Rajendra Narayan Singh Deo	4th (1967)	Indian National Congress
President's rule was imposed in during the period (11 January – 3 April 1971)
4		Binayak Acharya (1918–1983); MLA from Berhampur	4 May 1971	14 June 1972	1 year, 41 days	Bishwanath Das	5th (1971)	Indian National Congress
(2)		Rajendra Narayan Singh Deo (1912–1975); MLA from Bolangir	14 June 1972	9 February 1973	240 days	Nandini Satpathy	5th (1971)	Swatantra Party
5		Biju Patnaik (1916–1997); MLA from Rajanagar	9 February 1973	3 March 1973	22 days	Nandini Satpathy	5th (1971)	Utkal Congress
President's rule was imposed in during the period (3 March 1973 – 6 March 1974)
(5)		Biju Patnaik (1916–1997); MLA from Rajanagar	19 March 1974	10 December 1974	266 days	Nandini Satpathy	6th (1974)	Utkal Congress
(5)		Biju Patnaik (1916–1997); MLA from Rajanagar	10 December 1974	16 December 1976	2 years, 6 days	Nandini Satpathy	6th (1974)	Bharatiya Lok Dal
President's rule was imposed in during the period (16 December – 29 December 1976)
(5)		Biju Patnaik (1916–1997); MLA from Rajanagar	30 December 1976	24 March 1977	84 days	Binayak Acharya	6th (1974)	Bharatiya Lok Dal
6		Ram Prasad Mishra (1920–2014); MLA from Kantabanji	31 March 1977	30 April 1977	30 days	Binayak Acharya	6th (1974)	Janata Party
President's rule was imposed in during the period (30 April – 26 June 1977)
7		Chintamani Panigrahi (1922–2000); MLA from Begunia	29 June 1977	20 February 1978	236 days	Nilamani Routray	7th (1977)	Indian National Congress (R)
8		Brundaban Nayak (1912–1984); MLA from Hinjili	20 February 1978	3 September 1979	1 year, 195 days	Nilamani Routray	7th (1977)	Indian National Congress (I)
9		Prahlad Mallik (1929–1990); MLA from Patkura	3 September 1979	13 February 1980	163 days	Nilamani Routray	7th (1977)	Orissa Janata Party
10		Ananta Narayan Singh Deo (1929–2003); MLA from Surada	13 February 1980	17 February 1980	4 days	Nilamani Routray	7th (1977)	Janata Party
President's rule was imposed in during the period (17 February – 9 June 1980)
-	Vacant (Note: No party was able to secure 10% of the assembly strength i.e. 14 Seats)		9 June 1980	1 April 1984	3 years, 297 days	Janaki Ballabh Patnaik	8th (1980)	No Official Opposition
11		Sarat Kumar Deb (1944–1988); MLA from Aul	2 April 1984	10 March 1985	342 days	Janaki Ballabh Patnaik	8th (1980)	Janata Party (Secular)
(5)		Biju Patnaik (1916–1997); MLA from Bhubaneswar	22 March 1985	3 March 1990	4 years, 346 days	Janaki Ballabh Patnaik Hemananda Biswal	9th (1985)	Janata Party
-	Vacant (Note: No party was able to secure 10% of the assembly strength i.e. 14 Seats)		5 March 1990	15 March 1995	5 years, 10 days	Biju Patnaik	10th (1990)	No Official Opposition
(5)		Biju Patnaik (1916–1997); MLA from Bhubaneswar	23 March 1995	20 May 1996	1 year, 58 days	Janaki Ballabh Patnaik Giridhar Gamang Hemananda Biswal	11th (1995)	Janata Dal
12		Ashok Kumar Das (1942–2008); MLA from Korei	22 May 1996	17 December 1997	1 year, 209 days	Janaki Ballabh Patnaik Giridhar Gamang Hemananda Biswal	11th (1995)	Janata Dal
13		Ram Krushna Patnaik (1940–2021); MLA from Kodala	22 February 1998	16 November 1998	267 days	Janaki Ballabh Patnaik Giridhar Gamang Hemananda Biswal	11th (1995)	Biju Janata Dal
14		Prafulla Samal (born 1947); MLA from Bhadrak	16 November 1998	1 December 1998	15 days	Janaki Ballabh Patnaik Giridhar Gamang Hemananda Biswal	11th (1995)	Biju Janata Dal
15		Satchidananda Dalal (born 1941); MLA from Boudh	11 December 1998	29 February 2000	1 year, 80 days	Janaki Ballabh Patnaik Giridhar Gamang Hemananda Biswal	11th (1995)	Biju Janata Dal
16		Ramakanta Mishra (born 1944); MLA from Ranpur	21 March 2000	6 February 2004	3 years, 322 days	Naveen Patnaik	12th (2000)	Indian National Congress
17		Janaki Ballabh Patnaik (1927–2015); MLA from Begunia	4 June 2004	24 January 2009	4 years, 234 days	Naveen Patnaik	13th (2004)	Indian National Congress
18		Ramachandra Ulaka (1935–2011); MLA from Rayagada	24 January 2009	19 May 2009	115 days	Naveen Patnaik	13th (2004)	Indian National Congress
19		Bhupinder Singh (born 1951); MLA from Narla	27 May 2009	10 March 2014	4 years, 287 days	Naveen Patnaik	14th (2009)	Indian National Congress
20		Narasingha Mishra (born 1940); MLA from Bolangir	11 June 2014	29 May 2019	4 years, 352 days	Naveen Patnaik	15th (2014)	Indian National Congress
21		Pradipta Kumar Naik (born 1966); MLA from Bhawanipatna	25 June 2019	30 July 2022	3 years, 35 days	Naveen Patnaik	16th (2019)	Bharatiya Janata Party
22		Jayanarayan Mishra (born 1963); MLA from Sambalpur	30 July 2022	4 June 2024	1 year, 310 days	Naveen Patnaik	16th (2019)	Bharatiya Janata Party
23		Naveen Patnaik (born 1946); MLA from Hinjili	19 June 2024	Incumbent	2 years, 80 days	Mohan Charan Majhi	17th (2024)	Biju Janata Dal

== Statistics ==
Time held in office by party
1. Indian National Congress (34.0%)
2. All India Ganatantra Parishad (18.6%)
3. Janata Party (7.29%)
4. Bharatiya Janata Party (7.15%)
5. Biju Janata Dal (5.71%)
6. Janata Dal (3.95%)
7. Bharatiya Lok Dal (3.25%)
8. Indian National Congress (I) (2.22%)
9. Janata Party (Secular) (1.35%)
10. Utkal Congress (1.14%)
11. Swatantra Party (0.95%)
12. Indian National Congress (R) (0.93%)
13. Orissa Janata Party (0.65%)
14. No Official Opposition (12.8%)

#	Leader of Opposition	Party	Term of office	
#	Leader of Opposition	Party	Longest term	Total duration
1	Biju Patnaik	BLD/JP/JD/UC	4 years, 346 days	9 years, 52 days
2	Rajendra Narayan Singh Deo	AIGP/SWP	5 years, 253 days	8 years, 179 days
3	Shraddhakar Supakar	AIGP	5 years, 16 days	5 years, 16 days
4	Narasingha Mishra	INC	4 years, 352 days	4 years, 352 days
5	Bhupinder Singh	INC	4 years, 287 days	4 years, 287 days
6	Janaki Ballabh Patnaik	INC	4 years, 234 days	4 years, 234 days
7	Ramakanta Mishra	INC	3 years, 322 days	3 years, 322 days
8	Sadashiva Tripathy	INC	3 years, 299 days	3 years, 299 days
9	Pradipta Kumar Naik	BJP	3 years, 35 days	3 years, 35 days
10	Naveen Patnaik	BJD	1 years, 350 days	1 years, 350 days
11	Jayanarayan Mishra	BJP	1 years, 309 days	1 years, 309 days
12	Ashok Kumar Das	JD	1 year, 209 days	1 year, 209 days
13	Brundaban Nayak	INC(I)	1 year, 195 days	1 year, 195 days
14	Satchidananda Dalal	BJD	1 years, 80 days	1 years, 80 days
15	Binayak Acharya	INC	1 year, 41 days	1 year, 41 days
16	Sarat Kumar Deb	JP(S)	342 days	342 days
17	Ram Krushna Patnaik	BJD	267 days	267 days
18	Chintamani Panigrahi	INC(R)	236 days	236 days
19	Prahlad Mallik	OJP	163 days	163 days
20	Ramachandra Ulaka	INC	115 days	115 days
21	Ram Prasad Mishra	JP	30 days	30 days
22	Prafulla Samal	BJD	15 days	15 days
23	Ananta Narayan Singh Deo	JP	4 days	4 days
—	No Official Opposition (Note: No party was able to secure 10% of the assembly strength i.e. 15 Seats)	—	8 years, 306 days	

== See also ==
- Government of Odisha
- Governor of Odisha
- Chief Minister of Odisha
- Deputy Chief Ministers of Odisha
- Speaker of the Odisha Legislative Assembly
- Odisha Legislative Assembly
- Elections in Odisha
- Politics of Odisha
- List of current Indian opposition leaders
