= Odisha Legislative Assembly =

Unicameral state legislature of the Indian state of Odisha

Odisha Legislative Assembly Odishā Bidhāna Sabhā
- 17th Odisha Assembly
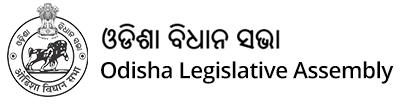

Type
- Type: Unicameral
- Term limits: 5 years

History
- Founded: 20 February 1952 (74 years ago)
- Preceded by: Orissa Provincial Assembly

Leadership
- Governor: Braj Mohan Ram since 18 October 2026
- Speaker: Surama Padhy, BJP since 20 June 2024
- Deputy Speaker: Bhabani Shankar Bhoi, BJP since 24 July 2024
- Chief Minister (Leader of the House): Mohan Charan Majhi, BJP since 12 June 2024
- Deputy Chief Minister (Deputy Leader of the House): Kanak Vardhan Singh Deo, BJP; Pravati Parida, BJP since 12 June 2024
- Leader of Opposition: Naveen Patnaik, BJD since 20 June 2024
- Secretary: Satyabrata Rout, IAS since 31 January 2025

Structure
- Seats: 147
- Political groups: Government (82): BJP (79); IND (3); Opposition (65): BJD (50) (Note: Following the March 2026 Rajya Sabha election, the Biju Janata Dal (BJD) and the Indian National Congress (INC) suspended 8 and 3 of their respective MLAs for alleged cross-voting and filed petitions seeking their disqualification under the Tenth Schedule. On 19 June 2026, Assembly Speaker Surama Padhy dismissed all 11 petitions under Rule 7(2) of the Members of Odisha Legislative Assembly (Disqualification on Ground of Defection) Rules, 1987, citing procedural deficiencies. The BJD subsequently challenged this decision in the Orissa High Court. On 29 October 2026, the High Court issued notices to the Speaker and five of the BJD MLAs, seeking their responses by 4 December 2026, with the next hearing scheduled for 11 January 2027. Consequently, the legislators maintain their full legislative seats under their original party affiliations.); INC (14); CPI(M) (1)

Elections
- Voting system: First-past-the-post voting
- Last election: 2024
- Next election: 2029

Meeting place
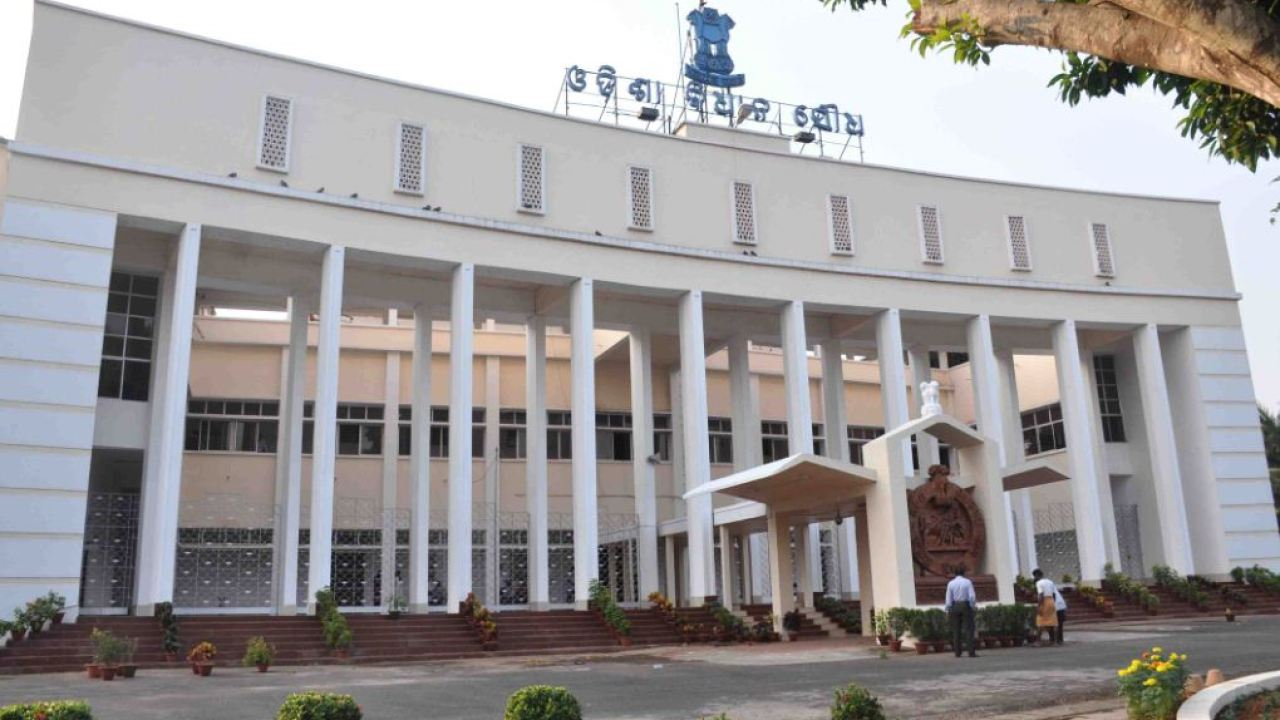
- Odisha Bidhana Saudha, Bhubaneswar, Odisha

Website
- assembly.odisha.gov.in

The Odisha Legislative Assembly is the unicameral state legislature of the state of Odisha in India. The seat of the Legislative Assembly is at Bhubaneswar, the capital city. The Legislative Assembly comprises 147 Members of Legislative Assembly. Out of total 147 Assembly Constituencies of Odisha Legislative Assembly, 33 seats are reserved for Scheduled Tribes (ST) and 24 seats for the Scheduled Castes (SC).

== History ==
The modern legislature of Odisha originated under the Government of India Act 1935, which established a unicameral 60-member provincial assembly for the newly formed Orissa Province in 1937. Following Indian independence and the integration of the former princely states (the Garhjat states) between 1948 and 1949, the strength of the Second Provincial Assembly was increased from 60 to 91 members.

Upon the commencement of the Constitution of India and ahead of the first general election in 1951–52, the strength of the Odisha Legislative Assembly was fixed at 140 seats. Following the 1973 delimitation exercise prior to the 1974 assembly election, the total strength of the house was increased to 147 seats, where it remains today.

Historical terms of the Odisha Legislative Assembly
No.	Assembly (Election)	Constitution	Dissolution	Initial composition (Note: The First Provincial Assembly had a total strength of 60 members. The Second Provincial Assembly initially comprised 60 members in 1946 and was expanded to 91 members in 1949 following the merger of the princely states. From the First to the Fifth Assembly, the total strength was 140 members; from the Sixth Assembly onwards, the total strength has been 147 members. Seat counts reflect party standings at the commencement of each assembly unless otherwise noted.)	Speaker(s)	Chief Minister(s) (Note: From 1 April 1937 until 26 January 1950, the head of the provincial government was officially designated as Prime Minister (Premier) of Orissa.)	Leader(s) of the Opposition
A	1st Provincial (1937)	3 February 1937	14 September 1945	INC (36); United Party (6); National Party (4); IND (6); No Party (4); Nominated (4)	Mukunda Prasad Das	Krushna Chandra Gajapati; Bishwanath Das	N/A
B	2nd Provincial (1946)	18 April 1946	20 February 1952	INC (47); AIML (4); CPI (1); IND (4); Nominated (4); Merged States / No Party – 31	Lal Mohan Patnaik	Harekrushna Mahatab; Nabakrushna Choudhuri	N/A
1	1st Assembly (1952)	20 February 1952	4 March 1957	INC (67); AIGP (31); SP (10); CPI (7); AIFB (1); IND (24)	Nanda Kishore Das	Nabakrushna Choudhuri; Harekrushna Mahatab	Shraddhakar Supakar
2	2nd Assembly (1957)	1 April 1957	25 February 1961	INC (56); AIGP (51); PSP (11); CPI (9); IND (13)	Nilakantha Das	Harekrushna Mahatab	Rajendra Narayan Singh Deo
3	3rd Assembly (1961)	21 June 1961	1 March 1967	INC (82); AIGP (37); PSP (10); CPI (4); IND (7)	Lingaraj Panigrahi	Biju Patnaik; Biren Mitra; Sadashiva Tripathy	Rajendra Narayan Singh Deo
4	4th Assembly (1967)	1 March 1967	23 January 1971	SWP (49); INC (31); OJC (26); PSP (21); CPI (7); SSP (2); CPI(M) (2); IND (3)	Nandakishore Mishra	Rajendra Narayan Singh Deo	Sadashiva Tripathy
5	5th Assembly (1971)	23 March 1971	3 March 1973	INC(R) (51); SWP (36); UC (33); PSP (4); CPI (4); JAP (4); CPI(M) (2); INC(O) (1); OJC (1); IND (4)	Nandakishore Mishra	Bishwanath Das; Nandini Satpathy	Binayak Acharya; Rajendra Narayan Singh Deo; Biju Patnaik
6	6th Assembly (1974)	6 March 1974	30 April 1977	INC(R) (69); UC (35); SWP (21); CPI (7); CPI(M) (3); SP (2); OJC (1); JAP (1); IND (7)	Brajamohan Mohanty	Nandini Satpathy; Binayak Acharya	Biju Patnaik; Ram Prasad Mishra
7	7th Assembly (1977)	26 June 1977	17 February 1980	JP (110); INC(R) (26); CPI (1); CPI(M) (1); IND (9)	Satyapriya Mohanty	Nilamani Routray	Chintamani Panigrahi; Brundaban Nayak; Prahlad Mallik; Ananta Narayan Singh Deo
8	8th Assembly (1980)	9 June 1980	9 March 1985	INC(I) (118); JP(S) (13); CPI (4); JP (3); INC(U) (2); IND (7)	Somnath Rath; Prasanna Kumar Dash	Janaki Ballabh Patnaik	Vacant (1980–1984); Sarat Kumar Deb
9	9th Assembly (1985)	9 March 1985	3 March 1990	INC (117); JP (21); BJP (1); CPI (1); IND (7)	Prasanna Kumar Dash	Janaki Ballabh Patnaik; Hemananda Biswal	Biju Patnaik
10	10th Assembly (1990)	3 March 1990	15 March 1995	JD (123); INC (10); CPI (5); BJP (2); CPI(M) (1); IND (6)	Yudhistir Das	Biju Patnaik	N/A
11	11th Assembly (1995)	15 March 1995	29 February 2000	INC (80); JD (46); BJP (9); JMM (4); CPI (1); JPP (1); IND (6)	Kishore Chandra Patel; Chintamani Dyan Samantra	Janaki Ballabh Patnaik; Giridhar Gamang; Hemananda Biswal	Biju Patnaik; Ashok Kumar Das; Ram Krushna Patnaik; Prafulla Samal; Satchidananda Dalal
12	12th Assembly (2000)	29 February 2000	6 February 2004	BJD (68); BJP (38); INC (26); JMM (3); CPI (1); CPI(M) (1); JD(S) (1); AITC (1); IND (8)	Sarat Kumar Kar	Naveen Patnaik	Ramakanta Mishra
13	13th Assembly (2004)	15 May 2004	19 May 2009	BJD (61); INC (38); BJP (32); JMM (4); OGP (2); CPI (1); CPI(M) (1); IND (8)	Maheswar Mohanty; Prahlad Dora (Acting); Kishore Kumar Mohanty	Naveen Patnaik	Janaki Ballabh Patnaik; Ramachandra Ulaka
14	14th Assembly (2009)	19 May 2009	24 May 2014	BJD (103); INC (27); BJP (6); NCP (4); CPI (1); IND (6)	Pradip Kumar Amat	Naveen Patnaik	Bhupinder Singh
15	15th Assembly (2014)	25 May 2014	29 May 2019	BJD (117); INC (16); BJP (10); CPI(M) (1); SKD (1); IND (2)	Niranjan Pujari; Pradip Kumar Amat	Naveen Patnaik	Narasingha Mishra
16	16th Assembly (2019)	30 May 2019	3 June 2024	BJD (113); BJP (23); INC (9); CPI(M) (1); IND (1)	Surjya Narayan Patro; Bikram Keshari Arukha; Pramila Mallik	Naveen Patnaik	Pradipta Kumar Naik; Jayanarayan Mishra
17	17th Assembly (2024)	5 June 2024	Incumbent	BJP (78) (Note: Increased to 79 seats following the BJP's victory in the November 2025 Nuapada by-election.); BJD (51) (Note: Decreased to 50 seats following the death of Nuapada MLA Rajendra Dholakia in September 2025 and the subsequent by-election loss.); INC (14); CPI(M) (1); IND (3)	Surama Padhy	Mohan Charan Majhi	Naveen Patnaik

== Current office bearers ==
Current Office bearers of the Odisha Legislative Assembly
Position	Portrait	Name Constituency	Took office	Time in office	Party
Governor		Braj Mohan Ram	18 October 2026	16 days	None N/A
Speaker		Surama Padhy; MLA for Ranapur	20 June 2024	2 years, 4 months and 14 days	BJP
Deputy Speaker		Bhabani Shankar Bhoi; MLA for Talasara	24 July 2024	2 years, 3 months and 10 days	BJP
Leader of the House (Chief Minister)		Mohan Charan Majhi; MLA for Kendujhar	12 June 2024	2 years, 4 months and 22 days	BJP
Deputy Leader of the House (Deputy Chief Minister)		Kanak Vardhan Singh Deo; MLA for Patnagad	12 June 2024	2 years, 4 months and 22 days	BJP
Deputy Leader of the House (Deputy Chief Minister)		Pravati Parida; MLA for Nimapada	12 June 2024	2 years, 4 months and 22 days	BJP
Minister for Parliamentary Affairs		Mukesh Mahaling; MLA for Loisingha	12 June 2024	2 years, 4 months and 22 days	BJP
Government Chief Whip		Saroj Kumar Pradhan; MLA for Boudh	22 July 2024	2 years, 3 months and 12 days	BJP
Government Deputy Chief Whip		Gobinda Chandra Das; MLA for Remuna	22 July 2024	2 years, 3 months and 12 days	BJP
Leader of the Opposition		Naveen Patnaik; MLA for Hinjili	20 June 2024	2 years, 4 months and 14 days	BJD
Deputy Leader of the Opposition		Prasanna Acharya; MLA for Redhakhol	20 June 2024	2 years, 4 months and 14 days	BJD
Opposition Chief Whip		Pramila Mallik; MLA for Binjharpur	24 June 2024	2 years, 4 months and 10 days	BJD
Opposition Deputy Chief Whip		Pratap Keshari Deb; MLA for Aali	24 June 2024	2 years, 4 months and 10 days	BJD
Leader of Congress Legislature Party		Rama Chandra Kadam; MLA for Pattangi	21 July 2024	2 years, 3 months and 13 days	INC
Deputy Leader of Congress Legislature Party		Ashok Das; MLA for Basudebapur	21 July 2024	2 years, 3 months and 13 days	INC
Congress Chief Whip		C. S. Raazen Ekka; MLA for Rajagangpur	21 July 2024	2 years, 3 months and 13 days	INC

== Current Members of Legislative Assembly ==
Source
District	Ac. No.	Constituency	Name	Party	Remarks
Bargarh	1	Padampur	Barsha Singh Bariha	Biju Janata Dal	
Bargarh	2	Bijepur	Sanat Kumar Gartia	Bharatiya Janata Party	
Bargarh	3	Bargarh	Ashwini Kumar Sarangi	Bharatiya Janata Party	
Bargarh	4	Attabira (SC)	Nihar Ranjan Mahanand	Bharatiya Janata Party	
Bargarh	5	Bhatli	Irasis Acharya	Bharatiya Janata Party	
Jharsuguda	6	Brajarajnagar	Suresh Pujari	Bharatiya Janata Party	Cabinet Minister
Jharsuguda	7	Jharsuguda	Tankadhar Tripathy	Bharatiya Janata Party	
Sundargarh	8	Talsara (ST)	Bhabani Shankar Bhoi	Bharatiya Janata Party	Deputy Speaker
Sundargarh	9	Sundargarh (ST)	Jogesh Kumar Singh	Biju Janata Dal	
Sundargarh	10	Biramitrapur (ST)	Rohit Joseph Tirkey	Biju Janata Dal	
Sundargarh	11	Raghunathpali (SC)	Durga Charan Tanti	Bharatiya Janata Party	
Sundargarh	12	Rourkela	Sarada Prashad Nayak	Biju Janata Dal	
Sundargarh	13	Rajgangpur (ST)	C. S. Raazen Ekka	Indian National Congress	Chief Whip, Congress
Sundargarh	14	Bonai (ST)	Laxman Munda	Communist Party of India (Marxist)	
Sambalpur	15	Kuchinda (ST)	Rabi Narayan Naik	Bharatiya Janata Party	Cabinet Minister
Sambalpur	16	Rengali (SC)	Sudarshan Haripal	Biju Janata Dal	
Sambalpur	17	Sambalpur	Jayanarayan Mishra	Bharatiya Janata Party	
Sambalpur	18	Rairakhol	Prasanna Acharya	Biju Janata Dal	Deputy Leader of Opposition
Deogarh	19	Deogarh	Romanch Ranjan Biswal	Biju Janata Dal	
Keonjhar	20	Telkoi (ST)	Fakir Mohan Naik	Bharatiya Janata Party	
Keonjhar	21	Ghasipura	Badri Narayan Patra	Biju Janata Dal	
Keonjhar	22	Anandpur (SC)	Abhimanyu Sethi	Biju Janata Dal	
Keonjhar	23	Patna (ST)	Akhila Chandra Naik	Bharatiya Janata Party	
Keonjhar	24	Keonjhar (ST)	Mohan Charan Majhi	Bharatiya Janata Party	Chief Minister
Keonjhar	25	Champua	Sanatan Mahakud	Biju Janata Dal	Suspended from Party for Anti Party Activities
Mayurbhanj	26	Jashipur (ST)	Ganesh Ram Singh Khuntia	Bharatiya Janata Party	Minister of State (I/C)
Mayurbhanj	27	Saraskana (ST)	Bhadav Hansdah	Bharatiya Janata Party	
Mayurbhanj	28	Rairangpur (ST)	Jalen Naik	Bharatiya Janata Party	
Mayurbhanj	29	Bangriposi (ST)	Sanjali Murmu	Bharatiya Janata Party	
Mayurbhanj	30	Karanjia (ST)	Padma Charan Haiburu	Bharatiya Janata Party	
Mayurbhanj	31	Udala (ST)	Bhaskar Madhei	Bharatiya Janata Party	
Mayurbhanj	32	Badasahi (SC)	Sanatan Bijuli	Bharatiya Janata Party	
Mayurbhanj	33	Baripada (ST)	Prakash Soren	Bharatiya Janata Party	
Mayurbhanj	34	Morada	Krushna Chandra Mohapatra	Bharatiya Janata Party	Cabinet Minister
Balasore	35	Jaleswar	Aswini Kumar Patra	Biju Janata Dal	
Balasore	36	Bhograi	Goutam Buddha Das	Biju Janata Dal	
Balasore	37	Basta	Subasini Jena	Biju Janata Dal	Suspended from Party for cross voting in 2026 RS election
Balasore	38	Balasore	Manas Kumar Dutta	Bharatiya Janata Party	
Balasore	39	Remuna (SC)	Gobinda Chandra Das	Bharatiya Janata Party	Deputy Govt. Chief Whip
Balasore	40	Nilagiri	Santosh Khatua	Bharatiya Janata Party	
Balasore	41	Soro (SC)	Madhab Dhada	Biju Janata Dal	
Balasore	42	Simulia	Padma Lochan Panda	Bharatiya Janata Party	
Bhadrak	43	Bhandaripokhari	Sanjib Kumar Mallick	Biju Janata Dal	
Bhadrak	44	Bhadrak	Sitansu Sekhar Mohapatra	Bharatiya Janata Party	
Bhadrak	45	Basudevpur	Ashok Kumar Das	Indian National Congress	Deputy Leader of Congress Legislature Party
Bhadrak	46	Dhamnagar (SC)	Suryabanshi Suraj	Bharatiya Janata Party	Minister of State (I/C)
Bhadrak	47	Chandabali	Byomakesh Ray	Biju Janata Dal	
Jajpur	48	Binjharpur (SC)	Pramila Mallik	Biju Janata Dal	Chief Whip, BJD
Jajpur	49	Bari	Biswa Ranjan Mallick	Biju Janata Dal	
Jajpur	50	Barchana	Amar Kumar Nayak	Bharatiya Janata Party	
Jajpur	51	Dharmasala	Himanshu Sekhar Sahoo	Independent	Supports Bharatiya Janata Party
Jajpur	52	Jajpur	Sujata Sahu	Biju Janata Dal	
Jajpur	53	Korei	Akash Dasnayak	Bharatiya Janata Party	
Jajpur	54	Sukinda	Pradeep Bal Samanta	Bharatiya Janata Party	Minister of State (I/C)
Dhenkanal	55	Dhenkanal	Krushna Chandra Patra	Bharatiya Janata Party	Cabinet Minister
Dhenkanal	56	Hindol (SC)	Simarani Nayak	Bharatiya Janata Party	
Dhenkanal	57	Kamakhyanagar	Satrughan Jena	Bharatiya Janata Party	
Dhenkanal	58	Parjanga	Bibhuti Bhusan Pradhan	Bharatiya Janata Party	
Angul	59	Pallahara	Ashok Mohanty	Bharatiya Janata Party	
Angul	60	Talcher	Braja Kishore Pradhan	Biju Janata Dal	
Angul	61	Angul	Pratap Chandra Pradhan	Bharatiya Janata Party	
Angul	62	Chhendipada (SC)	Agasti Behera	Bharatiya Janata Party	
Angul	63	Athmallik	Nalini Kanta Pradhan	Biju Janata Dal	
Subarnapur	64	Birmaharajpur (SC)	Raghunath Jagadala	Bharatiya Janata Party	
Subarnapur	65	Sonepur	Niranjan Pujari	Biju Janata Dal	
Bolangir	66	Loisingha (SC)	Mukesh Mahaling	Bharatiya Janata Party	Cabinet Minister
Bolangir	67	Patnagarh	Kanak Vardhan Singh Deo	Bharatiya Janata Party	Deputy Chief Minister
Bolangir	68	Bolangir	Kalikesh Narayan Singh Deo	Biju Janata Dal	
Bolangir	69	Titlagarh	Nabin Kumar Jain	Bharatiya Janata Party	
Bolangir	70	Kantabanji	Laxman Bag	Bharatiya Janata Party	
Nuapada	71	Nuapada	Rajendra Dholakia	Biju Janata Dal	Died on 8 September 2025
Nuapada	71	Nuapada	Jay Dholakia	Bharatiya Janata Party	Won in November 2025 Bypoll
Nuapada	72	Khariar	Adhiraj Mohan Panigrahi	Biju Janata Dal	
Nabarangpur	73	Umarkote (ST)	Nityananda Gond	Bharatiya Janata Party	Cabinet Minister
Nabarangpur	74	Jharigam (ST)	Narsing Bhatra	Bharatiya Janata Party	
Nabarangpur	75	Nabarangpur (ST)	Gouri Shankar Majhi	Bharatiya Janata Party	
Nabarangpur	76	Dabugam (ST)	Manohar Randhari	Biju Janata Dal	
Kalahandi	77	Lanjigarh (ST)	Pradip Kumar Dishari	Biju Janata Dal	
Kalahandi	78	Junagarh	Dibya Shankar Mishra	Biju Janata Dal	
Kalahandi	79	Dharmagarh	Sudhir Ranjan Pattjoshi	Bharatiya Janata Party	
Kalahandi	80	Bhawanipatna (SC)	Sagar Charan Das	Indian National Congress	
Kalahandi	81	Narla	Manorama Mohanty	Biju Janata Dal	
Kandhamal	82	Baliguda (ST)	Chakramani Kanhar	Biju Janata Dal	Suspended from Party for cross voting in 2026 RS election
Kandhamal	83	G. Udayagiri (ST)	Prafulla Chandra Pradhan	Indian National Congress	
Kandhamal	84	Phulbani (ST)	Uma Charan Mallick	Bharatiya Janata Party	
Boudh	85	Kantamal	Kanhai Charan Danga	Bharatiya Janata Party	
Boudh	86	Boudh	Saroj Kumar Pradhan	Bharatiya Janata Party	Govt. Chief Whip
Cuttack	87	Baramba	Bijaya Kumar Dalabehera	Independent	Supports Bharatiya Janata Party
Cuttack	88	Banki	Devi Ranjan Tripathy	Biju Janata Dal	Suspended from Party for cross voting in 2026 RS election
Cuttack	89	Athgarh	Ranendra Pratap Swain	Biju Janata Dal	
Cuttack	90	Barabati-Cuttack	Sofia Firdous	Independent politician	Suspended from Party for cross voting in 2026 RS election
Cuttack	91	Choudwar-Cuttack	Souvic Biswal	Biju Janata Dal	Suspended from Party for cross voting in 2026 RS election
Cuttack	92	Niali (SC)	Chhabi Malik	Bharatiya Janata Party	
Cuttack	93	Cuttack Sadar (SC)	Prakash Chandra Sethi	Bharatiya Janata Party	
Cuttack	94	Salipur	Prasanta Behera	Biju Janata Dal	
Cuttack	95	Mahanga	Sarada Prasad Padhan	Independent	Supports Bharatiya Janata Party
Kendrapara	96	Patkura	Arvind Mohapatra	Biju Janata Dal	Suspended from Party for Anti Party Activities
Kendrapara	97	Kendrapara (SC)	Ganeswar Behera	Biju Janata Dal	
Kendrapara	98	Aul	Pratap Keshari Deb	Biju Janata Dal	Deputy Chief Whip, BJD
Kendrapara	99	Rajanagar	Dhruba Charan Sahoo	Biju Janata Dal	
Kendrapara	100	Mahakalapada	Durga Prasan Nayak	Bharatiya Janata Party	
Jagatsinghpur	101	Paradeep	Sampad Chandra Swain	Bharatiya Janata Party	Minister of State (I/C)
Jagatsinghpur	102	Tirtol (SC)	Ramakanta Bhoi	Biju Janata Dal	Suspended from Party for cross voting in 2026 RS election
Jagatsinghpur	103	Balikuda-Erasama	Sarada Prasanna Jena	Biju Janata Dal	
Jagatsinghpur	104	Jagatsinghpur	Amarendra Das	Bharatiya Janata Party	
Puri	105	Kakatpur (SC)	Tusharkanti Behera	Biju Janata Dal	
Puri	106	Nimapara	Pravati Parida	Bharatiya Janata Party	Deputy Chief Minister
Puri	107	Puri	Sunil Kumar Mohanty	Biju Janata Dal	
Puri	108	Brahmagiri	Upasna Mohapatra	Bharatiya Janata Party	
Puri	109	Satyabadi	Om Prakash Mishra	Bharatiya Janata Party	
Puri	110	Pipili	Ashrit Pattanayak	Bharatiya Janata Party	
Khordha	111	Jayadev (SC)	Naba Kishor Mallick	Biju Janata Dal	Suspended from Party for cross voting in 2026 RS election
Khordha	112	Bhubaneswar Central	Ananta Narayan Jena	Biju Janata Dal	
Khordha	113	Bhubaneswar North	Susant Kumar Rout	Biju Janata Dal	
Khordha	114	Ekamra Bhubaneswar	Babu Singh	Bharatiya Janata Party	
Khordha	115	Jatani	Bibhuti Bhusan Balabantaray	Biju Janata Dal	
Khordha	116	Begunia	Pradip Kumar Sahu	Biju Janata Dal	
Khordha	117	Khurda	Prasanta Kumar Jagadev	Bharatiya Janata Party	
Khordha	118	Chilika	Prithviraj Harichandan	Bharatiya Janata Party	Cabinet Minister
Nayagarh	119	Ranpur	Surama Padhy	Bharatiya Janata Party	Speaker
Nayagarh	120	Khandapada	Dusmanta Kumar Swain	Bharatiya Janata Party	
Nayagarh	121	Daspalla (SC)	Ramesh Chandra Behera	Biju Janata Dal	
Nayagarh	122	Nayagarh	Arun Kumar Sahoo	Biju Janata Dal	
Ganjam	123	Bhanjanagar	Pradyumna Kumar Nayak	Bharatiya Janata Party	
Ganjam	124	Polasara	Gokula Nanda Mallik	Bharatiya Janata Party	Minister of State (I/C)
Ganjam	125	Kabisuryanagar	Pratap Chandra Nayak	Bharatiya Janata Party	
Ganjam	126	Khalikote (SC)	Purna Chandra Sethy	Bharatiya Janata Party	
Ganjam	127	Chhatrapur (SC)	Krushna Chandra Nayak	Bharatiya Janata Party	
Ganjam	128	Aska	Saroj Kumar Padhi	Bharatiya Janata Party	
Ganjam	129	Surada	Nilamani Bisoyi	Bharatiya Janata Party	
Ganjam	130	Sanakhemundi	Ramesh Chandra Jena	Indian National Congress	Suspended from Party for cross voting in 2026 RS election
Ganjam	131	Hinjili	Naveen Patnaik	Biju Janata Dal	Leader of Opposition
Ganjam	132	Gopalpur	Bibhuti Bhushan Jena	Bharatiya Janata Party	Cabinet Minister
Ganjam	133	Berhampur	K. Anil Kumar	Bharatiya Janata Party	
Ganjam	134	Digapahandi	Sidhant Mohapatra	Bharatiya Janata Party	
Ganjam	135	Chikiti	Manoranjan Dyan Samantara	Bharatiya Janata Party	
Gajapati	136	Mohana (ST)	Dasarathi Gomango	Indian National Congress	Suspended from Party for cross voting in 2026 RS election
Gajapati	137	Paralakhemundi	Rupesh Kumar Panigrahi	Biju Janata Dal	
Rayagada	138	Gunupur (ST)	Satyajeet Gomango	Indian National Congress	
Rayagada	139	Bissam Cuttack (ST)	Nilamadhab Hikaka	Indian National Congress	
Rayagada	140	Rayagada (ST)	Kadraka Appala Swamy	Indian National Congress	
Koraput	141	Lakshmipur (ST)	Pabitra Saunta	Indian National Congress	
Koraput	142	Kotpad (ST)	Rupu Bhatra	Bharatiya Janata Party	
Koraput	143	Jeypore	Tara Prasad Bahinipati	Indian National Congress	
Koraput	144	Koraput (SC)	Raghuram Machha	Bharatiya Janata Party	
Koraput	145	Pottangi (ST)	Rama Chandra Kadam	Indian National Congress	Leader of Congress Legislature Party
Malkangiri	146	Malkangiri (ST)	Narasinga Madkami	Bharatiya Janata Party	
Malkangiri	147	Chitrakonda (ST)	Mangu Khilla	Indian National Congress	

== Speakers of Odisha Legislative Assembly ==
List of Speakers of the Odisha Legislative Assembly

Speakers of the Odisha Legislative Assembly
No.	Portrait	Name (Birth–Death) Constituency	Term of office			Chief Minister(s)	Assembly (Election)	Party
1		Mukunda Prasad Das (1887–1969); Central Balasore Sadar	28 July 1937	29 May 1946	8 years, 305 days	Krushna Chandra Gajapati; Bishwanath Das; Krushna Chandra Gajapati	1st Provincial (1937)	Indian National Congress
2		Lal Mohan Patnaik (1891–1956); Indian Christian	29 May 1946	6 March 1952	5 years, 282 days	Harekrushna Mahatab; Nabakrushna Choudhuri	2nd Provincial (1946)	Indian National Congress
3		Nanda Kishore Das (1907–1986); Soro	6 March 1952	27 May 1957	5 years, 82 days	Nabakrushna Choudhuri; Harekrushna Mahatab	1st (1952)	Indian National Congress
4		Nilakantha Das (1884–1967); Satyabadi	27 May 1957	25 February 1961	3 years, 274 days	Harekrushna Mahatab	2nd (1957)	Indian National Congress
President's rule (25 February – 23 June 1961)
5		Lingaraj Panigrahi (1896–1969); Kodala East	1 July 1961	18 March 1967	5 years, 260 days	Biju Patnaik; Biren Mitra; Sadashiva Tripathy	3rd (1961)	Indian National Congress
6		Nandakishore Mishra (1906–1992); Loisingha	18 March 1967	11 January 1971	3 years, 299 days	Rajendra Narayan Singh Deo	4th (1967)	Swatantra Party
President's rule (11 January – 3 April 1971)
(6)		Nandakishore Mishra (1906–1992); Loisingha	12 April 1971	3 March 1973	1 year, 325 days	Bishwanath Das; Nandini Satpathy	5th (1971)	Swatantra Party
President's rule (3 March 1973 – 6 March 1974)
7		Brajamohan Mohanty (1923–1999); Puri	21 March 1974	16 December 1976	2 years, 270 days	Nandini Satpathy	6th (1974)	Indian National Congress
President's rule (16 December – 29 December 1976)
(7)		Brajamohan Mohanty (1923–1999); Puri	30 December 1976	30 April 1977	121 days	Binayak Acharya	6th (1974)	Indian National Congress
President's rule (30 April – 26 June 1977)
8		Satyapriya Mohanty (1905–1999); Bhubaneswar	1 July 1977	17 February 1980	2 years, 231 days	Nilamani Routray	7th (1977)	Janata Party
President's rule (17 February – 9 June 1980)
9		Somnath Rath (1924–2013); Bhanjanagar	12 June 1980	11 February 1984	3 years, 244 days	Janaki Ballabh Patnaik	8th (1980)	Indian National Congress
10		Prasanna Kumar Dash (1919–2005); Baripada	22 February 1984	14 March 1985	1 year, 20 days	Janaki Ballabh Patnaik	8th (1980)	Indian National Congress
10		Prasanna Kumar Dash (1919–2005); Baripada	14 March 1985	9 March 1990	4 years, 360 days	Janaki Ballabh Patnaik; Hemananda Biswal	9th (1985)	Indian National Congress
11		Yudhistir Das (1923–2014); Kissannagar	9 March 1990	22 March 1995	5 years, 13 days	Biju Patnaik	10th (1990)	Janata Dal
12		Kishore Chandra Patel (born 1946); Sundargarh	22 March 1995	14 January 1996	298 days	Janaki Ballabh Patnaik; Giridhar Gamang; Hemananda Biswal	11th (1995)	Indian National Congress
13		Chintamani Dyan Samantra (born 1940); Chikiti	16 February 1996	10 March 2000	4 years, 23 days	Janaki Ballabh Patnaik; Giridhar Gamang; Hemananda Biswal	11th (1995)	Independent
14		Sarat Kumar Kar (1939–2020); Mahanga	10 March 2000	21 May 2004	4 years, 72 days	Naveen Patnaik	12th (2000)	Biju Janata Dal
15		Maheswar Mohanty (1956–2023); Puri	21 May 2004	31 March 2008	3 years, 315 days	Naveen Patnaik	13th (2004)	Biju Janata Dal
16		Prahlad Dora (Acting) (1946–2021); Chitrakonda	31 March 2008	19 August 2008	141 days	Naveen Patnaik	13th (2004)	Bharatiya Janata Party
17		Kishore Kumar Mohanty (1958–2021); Jharsuguda	19 August 2008	25 May 2009	279 days	Naveen Patnaik	13th (2004)	Biju Janata Dal
18		Pradip Kumar Amat (born 1952); Boudh	25 May 2009	20 May 2014	4 years, 360 days	Naveen Patnaik	14th (2009)	Biju Janata Dal
19		Niranjan Pujari (born 1961); Sonepur	26 May 2014	6 May 2017	2 years, 345 days	Naveen Patnaik	15th (2014)	Biju Janata Dal
20		Pradip Kumar Amat (born 1952); Boudh	16 May 2017	31 May 2019	2 years, 15 days	Naveen Patnaik	15th (2014)	Biju Janata Dal
21		Surjya Narayan Patro (1948–2023); Digapahandi	1 June 2019	4 June 2022	3 years, 3 days	Naveen Patnaik	16th (2019)	Biju Janata Dal
22		Bikram Keshari Arukha (born 1962); Bhanjanagar	13 June 2022	12 May 2023	333 days	Naveen Patnaik	16th (2019)	Biju Janata Dal
23		Pramila Mallik (born 1963); Binjharpur	22 September 2023	3 June 2024	255 days	Naveen Patnaik	16th (2019)	Biju Janata Dal
24		Surama Padhy (born 1960); Ranpur	20 June 2024	Incumbent	2 years, 136 days	Mohan Charan Majhi	17th (2024)	Bharatiya Janata Party

== Deputy Speakers of Odisha Legislative Assembly ==
List of Deputy Speakers of the Odisha Legislative Assembly

Share of time in office for Odisha Deputy Speakers by party (1937–present)
1. Indian National Congress (53.1%)
2. Biju Janata Dal (17.2%)
3. Bharatiya Janata Party (13.0%)
4. Janata Dal (5.91%)
5. Praja Socialist Party (4.49%)
6. Janata Party (3.04%)
7. Utkal Congress (2.17%)
8. Independent (1.04%)

Deputy Speakers of the Odisha Legislative Assembly
No.	Portrait	Name (Birth–Death)	Constituency	Term of office			Assembly (Election)	Party
1		Nanda Kishore Das (1907–1986)	South Balasore Sadar	28 July 1937	14 September 1945	8 years, 48 days	1st Provincial (1937)	Indian National Congress
2		Adruti Laxmibai (1899–1986)	Berhampur Town	29 May 1946	20 February 1952	5 years, 267 days	2nd Provincial (1946)	Indian National Congress
3		Mahammed Hanif	Bhadrak	8 March 1952	4 March 1957	4 years, 361 days	1st (1952)	Indian National Congress
4		Jadumani Mangaraj (1894–1964)	Barchana	29 May 1957	25 February 1961	3 years, 272 days	2nd (1957)	Indian National Congress
President's rule (25 February – 23 June 1961)
5		Lokanath Mishra (1909–1967)	Patkura	28 August 1961	1 March 1967	5 years, 185 days	3rd (1961)	Indian National Congress
6		Harihar Bahinipati (1927–2005)	Puri	29 March 1967	11 January 1971	3 years, 288 days	4th (1967)	Praja Socialist Party
President's rule (11 January – 3 April 1971)
7		Narayan Birabar Samanta (1900–1999)	Erasama	6 May 1971	3 March 1973	1 year, 301 days	5th (1971)	Utkal Congress
President's rule (3 March 1973 – 6 March 1974)
8		Chintamani Jena (1929–2008)	Basta	29 March 1974	30 April 1977	3 years, 32 days	6th (1974)	Indian National Congress
President's rule (30 April – 26 June 1977)
9		Surendra Nath Naik (1937–2024)	Kakatpur	27 July 1977	17 February 1980	2 years, 205 days	7th (1977)	Janata Party
President's rule (17 February – 9 June 1980)
10		Himansu Sekhar Padhi	Boudh	2 July 1980	9 March 1985	4 years, 250 days	8th (1980)	Indian National Congress
11		Chintamani Dyan Samantra (born 1940)	Chikiti	18 March 1985	3 March 1990	4 years, 350 days	9th (1985)	Indian National Congress
12		Prahlad Dora (1946–2021)	Chitrakonda	20 March 1990	15 March 1995	4 years, 360 days	10th (1990)	Janata Dal
(11)		Chintamani Dyan Samantra (born 1940)	Chikiti	28 March 1995	12 February 1996	321 days	11th (1995)	Independent
13		Bibhuti Bhusan Singh Mardaraj (1955–2025)	Khandapada	15 March 1996	29 February 2000	3 years, 351 days	11th (1995)	Indian National Congress
14		Rama Chandra Panda (born 1949)	Chhatrapur	27 March 2000	6 February 2004	3 years, 316 days	12th (2000)	Bharatiya Janata Party
(12)		Prahlad Dora (1946–2021)	Chitrakonda	3 July 2004	19 May 2009	4 years, 320 days	13th (2004)	Bharatiya Janata Party
15		Lal Bihari Himirika (born 1948)	Rayagada	10 June 2009	10 May 2011	1 year, 334 days	14th (2009)	Biju Janata Dal
16		Sananda Marndi (born 1971)	Baripada	17 August 2011	18 May 2014	2 years, 274 days	14th (2009)	Biju Janata Dal
16		Sananda Marndi (born 1971)	Baripada	16 June 2014	29 May 2019	4 years, 347 days	15th (2014)	Biju Janata Dal
17		Rajanikant Singh (born 1955)	Angul	27 June 2019	8 November 2023	4 years, 134 days	16th (2019)	Biju Janata Dal
18		Saluga Pradhan (born 1959)	G. Udayagiri	21 November 2023	3 June 2024	195 days	16th (2019)	Biju Janata Dal
19		Bhabani Shankar Bhoi (born 1980)	Talsara	24 July 2024	Incumbent	2 years, 102 days	17th (2024)	Bharatiya Janata Party

== Leader of Opposition of Odisha Legislative Assembly ==
List of leaders of the opposition in the Odisha Legislative Assembly

#	Portrait	Name (lifespan) Constituency	Tenure			Chief Minister	Assembly (Election)	Party
1		Shraddhakar Supakar (1914–1993); MLA from Rairakhol	16 February 1952	4 March 1957	5 years, 16 days	Nabakrushna Choudhuri	1st (1952)	All India Ganatantra Parishad
2		Rajendra Narayan Singh Deo (1912–1975); MLA from Titlagarh	1 April 1957	22 May 1959	2 years, 51 days	Nabakrushna Choudhuri Harekrushna Mahatab	2nd (1957)	All India Ganatantra Parishad
President's rule was imposed in during the period (25 February – 23 June 1961)
(2)		Rajendra Narayan Singh Deo (1912–1975); MLA from Kantabanji	21 June 1961	1 March 1967	5 years, 253 days	Biju Patnaik Biren Mitra Sadashiva Tripathy	3rd (1961)	All India Ganatantra Parishad
3		Sadashiva Tripathy (1910–1980); MLA from Nowrangpur	18 March 1967	11 January 1971	3 years, 311 days	Rajendra Narayan Singh Deo	4th (1967)	Indian National Congress
President's rule was imposed in during the period (11 January – 3 April 1971)
4		Binayak Acharya (1918–1983); MLA from Berhampur	4 May 1971	14 June 1972	1 year, 41 days	Bishwanath Das	5th (1971)	Indian National Congress
(2)		Rajendra Narayan Singh Deo (1912–1975); MLA from Bolangir	14 June 1972	9 February 1973	240 days	Nandini Satpathy	5th (1971)	Swatantra Party
5		Biju Patnaik (1916–1997); MLA from Rajanagar	9 February 1973	3 March 1973	22 days	Nandini Satpathy	5th (1971)	Utkal Congress
President's rule was imposed in during the period (3 March 1973 – 6 March 1974)
(5)		Biju Patnaik (1916–1997); MLA from Rajanagar	19 March 1974	10 December 1974	266 days	Nandini Satpathy	6th (1974)	Utkal Congress
(5)		Biju Patnaik (1916–1997); MLA from Rajanagar	10 December 1974	16 December 1976	2 years, 6 days	Nandini Satpathy	6th (1974)	Bharatiya Lok Dal
President's rule was imposed in during the period (16 December – 29 December 1976)
(5)		Biju Patnaik (1916–1997); MLA from Rajanagar	30 December 1976	24 March 1977	84 days	Binayak Acharya	6th (1974)	Bharatiya Lok Dal
6		Ram Prasad Mishra (1920–2014); MLA from Kantabanji	31 March 1977	30 April 1977	30 days	Binayak Acharya	6th (1974)	Janata Party
President's rule was imposed in during the period (30 April – 26 June 1977)
7		Chintamani Panigrahi (1922–2000); MLA from Begunia	29 June 1977	20 February 1978	236 days	Nilamani Routray	7th (1977)	Indian National Congress (R)
8		Brundaban Nayak (1912–1984); MLA from Hinjili	20 February 1978	3 September 1979	1 year, 195 days	Nilamani Routray	7th (1977)	Indian National Congress (I)
9		Prahlad Mallik (1929–1990); MLA from Patkura	3 September 1979	13 February 1980	163 days	Nilamani Routray	7th (1977)	Orissa Janata Party
10		Ananta Narayan Singh Deo (1929–2003); MLA from Surada	13 February 1980	17 February 1980	4 days	Nilamani Routray	7th (1977)	Janata Party
President's rule was imposed in during the period (17 February – 9 June 1980)
-	Vacant (Note: No party was able to secure 10% of the assembly strength i.e. 14 Seats)		9 June 1980	1 April 1984	3 years, 297 days	Janaki Ballabh Patnaik	8th (1980)	No Official Opposition
11		Sarat Kumar Deb (1944–1988); MLA from Aul	2 April 1984	10 March 1985	342 days	Janaki Ballabh Patnaik	8th (1980)	Janata Party (Secular)
(5)		Biju Patnaik (1916–1997); MLA from Bhubaneswar	22 March 1985	3 March 1990	4 years, 346 days	Janaki Ballabh Patnaik Hemananda Biswal	9th (1985)	Janata Party
-	Vacant (Note: No party was able to secure 10% of the assembly strength i.e. 14 Seats)		5 March 1990	15 March 1995	5 years, 10 days	Biju Patnaik	10th (1990)	No Official Opposition
(5)		Biju Patnaik (1916–1997); MLA from Bhubaneswar	23 March 1995	20 May 1996	1 year, 58 days	Janaki Ballabh Patnaik Giridhar Gamang Hemananda Biswal	11th (1995)	Janata Dal
12		Ashok Kumar Das (1942–2008); MLA from Korei	22 May 1996	17 December 1997	1 year, 209 days	Janaki Ballabh Patnaik Giridhar Gamang Hemananda Biswal	11th (1995)	Janata Dal
13		Ram Krushna Patnaik (1940–2021); MLA from Kodala	22 February 1998	16 November 1998	267 days	Janaki Ballabh Patnaik Giridhar Gamang Hemananda Biswal	11th (1995)	Biju Janata Dal
14		Prafulla Samal (born 1947); MLA from Bhadrak	16 November 1998	1 December 1998	15 days	Janaki Ballabh Patnaik Giridhar Gamang Hemananda Biswal	11th (1995)	Biju Janata Dal
15		Satchidananda Dalal (born 1941); MLA from Boudh	11 December 1998	29 February 2000	1 year, 80 days	Janaki Ballabh Patnaik Giridhar Gamang Hemananda Biswal	11th (1995)	Biju Janata Dal
16		Ramakanta Mishra (born 1944); MLA from Ranpur	21 March 2000	6 February 2004	3 years, 322 days	Naveen Patnaik	12th (2000)	Indian National Congress
17		Janaki Ballabh Patnaik (1927–2015); MLA from Begunia	4 June 2004	24 January 2009	4 years, 234 days	Naveen Patnaik	13th (2004)	Indian National Congress
18		Ramachandra Ulaka (1935–2011); MLA from Rayagada	24 January 2009	19 May 2009	115 days	Naveen Patnaik	13th (2004)	Indian National Congress
19		Bhupinder Singh (born 1951); MLA from Narla	27 May 2009	10 March 2014	4 years, 287 days	Naveen Patnaik	14th (2009)	Indian National Congress
20		Narasingha Mishra (born 1940); MLA from Bolangir	11 June 2014	29 May 2019	4 years, 352 days	Naveen Patnaik	15th (2014)	Indian National Congress
21		Pradipta Kumar Naik (born 1966); MLA from Bhawanipatna	25 June 2019	30 July 2022	3 years, 35 days	Naveen Patnaik	16th (2019)	Bharatiya Janata Party
22		Jayanarayan Mishra (born 1963); MLA from Sambalpur	30 July 2022	4 June 2024	1 year, 310 days	Naveen Patnaik	16th (2019)	Bharatiya Janata Party
23		Naveen Patnaik (born 1946); MLA from Hinjili	19 June 2024	Incumbent	2 years, 137 days	Mohan Charan Majhi	17th (2024)	Biju Janata Dal

== See also ==
- Government of Odisha
- List of Constituencies of Odisha Legislative Assembly
- Governor of Odisha
- Chief Minister of Odisha
- Deputy Chief Minister of Odisha
- Speaker of the Odisha Legislative Assembly
- Leader of the Opposition in the Odisha Legislative Assembly
- Orissa High Court
- Parliament of India
