= Raseswari Panigrahi =

Indian politician (1946–2026)

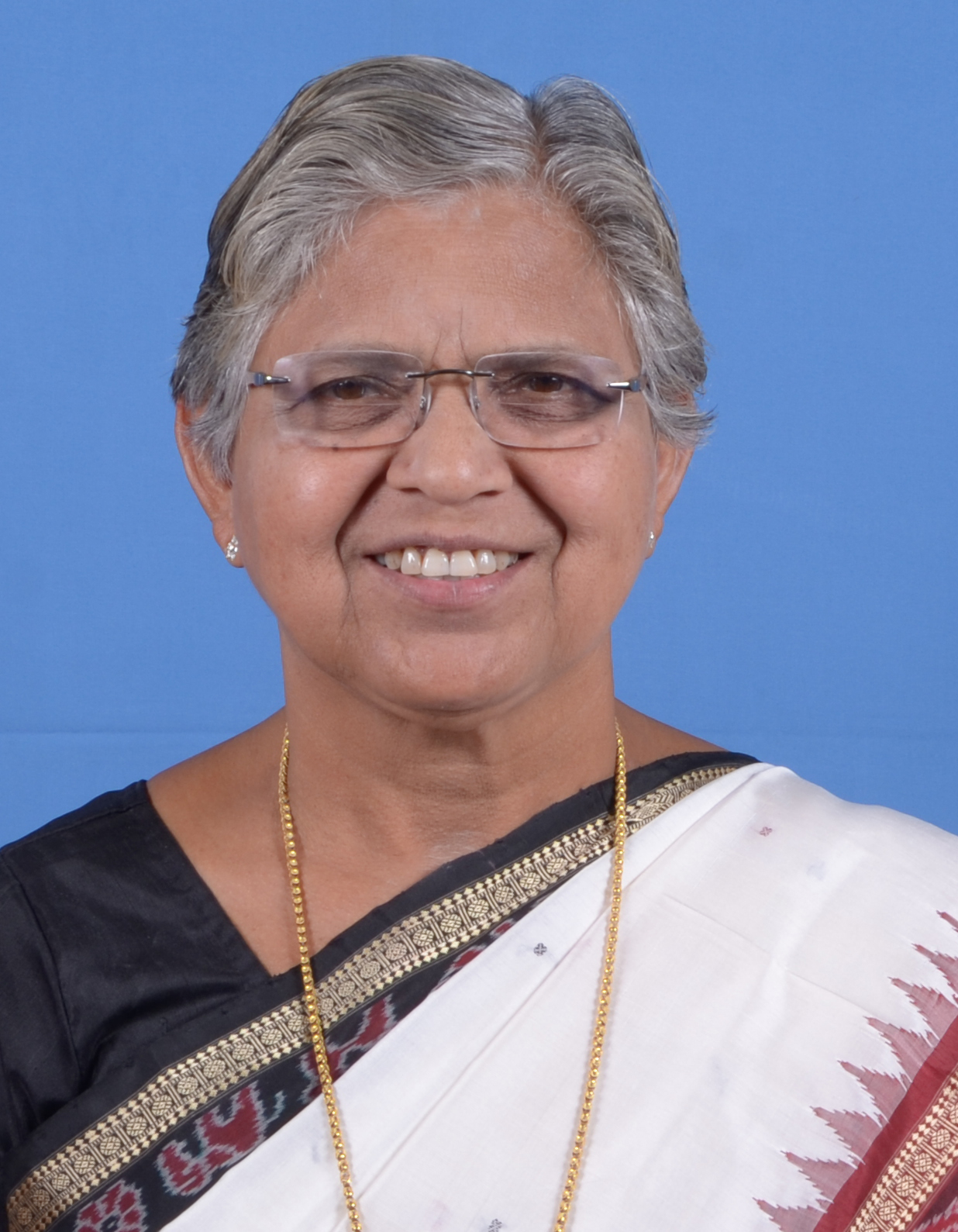

Member of the Odisha Legislative Assembly
- In office 2014–2019
- Preceded by: Jayanarayan Mishra
- Succeeded by: Jayanarayan Mishra
- Constituency: Sambalpur

Personal details
- Born: 28 October 1946
- Died: 16 February 2026 (aged 79) Sambalpur, Odisha, India
- Party: Biju Janata Dal
- Relations: Sriballav Panigrahi (brother)
- Parent: Narasingha Panigrahi (ବାପା)
- Occupation: Politician

Raseswari Panigrahi (28 October 1946 – 16 February 2026) was an Indian politician from Odisha. She was active with Biju Janata Dal in Odisha politics. She was elected to the Odisha Legislative Assembly from Sambalpur constituency in the 2014 Odisha Legislative Assembly election as a member of the Biju Janata Dal.

== Background ==
Panigrahi was born on 28 October 1946 to Narasingha Panigrahi. Her brother Sriballav Panigrahi was also a politician. She was a gynaecologist by profession.

== Political career ==
Panigrahi entered politics after her retirement. Though her brother was active in Indian National Congress, she joined Biju Janata Dal and was elected in the 2014 Odisha Legislative Assembly election to the 15th Odisha Vidhan Sabha from Sambalpur. In the 2019 election, she lost to Jaynarayan Mishra of BJP.

== Death ==
Panigrahi died after suffering from neurological complications on 16 February 2026, at the age of 79.
