= Jayanarayan Mishra =

Indian politician

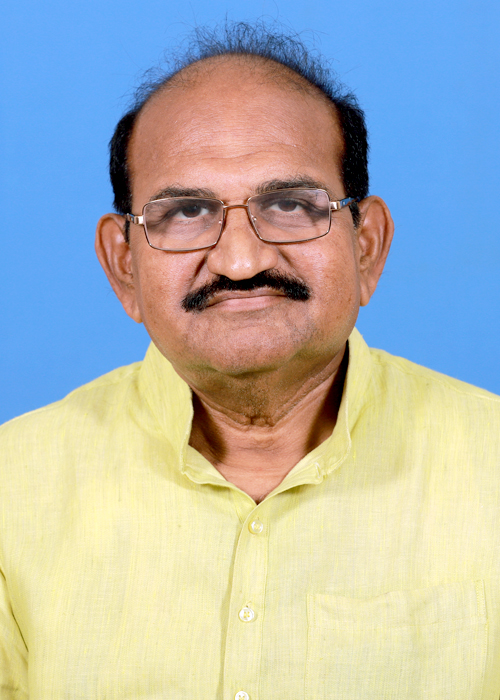

Leader of the Opposition, Odisha Legislative Assembly
- In office 30 July 2022 – 4 June 2024
- Preceded by: Pradipta Kumar Naik
- Succeeded by: Naveen Patnaik

Minister of Commerce & Transport Government of Odisha
- In office 18 May 2004 – 9 March 2009
- Chief Minister: Naveen Patnaik
- Preceded by: Droupadi Murmu

Member of Odisha Legislative Assembly
- Incumbent
- Assumed office 23 May 2019
- Preceded by: Raseswari Panigrahi
- Constituency: Sambalpur
- In office 2000–2014
- Preceded by: Durga Shankar Patnaik
- Succeeded by: Raseswari Panigrahi
- Constituency: Sambalpur

Personal details
- Born: 10 June 1963 (age 63)
- Party: Bharatiya Janata Party
- Spouse: Jyotsna Mishra
- Children: 2
- Parent: Artatran Mishra (father)
- Education: Bachelor of Arts
- Profession: Agriculturist

Jayanarayan Mishra (born 10 June 1963) is an Indian politician from Odisha, affiliated with the Bharatiya Janata Party (BJP). He is a senior leader in the Odisha Legislative Assembly and has represented the Sambalpur constituency five times. Mishra has held various key positions, including Minister of Commerce & Transport and Leader of the Opposition in the Odisha Assembly.

== Early life and education ==
Jayanarayan Mishra was born on 10 June 1963 in Sambalpur, Odisha. He completed his Bachelor of Arts (B.A.) degree from NAC College, Burla. Coming from a family involved in agriculture, Mishra has maintained close ties with rural and social service activities throughout his career.

== Political career ==
Mishra began his political journey with the Bharatiya Janata Party and was first elected as a Member of Legislative Assembly (MLA) from the Sambalpur constituency in 2000. Since then, he has been re-elected multiple times, establishing himself as a prominent leader in the region.

=== Ministerial role ===
He served as the minister of commerce and transport in the Odisha government during the BJD–BJP coalition government headed by Chief Minister Naveen Patnaik.

=== Leader of the opposition ===
In 2022, Jayanarayan Mishra was appointed the Leader of the Opposition in the Odisha Legislative Assembly, representing the BJP.

== Controversies ==
=== Alleged misconduct with police officer ===
In 2023, Mishra was involved in a controversy when an FIR was filed against him for alleged misconduct with a police officer. Mishra denied the allegations. The case attracted significant media attention in Odisha.

=== Remarks on Odisha state song and regional identity ===
In 2025, Mishra sparked political controversy by questioning the state song "Bande Utkal Janani," arguing that it praises only the Utkal region and neglects other regions like Koshal and Kalinga. He suggested renaming it "Bande Odisha Janani" to represent all 30 districts. The opposition criticized his comments, which led to a clarification from the Odisha government distancing itself from his views, stating they were his personal opinions.

In April 2025, Mishra’s daughter stirred political controversy by sitting through the Odisha state song during a public event. Some political groups saw this as disrespectful, further fueling tensions around regional identity issues.

=== Statement on merger of Koshal with Odisha ===
Mishra further ignited controversy by calling the merger of the western Odisha region Koshal with the state a "historic blunder", claiming the region has been neglected and exploited in various sectors. This statement led to protests and disruptions in the Odisha Legislative Assembly, with opposition parties accusing him of promoting divisive ideas and undermining Odisha’s unity. The BJD demanded an apology and urged the BJP leadership to take a clear stance on his remarks.

=== Incident of abusing police officer ===
In April 2025, Mishra was involved in a controversy for allegedly abusing a police officer in Sambalpur and threatening to set a police station on fire, which attracted media attention and criticism.

== See also ==
- Samaleswari SC
