= Ashok Kumar Das =

Indian politician

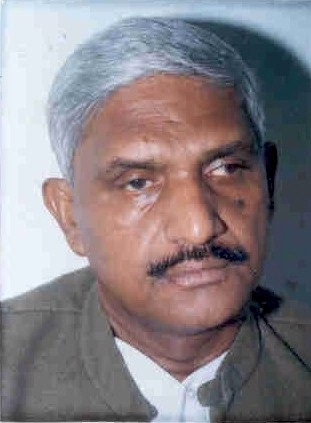

Leader of the Opposition in the Odisha Legislative Assembly
- In office 22 May 1996 – 17 December 1997
- Preceded by: Biju Patnaik
- Succeeded by: Rama Krishna Patnaik

Member of the Odisha Legislative Assembly
- In office 6 March 1974 – 17 February 1980
- Preceded by: None
- Succeeded by: Niranjan Jena
- Constituency: Korei
- In office 3 March 1990 – 29 February 2000
- Preceded by: Rama Chandra Khuntia
- Succeeded by: Sanchita Mohanty

Personal details
- Born: 15 March 1942 Jajpur district, Odisha, India
- Died: 30 December 2008 (aged 66) Cuttack, Odisha, India
- Party: Nationalist Congress Party
- Other political affiliations: Swatantra Party; Utkal Congress; Janata Party; Janata Dal; Biju Janata Dal; Janata Dal (Secular)
- Spouse: Sandhyarani Das
- Children: Pranab Prakash Das; Bhaba Prasad Das; Two daughters
- Education: Gangadhar Meher College, Sambalpur (B.A. Hons)
- Profession: Politician, agriculturist, pisciculturist

Ashok Kumar Das (15 March 1942 – 30 December 2008) was a prominent Indian politician, seasoned legislator, and veteran socialist leader from Odisha. He served as a four-term Member of the Odisha Legislative Assembly from the Korei Assembly constituency and was the Leader of the Opposition from 1996 to 1997.

== Early life and education ==
Das was born on 15 March 1942 in the Jajpur district of Odisha into a prominent Karan family. He completed his higher education at the Gangadhar Meher College in Sambalpur, graduating with a Bachelor of Arts with Honours in History.

== Political activism and career ==
Das began his public career as a grassroot activist and heavily aligned himself with anti-establishment socialist movements. In 1974, he actively joined the Bihar Movement led by freedom fighter Jayaprakash Narayan. Due to his political dissent against the government, he was arrested and detained as a political prisoner under the stringent Maintenance of Internal Security Act (MISA).

Over his extensive political career, Das was associated with various political fronts. He won his first legislative election to the Odisha Assembly from Korei in 1974 on a Swatantra Party ticket, followed by a re-election in 1977. He returned to the state assembly again for consecutive terms in 1990 and 1995 representing the Janata Dal. Following the split of the Janata Dal, he was briefly associated with the founding phase of the Biju Janata Dal (BJD) before leading the state unit of the Janata Dal (Secular) and later joining the Nationalist Congress Party (NCP).

Following the death of veteran leader Biju Patnaik, Das was appointed as the Leader of the Opposition in the state legislature, a post he held from May 1996 to December 1997.

== Personal life and death ==
Das was married to Sandhyarani Das. The couple had two sons and two daughters. His eldest son, Pranab Prakash Das, went on to inherit his political legacy, serving as a three-time MLA from Jajpur and a minister in the state cabinet. His son-in-law is the prominent Ollywood actor and politician Arindam Ray.

Das died on 30 December 2008 at a private hospital in Cuttack following a brief illness.
