= Gopalpur Assembly constituency =

Gopalpur Assembly constituency may refer to these electoral constituencies in India:

- Gopalpur, Bihar Assembly constituency
- Gopalpur, Odisha Assembly constituency
- Gopalpur, Uttar Pradesh Assembly constituency

== See also ==
- Gopalpur (disambiguation)
