= Chintamani Jena =

Indian politician (1924–2008)

Member of Parliament, Lok Sabha
- In office 1980–1989
- Preceded by: Samarendra Kundu
- Succeeded by: Samarendra Kundu
- Constituency: Balasore, Odisha

Personal details
- Born: Nadbani Village, Basta Tahasil, Balasore district, Odisha, British India; 24 January 1924
- Died: 14 May 2008 (aged 84) Bhubaneswar
- Party: Indian National Congress
- Spouse: Bindu Basini Jena

Chintamani Jena ( 24 January 1924 – 14 May 2008) was an Indian politician. He was elected to the Lok Sabha, the lower house of the Parliament of India as a member of the Indian National Congress.
