= Sriballav Panigrahi =

Indian politician

Member: 10th and 11th Lok Sabha
- In office 1991–1998
- Preceded by: Narayan Sahu
- Succeeded by: Debendra Pradhan
- Constituency: Deogarh

Member: 8th Lok Sabha
- In office 1984–1989
- Preceded by: Narayan Sahu
- Succeeded by: Ravi Narayan Pani
- Constituency: Deogarh

Personal details
- Born: 2 September 1940 Bargaon, Sambalpur
- Died: 9 July 2015 (aged 74) Bangalore, Karnataka
- Party: INC
- Spouse: Sunanda Panigrahi
- Relations: Raseswari Panigrahi (sister)
- Profession: Social Service

Sriballav Panigrahi (2 September 1940 – 9 July 2015) was an Indian politician, a leader of the Indian National Congress party in Odisha and was a member of the All India Congress Committee (AICC). He was elected to the Parliament of India from the Deogarh Lok Sabha constituency, three times, 1984, 1991 and 1996.

== Biography ==
Born at Bargaon, Sambalpur district, Odisha in 1940, he was elected as a Member of Parliament (Lok Sabha) from the Deogarh Parliamentary Constituency in 1984, 1991, and 1996, and was a Member of the Odisha Legislative Assembly for two terms (1971 & 1974). He was a Cabinet Minister in Odisha from 1973 to 1977.

== Personal life ==
He was married to Sunanda Panigrahi and had two sons. He died in 2015, aged 74.
