= Brajamohan Mohanty =

Indian politician (1924–1999)

Brajmohan Mohanty

Member of Parliament, Lok Sabha
- In office 1980–1989
- Preceded by: Padmacharan Samantasinhar
- Succeeded by: Nilamani Routray
- Constituency: Puri, Odisha

Personal details
- Born: 23 December 1924 Barimanda, Puri district, Odisha, British India
- Died: 24 July 1999 (aged 74)
- Party: Indian National Congress
- Spouse: Pramila Mohanty

Brajmohan Mohanty (23 December 1924 – 24 July 1999) was an Indian politician. He was elected to the Lok Sabha, the lower house of the Parliament of India as a member of the Indian National Congress.
