= Sarat Kumar Deb =

Indian politician and Pratap Keshari Deb's father

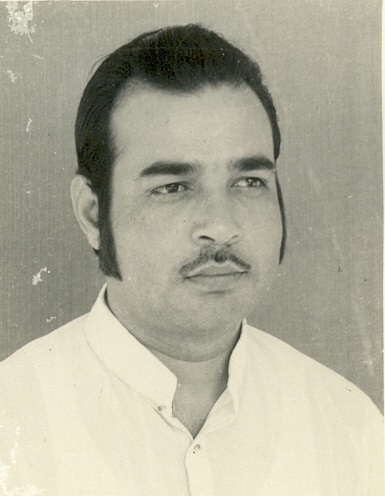

Member of Parliament, Lok Sabha
- In office 1985–1988
- Preceded by: Biju Patnaik
- Succeeded by: Rabi Ray
- Constituency: Kendrapara, Odisha

Personal details
- Born: Sarat Kumar Dev; 26 October 1944 Kendrapara, Odisha, India
- Died: March 24, 1988 (aged 43)
- Party: Janata Party
- Spouse: Sushree Devi
- Children: Pratap Keshari Deb (Son)

Sarat Kumar Deb, also written as Sarat Kumar Dev, and Sarat Dev "Sharat Kumar Dev" or Sarat Deb, "Sharat Kumar Deb", is an Indian Politician. He was elected to the Lok Sabha, the lower house of the Parliament of India from Kendrapara, Odisha as a member of the Janata Party.
