= Sambalpur Assembly constituency =

Assembly constituency in Odisha, India

Coordinates: 21.48°N 83.97°E

Sambalpur
- Constituency No. 17 for the Odisha Legislative Assembly

Constituency details
- Country: India
- Region: East India
- State: Odisha
- Division: Northern Division
- District: Sambalpur
- Lok Sabha constituency: Sambalpur
- Established: 1951
- Total electors: 2,06,279 (Note: as on 2024) (Note: as data published by election commission)
- Reservation: None

Member of Legislative Assembly
- 17th Odisha Legislative Assembly
- Incumbent Jayanarayan Mishra
- Party: Bhartiya Janata Party
- Elected year: 2024

Sambalpur is a Vidhan Sabha constituency of Sambalpur district, Odisha, India.

This constituency includes Sambalpur, Hirakud and Burla.

== Elected members ==
Vote share of winning candidates
| 2024 | 45.52% |
| 2019 | 44.53% |
| 2014 | 42.73% |
| 2009 | 43.52% |
| 2004 | 52.10% |
| 2000 | 54.51% |
| 1995 | 40.81% |
| 1990 | 45.30% |
| 1985 | 59.83% |
| 1980 | 64.87% |
| 1977 | 53.11% |

Since its formation in 1951, 17 elections were held till date. It was a 2 member constituency for 1952 & 1957.

List of members elected from Sambalpur constituency are:

| Year | Member | Party |
|---|---|---|
| 2024 | Jayanarayan Mishra | Bharatiya Janata Party |
| 2019 | Jayanarayan Mishra | Bharatiya Janata Party |
| 2014 | Raseswari Panigrahi | Biju Janata Dal |
| 2009 | Jayanarayan Mishra | Bharatiya Janata Party |
| 2004 | Jayanarayan Mishra | Bharatiya Janata Party |
| 2000 | Jayanarayan Mishra | Bharatiya Janata Party |
| 1995 | Durga Shankar Pattanayak | Indian National Congress |
| 1990 | Durga Shankar Pattanayak | Indian National Congress |
| 1985 | Shraddhakar Supakar | Indian National Congress |
| 1980 | Aswini Kumar Guru | Indian National Congress (I) |
| 1977 | Jhasketan Sahu | Janata Party |
| 1974 | Shriballav Panigrahi | Indian National Congress |
| 1971 | Shriballav Panigrahi | Indian National Congress (R) |
| 1967 | Banamali Babu | Indian National Congress |
| 1961 | Dalaganjan Chhuria | Indian National Congress |
| 1957 (Note: It was a 2 member constituency) | Lakshmiprasad Misra | Ganatantra Parishad |
| 1957 | Bhikari Ghasi | Ganatantra Parishad |
| 1951 (Note: It was a 2 member constituency) | Shraddhakar Supakar | Ganatantra Parishad |
| 1951 | Bhikari Ghasi | Ganatantra Parishad |

== Election results ==
=== 2024 ===
Voting were held on 25th May 2024 in 3rd phase of Odisha Assembly Election & 6th phase of Indian General Election. Counting of votes was on 4th June 2024. In 2024 election, Bharatiya Janata Party candidate Jayanarayan Mishra defeated Biju Janata Dal candidate Rohit Pujari by a margin of 4,105 votes.

2024 Odisha Vidhan Sabha Election: Sambalpur
| Party | Candidate | Votes | % | ±% |
|---|---|---|---|---|
| BJP | Jayanarayan Mishra | 59,827 | 45.52 | ▲0.99 |
| BJD | Rohit Pujari | 55,722 | 42.40 | ▲0.97 |
| INC | Durga Prasad Padhi | 10,265 | 7.81 | ▼1.24 |
| NOTA | None of the above | 1,513 | 1.15 | ▲0.17 |
| Majority | | 4,105 | 3.12 | ▼9.08 |
| Turnout | | 1,31,425 | 63.71 | ▼4.1 |
| BJP hold | | | | |

=== 2019 ===
In 2019 election, Bharatiya Janata Party candidate Jayanarayan Mishra defeated Biju Janata Dal candidate Raseswari Panigrahi by a margin of 4,380 votes.

2019 Odisha Vidhan Sabha Election: Sambalpur
| Party | Candidate | Votes | % | ±% |
|---|---|---|---|---|
| BJP | Jayanarayan Mishra | 57,349 | 44.53 | ▲10.60 |
| BJD | Raseswari Panigrahi | 52,969 | 41.13 | ▼1.60 |
| INC | Aswini Kumar Pujahari | 11,652 | 9.05 | ▼7.76 |
| NOTA | None of the above | 1,261 | 0.98 | ▼0.27 |
| Majority | | 4,380 | 12.20 | ▲3.41 |
| Turnout | | 1,28,789 | 61.35 | |
| BJP gain from BJD | | | | |

=== 2014 ===
In 2014 election, Biju Janata Dal candidate Raseswari Panigrahi defeated Bharatiya Janata Party candidate Jayanarayan Mishra by a margin of 9,958 votes.

2014 Odisha Vidhan Sabha Election: Sambalpur
| Party | Candidate | Votes | % | ±% |
|---|---|---|---|---|
| BJD | Raseswari Panigrahi | 48,362 | 42.73 | New entry |
| BJP | Jayanarayan Mishra | 38,404 | 33.93 | ▼9.59 |
| INC | Sureswar Mishra | 19,020 | 16.81 | ▼17.77 |
| NOTA | None of the above | 1,411 | 1.25 | − |
| Majority | | 9,958 | 8.79 | ▼0.15 |
| Turnout | | 1,13,180 | 65.45 | 19.94 |
| Registered electors | | 1,72,916 | | |
| BJD gain from BJP | | | | |

=== 2009 ===
In 2009 election, Bharatiya Janata Party candidate Jayanarayan Mishra defeated Indian National Congress candidate Sureswar Mishra by a margin of 7,010 votes.

2009 Odisha Vidhan Sabha Election: Sambalpur
| Party | Candidate | Votes | % | ±% |
|---|---|---|---|---|
| BJP | Jayanarayan Mishra | 34,110 | 43.52 | − |
| INC | Sureswar Mishra | 27,100 | 34.58 | − |
| NCP | Siddharth Das | 10,105 | 12.89 | − |
| Majority | | 7,010 | 8.94 (Note: % of total valid votes) | |
| Turnout | | 78,555 | 45.51 | |
| BJP hold | | | | |
