= Binayak Acharya =

Indian politician (1918–1983)

9th Chief Minister of Odisha
- In office 29 December 1976 – 30 April 1977
- Preceded by: Nandini Satpathy
- Succeeded by: Nilamani Routray

Personal details
- Born: 30 August 1918 Berhampur, Madras Presidency, British India (Now in Odisha)
- Died: 11 December 1983 (aged 65)
- Party: Indian National Congress
- Spouse: Bhagyalata Mishra
- Children: 3 Sons: Arun Acharya, Sarat Acharya & Sisira Acharya, 3 Daughters: Sobha, Sarojani & Kumudini

Binayak Acharya (30 August 1918 – 11 December 1983) was an Indian politician and the Chief Minister of Odisha from 29 December 1976 to 30 April 1977. In 1984, Binayak Acharya College in Berhampur was named after him.

Political offices
Preceded by Nandini Satapathy	Chief Minister of Odisha; 29 December 1976–30 April 1977	Succeeded by Nilamani Routray
