= 1st Orissa Legislative Assembly =

1st state legislature of the Indian state of Orissa

←	2nd Provincial Assembly	2nd Assembly	→
- Orissa Legislative Assembly

Overview
- Meeting place: Sardar Patel Hall, Bhubaneshwar, Odisha, India
- Term: 20 February 1952 – 4 March 1957
- Election: 1952 Orissa Legislative Assembly election
- Government: Indian National Congress
- Opposition: Ganatantra Parishad
- Website: assembly.odisha.gov.in

Orissa Legislative Assembly
- House Composition
- Members: 140
- Governor: Asaf Ali; Saiyid Fazl Ali; P. S. Kumaraswamy Raja; Bhim Sen Sachar
- Speaker: Nandakishore Das, INC
- Deputy Speaker: Mahammed Hanif, INC
- Leader of the House (Chief Minister): Nabakrushna Choudhuri, INC; Harekrushna Mahatab, INC
- Leader of Opposition: Shraddhakar Supakar, AIGP
- Party control: INC (77/140)
- 9 Sessions with 356 sitting days

The First Orissa Legislative Assembly was convened after the 1952 Orissa Legislative Assembly election.

== Brief History ==
Nabakrushna Choudhuri led Congress party emerged as the single largest party and was sworn in as Chief Minister of state on 20 February 1952. As the ministry was in minority, Shri Choudhuri had support from several Independent MLAs. In October 1956, Shri Choudhuri resigned and Shri Harekrushna Mahatab became the chief minister and continued till the end of term. At the beginning of this session, the Assembly was shifted from Cuttack to a new building known today as Sardar Patel Hall in state's New Capital, Bhubaneswar.

== House Composition ==
Party	Strength
Indian National Congress	67
All India Ganatantra Parishad	31
Socialist Party	10
Communist Party of India	7
All India Forward Bloc (Marxist Group)	1
Independent	24

== Office Bearers ==
Post	Portrait	Name	Tenure		Party
Governor		Asaf Ali	Assembly Begins	6 June 1952	N/A
Governor		Saiyid Fazl Ali	7 June 1952	9 February 1954	N/A
Governor		P. S. Kumaraswamy Raja	10 February 1954	11 September 1956	N/A
Governor		Bhim Sen Sachar	12 September 1956	Assembly Dissolves	N/A
Speaker		Nandakishore Das; MLA from Soro	6 March 1952	27 May 1957	Indian National Congress
Deputy Speaker		Maulabi Mahammed Hanif; MLA from Bhadrak	8 March 1952	4 March 1957	Indian National Congress
Leader of the House (Chief Minister)		Nabakrushna Choudhuri; MLA from Barchana	20 February 1952	19 October 1956	Indian National Congress
Leader of the House (Chief Minister)		Harekrushna Mahatab	19 October 1956	5 April 1957	Indian National Congress
Leader of Opposition		Shraddhakar Supakar; MLA from Sambalpur Rairakhol	16 February 1952	4 March 1957	Ganatantra Parishad

== Council of Ministers ==
=== Second Nabakrushna Choudhuri Ministry ===
Source
Portfolio	Portrait	Name Constituency	Tenure		Party
Chief Minister; Relief & Rehabilitation; River Valley Development; Public Relations; Works; Other departments not allocated to any Minister.		Nabakrushna Choudhuri; MLA from Barchana	20 February 1952	19 October 1956	INC
Revenue; Excise; Supply		Nabakrushna Choudhuri; MLA from Barchana	20 February 1952	26 February 1952	INC
Finance		Nabakrushna Choudhuri; MLA from Barchana	20 February 1952	7 April 1952	INC
Home		Nabakrushna Choudhuri; MLA from Barchana	20 February 1952	1 January 1954	INC
Development		Nabakrushna Choudhuri; MLA from Barchana	1 January 1954	19 October 1956	INC
Revenue (excluding Commercial Taxes); Excise; Supply		Nabakrushna Choudhuri; MLA from Barchana	22 September 1956	19 October 1956	INC
Cabinet Minister
Law; Health		Dinabandhu Sahoo; MLA from Kendrapara	20 February 1952	26 April 1954	INC
Education		Dinabandhu Sahoo; MLA from Kendrapara	20 February 1952	7 April 1952	INC
Development		Dinabandhu Sahoo; MLA from Kendrapara	20 February 1952	1 January 1954	INC
Home		Dinabandhu Sahoo; MLA from Kendrapara	1 January 1954	26 April 1954	INC
Industries; Transport		Rajbahdur Kishore Chandra Deo Bhanj; MLA from Daspalla	20 February 1952	19 October 1956	INC
Tribal & Rural Welfare; Commerce; Labour		Sonaram Soren; MLA from Bahalda	20 February 1952	19 October 1956	INC
Excise; Supply		Sadashiva Tripathy; MLA from Nowrangpur	26 February 1952	22 September 1956	INC
Revenue		Sadashiva Tripathy; MLA from Nowrangpur	26 February 1952	29 January 1954	INC
Revenue (excluding Commercial Taxes)		Sadashiva Tripathy; MLA from Nowrangpur	29 January 1954	22 September 1956	INC
Finance; Education		Radhanath Rath; MLA from Athgarh	7 April 1952	19 October 1956	INC
Home; Law; Health		Satyapriya Mohanty; MLA from Bhubaneswar	26 April 1954	19 October 1956	INC
Deputy Minister
Health		Basanta Manjari Devi; MLA from Ranpur	20 February 1952	19 October 1956	INC
Works		Bhairab Chandra Mohanty; MLA from Cuttack Rural	20 February 1952	19 October 1956	INC
Home		Nilamani Routray; MLA from Dhamnagar	20 February 1952	19 October 1956	INC
Relief & Rehabilitation; Animal Husbandry; Public Relations		Anupa Singh Deo; MLA from Nawapara	20 February 1952	19 October 1956	INC
Local Self Government in Health; Fisheries; Co-operation		Santanu Kumar Das; MLA from Jajpur	20 February 1952	19 October 1956	INC
Transport; Forest		Tirthabasi Pradhan; MLA from Baragarh	6 March 1952	19 October 1956	INC
Supply; Agriculture		Krupanidhi Naik; MLA from Sundargarh	6 March 1952	19 October 1956	INC

=== Second Harekrushna Mahatab Ministry ===
Source
Portfolio	Portrait	Name Constituency	Tenure		Party
Chief Minister; Political and Services; Finance; Education; Health; Tribal & Rural Welfare; Labour; Other departments not allocated to any Minister.		Harekrushna Mahatab; Not Elected to the Assembly	19 October 1956	5 April 1957	INC
Cabinet Minister
Works; Transport; Agriculture; Co-operation; Forestry; Supply; Commerce; Relief & Rehabilitation		Radhanath Rath; MLA from Athgarh	19 October 1956	5 April 1957	INC
Revenue; Excise; Home; Law		Satyapriya Mohanty; MLA from Bhubaneswar	19 October 1956	5 April 1957	INC
Industries; Mines & Geology		Rajbahdur Kishore Chandra Deo Bhanj; MLA from Daspalla	19 October 1956	5 April 1957	INC
Deputy Minister
Health		Basanta Manjari Devi; MLA from Ranpur	19 October 1956	5 April 1957	INC
Home; Industries		Nilamani Routray; MLA from Dhamnagar	19 October 1956	5 April 1957	INC
Agriculture; Animal Husbandry; Marketing Organisation & Supply		Krupanidhi Naik; MLA from Sundargarh	19 October 1956	5 April 1957	INC
Tribal & Rural Welfare; Labour		Anupa Singh Deo; MLA from Nawapara	19 October 1956	5 April 1957	INC
Co-operation; Fisheries; Relief & Rehabilitation		Santanu Kumar Das; MLA from Jajpur	19 October 1956	5 April 1957	INC

== Members of Legislative Assembly ==
Source
District	#	Constituency	Member	Party	Remarks
Koraput	1	Malkangiri	Laxman Gouda	Ganatantra Parishad	
Koraput	2	Padua	Ganeswar Mohapatra	Ganatantra Parishad	
Koraput	3	Nowrangpur	Sadasiba Tripathy	Indian National Congress	
Koraput	3	Nowrangpur (ST)	Mudi Naiko	Indian National Congress	
Koraput	4	Jeypur	Harihar Mishra	Ganatantra Parishad	
Koraput	4	Jeypur (ST)	Laichhan Naik	Ganatantra Parishad	
Koraput	5	Koraput (ST)	Ganga Muduli	Ganatantra Parishad	
Koraput	6	Nandapur	Bhagaban Khemundu Naik	Indian National Congress	
Koraput	7	Rayagada (ST)	Mandangi Kamaya	Indian National Congress	
Koraput	8	Bissemkatak (ST)	Syamaghana Ulaka	Ganatantra Parishad	
Koraput	9	Gunupur (ST)	Soboro Dumba	Ganatantra Parishad	Candidate returned.
Koraput	9	Gunupur (ST)	Bhagirathi Gomango	Ganatantra Parishad	Elected in 1955 bypoll.
Phulbani	10	Balliguda	Jadab Padra	Indian National Congress	
Phulbani	11	Phulbani Udayagiri	Sadanada Sahu	Independent	
Phulbani	11	Phulbani Udayagiri (ST)	Balakrishna Mallick	Independent	Died in office.
Phulbani	11	Phulbani Udayagiri (ST)	Sarangdhar Pradhan	Ganatantra Parishad	Elected in 1956 bypoll.
Phulbani	12	Baudh	Himansu Sekhar Padhi	Independent	
Dhenkanal	13	Athmallik	Dwitiya Roul	Independent	Candidate returned.
Dhenkanal	13	Athmallik	Raja Kishore Chandra Deo	Indian National Congress	Elected in 1955 bypoll.
Dhenkanal	14	Angul Hindol	Hrusikesh Tripathy	Indian National Congress	
Dhenkanal	14	Angul Hindol (ST)	Arkhit Naik	Indian National Congress	
Dhenkanal	15	Talcher	Pabitra Mohan Pradhan	Indian National Congress	
Dhenkanal	16	Pal-Lakhra-K Nagar	Mahesh Chandra Subahusingh	Indian National Congress	
Dhenkanal	16	Pal-Lakhra-K Nagar (ST)	Baidhar Naik	Indian National Congress	
Dhenkanal	17	Dhenkanal	Baisnab Charan Patnaik	Communist Party of India	
Dhenkanal	17	Dhenkanal (ST)	Madan Dehuri	Communist Party of India	
Kalahandi	18	Bhawanipatna	Jogesh Chandra Singh Deo	Ganatantra Parishad	
Kalahandi	18	Bhawanipatna (ST)	Janardhan Majhi	Ganatantra Parishad	
Kalahandi	19	Jaipatna Kasipur (ST)	Jhajuru Jhodia	Indian National Congress	
Kalahandi	20	Junagarh	Pratap Keshari Deo	Ganatantra Parishad	
Kalahandi	20	Junagarh (ST)	Dayanidhi Naik	Ganatantra Parishad	
Kalahandi	21	Nawapara	Anupa Singh Deo	Indian National Congress	
Kalahandi	21	Nawapara (ST)	Chaitan Majhi	Indian National Congress	
Bolangir	22	Titilagarh	Muralidhar Panda	Ganatantra Parishad	
Bolangir	22	Titilagarh (ST)	Ramesh Chandra Singh Bhoi	Ganatantra Parishad	
Bolangir	23	Patnaghar	Arjun Das	Ganatantra Parishad	
Bolangir	23	Patnaghar (ST)	Ganesh Ram Bariah	Ganatantra Parishad	
Bolangir	24	Bolangir	Nandakishore Mishra	Ganatantra Parishad	Resigned.
Bolangir	24	Bolangir	Nandakishore Mishra	Ganatantra Parishad	Elected in 1956 bypoll.
Bolangir	24	Bolangir (ST)	Achyutananda Mahananda	Ganatantra Parishad	
Bolangir	25	Sonepur	Anantaram Nanda	Ganatantra Parishad	
Bolangir	26	Binika	Baikuntha Nepak	Ganatantra Parishad	
Bolangir	27	Birmaharajpur	Achutananda Mahakur	Ganatantra Parishad	
Sambalpur	28	Padampur	Anirudha Mishra	Independent	
Sambalpur	28	Padampur (ST)	Lal Ranjit Singh Bariha	Indian National Congress	Died in office.
Sambalpur	28	Padampur (ST)	Bir Bikramaditya Singh Bariha	Indian National Congress	Elected in 1956 bypoll.
Sambalpur	29	Baragarh	Tirthabasi Pradhan	Indian National Congress	
Sambalpur	30	Attabira	Bipin Bihari Das	Indian National Congress	
Sambalpur	31	Sohella	Bhikari Sahu	Indian National Congress	
Sambalpur	31	Sohella (ST)	Bisi Bibhar	Indian National Congress	
Sambalpur	32	Ambabhona Mura	Makardhwaj Pradhan	Socialist Party	
Sambalpur	33	Sambalpur Rairakhol	Shraddhakar Supakar	Ganatantra Parishad	Leader of Opposition
Sambalpur	33	Sambalpur Rairakhol (ST)	Bhikari Ghasi	Ganatantra Parishad	
Sambalpur	34	Jharsuguda Rampella	Bijoy Kumar Pani	Indian National Congress	
Sambalpur	34	Jharsuguda Rampella (ST)	Manohar Singh Naik	Ganatantra Parishad	
Sambalpur	35	Bamra	Haraprasad Deb	Ganatantra Parishad	Resigned.
Sambalpur	35	Bamra	Indu Bhusan Mahanti	Ganatantra Parishad	Elected in 1955 bypoll.
Sambalpur	35	Bamra (ST)	Jayadev Thakur	Ganatantra Parishad	
Sundargarh	36	Sundargarh	Krupanidhi Naik	Indian National Congress	
Sundargarh	36	Sundargarh (ST)	Dwarikanath Kusum	Ganatantra Parishad	
Sundargarh	37	Rajgangpur (ST)	Agapit Lakra	Indian National Congress	
Sundargarh	38	Bisra (ST)	Madan Mohan Amat	Indian National Congress	
Sundargarh	39	Bonai (ST)	Nilamani Singh Dandapat	Ganatantra Parishad	
Keonjhar	40	Champua (ST)	Gurucharan Naik	Ganatantra Parishad	
Keonjhar	41	Keonjhar	Laxmi Narayan Bhanja Deo	Independent	
Keonjhar	41	Keonjhar (ST)	Govind Chandra Munda	Ganatantra Parishad	
Keonjhar	42	Anandapur	Janardan Bhanj Deo	Independent	
Keonjhar	42	Anandapur (ST)	Bhaiga Sethi	Independent	
Mayurbhanj	43	Panchpir	Biswanath Sahu	Ganatantra Parishad	
Mayurbhanj	43	Panchpir (ST)	Ghasiram Sandil	Independent	
Mayurbhanj	44	Kaptipada (ST)	Harachand Hansada	Socialist Party	
Mayurbhanj	45	Khunta (ST)	Sakila Soren	Socialist Party	
Mayurbhanj	46	Baripada	Girish Chandra Roy	Socialist Party	
Mayurbhanj	46	Baripada (ST)	Surendra Singh	Indian National Congress	
Mayurbhanj	47	Bahalda (ST)	Sunaram Soren	Indian National Congress	
Mayurbhanj	48	Rairangpur (ST)	Haradeb Triya	Indian National Congress	
Mayurbhanj	49	Bangriposhi (ST)	Jadav Majhi	Indian National Congress	
Mayurbhanj	50	Muruda	Prasanna Kumar Dash	Socialist Party	
Balasore	51	Jaleswar	Karunakar Panigrahi	Indian National Congress	
Balasore	52	Bhograi	Sashikanta Bhanj	Independent	
Balasore	53	Basta	Trilochan Senapati	Indian National Congress	
Balasore	54	Soro	Nandakishore Das	Indian National Congress	Speaker
Balasore	55	Balasore	Surendra Nath Das	Indian National Congress	
Balasore	56	Nilgiri	Nilambar Das	Indian National Congress	
Balasore	56	Nilgiri (ST)	Chaitanya Prasad Sethi	Indian National Congress	
Balasore	57	Bhadrak	Mahamad Hanif	Indian National Congress	Deputy Speaker
Balasore	58	Banth	Gokulananda Mohanty	Indian National Congress	
Balasore	59	Dhamnagar	Nilamani Routray	Indian National Congress	
Balasore	60	Chandbali	Chakradhar Behera	Indian National Congress	
Balasore	60	Chandbali (ST)	Brundabana Das	Indian National Congress	
Cuttack	61	Sukinda	Pitambar Bhupati Harichandan Mohapatra	Independent	Candidate returned.
Cuttack	61	Sukinda	Narayan Chandra Pati	Praja Socialist Party	Elected in 1955 bypoll.
Cuttack	62	Jajpur	Gadadhar Dutta	Indian National Congress	
Cuttack	62	Jajpur (ST)	Santanu Kumar Das	Indian National Congress	
Cuttack	63	Dharamsala	Paramanada Mohanty	Socialist Party	
Cuttack	64	Binjharpur	Padmanava Roy	Indian National Congress	
Cuttack	64	Binjharpur (ST)	Naba Kishore Mallick	Indian National Congress	
Cuttack	64	Barchana	Nabakrushna Choudhuri	Indian National Congress	Chief Minister
Cuttack	66	Aul	Raja Sailendra Narayan Bhanja Deo	Independent	
Cuttack	67	Patamundai	Ram Raj Kumari	Independent	
Cuttack	68	Rajnagar	Saraswati Devi	Indian National Congress	
Cuttack	69	Kendrapara	Dinabandhu Sahoo	Indian National Congress	Candidate returned.
Cuttack	69	Kendrapara	Purusottam Nayak	Indian National Congress	Elected in 1955 bypoll.
Cuttack	70	Patkura	Lokanath Mishra	Indian National Congress	
Cuttack	71	Tirtol	Nishamani Khuntia	Socialist Party	
Cuttack	72	Ersama	Gourishyam Naik	Indian National Congress	
Cuttack	73	Balikuda	Prana Krushna Parija	Independent	
Cuttack	74	Jagatsinghpur	Nilamani Pradhan	Indian National Congress	
Cuttack	75	Kissennagar	Rajkrushna Bose	Indian National Congress	
Cuttack	76	Salepur	Surendranath Patnaik	Indian National Congress	
Cuttack	76	Salepur (ST)	Purnanda Samal	Indian National Congress	
Cuttack	77	Mahanga	Mahammad Attahar	Indian National Congress	Candidate returned.
Cuttack	77	Mahanga	Pradipta Kishore Das	Praja Socialist Party	Elected in 1955 bypoll.
Cuttack	78	Cuttack Town	Biren Mitra	Indian National Congress	
Cuttack	79	Cuttack Rural	Bhairab Chandra Mohanty	Indian National Congress	
Cuttack	79	Cuttack Rural (ST)	Laxman Mallick	Indian National Congress	
Cuttack	80	Banki	Gokulanand Praharaj	Socialist Party	
Cuttack	81	Narasinghpur	Brundaban Sahu	Ganatantra Parishad	
Cuttack	82	Athgarh	Radhanath Rath	Indian National Congress	
Puri	83	Kakatpur Nimapara	Upendra Mohanty	Indian National Congress	
Puri	83	Kakatpur Nimapara (ST)	Gobinda Chandra Sethi	Indian National Congress	
Puri	84	Satyabadi	Nilakantha Das	Independent	
Puri	85	Pipili	Jayakrushna Mohanty	Indian National Congress	
Puri	86	Puri	Fakir Charan Das	Socialist Party	
Puri	87	Bramhagiri	Biswanath Parida	Independent	
Puri	88	Banpur	Godabarish Mishra	Independent	
Puri	89	Bhubaneswar	Satapriya Mohanty	Indian National Congress	Candidate returned.
Puri	89	Bhubaneswar	Satapriya Mohanty	Indian National Congress	Elected in 1955 bypoll.
Puri	89	Bhubaneswar (ST)	Kanhu Mallik	Indian National Congress	Candidate returned.
Puri	89	Bhubaneswar (ST)	Kanhu Mallik	Indian National Congress	Elected in 1955 bypoll.
Puri	90	Khurda	Madhab Chandra Routray	Indian National Congress	
Puri	91	Begunia	Gangadhar Paikray	Communist Party of India	
Puri	92	Ranpur	Basanta Manjari Devi	Indian National Congress	
Puri	93	Nayagarh	Raja Saheb Krushna Chandra Singh Mandhata	Independent	
Puri	94	Khandapara	Raja Saheb Harihar Singh Mardraj Bhramabara Roy	Independent	
Puri	95	Daspalla	Rajabahadur Kishore Chandra Deo Bhanj	Indian National Congress	
Ganjam	96	Jaganathprasad	Biju Patnaik	Indian National Congress	
Ganjam	97	Russelkonda	Dinabandhu Behera	Indian National Congress	
Ganjam	98	Aska	Harihar Das	Communist Party of India	
Ganjam	98	Aska (ST)	Mohan Naik	Communist Party of India	
Ganjam	99	Khallikote	Ramachandra Mardaraj Dev	Independent	
Ganjam	100	Kudula	Banamali Maharana	Socialist Party	
Ganjam	101	Purusottampur	Harihar Das	Indian National Congress	
Ganjam	102	Chhatrapur	Sitaramaya V.	Independent	
Ganjam	103	Pattapur	Govind Pradhan	Communist Party of India	
Ganjam	104	Berhampur	Ramachandra Mishra	Independent	Candidate returned.
Ganjam	104	Berhampur	Brundaban Nayak	Indian National Congress	Elected in 1955 bypoll.
Ganjam	104	Berhampur (ST)	Dandapani Das	Independent	
Ganjam	105	Patrapur	Dibakar Patnaik	All India Forward Bloc	
Ganjam	106	Parlakhelmundi	Jaganath Mishra	Communist Party of India	
Ganjam	106	Parlakhelmundi (ST)	Apenna Dora Biswasrai	Independent	
Ganjam	107	Udayagiri Mohana (ST)	Pattu Maliko	Indian National Congress	

== Bypolls ==
Source
Year	Constituency	Reason for by-poll	Winning candidate	Party
till July 1955	Gunupur (ST)	Candidate returned	Bhagirathi Gomango	Ganatantra Parishad
till July 1955	Athmallik	Candidate returned	Raja Kishore Chandra Deo	Indian National Congress
till July 1955	Mahanga	Candidate returned	Pradipta Kishore Das	Praja Socialist Party
till July 1955	Bhubaneswar	Candidate returned	Satapriya Mohanty	Indian National Congress
till July 1955	Bhubaneswar (ST)	Candidate returned	Kanhu Mallik	Indian National Congress
till July 1955	Berhampur	Candidate returned	Brundaban Nayak	Indian National Congress
till July 1955	Bamra	Resignation of Haraprasad Deb	Indu Bhusan Mahanti	Ganatantra Parishad
till July 1955	Sukinda	Candidate returned	Narayan Chandra Pati	Praja Socialist Party
till July 1955	Kendrapara	Candidate returned	Purusottam Nayak	Indian National Congress
July 1955 - October 1956	Phulbani Udayagiri (ST)	Death of Balakrishna Mallick	Sarangdhar Pradhan	Ganatantra Parishad
July 1955 - October 1956	Padampur (ST)	Death of Lal Ranjit Singh Bariha	Bir Bikramaditya Singh Bariha	Indian National Congress
July 1955 - October 1956	Bolangir	Resignation of Nandakishore Mishra	Nandakishore Mishra	Ganatantra Parishad
