= 1952 Orissa Legislative Assembly election =

First legislative assembly election in Orissa, India (1951–1952)

- December 20, 1951 to January 24, 1952

All 140 seats across 107 constituencies to the 1st Orissa Legislative Assembly 71 seats needed for a majority
- Registered: 7,598,161
- Turnout: 34.19%
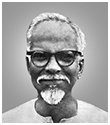

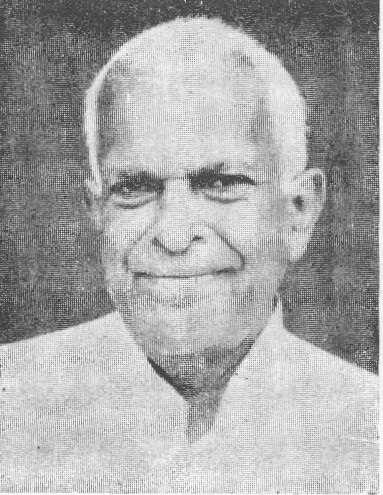

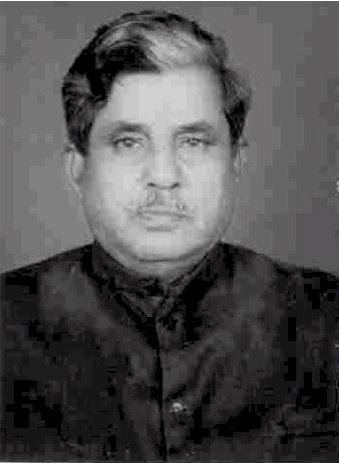

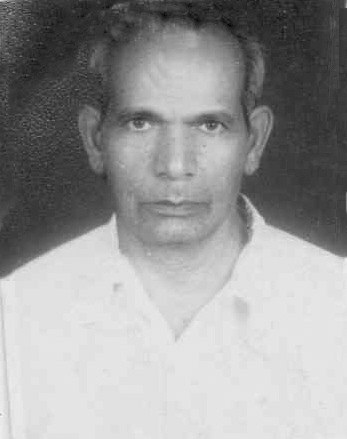

	Majority party	Minority party	Third party
Leader	Nabakrushna Choudhuri	Shraddhakar Supakar	Prasanna Kumar Dash
Party	Indian National Congress	All India Ganatantra Parishad	Socialist Party
Leader since	12 May 1950	December 1951	1949
Leader's seat	Barchana	Sambalpur–Rairakhol	Morada
Last election	N/A	New party	New party
Seats won	67	31	10
Seat change	N/A	▲31	▲10
popular vote	1,392,501	753,685	432,731
Percentage	37.87%	20.50%	11.77%
Swing	▲37.87 pp	▲20.50 pp	▲11.77 pp
	Fourth party	Fifth party	Sixth party
Leader	Gangadhar Paikaray	Dibakar Patnaik
Party	Communist Party of India	Forward Bloc (Marxist Group)	Independents
Leader since	December 1951	December 1951
Leader's seat	Begunia	Patrapur
Last election	N/A	New party
Seats won	7	1	24
Seat change	▲6	▲1
popular vote	206,757	12,874	858,771
Percentage	5.62%	0.35%	22.94%
Swing	▲5.62 pp	▲0.35 pp
- Composition of the 1st Orissa Legislative Assembly after the election
Chief Minister before election
Nabakrushna Choudhuri
INC
Elected Chief Minister
Nabakrushna Choudhuri
INC

The 1952 Orissa Legislative Assembly election was held from 20 December 1951 to 24 January 1952 to elect 140 members to the 1st Orissa Legislative Assembly. Conducted concurrently with the first parliamentary elections, it was the inaugural assembly election in the state of Orissa to be held under universal adult suffrage following the adoption of the Constitution of India. The election marked the first democratic exercise since the 1948–1949 integration of 24 Garhjat princely states into the province, an administrative merger that nearly doubled the state's territorial size and electorate. To ensure representation for Scheduled Castes and Scheduled Tribes, the 140 seats were allocated across 107 constituencies, comprising 74 single-member seats and 33 two-member constituencies.

The election resulted in a hung assembly. The ruling Indian National Congress (INC), led by incumbent Chief Minister Nabakrushna Choudhuri, emerged as the single largest party, winning 67 seats and 37.87% of the popular vote, but fell four seats short of the 71-seat majority threshold. The newly formed All India Ganatantra Parishad (AIGP)—spearheaded by former princely rulers who campaigned on regional and anti-merger grievances—swept the western interior highlands to become the principal opposition, securing 31 seats (20.50%). The Socialist Party and the Communist Party of India established legislative footholds with 10 and 7 seats, respectively. Unaligned independent candidates emerged as pivotal power brokers, collectively capturing 24 seats and 23.43% of the statewide vote.

On 20 February 1952, Nabakrushna Choudhuri successfully formed his second ministry with the outside support of independent legislators. The newly constituted Assembly convened for its inaugural sitting in Bhubaneswar on 4 March 1952. Choudhuri governed until October 1956, when he resigned amidst widespread political unrest surrounding the States Reorganisation Commission's redrawing of state borders; he was succeeded by Harekrushna Mahatab for the remainder of the assembly's five-year term.

== Background ==
=== Colonial-era legislatures (1936–1947) ===
Orissa became a separate province of British India on 1 April 1936 under the Government of India (Constitution of Orissa) Order, 1936. The province was carved out of Odia-speaking tracts previously administered within the Bihar and Orissa Province, the Madras Presidency, and the Central Provinces. The 26 Garhjat princely states of the region, however, remained outside provincial jurisdiction under the Eastern States Agency.

Under the Government of India Act 1935, a unicameral Orissa Legislative Assembly of 60 members (56 elected under a restricted franchise based on property, tax, and educational qualifications, alongside 4 nominated members) was established. In the April 1946 provincial election—the last held prior to independence—the Indian National Congress won 47 of the 60 seats (including 36 uncontested returns), while the All-India Muslim League won 4, the Communist Party of India won 1, Independents won 4, and 4 members were nominated. Harekrushna Mahatab formed a Congress ministry on 23 April 1946.

=== Integration of the princely states (1947–1950) ===
Following India's independence in August 1947, the political integration of the princely states fundamentally reshaped the territory and demography of Orissa. In December 1947, rulers of 25 Eastern States signed merger agreements transferring the administration of their states to the Government of Orissa with effect from 1 January 1948. Mayurbhanj, which had initially remained outside the arrangement, merged with Orissa on 1 January 1949, whereas the states of Seraikela and Kharsawan were transferred to Bihar in May 1948. The integration of the 24 princely states nearly doubled the geographic area and population of Orissa, bringing the interior highlands and large Scheduled Tribe (Adivasi) populations under unified provincial administration.

As an interim arrangement under the Administration of Orissa Order, 1948, a 36-member consultative body known as the "Orissa States Assembly" (comprising 31 nominees from the merged states and 5 ex officio executive members) functioned alongside the 60-member provincial legislature. Under the States' Merger (Governors' Provinces) Order, 1949, the strength of the 2nd Orissa Provincial Assembly was formally expanded from 60 to 91 seats in August 1949, and on 9 September 1949 the Governor-General of India nominated 31 representatives from the former princely states to the unicameral house. On 12 May 1950, when Harekrushna Mahatab resigned to join the Union Cabinet as Minister of Industry and Supply, Nabakrushna Choudhuri succeeded him as Chief Minister and led the interim administration into the 1951–52 general election. The transitional legislature held 14 sessions (including a three-day sitting in the new capital of Bhubaneswar in October 1949) before being dissolved on 20 February 1952.

=== Transition to universal suffrage and rise of the Ganatantra Parishad ===
The Constitution of India, which came into effect on 26 January 1950, designated Orissa a Part A State and mandated direct elections to state legislative assemblies on the basis of universal adult suffrage for all citizens aged 21 and above under Article 326. Across India, the transition from colonial-era restricted rolls (which had enfranchised roughly 14% of the population) to universal suffrage expanded the electorate more than threefold.

Politically, the abolition of princely prerogatives, disputes over privy purses and forestry rights, and resentment in the western interior against perceived coastal administrative dominance catalysed a major regional opposition movement. In October 1950, Rajendra Narayan Singh Deo (the former Maharaja of Patna State) and Pratap Keshari Deo (the former Maharaja of Kalahandi State) founded the All India Ganatantra Parishad (AIGP) at Bolangir. Meanwhile, on the left, the Socialist Party, the Communist Party of India, and the Kisan Mazdoor Praja Party (founded in 1951 by dissident Congressmen) mobilised peasant and tenant-farmer (bhagchasi) movements across the coastal districts against the zamindari system.

== Electoral system, constituencies, and schedule ==
=== Allocation of seats and delimitation ===
Under Article 170 of the Constitution and Section 7 of the Representation of the People Act, 1950, the total number of seats in each Part A State Legislative Assembly was fixed as an integral multiple of its representation in the House of the People. Orissa was allotted 20 seats in the House of the People and a multiple of 7 for its Legislative Assembly, fixing the strength of the 1st Orissa Legislative Assembly at 140 elected seats (with a minimum constitutional threshold of one seat per 75,000 population).

To prevent partisan gerrymandering and account for demographic changes since the 1941 Census, the President issued the Constitution (Determination of Population) Order, 1950, estimating each state's population as of 1 March 1950. Orissa was one of eight states in which the Election Commission and the state Parliamentary Advisory Committee reached unanimous agreement on constituency boundaries. Following parliamentary modifications notified on 13 August 1951, the Delimitation of Parliamentary and Assembly Constituencies (Orissa) Order, 1951 divided the state's 13 districts into 107 territorial constituencies returning 140 members.

Distribution of the 140 seats in the 1st Orissa Legislative Assembly by constituency and reservation category
1. Single-member General (58) (41.4%)
2. Two-member General (33) (23.6%)
3. Two-member Scheduled Caste (21) (15.0%)
4. Single-member Scheduled Tribe (16) (11.4%)
5. Two-member Scheduled Tribe (12) (8.57%)

=== Reservation and the two-member constituency system ===
Under Article 332 of the Constitution, seats were reserved for Scheduled Castes and Scheduled Tribes in proportion to their share of the state's population, resulting in 21 seats reserved for Scheduled Castes (SC) and 28 seats reserved for Scheduled Tribes (ST)—a combined 49 reserved seats (35.0% of the 140-member House). Because the Election Commission reserved single-member constituencies only where a scheduled community constituted an outright demographic majority, the two categories were structured differently:

- Single-member constituencies (74 constituencies; 74 seats): Comprised 58 unreserved (General) constituencies and 16 constituencies reserved exclusively for Scheduled Tribes in heavily tribal pockets of Koraput, Phulbani, Kalahandi, Sundargarh, Keonjhar, Mayurbhanj, and Ganjam.
- Two-member constituencies (33 constituencies; 66 seats): Because the Scheduled Caste population was geographically dispersed across the state rather than concentrated in majority enclaves, all 21 SC seats—along with the remaining 12 ST seats—were paired with unreserved seats inside 33 two-member constituencies, each approximately double the population and area of a single-member seat.

In the 33 two-member constituencies, elections were conducted via distributive plural voting. Each elector was issued two chocolate-barred Assembly ballot papers bearing the same serial number—one plain and one marked with the suffix "A"—and was entitled to cast two non-cumulative votes into separate candidate ballot boxes. If an elector dropped both ballot papers into the same candidate's box, the duplicate ballot was rejected during counting as an illegal cumulative vote. During counting, the Returning Officer first declared the Scheduled Caste or Scheduled Tribe candidate with the highest vote tally elected to the reserved seat; thereafter, whichever remaining candidate (whether general or belonging to a scheduled community) held the highest vote tally was declared elected to the unreserved seat.

Constituency, seat, and electorate breakdown in the 1952 Orissa Legislative Assembly election
Constituency category	No. of constituencies	Seats allotted				Registered electors	Valid votes polled
Constituency category	No. of constituencies	General	SC	ST	Total seats	Registered electors	Valid votes polled
Single-member General	58	58	0	0	58	3,112,233	3,434,962 (Note: In the ECI's Electors Data Summary (page 9 of the 1951 Orissa Statistical Report), the 3,434,962 valid votes polled across the 58 single-member General and 33 two-member constituencies are reported as a combined figure under the "GEN" column.)
Two-member (General + SC/ST)	33	33	21	12	66	3,618,028	3,434,962
Single-member Scheduled Tribe (ST)	16	0	0	16	16	867,900	242,084 (Note: In row 3 ("Electors who voted") of the ECI's Electors Data Summary table (page 9 of the 1951 Orissa Statistical Report), a typographical error repeated the total ST registered electorate (867,900; 100.00%) in place of the actual votes polled in the 15 contested ST single-member constituencies (242,084, as correctly recorded in row 5 "Valid votes"), artificially inflating the printed "Electors who voted" sum to 4,302,862 (38.36%). On the Highlights page (page 3), the ECI correctly recorded total votes polled and valid votes as 3,677,046 out of 10,753,175 exercisable votes (34.19%).)
Total	107	91	21	28	140	7,598,161	3,677,046 (Note: Because electors in contested two-member constituencies possessed two votes each, the total number of exercisable votes across all contested seats was 10,753,175, yielding an overall ballot turnout of 34.19%.)

=== Schedule and election administration ===
Preliminary electoral rolls for Orissa were published on 31 March 1951—including bilingual rolls in border tracts—and finalized between September and November 1951 after the disposal of claims and objections by judicial Revising Authorities. Because general literacy stood at approximately 16.6% nationally, the Election Commission adopted the ballot-box symbol system rather than marked ballot papers. For Orissa, 88,856 tamper-resistant steel ballot boxes (painted in shades of chocolate, mahogany, teak, dark tan, or bronze to distinguish Assembly boxes from olive-green Parliamentary boxes) were procured, including boxes manufactured locally by Kalinga Refrigerators Ltd. in Cuttack and emergency supplies rushed by Godrej & Boyce from Bombay after a Calcutta supplier defaulted in October 1951.

Polling in Orissa was staggered across 36 days from 20 December 1951 to 24 January 1952 to allow mobile polling parties and police escorts to traverse the forested and mountainous interior districts from one polling station to the next. Voting at each station was conducted continuously for eight hours without a midday break, and every voter's left forefinger was marked with indelible ink developed by the Council of Scientific and Industrial Research.

Key dates of the 1951–52 Orissa Legislative Assembly election
Stage	Date(s)
Preliminary publication of draft electoral rolls	31 March 1951
Notification of parliamentary amendments to the Delimitation Order	13 August 1951
Polling period (staggered across constituencies)	20 December 1951 – 24 January 1952 (36 days)
Dissolution of the 2nd Orissa Provincial Assembly & constitution of the 1st Orissa Legislative Assembly	20 February 1952
Swearing-in of the Second Nabakrushna Choudhuri ministry	20 February 1952
Administration of oath to MLAs and inaugural sitting at Town Hall (now Sardar Patel Hall), Bhubaneswar	4 March 1952
Election of Speaker (Nandakishore Das) and Deputy Speaker (Mahammed Hanif)	6 March & 8 March 1952
Administrative compilation date on the ECI Statistical Report	27 March 1952

== Political parties and candidates ==
=== Participating parties and symbols ===
Under the symbol reservation framework adopted by the Election Commission in August–September 1951, ten political parties contested the election in Orissa: six recognized National Parties, one recognized State Party, and three registered unrecognised parties, alongside independent candidates. The All India Ganatantra Parishad had applied to the Election Commission for recognition as a National Party, but the Commission declined the request and recognized it as a State Party in Orissa with the reserved symbol of a Bow and arrow. In two-member constituencies, a recognized party's candidate for the reserved SC or ST seat was allotted the party's standard symbol enclosed within a thick black circle so voters could distinguish between the party's general and reserved ballot boxes.

=== Nominations and candidate distribution ===
Across the 107 constituencies, a total of 684 nominations were filed; of these, 52 nomination papers were rejected during scrutiny and 115 candidates withdrew their candidatures. Five Congress candidates were declared elected unopposed—one in the single-member Balliguda (ST) constituency (Jadab Padra) and four in the reserved seats of the two-member constituencies of Nowrangpur (Mudi Naiko, ST), Angul–Hindol (Arakhit Naik, SC), Pallahara–K. Nagar (Baidhar Naik, SC), and Baripada (Surendra Singh, ST)—leaving 517 candidates contesting the remaining 135 seats across 106 constituencies (522 total candidates including the 5 uncontested returns, an average of nearly 5 candidates per constituency). Balliguda (ST) had the fewest candidates (1, elected uncontested), while the two-member Aska constituency in Ganjam district had the highest number of candidates (15).

Candidates fielded by party (Total: 522)
Party	Candidates
Independents	204
INC	135
Socialist Party	79
Ganatantra Parishad	58
CPI	33
KMPP	7
Forward Bloc (MG)	2
Forward Bloc (RG)	1
People's Independent Party	1
Pursharathi Panchayat	1
Radical Democratic Party	1

The ruling Indian National Congress contested 135 of the 140 seats, leaving only five seats uncontested by the party. The Socialist Party fielded 79 candidates, primarily in the coastal districts and Mayurbhanj district, while the All India Ganatantra Parishad fielded 58 candidates concentrated in the western and interior highland districts. The Communist Party of India, led in the assembly by Gangadhar Paikaray, fielded 33 candidates, focusing on agrarian strongholds in Ganjam, Puri, Cuttack, and Dhenkanal. Out of the 522 total candidates, 220 (42.15%) failed to secure the statutory minimum threshold of votes and forfeited their security deposits, including all 7 candidates of the Kisan Mazdoor Praja Party and 133 of the 204 independent candidates.

Political parties contesting the 1952 Orissa Legislative Assembly election
Party	Abbr.	Recognition status	Election symbol	Assembly leader / prominent figure	Seats contested	Forfeited deposits
Indian National Congress	INC	National Party		Nabakrushna Choudhuri	135	14
Socialist Party	SP	National Party		Prasanna Kumar Dash	79	39
All India Ganatantra Parishad	GP	State Party		Shraddhakar Supakar / Rajendra Narayan Singh Deo	58	10
Communist Party of India	CPI	National Party		Gangadhar Paikaray	33	14
Kisan Mazdoor Praja Party	KMPP	National Party		J. B. Kripalani	7	7
Forward Bloc (Marxist Group)	FBL(MG)	National Party		Dibakar Patnaik	2	1
Forward Bloc (Ruikar Group)	FBL(RG)	National Party		Upendranath Barik	1	1
People's Independent Party	PIP	Registered (Unrecognised)	Free symbol	Jadumani Mangaraj	1	0
Pursharathi Panchayat	PP	Registered (Unrecognised)	Free symbol	Kapileswar Prasad	1	0
Radical Democratic Party	RAD	Registered (Unrecognised)	Free symbol	Allurallu Dharama Rao	1	1
Independents	IND	—	Free symbols	Various	204	133
Total					522	220

== Campaign ==
The 1951–52 campaign in Orissa was shaped by the contrasting political histories of the coastal plains—which had experienced decades of anti-colonial nationalist mobilisation under British rule—and the newly integrated Garhjat highland territories, where politics revolved around post-merger administrative grievances and traditional loyalties.

=== Indian National Congress ===
Led by Chief Minister Nabakrushna Choudhuri and state Congress leaders including Harekrushna Mahatab, Biju Patnaik, Radhanath Rath, and Nityananda Kanungo, the Indian National Congress campaigned on its record of achieving independence, integrating the princely states, and initiating large-scale modernisation projects. A central plank of the Congress campaign was agrarian reform, specifically the passage of the Orissa Estates Abolition Act, 1951, which sought to abolish the intermediary zamindari system, alongside tenancy protection laws such as the Orissa Tenants Protection Act, 1948. Choudhuri, a prominent Gandhian socialist associated with the Sarvodaya and Bhoodan movements, also emphasised the construction of the multipurpose Hirakud Dam across the Mahanadi river, the building of the new state capital at Bhubaneswar, and welfare programmes for Adivasi (Scheduled Tribe) and Dalit (Scheduled Caste) communities.

However, the Congress organisation suffered from internal factionalism and defections prior to the poll. Several veteran nationalists—including Nilakantha Das and Godabarish Mishra—had broken away from the party, while another group of dissident Congressmen joined J. B. Kripalani's Kisan Mazdoor Praja Party (KMPP) or contested as independents.

=== All India Ganatantra Parishad ===
The All India Ganatantra Parishad (AIGP), led by Rajendra Narayan Singh Deo (former ruler of Patna State) and Pratap Keshari Deo (former ruler of Kalahandi State) alongside Sambalpur lawyer Shraddhakar Supakar, mounted a formidable regional challenge across western and interior Orissa. Growing out of the Koshal Utkal Praja Parishad formed at Sambalpur in October 1948 and reorganised as the Ganatantra Parishad at Bolangir in October 1950, the party united former ruling chiefs, zamindars, gountias (village headmen), and tribal leaders.

In its election manifesto, the Ganatantra Parishad promised to guarantee every cultivator an economic holding of land, restore traditional nistar (customary forest and grazing) rights that had been curtailed after the merger, and decentralise administration. In Sambalpur district, Shraddhakar Supakar and the AIGP spearheaded the anti-Hirakud agitation, campaigning on the grievances of thousands of families facing displacement and inadequate rehabilitation in the Hirakud Dam reservoir area. Leveraging the personal authority of the former rajas among tribal and rural voters, the AIGP concentrated its 58 candidates in the western highlands and interior ex-state pockets.

=== Left parties ===
The Socialist Party, led in the state by Surendranath Dwivedy, Prasanna Kumar Dash, Nishamani Khuntia, and Rabindra Mohan Das, fielded 79 candidates—the second-highest number after the Congress. The Socialists campaigned for the immediate redistribution of land without compensation to landlords, the abolition of land revenue on uneconomic holdings, and the expansion of rural cooperatives, drawing strong support in Mayurbhanj district, Cuttack district, and parts of Puri district and Ganjam district.

The Communist Party of India (CPI), led by Gangadhar Paikaray, Baishnab Charan Patnaik, Prananath Patnaik, and Govind Pradhan, contested 33 seats. Emerging from peasant struggles against zamindari exactions in Ganjam district (such as the ryot agitations in Aska, Surada, and Parlakhemundi), bhagchasi (sharecropper) movements in Puri district and Cuttack district, and the anti-feudal Prajamandal movement in Dhenkanal, the CPI focused its campaign on agrarian radicalism and labour rights.

== Results ==
=== Summary ===
Polling across the 106 contested constituencies recorded 3,677,046 valid votes out of 10,753,175 exercisable ballots, representing an overall ballot turnout of 34.19%. No single party secured the 71 seats needed for an absolute majority in the 140-member House, resulting in a hung assembly.

Popular vote share by party (1952)
INC	37.87%
Independents	22.94%
AIGP	20.50%
Socialist Party	11.77%
CPI	5.62%
KMPP	0.46%
Forward Bloc (MG)	0.35%
Others (4 parties)	0.49%

Seat share in the Assembly (Total: 140)
INC (67)	47.86%
AIGP (31)	22.14%
Independents (24)	17.14%
Socialist Party (10)	7.14%
CPI (7)	5.00%
Forward Bloc (MG) (1)	0.71%

The Indian National Congress emerged as the single largest party including five candidates returned uncontested—and 1,392,501 votes (37.87% of total valid votes; 38.20% in the 135 seats it contested). The All India Ganatantra Parishad finished second and 753,685 votes (20.50% statewide), achieving the highest vote share per contested seat of any party at 43.38% across the 58 seats it fought.

The Socialist Party won 10 seats with 432,731 votes (11.77%), while the Communist Party of India won 7 seats with 206,757 votes (5.62%) and the Forward Bloc (Marxist Group) won 1 seat with 12,874 votes (0.35%). None of the candidates fielded by the Kisan Mazdoor Praja Party (7 candidates; 16,948 votes), the Forward Bloc (Ruikar Group) (1 candidate; 2,779 votes), or the three registered unrecognised parties—the People's Independent Party (11,895 votes), the Pursharathi Panchayat (1,841 votes), and the Radical Democratic Party (1,589 votes)—won a seat. Independent candidates won 24 seats (17.14% of the House) and polled 843,446 votes (22.94% statewide), making them the second-largest voting bloc after the Congress.

Summary of results of the 1952 Orissa Legislative Assembly election
Parties	Symbol	No. Of Seats Won	No. Of Seats Contested	Votes	% of votes
Parties Contending for State Govt Formation
Indian National Congress		67	135	1,392,501	37.87%
All India Ganatantra Parishad		31	58	753,685	20.50%
Socialist Party		10	79	432,731	11.77%
Other Parties
Communist Party of India		8	35	219,631	5.97%
Kisan Mazdoor Praja Party		0	7	16,948	0.46%
Independents
Independent		24	208	858,771	23.43%
Total			140	3,677,046	100%

=== Results by district ===
At the time of the 1951–52 election, Orissa was divided into 13 administrative districts. The table below summarises the distribution of constituencies, seats, and winning parties across all 13 districts:

District-wise seat distribution in the 1952 Orissa Legislative Assembly election
Sl. No.	District (1951–52)	Constituencies (Single / Two-member)	Total seats	Seats won by party					
Sl. No.	District (1951–52)	Constituencies (Single / Two-member)	Total seats	INC	GP	SP	CPI	FBL(MG)	IND
1	Koraput (#1–9)	9 (7 / 2)	11	4	7	0	0	0	0
2	Phulbani (#10–12)	3 (2 / 1)	4	1	0	0	0	0	3
3	Dhenkanal (#13–17)	5 (2 / 3)	8	5	0	0	2	0	1
4	Kalahandi (#18–21)	4 (1 / 3)	7	3	4	0	0	0	0
5	Bolangir (#22–27)	6 (3 / 3)	9	0	9	0	0	0	0
6	Sambalpur (#28–35)	8 (3 / 5)	13	6	5	1	0	0	1
7	Sundargarh (#36–39)	4 (3 / 1)	5	3	2	0	0	0	0
8	Keonjhar (#40–42)	3 (1 / 2)	5	0	2	0	0	0	3
9	Mayurbhanj (#43–50)	8 (6 / 2)	10	4	1	4	0	0	1
10	Balasore (#51–60)	10 (8 / 2)	12	11	0	0	0	0	1
11	Cuttack (#61–82)	22 (18 / 4)	26	18	1	3	0	0	4
12	Puri (#83–95)	13 (11 / 2)	15	8	0	1	1	0	5
13	Ganjam (#96–107)	12 (9 / 3)	15	4	0	1	4	1	5
—	Total	107 (74 / 33)	140	67	31	10	7	1	24

== Elected members ==
Constituency-wise elected members and runners-up in the 1952 Orissa Legislative Assembly election
#	Constituency	Turnout (%)	Winner				Runner-up				Margin	
#	Constituency	Turnout (%)	Candidate	Party	Votes	%	Candidate	Party	Votes	%	Votes	%
Koraput District
1	Malkangiri	23.30	Laxman Gouda	GP	6,090	51.28	Radhamohan Sahu	INC	3,244	27.32	2,846	23.96
2	Padua	27.57	Ganeswar Mohapatra	GP	9,982	60.46	Kailash Chandra Nanda	INC	5,970	36.16	4,012	24.30
3	Nowrangpur	49.82	Sadasiba Tripathy	INC	40,626	65.95	Rama Chandra Chodhury	GP	18,358	29.80	22,268	36.15
3	Nowrangpur (ST)	49.82	Mudi Naiko	INC	Elected uncontested as only ST candidate							
4	Jeypur	27.51 (Note: In the ECI statistical report for #4 Jeypur, a printing error omitted the final digit of the registered electorate (printing 12,261 instead of ~122,610), which caused the report to print an anomalous turnout of 275.13% (67,468 valid votes across two seats). As electors in two-member seats had two votes each, the 67,468 valid votes cast by ~122,610 electors mathematically resolves to a ballot turnout of 27.51%.)	Harihar Mishra	GP	19,076	28.27	Biayadhar Singh Deo	INC	16,045	23.78	3,031	4.49
4	Jeypur (ST)	27.51	Laichhan Naik	GP	13,856	20.54	Dulova Hontal	INC	12,136	17.99	1,720	2.55
5	Koraput (ST)	24.97	Ganga Muduli	GP	7,404	65.03	R. Ch. Naik	INC	3,982	34.97	3,422	30.05
6	Nandapur	36.05	Bhagaban Khemundu Naik	INC	8,132	48.85	Biswanath Uttarkabat	GP	5,887	35.36	2,245	13.49
7	Rayagada (ST)	24.31	Mandangi Kamaya	INC	9,049	61.57	Bisimajhi Prahalad	GP	5,649	38.43	3,400	23.13
8	Bissemkatak (ST)	17.83	Syamaghana Ulaka	GP	6,786	61.55	Kadraka Malati	INC	4,239	38.45	2,547	23.10
9	Gunupur (ST)	21.84	Soboro Dumba	GP	5,330	52.15	Ram Murty	IND	4,119	40.30	1,211	11.85
Phulbani District
10	Balliguda (ST)	—	Jadab Padra	INC	Elected uncontested							
11	Phulbani Udayagiri (ST)	17.40	Balakrishna Mallick	IND	11,112	25.89	Ugri Mallick	IND	5,490	12.79	5,622	13.10
11	Phulbani Udayagiri	17.40	Sadanada Sahu	IND	6,067	14.14	Antaryami Mallick	INC	5,033	11.73	1,034	2.41
12	Baudh	30.23	Himansu Sekhar Padhi	IND	6,988	37.97	Golap Bidyanath Vyas	IND	4,487	24.38	2,501	13.59
Dhenkanal District
13	Athmallik	18.30	Dwitiya Roul	IND	6,054	69.45	Bhagaban Behera	INC	2,663	30.55	3,391	38.90
14	Angul Hindol	24.15	Hrusikesh Tripathy	INC	9,543	32.49	Radhamohan Pradhan	IND	8,104	27.59	1,439	4.90
14	Angul Hindol (SC)	24.15	Arkhit Naik	INC	Elected uncontested as only SC candidate							
15	Talcher	57.65	Pabitra Mohan Pradhan	INC	17,711	64.14	Pattayat Promoda Chandra Deb	GP	7,186	26.02	10,525	38.12
16	Pal-Lakhra-K Nagar	29.69	Mahesh Chandra Subahusingh	INC	17,251	51.41	Dukhabandhu Naik	SP	16,306	48.59	945	2.82
16	Pal-Lakhra-K Nagar (SC)	29.69	Baidhar Naik	INC	Elected uncontested as only SC candidate							
17	Dhenkanal (ST)	25.52	Madan Dehuri	CPI	11,564	23.60	Budhia Dehuri	SP	8,006	16.34	3,558	7.26
17	Dhenkanal	25.52	Baisnab Charan Patnaik	CPI	9,767	19.94	Braja Kishore Dhal	INC	9,578	19.55	189	0.39
Kalahandi District
18	Bhawanipatna (ST)	35.64	Janardhan Majhi	GP	37,867	39.30	Gajendra Bhoi	INC	11,587	12.03	26,280	27.28
18	Bhawanipatna	35.64	Jogesh Chandra Singh Deo	GP	36,669	38.06	Ganadhip Bhoi	INC	10,228	10.62	26,441	27.44
19	Jaipatna Kasipur (ST)	37.30	Jhajuru Jhodia	INC	11,206	57.87	Bisi Kandha	GP	8,157	42.13	3,049	15.75
20	Junagarh	50.78	Pratap Keshari Deo	GP	55,340	44.34	S. C. Behera	INC	5,707	4.57	49,633	39.77
20	Junagarh (ST)	50.78	Dayanidhi Naik	GP	54,389	43.58	G. Naik	INC	5,225	4.19	49,164	39.39
21	Nawapara	30.37	Anupa Singh Deo	INC	22,116	37.31	Ugramadhab Joshi	IND	6,474	10.92	15,642	26.39
21	Nawapara (ST)	30.37	Chaitan Majhi	INC	16,595	27.99	G. Bodhankar	IND	3,998	6.74	12,597	21.25
Bolangir District
22	Titilagarh (SC)	23.58	Ramesh Chandra Singh Bhoi	GP	19,573	34.33	Chandramani Naik	INC	7,393	12.97	12,180	21.36
22	Titilagarh	23.58	Muralidhar Panda	GP	19,084	33.47	Dibakar Bahidar	INC	7,453	13.07	11,631	20.40
23	Patnaghar	25.69	Arjun Das	GP	24,637	39.46	Dhoba Kondh	INC	4,161	6.66	20,476	32.79
23	Patnaghar (ST)	25.69	Ganesh Ram Bariha	GP	22,109	35.41	Narendra Parichha	INC	3,697	5.92	18,412	29.49
24	Bolangir	40.32	Nandakishore Mishra	GP	32,058	40.18	Kapileswar Prasad Nanda	INC	5,744	7.20	26,314	32.98
24	Bolangir (SC)	40.32	Achyutananda Mahananda	GP	30,494	38.22	Sundarmani Nag	INC	6,770	8.48	23,724	29.73
25	Sonepur	36.22	Antaram Nanda	GP	10,385	69.23	Yudhistar Mahapatra	INC	1,959	13.06	8,426	56.17
26	Binika	30.56	Baikuntha Nepak	GP	8,582	56.14	Shyamsundar Misra	INC	4,041	26.43	4,541	29.70
27	Birmaharajpur	43.40	Achutananda Mahakur	GP	15,915	78.27	Laxman Satpathy	INC	4,418	21.73	11,497	56.54
Sambalpur District
28	Padampur (ST)	25.96	Lal Ranjit Singh Bariha	INC	17,636	37.44	Lal Nityananda Singh Bariha	GP	3,696	7.22	13,940	27.25
28	Padampur	25.96	Anirudha Mishra	IND	7,979	15.60	Laxminarayan Misra	INC	7,126	13.93	853	1.67
29	Baragarh	26.35	Tirthabasi Pradhan	INC	4,391	33.04	Dinabandhu Kar	GP	2,801	21.08	1,590	11.96
30	Attabira	38.76	Bipin Bihari Das	INC	7,279	35.66	Brajamohan Panda	GP	5,427	26.59	1,852	9.07
31	Sohella	20.21	Bhikari Sahu	INC	9,945	21.67	Basant Kumar Sahu	SP	5,458	11.89	4,487	9.78
31	Sohella (SC)	20.21	Bisi Bibhar	INC	9,458	20.61	Baishnab Chandra Naik	GP	4,597	10.02	4,861	10.59
32	Ambabhona Mura	17.83	Makardhwaj Pradhan	SP	3,492	36.42	Madan Sahu	INC	3,042	31.73	450	4.69
33	Sambalpur Rairakhol (SC)	33.61	Bhikari Ghasi	GP	18,915	25.11	Ghanashyam Ganda	INC	13,406	17.80	5,509	7.31
33	Sambalpur Rairakhol	33.61	Shraddhakar Supakar	GP	18,717	24.85	Ratnakar Behera	INC	11,439	15.19	7,278	9.66
34	Jharsuguda Rampella	25.37	Bijoy Kumar Pani	INC	13,786	22.49	Tribikram Panda	GP	13,095	21.36	691	1.13
34	Jharsuguda Rampella (ST)	25.37	Manohar Singh Naik	GP	11,131	18.16	Mohan Singh	INC	9,635	15.72	1,496	2.44
35	Bamra	34.52	Haraprasad Deb	GP	21,631	30.59	Gangadhar Pradhan	INC	12,198	17.25	9,433	13.34
35	Bamra (ST)	34.52	Jayadev Thakur	GP	18,547	26.23	Baneswar Majhi	INC	8,818	12.47	9,729	13.76
Sundargarh District
36	Sundargarh	42.13	Krupanidhi Naik	INC	18,212	17.55	Harihar Patel	GP	16,364	15.77	1,848	1.78
36	Sundargarh (SC)	42.13	Dwarikanath Kusum	GP	16,330	15.73	Daitari Tanti	INC	15,828	15.25	502	0.48
37	Rajgangpur (ST)	59.35	Agapit Lakra	INC	17,912	60.61	Brajamohan Kisan	GP	9,099	30.79	8,813	29.82
38	Bisra (ST)	68.20	Madan Mohan Amat	INC	25,756	64.59	Nirmal Munda	IND	8,833	22.15	16,923	42.44
39	Bonai (ST)	33.39	Nilamani Singh Dandapat	GP	12,544	67.89	Balaram Mohapatra	INC	3,653	19.77	8,891	48.12
Keonjhar District
40	Champua (ST)	27.74	Gurucharan Naik	GP	13,493	79.05	Bairiganjan Naik	INC	3,576	20.95	9,917	58.10
41	Keonjhar	24.26	Laxmi Narayan Bhanja Deo	IND	29,489	55.87	Dasarathi Mohanty	SP	3,149	5.97	26,340	49.91
41	Keonjhar (ST)	24.26	Govind Chandra Munda	GP	12,849	24.34	Syamsundar Giri	INC	7,292	13.82	5,557	10.53
42	Anandapur	32.21	Janardan Bhanj Deo	IND	24,426	34.08	Maheswar Jena	INC	11,322	15.80	13,104	18.28
42	Anandapur (SC)	32.21	Bhaiga Sethi	IND	14,132	19.72	Guru Das	GP	8,079	11.27	6,053	8.44
Mayurbhanj District
43	Panchpir	29.35	Biswanath Sahu	GP	9,596	18.08	Sanatan Naik	IND	9,492	17.89	104	0.19
43	Panchpir (ST)	29.35	Ghasiram Sandil	IND	9,356	17.63	Bhaktabandhu Mahanta	SP	5,737	10.81	3,619	6.82
44	Kaptipada (ST)	19.67	Harachand Hansada	SP	6,621	72.78	Baidhar Majhi	INC	2,476	27.22	4,145	45.56
45	Khunta (ST)	30.71	Sakila Soren	SP	7,985	53.47	Dhyan Chandra Tudu	INC	6,949	46.53	1,036	6.94
46	Baripada	40.13	Girish Chandra Roy	SP	18,340	43.65	Ram Chandra Sahu	GP	9,094	21.64	9,246	22.00
46	Baripada (ST)	40.13	Surendra Singh	INC	Elected uncontested							
47	Bahalda (ST)	28.64	Sunaram Soren	INC	11,012	69.78	Kale Majhi	SP	2,557	16.20	8,455	53.58
48	Rairangpur (ST)	23.19	Haradeb Triya	INC	7,989	59.98	Mahendra Majhi	IND	3,567	26.78	4,422	33.20
49	Bangriposhi (ST)	19.09	Jadav Majhi	INC	7,147	57.75	Ishwar Chandra Nayak	SP	5,228	42.25	1,919	15.51
50	Muruda	39.13	Prasanna Kumar Dash	SP	7,480	33.66	Hasiram Mahanti	GP	4,972	22.38	2,508	11.29
Balasore District
51	Jaleswar	28.10	Karunakar Panigrahi	INC	8,541	57.62	Jogesh Chandra Jena	SP	4,718	31.83	3,823	25.79
52	Bhograi	34.40	Sashikanta Bhanj	IND	7,548	42.65	Durgasankar Das	INC	6,663	37.65	885	5.00
53	Basta	34.04	Trilochan Senapati	INC	11,974	78.71	Pranakrushna Das	GP	3,239	21.29	8,735	57.42
54	Soro	36.89	Nandakishore Das	INC	13,330	65.31	Sailen Mohapatra	CPI	4,898	24.00	8,432	41.31
55	Balasore	42.97	Surendra Nath Das	INC	20,763	73.42	Rabindra Mohan Das	SP	4,867	17.21	15,896	56.21
56	Nilgiri	38.25	Nilambar Das	INC	24,602	33.46	Banamali Das	CPI	5,717	7.78	18,885	25.69
56	Nilgiri (SC)	38.25	Chaitanya Prasad Sethi	INC	21,237	28.89	Pundari Dei	GP	4,798	6.53	16,439	22.36
57	Bhadrak	40.46	Mahamad Hanif	INC	17,059	73.23	Ganesh Prasad Roy	IND	4,962	21.30	12,097	51.93
58	Banth	44.86	Gokulananda Mohanty	INC	15,067	72.34	Raimohan Das	SP	3,858	18.52	11,209	53.82
59	Dhamnagar	46.78	Nilamani Routray	INC	14,603	63.25	Baishnab Chandra Naik	SP	6,143	26.61	8,460	36.65
60	Chandbali (SC)	45.65	Brundabana Das	INC	31,120	28.23	Ghansyam Das	SP	13,340	12.10	17,780	16.13
60	Chandbali	45.65	Chakradhar Behera	INC	28,568	25.91	Karunakar Das	SP	11,695	10.61	16,873	15.30
Cuttack District
61	Sukinda	42.73	Pitambar Bhupati Harichandan Mohapatra	IND	10,391	45.99	Madan Mohan Patnaik	INC	6,450	28.55	3,941	17.44
62	Jajpur (SC)	28.56	Santanu Kumar Das	INC	17,229	28.46	Manguli Jena	SP	3,686	6.09	13,543	22.37
62	Jajpur	28.56	Gadadhar Dutta	INC	17,010	28.09	Bipinbehari Mohanty	IND	6,346	10.48	10,664	17.61
63	Dharamsala	46.00	Paramanada Mohanty	SP	10,561	44.26	Motilal Pandit	INC	9,397	39.38	1,164	4.88
64	Binjharpur (SC)	29.05	Naba Kishore Mallick	INC	12,940	23.17	Birkishore Behera	IND	4,118	7.38	8,822	15.80
64	Binjharpur	29.05	Padmanava Roy	INC	12,128	21.72	Upendra Sambar Singh Mahapatra	IND	5,376	9.63	6,752	12.09
65	Barchana	44.28	Nabakrushna Chaudhury	INC	12,795	57.54	Jagannath Das	IND	5,089	22.89	7,706	34.66
66	Aul	61.04	Raja Sailendra Narayan Bhanja Deo	IND	23,208	70.12	Sahadeb Das	INC	7,907	23.89	15,301	46.23
67	Patamundai	39.60	Ram Raj Kumari	IND	9,073	37.39	Krupasindhu Parida	INC	8,820	36.35	253	1.04
68	Rajnagar	39.75	Saraswati Devi	INC	7,973	43.92	Ananta Charan Tripathy	IND	6,919	38.11	1,054	5.81
69	Kendrapara	49.06	Dinabandhu Sahoo	INC	12,865	41.68	Jadumani Mangaraj	PIP	11,895	38.53	970	3.14
70	Patkura	33.61	Lokanath Mishra	INC	13,883	60.58	Kashinath Das	IND	3,467	15.13	10,416	45.45
71	Tirtol	50.64	Nishamani Khuntia	SP	17,855	60.09	Maguni Chandra Kanungo	INC	9,554	32.15	8,301	27.94
72	Ersama	48.10	Gourishyam Naik	INC	12,040	45.61	Narendranath Jena	SP	7,396	28.02	4,644	17.59
73	Balikuda	44.39	Prana Krushna Parija	IND	8,326	38.25	Bhagirathi Mohapatra	INC	7,971	36.62	355	1.63
74	Jagatsinghpur	44.94	Nilamani Pradhan	INC	13,384	50.38	Priyanath Dey	SP	10,417	39.21	2,967	11.17
75	Kissennagar	47.05	Rajkrushna Bose	INC	13,883	48.57	Binod Kanungo	SP	11,468	40.12	2,415	8.45
76	Salepur	34.07	Surendranath Patnaik	INC	21,710	26.01	Surendra Dwibedi	SP	14,649	17.55	7,061	8.46
76	Salepur (SC)	34.07	Purnanda Samal	INC	13,923	16.68	Ananta Chandra Behera	SP	13,882	16.63	41	0.05
77	Mahanga	36.14	Mahammad Attahar	INC	4,122	23.96	Pradipta Kishore Das	SP	3,999	23.24	123	0.71
78	Cuttack Town	52.31	Biren Mitra	INC	13,440	53.81	Raghu Raut	IND	6,488	25.98	6,952	27.84
79	Cuttack Rural (SC)	35.71	Laxman Mallick	INC	20,718	24.55	Dhadi Bhanj	CPI	7,956	9.43	12,762	15.12
79	Cuttack Rural	35.71	Bhairab Chandra Mohanty	INC	18,563	21.99	Biswanath Pasayat	CPI	10,005	11.85	8,558	10.14
80	Banki	45.72	Gokulanand Praharaj	SP	11,210	47.38	Bhagban Ram	INC	5,592	23.64	5,618	23.75
81	Narasinghpur	40.80	Brundaban Sahu	GP	10,557	44.93	Bidyadhar Naik	INC	9,081	38.65	1,476	6.28
82	Athgarh	52.42	Radhanath Rath	INC	16,028	62.16	Biswanath Sahu	SP	7,213	27.97	8,815	34.19
Puri District
83	Kakatpur Nimapara	41.43	Upendra Mohanty	INC	32,325	30.48	Gatikrushna Swain	CPI	15,662	14.77	16,663	15.71
83	Kakatpur Nimapara (SC)	41.43	Gobinda Chandra Sethi	INC	30,492	28.76	Banchanidhi Setha	CPI	19,583	18.47	10,909	10.29
84	Satyabadi	40.43	Nilakantha Das	IND	8,412	44.72	Satyabadi Nanda	INC	5,897	31.35	2,515	13.37
85	Pipili	31.89	Jayakrushna Mohanty	INC	10,236	50.38	Raghunath Padhan	IND	3,464	17.05	6,772	33.33
86	Puri	40.26	Fakir Charan Das	SP	12,012	54.59	Lokanath Misra	IND	9,994	45.41	2,018	9.17
87	Bramhagiri	29.00	Biswanath Parida	IND	4,379	31.42	Jagannath Misra	INC	3,678	26.39	701	5.03
88	Banpur	53.47	Godabarish Mishra	IND	10,734	42.71	Nursingha Charan Samantsinghar	IND	9,511	37.84	1,223	4.87
89	Bhubaneswar	34.46	Satyapriya Mohanty	INC	25,478	32.52	Choudhary Gangadhar Das	IND	7,894	10.07	17,584	22.44
89	Bhubaneswar (SC)	34.46	Kanhu Mallik	INC	21,961	28.03	Biswanath Behera	IND	5,400	6.89	16,561	21.14
90	Khurda	29.96	Madhab Chandra Routray	INC	6,465	41.33	Prananath Patnaik	CPI	4,953	31.67	1,512	9.67
91	Begunia	29.90	Gangadhar Paikray	CPI	7,521	46.71	Krushna Chandra Misra	INC	6,801	42.24	720	4.47
92	Ranpur	40.84	Basanta Manjari Devi	INC	14,599	57.28	Gangadhar Misra	CPI	6,276	24.62	8,323	32.66
93	Nayagarh	30.68	Raja Saheb Krushna Chandra Singh Mandhata	IND	13,642	75.25	Sreedhar Das	INC	3,009	16.60	10,633	58.65
94	Khandapara	35.83	Raja Saheb Harihar Singh Mardraj Bhramabara Roy	IND	14,323	81.98	Antarjami Sahu	INC	3,149	18.02	11,174	63.95
95	Daspalla	42.98	Rajabahadur Kishore Chandra Deo Bhanj	INC	15,947	60.74	Brundaban Chandra Singh	IND	6,433	24.50	9,514	36.24
Ganjam District
96	Jaganathprasad	32.92	Biju Patnaik	INC	9,552	49.83	Ananda Chandra Rauto	CPI	4,272	22.29	5,280	27.55
97	Russelkonda	28.35	Dinabandhu Behera	INC	4,227	25.10	Gangadhar Allupati	IND	3,927	23.32	300	1.78
98	Aska	29.08	Harihar Das	CPI	12,258	18.64	Bhojram Swain	IND	5,596	8.51	6,662	10.13
98	Aska (SC)	29.08	Mohan Naik	CPI	8,720	13.26	Achuta Behera	IND	6,778	10.31	1,942	2.95
99	Khallikote	48.58	Ramachandra Mardaraj Dev	IND	19,862	83.07	Dandapani Pradhan	SP	2,811	11.76	17,051	71.31
100	Kudula	43.91	Banamali Maharana	SP	16,103	63.99	Jaganath Misra	INC	5,110	20.31	10,993	43.68
101	Purusottampur	36.89	Harihar Das	INC	5,714	30.11	Sadananda Mohanty	CPI	4,768	25.12	946	4.98
102	Chhatrapur	31.70	V. Sitaramaya	IND	5,124	25.76	Syamasundar Mishra	IND	4,330	21.77	794	3.99
103	Pattapur	45.19	Govind Pradhan	CPI	12,210	48.24	Brindabau Naik	INC	9,589	37.88	2,621	10.36
104	Berhampur (SC)	33.33	Dandapani Das	IND	12,184	17.77	Mohano Naik	INC	7,431	10.84	4,753	6.93
104	Berhampur	33.33	Ramachandra Mishra	IND	11,648	16.99	Gadi Narayan Murty	INC	10,713	15.63	935	1.36
105	Patrapur	33.93	Dibakar Patnaik	FBL(MG)	10,852	66.30	Lalmohan Patnaik	INC	3,427	20.94	7,425	45.37
106	Parlakhelmundi	18.07	Jaganath Mishra	CPI	9,621	20.78	Narayan Patro	INC	9,314	20.12	307	0.66
106	Parlakhelmundi (ST)	18.07	Apenna Dora Biswasrai	IND	3,653	7.89	Balaji Patamundala	IND	2,510	5.42	1,143	2.47
107	Udayagiri Mohana (ST)	10.15	Pattu Maliko	INC	2,851	58.10	Benupani Karji	IND	2,056	41.90	795	16.20

== Electoral analysis ==
=== Regional divergence: coastal plains vs. inland highlands ===
The 1952 election produced a sharp geographical cleavage between the coastal deltaic plains and the western and southern interior highlands. In the four coastal districts of Balasore, Cuttack, Puri, and Ganjam—which together accounted for 68 of the assembly's 140 seats—the Indian National Congress won 41 seats (60.29%), sweeping 11 of 12 seats in Balasore and 18 of 26 seats in Cuttack. Across all 68 coastal seats, the All India Ganatantra Parishad (AIGP) won only a single seat: the former princely enclave of Narasinghpur in western Cuttack district, captured by Brundaban Sahu. Opposition to the Congress in the coastal belt instead came from Independent candidates (15 seats), the Communist Party of India (5 seats, comprising 4 in Ganjam and 1 in Puri), the Socialist Party (5 seats), and the Forward Bloc (Marxist Group) (1 seat in Ganjam).

Regional distribution of seats won by political parties (1952)
Region	Districts	Total seats	INC	GP	SP	CPI	FBL(MG)	IND
Coastal Orissa	Balasore, Cuttack, Puri, Ganjam	68	41	1	5	5	1	15
North, Western, Central and Southern Orissa	Koraput, Phulbani, Dhenkanal, Kalahandi, Bolangir, Sambalpur, Sundargarh, Keonjhar, Mayurbhanj	72	26	30	5	2	0	9
Total		140	67	31	10	7	1	24

Conversely, in the nine interior and highland districts—encompassing the merged Gadajat princely states, Sambalpur district, and Koraput district (72 seats in total)—the Ganatantra Parishad won 30 seats to the Congress's 26. In Bolangir (incorporating the former Patna and Sonepur princely states), the Ganatantra Parishad achieved a clean sweep, winning all 9 seats by wide margins. In neighbouring Kalahandi district, where Pratap Keshari Deo won the Junagarh seat with 55,340 votes, the AIGP captured 4 of 7 seats, while in Koraput district it secured 7 of 11 seats. In Sambalpur district, where local campaigning centred on displacement from the Hirakud Dam reservoir, the AIGP swept both seats in the two-member Sambalpur–Rairakhol and Bamra constituencies and split the Jharsuguda–Rampella double-member constituency with the Congress, while the Congress held the Bargarh plain seats (Bargarh, Attabira, Sohella, and one seat in Padampur).

=== Performance in reserved SC and ST constituencies ===
Of the 49 reserved seats in the assembly (21 for Scheduled Castes in two-member constituencies; 16 for Scheduled Tribes in single-member constituencies and 12 in two-member constituencies), the Indian National Congress won 25 seats (13 SC and 12 ST), including four uncontested returns. The Ganatantra Parishad won 16 reserved seats (5 SC and 11 ST), polling strongly among Adivasi voters in Koraput, Kalahandi, Bolangir, Sundargarh, and Keonjhar. The Socialist Party won 2 ST seats in Mayurbhanj (Kaptipada and Khunta), the CPI won 2 reserved seats (1 ST in Dhenkanal and 1 SC in Aska), and Independents won 4 reserved seats (2 SC and 2 ST).

=== Independents, former rulers, and notable winners ===
The 24 successful Independent legislators (22.94% of the popular vote) fell into two primary categories:

- Nationalist leaders and public figures: In Puri district, veteran legislators and Satyabadi educators Nilakantha Das (Satyabadi) and Godabarish Mishra ( Banpur) defeated their Congress opponents as Independents. In Cuttack district, botanist and former Utkal University Vice-Chancellor Prana Krushna Parija won the Balikuda constituency as an Independent by 355 votes over the Congress nominee.
- Former rulers and local notables: Several former rulers and royal scions who did not join the Ganatantra Parishad contested and won their home territories as Independents, including Sailendra Narayan Bhanja Deo in Aul (70.12%), Krushna Chandra Singh Mandhata in Nayagarh (75.25%), Harihar Singh Mardaraj Bhramarabar Roy in Khandapara (81.98%), Ramachandra Mardaraj Deo in Khallikote (83.07%), Pitambar Bhupati Harichandan Mohapatra in Sukinda (45.99%), and Kumar Janardan Bhanj Deo and Laxmi Narayan Bhanja Deo in Keonjhar district. Conversely, two former dynastic figures won on Congress tickets: Kishore Chandra Deo Bhanj in Daspalla (60.74%) and Basanta Manjari Devi in Ranpur (57.28%).

Other notable winners included Biju Patnaik (INC, Jaganathprasad), Biren Mitra (INC, Cuttack Town), Nilamani Routray (INC, Dhamnagar), and Sadasiba Tripathy (INC, Nowrangpur).

=== Electoral extremes and women's representation ===
- Highest and lowest turnout: The lowest turnout in the election—which the Election Commission of India recorded as the lowest turnout in any state legislative assembly constituency across India in 1951–52—occurred in Udayagiri–Mohana (ST) in Ganjam district, where only 4,907 of the 48,337 registered electors (10.15%) cast ballots. Among single-member constituencies, the highest turnout was recorded in Bisra (ST) in Sundargarh district at 68.20% (39,877 votes out of 58,473 electors), followed by Aul in Cuttack district at 61.04% (33,099 votes out of 54,221 electors).
- Largest victory margins: In single-member constituencies, the largest margin of victory both in raw votes and percentage terms was recorded by Independent candidate Ramachandra Mardaraj Deo in Khallikote, who polled 19,862 votes (83.07%) to defeat Socialist candidate Dandapani Padhan (2,811 votes; 11.76%) by 17,051 votes (71.31% of valid votes). The second-largest percentage margin was achieved in Khandapara, where Independent candidate Harihar Singh Mardaraj Bhramarabar Roy polled 14,323 votes (81.98%) to defeat Congress candidate Antarjami Sahu (3,149 votes; 18.02%) by 11,174 votes (63.95%). In two-member constituencies, the largest vote tally and margin were recorded by Pratap Keshari Deo (AIGP) in Junagarh, who received 55,340 votes (44.34%) alongside running mate Dayanidhi Naik (54,389 votes; 43.58%) against 5,707 votes (4.57%) for their nearest Congress opponent—a margin of 49,633 votes (39.77%).
- Narrowest victory margins: The closest contest of the election took place for the reserved seat in the two-member Salepur constituency, where Congress candidate Purnananda Samal (13,923 votes; 16.68%) defeated Socialist candidate Ananta Charan Behera (13,882 votes; 16.63%) by 41 votes (0.05%). In the two-member Panchpir constituency, AIGP candidate Biswanath Sahu (9,596 votes; 18.08%) edged out Independent candidate Sanatan Naik (9,492 votes; 17.89%) by 104 votes (0.19%). Among single-member constituencies, the narrowest win occurred in Mahanga, where Congress candidate Mahammad Attahar (4,122 votes; 23.96%) defeated Socialist candidate Pradipta Kishore Das (3,999 votes; 23.24%) by 123 votes (0.71%).
- Women's representation: Three women were elected to the 140-member assembly (2.14% of the House): Basanta Manjari Devi (INC, Ranpur), Saraswati Devi (INC, Rajnagar), and Ram Raj Kumari (Independent, Patamundai).

== Government formation ==
=== Legislative arithmetic and coalition dynamics ===
The election resulted in a hung assembly, with the ruling Indian National Congress winning 67 seats—four short of the 71-seat threshold required for an absolute majority in the 140-member House.

Post-election legislative balance in the 1st Orissa Legislative Assembly (February 1952)
Political grouping	Seats won	Share of House (%)	Legislative alignment
Indian National Congress	67	47.86%	Ruling party
Independents	6	4.29%	Confidence and supply
Working government majority	73	52.14%	Government
All India Ganatantra Parishad	31	22.14%	Official Opposition
Socialist Party	10	7.14%	Opposition
Communist Party of India	7	5.00%	Opposition
Forward Bloc (Marxist Group)	1	0.71%	Opposition
Independents	14	10.00%	Opposition
Total	140	100.00%	—

Following the declaration of results, the All India Ganatantra Parishad explored forming a non-Congress coalition with the Left parties and independent legislators. However, ideological differences between the former princely rulers of the AIGP and the anti-feudal agrarian platform of the Socialists and Communists precluded a united opposition front. Governor Asaf Ali invited incumbent Chief Minister Nabakrushna Choudhuri—who had been unanimously re-elected leader of the Congress Legislature Party—to form a new administration after six independent MLAs pledged support to the Congress, giving it a working majority.

=== Executive appointment and inaugural session ===
The outgoing 2nd Orissa Provincial Assembly was dissolved on 20 February 1952, and the 1st Orissa Legislative Assembly was formally constituted via notification on the same day. On 20 February 1952, Governor Asaf Ali swore in the Second Nabakrushna Choudhuri ministry.

Source
Portfolio	Portrait	Name Constituency	Tenure		Party
Chief Minister; Relief & Rehabilitation; River Valley Development; Public Relations; Works; Other departments not allocated to any Minister.		Nabakrushna Choudhuri; MLA from Barchana	20 February 1952	19 October 1956	INC
Revenue; Excise; Supply		Nabakrushna Choudhuri; MLA from Barchana	20 February 1952	26 February 1952	INC
Finance		Nabakrushna Choudhuri; MLA from Barchana	20 February 1952	7 April 1952	INC
Home		Nabakrushna Choudhuri; MLA from Barchana	20 February 1952	1 January 1954	INC
Development		Nabakrushna Choudhuri; MLA from Barchana	1 January 1954	19 October 1956	INC
Revenue (excluding Commercial Taxes); Excise; Supply		Nabakrushna Choudhuri; MLA from Barchana	22 September 1956	19 October 1956	INC
Cabinet Minister
Law; Health		Dinabandhu Sahoo; MLA from Kendrapara	20 February 1952	26 April 1954	INC
Education		Dinabandhu Sahoo; MLA from Kendrapara	20 February 1952	7 April 1952	INC
Development		Dinabandhu Sahoo; MLA from Kendrapara	20 February 1952	1 January 1954	INC
Home		Dinabandhu Sahoo; MLA from Kendrapara	1 January 1954	26 April 1954	INC
Industries; Transport		Rajbahdur Kishore Chandra Deo Bhanj; MLA from Daspalla	20 February 1952	19 October 1956	INC
Tribal & Rural Welfare; Commerce; Labour		Sonaram Soren; MLA from Bahalda	20 February 1952	19 October 1956	INC
Excise; Supply		Sadashiva Tripathy; MLA from Nowrangpur	26 February 1952	22 September 1956	INC
Revenue		Sadashiva Tripathy; MLA from Nowrangpur	26 February 1952	29 January 1954	INC
Revenue (excluding Commercial Taxes)		Sadashiva Tripathy; MLA from Nowrangpur	29 January 1954	22 September 1956	INC
Finance; Education		Radhanath Rath; MLA from Athgarh	7 April 1952	19 October 1956	INC
Home; Law; Health		Satyapriya Mohanty; MLA from Bhubaneswar	26 April 1954	19 October 1956	INC
Deputy Minister
Health		Basanta Manjari Devi; MLA from Ranpur	20 February 1952	19 October 1956	INC
Works		Bhairab Chandra Mohanty; MLA from Cuttack Rural	20 February 1952	19 October 1956	INC
Home		Nilamani Routray; MLA from Dhamnagar	20 February 1952	19 October 1956	INC
Relief & Rehabilitation; Animal Husbandry; Public Relations		Anupa Singh Deo; MLA from Nawapara	20 February 1952	19 October 1956	INC
Local Self Government in Health; Fisheries; Co-operation		Santanu Kumar Das; MLA from Jajpur	20 February 1952	19 October 1956	INC
Transport; Forest		Tirthabasi Pradhan; MLA from Baragarh	6 March 1952	19 October 1956	INC
Supply; Agriculture		Krupanidhi Naik; MLA from Sundargarh	6 March 1952	19 October 1956	INC

The newly elected members of the First Assembly took their oaths of affirmation on 4 March 1952 in Bhubaneswar inside the building Bhubaneswar Town Hall (now known as Sardar Patel Hall), with Raja Sailendra Narayan Bhanja Deo acting as pro tem Speaker to administer the oath. Nandakishore Das was elected Speaker on 6 March 1952, and Mahammed Hanif was elected Deputy Speaker on 8 March 1952. Shraddhakar Supakar, leader of the 31-member Ganatantra Parishad legislature party, was formally recognized as the first Leader of the Opposition.

=== Constitutional litigation: Saradhakar Supakar v. Speaker ===
The inaugural schedule of the Assembly prompted a constitutional challenge before the Orissa High Court. Leader of the Opposition Shraddhakar Supakar filed a writ petition under Article 226 of the Constitution (Saradhakar Supakar v. Speaker, Orissa Legislative Assembly, AIR 1952 Ori 234), contending that Governor Asaf Ali's address to the House scheduled for 7 March 1952 violated Article 176(1)—which requires the Governor to address the Legislative Assembly "at the commencement of the first session after each general election"—because the members had already assembled on 4 March to take their oaths and on 6 March to elect the Speaker. On 7 March 1952, a division bench comprising Chief Justice B. Jagannadha Das and Justice Lingaraj Panigrahi dismissed the petition, holding that an Assembly is not legally constituted to transact legislative business until its members have taken the constitutional oath under Article 188 and elected a Speaker under Article 178, and that the Governor's address on 7 March therefore marked the lawful "commencement" of the first session.

=== 1956 leadership transition ===
Choudhuri's administration governed for four years and eight months, enacting major agrarian and administrative measures including the Orissa Anchal Sasan Act, 1955 and the Orissa Bhoodan Yagna Act, 1953. In January 1956, violent protests broke out in Cuttack, Puri, and Sambalpur after the States Reorganisation Commission (SRC) rejected Orissa's demand for the restoration of the Odia-speaking tracts of Seraikela and Kharsawan (which had been transferred to Bihar in 1948) as well as parts of Singhbhum district and Srikakulam district. Amidst political fallout from the agitation and internal party differences, Nabakrushna Choudhuri resigned as Chief Minister on 19 October 1956. Harekrushna Mahatab was appointed Chief Minister on the same day, leading the Second Harekrushna Mahatab ministry until the First Assembly was dissolved on 4 March 1957 due to second Assembly election.

== See also ==
- 1951–52 elections in India
- 1957 Orissa Legislative Assembly election
