= Second Harekrushna Mahatab ministry =

Government of Odisha (1956 – 1957)

- 7th Ministry of Orissa
- 1956 – 1957
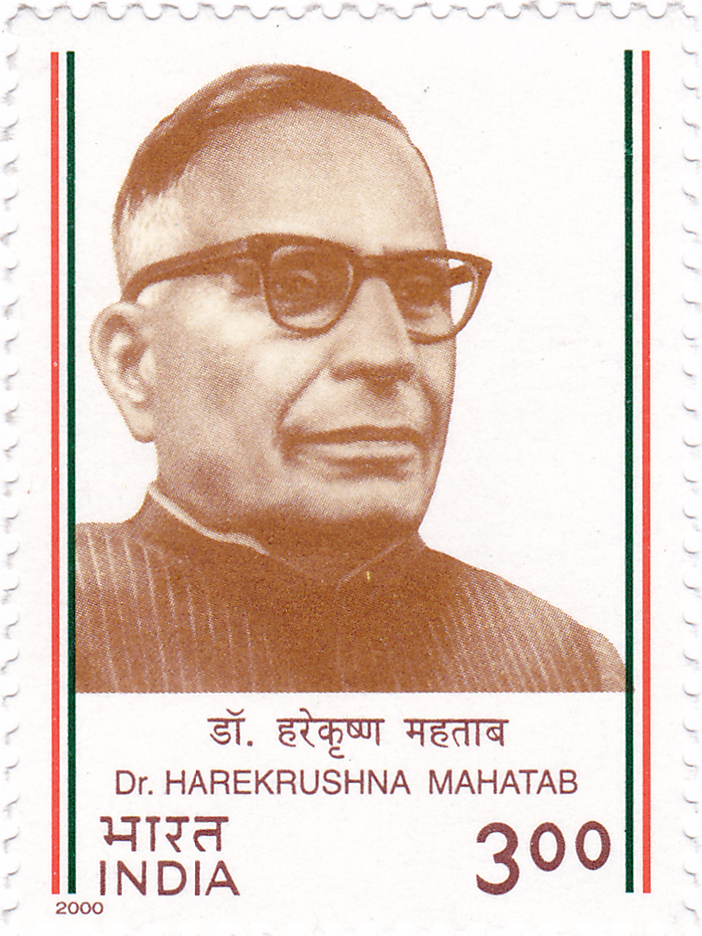
- Harekrushna Mahatab; Hon'ble Chief Minister of Orissa
- Date formed: 19 October 1956
- Date dissolved: 5 April 1957

People and organisations
- Governor: Bhim Sen Sachar
- Chief Minister: Harekrushna Mahatab
- No. of ministers: 8
- Member parties: Indian National Congress
- Status in legislature: Minority
- Opposition party: All India Ganatantra Parishad
- Opposition leader: Shraddhakar Supakar

History
- Incoming formation: 1st Orissa Legislative Assembly
- Election: 1952 Assembly election
- Legislature term: 168 days
- Predecessor: Second Nabakrushna Choudhuri ministry
- Successor: Third Harekrushna Mahatab ministry

Harekrushna Mahatab was sworn in as the chief minister of Orissa for the second time after resignation of Nabakrushna Choudhuri.

== Brief history ==
Shri Harekrushna Mahatab along with 3 Cabinet ministers and 5 Deputy Ministers were administered the oath of office by Governor Bhim Sen Sachar on 19 October 1956.

After Congress victory in 1957 Assembly election, Shri Mahtab resigned on 5 April 1957.

== Council of Ministers ==
Source
Portfolio	Portrait	Name Constituency	Tenure		Party
Chief Minister; Political and Services; Finance; Education; Health; Tribal & Rural Welfare; Labour; Other departments not allocated to any Minister.		Harekrushna Mahatab; Not Elected to the Assembly	19 October 1956	5 April 1957	INC
Cabinet Minister
Works; Transport; Agriculture; Co-operation; Forestry; Supply; Commerce; Relief & Rehabilitation		Radhanath Rath; MLA from Athgarh	19 October 1956	5 April 1957	INC
Revenue; Excise; Home; Law		Satyapriya Mohanty; MLA from Bhubaneswar	19 October 1956	5 April 1957	INC
Industries; Mines & Geology		Rajbahdur Kishore Chandra Deo Bhanj; MLA from Daspalla	19 October 1956	5 April 1957	INC
Deputy Minister
Health		Basanta Manjari Devi; MLA from Ranpur	19 October 1956	5 April 1957	INC
Home; Industries		Nilamani Routray; MLA from Dhamnagar	19 October 1956	5 April 1957	INC
Agriculture; Animal Husbandry; Marketing Organisation & Supply		Krupanidhi Naik; MLA from Sundargarh	19 October 1956	5 April 1957	INC
Tribal & Rural Welfare; Labour		Anupa Singh Deo; MLA from Nawapara	19 October 1956	5 April 1957	INC
Co-operation; Fisheries; Relief & Rehabilitation		Santanu Kumar Das; MLA from Jajpur	19 October 1956	5 April 1957	INC

== Demographics ==
Division	District	Ministers	Cabinet Ministers	Deputy Ministers
Central	Cuttack	2	Radhanath Rath	Santanu Kumar Das
Central	Puri	3	Rajbahdur Kishore Chandra Deo Bhanj; Satyapriya Mohanty	Basanta Manjari Devi
Central	Balasore	2	Harekrushna Mahatab (Chief Minister)	Nilamani Routray
Central	Mayurbhanj	0	–	–
Northern	Sambalpur	0	–	–
Northern	Sundergarh	1	–	Krupanidhi Naik
Northern	Keonjhar	0	–	–
Northern	Dhenkanal	0	–	–
Northern	Balangir	0	–	–
Southern	Ganjam	0	–	–
Southern	Kalahandi	1	–	Anupa Singh Deo
Southern	Koraput	0	–	–
Southern	Phulbani	0	–	–
