= Second Nabakrushna Choudhuri ministry =

Government of Odisha (1952 – 1956)

- 6th Ministry of Orissa
- 1952 – 1956
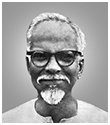
- Nabakrushna Choudhuri; Hon'ble Chief Minister of Orissa
- Date formed: 20 February 1952
- Date dissolved: 19 October 1956

People and organisations
- Governor: Asaf Ali
- Chief Minister: Nabakrushna Choudhuri
- No. of ministers: 14
- Member parties: Indian National Congress
- Status in legislature: Minority
- Opposition party: All India Ganatantra Parishad
- Opposition leader: Shraddhakar Supakar

History
- Incoming formation: 1st Orissa Legislative Assembly
- Outgoing formation: 2nd Provincial Assembly
- Election: 1952 Assembly election
- Legislature terms: 4 years, 242 days
- Predecessor: First Nabakrushna Choudhuri ministry
- Successor: Second Harekrushna Mahatab ministry

Nabakrushna Choudhuri was sworn in as the chief minister of Orissa for the second time following Congress emerging as single largest party in 1952 Assembly election.

== Brief history ==
In the first assembly election of state after independence, Congress led by Shri Nabakrushna Choudhuri emerged as single largest party with 67 seats. Shri Choudhuri along with 6 Cabinet ministers and 7 Deputy Ministers were administered the oath of office and secrecy by Governor Asaf Ali at the Raj Bhavan, Bhubaneswar on 20 February 1952.

With view on upcoming Assembly election, Shri Choudhuri resigned on 19 October 1956 paving way for Shri Harekrushna Mahatab to lead Congress into the election.

== Council of Ministers ==
Source
Portfolio	Portrait	Name Constituency	Tenure		Party
Chief Minister; Relief & Rehabilitation; River Valley Development; Public Relations; Works; Other departments not allocated to any Minister.		Nabakrushna Choudhuri; MLA from Barchana	20 February 1952	19 October 1956	INC
Revenue; Excise; Supply		Nabakrushna Choudhuri; MLA from Barchana	20 February 1952	26 February 1952	INC
Finance		Nabakrushna Choudhuri; MLA from Barchana	20 February 1952	7 April 1952	INC
Home		Nabakrushna Choudhuri; MLA from Barchana	20 February 1952	1 January 1954	INC
Development		Nabakrushna Choudhuri; MLA from Barchana	1 January 1954	19 October 1956	INC
Revenue (excluding Commercial Taxes); Excise; Supply		Nabakrushna Choudhuri; MLA from Barchana	22 September 1956	19 October 1956	INC
Cabinet Minister
Law; Health		Dinabandhu Sahoo; MLA from Kendrapara	20 February 1952	26 April 1954	INC
Education		Dinabandhu Sahoo; MLA from Kendrapara	20 February 1952	7 April 1952	INC
Development		Dinabandhu Sahoo; MLA from Kendrapara	20 February 1952	1 January 1954	INC
Home		Dinabandhu Sahoo; MLA from Kendrapara	1 January 1954	26 April 1954	INC
Industries; Transport		Rajbahdur Kishore Chandra Deo Bhanj; MLA from Daspalla	20 February 1952	19 October 1956	INC
Tribal & Rural Welfare; Commerce; Labour		Sonaram Soren; MLA from Bahalda	20 February 1952	19 October 1956	INC
Excise; Supply		Sadashiva Tripathy; MLA from Nowrangpur	26 February 1952	22 September 1956	INC
Revenue		Sadashiva Tripathy; MLA from Nowrangpur	26 February 1952	29 January 1954	INC
Revenue (excluding Commercial Taxes)		Sadashiva Tripathy; MLA from Nowrangpur	29 January 1954	22 September 1956	INC
Finance; Education		Radhanath Rath; MLA from Athgarh	7 April 1952	19 October 1956	INC
Home; Law; Health		Satyapriya Mohanty; MLA from Bhubaneswar	26 April 1954	19 October 1956	INC
Deputy Minister
Health		Basanta Manjari Devi; MLA from Ranpur	20 February 1952	19 October 1956	INC
Works		Bhairab Chandra Mohanty; MLA from Cuttack Rural	20 February 1952	19 October 1956	INC
Home		Nilamani Routray; MLA from Dhamnagar	20 February 1952	19 October 1956	INC
Relief & Rehabilitation; Animal Husbandry; Public Relations		Anupa Singh Deo; MLA from Nawapara	20 February 1952	19 October 1956	INC
Local Self Government in Health; Fisheries; Co-operation		Santanu Kumar Das; MLA from Jajpur	20 February 1952	19 October 1956	INC
Transport; Forest		Tirthabasi Pradhan; MLA from Baragarh	6 March 1952	19 October 1956	INC
Supply; Agriculture		Krupanidhi Naik; MLA from Sundargarh	6 March 1952	19 October 1956	INC

== Demographics ==
Division	District	Ministers	Cabinet Ministers	Deputy Ministers
Central	Cuttack	5	Nabakrushna Choudhuri (Chief Minister); Dinabandhu Sahoo; Radhanath Rath	Bhairab Chandra Mohanty; Santanu Kumar Das
Central	Puri	3	Rajbahdur Kishore Chandra Deo Bhanj; Satyapriya Mohanty	Basanta Manjari Devi
Central	Balasore	1	–	Nilamani Routray
Central	Mayurbhanj	1	Sonaram Soren	–
Northern	Sambalpur	1	–	Tirthabasi Pradhan
Northern	Sundergarh	1	–	Krupanidhi Naik
Northern	Keonjhar	0	–	–
Northern	Dhenkanal	0	–	–
Northern	Balangir	0	–	–
Southern	Ganjam	0	–	–
Southern	Kalahandi	1	–	Anupa Singh Deo
Southern	Koraput	1	Sadashiva Tripathy	–
Southern	Phulbani	0	–	–
