= Third Harekrushna Mahatab ministry =

Government of Odisha (1957 – 1961)

- 8th Ministry of Orissa
- 1957 – 1961
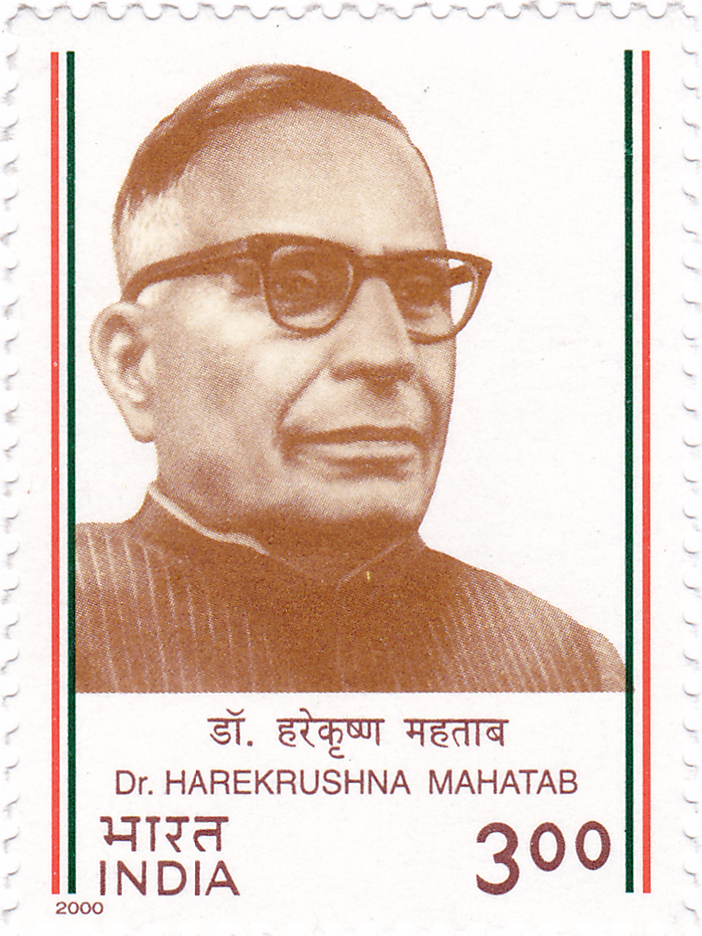
- Harekrushna Mahatab; Hon'ble Chief Minister of Orissa
- Date formed: 6 April 1957
- Date dissolved: 25 February 1961

People and organisations
- Governor: Bhim Sen Sachar
- Chief Minister: Harekrushna Mahatab
- No. of ministers: 15
- Member parties: Indian National Congress
- Status in legislature: Minority
- Opposition party: All India Ganatantra Parishad
- Opposition leader: Rajendra Narayan Singh Deo (till 22/05/1959)

History
- Incoming formation: 2nd Orissa Legislative Assembly
- Outgoing formation: 1st Orissa Legislative Assembly
- Election: 1957 Assembly election
- Legislature terms: 3 years, 272 days
- Predecessor: Second Harekrushna Mahatab ministry
- Successor: First Biju Patnaik ministry

Harekrushna Mahatab was sworn in as the chief minister of Orissa for the third time after 1957 Assembly election.

== Brief history ==
Congress party emerged as the single largest party by winning 40% of the seats. Shri Mahtab formed a minority government with the assured support from Jharkhand Party, Communist Party of India, and several Independent MLAs. He along with 2 Cabinet ministers and 5 Deputy Ministers were administered the oath of office by Governor Bhim Sen Sachar on 6 April 1957.

In May 1959, Cabinet was further expanded when Ganatantra Parishad from Opposition joined the ministry to form a Coalition govt for providing a stable administration to the state.

With rising disagreement on governance, Ganatantra Parishad left the ministry, following which Shri Mahtab resigned on 25 February 1961. For the first time in the state, President's rule was imposed & early elections were called.

== Council of Ministers ==
Source
Portfolio	Portrait	Name Constituency	Tenure		Party
Chief Minister; Political and Services; Other departments not allocated to any Minister.		Harekrushna Mahatab; MLA from Soro	6 April 1957	25 February 1961	INC
Agriculture; Co-operation; Forestry		Harekrushna Mahatab; MLA from Soro	6 April 1957	27 April 1957	INC
Finance		Harekrushna Mahatab; MLA from Soro	6 April 1957	22 May 1959	INC
Home; Education; Planning & Co- ordination		Harekrushna Mahatab; MLA from Soro	22 May 1959	25 February 1961	INC
Cabinet Minister
Home; Law; Education		Lingaraj Panigrahi; MLA from Berhampur	6 April 1957	22 May 1959	INC
Development		Radhanath Rath; MLA from Athgarh	6 April 1957	25 February 1961	INC
Revenue; Excise; Local Self Government in Health		Satyapriya Mohanty; MLA from Bhubaneswar	24 April 1957	22 May 1959	INC
Revenue; Excise; Administration of New Capital in Political & Services		Satyapriya Mohanty; MLA from Bhubaneswar	14 July 1959	25 February 1961	INC
Works		Sailendra Narayan Bhanja Deo; MLA from Aul	24 April 1957	22 May 1959	INC
Appointment, Irrigation, Embankment, Drainage & Electricity in Works		Sailendra Narayan Bhanja Deo; MLA from Aul	14 July 1959	25 February 1961	INC
Supply; Transport; Labour		Nilamani Routray; MLA from Chandabali	24 April 1957	22 May 1959	INC
Supply; Commerce		Nilamani Routray; MLA from Chandabali	14 July 1959	25 February 1961	INC
Industries; Mines & Geology		Dinabandhu Sahoo; MLA from Kendrapara	24 April 1957	22 May 1959	INC
Health (excluding Local Self Government); Relief & Rehabilitation		Basanta Manjari Devi; MLA from Ranpur	24 April 1957	22 May 1959	INC
Tribal & Rural Welfare; Commerce		Pabitra Mohan Pradhan; MLA from Talcher	24 April 1957	22 May 1959	INC
Administration of New Capital, Anti-Corruption, Administrative Tribunal & River Valley Development in Political and Services		Ramchandra Mardaraj Dev; MLA from Kodala East	24 August 1957	22 May 1959	INC
Matters relating to Rourkela Steel Plant including land acquisition, reclamation and resettlement in Political & Services		Ramchandra Mardaraj Dev; MLA from Kodala East	31 March 1958	22 May 1959	INC
Finance; Law; Industries; Mines & Geology		Rajendra Narayan Singh Deo; MLA from Titlagarh	22 May 1959	25 February 1961	AIGP
Transport; Roads & Buildings in Works		Brundaban Nayak; MLA from Hinjili	14 July 1959	25 February 1961	INC
Anti-Corruption, Administrative Tribunal, River Valley Development, Vigilance Organisation & Matters relating to Rourkela Steel Plant in Political and Services		Udit Pratap Sekhar Deo; MLA from Sundargarh	14 July 1959	25 February 1961	AIGP
Health		Ram Prasad Mishra; MLA from Loisingha	14 July 1959	25 February 1961	AIGP
Community Development, National Extension Services & Grama Panchayat Co-ordination in Planning & Co-ordination		Lakshmiprasad Misra; MLA from Sambalpur	14 July 1959	25 February 1961	AIGP
Tribal & Rural Welfare; Labour		Raj Ballabh Mishra; MLA from Champua	14 July 1959	25 February 1961	AIGP
Deputy Minister
Grama Panchyats in Political & Services		Santanu Kumar Das; MLA from Jajpur	6 April 1957	22 May 1959	INC
Fisheries & Co-operation in Agriculture, Co-operation and Forestry		Santanu Kumar Das; MLA from Jajpur	18 April 1957	22 May 1959	INC
Tribal & Rural Welfare (except Educational advancement of S.T. & S.C. and matters connected with Tribal Research Bureau)		Bir Bikramaditya Singh Bariha MLA from Padampur	5 May 1957	22 May 1959	INC
Transport		Kumud Chandra Singh; MLA from Angul	18 April 1957	22 May 1959	Independent
Public Relations in Home		Kumud Chandra Singh; MLA from Angul	8 June 1957	22 May 1959	Independent
Works		Kumud Chandra Singh; MLA from Angul	12 February 1958	22 May 1959	Independent
Local Development Works; Item No. 10 under the Planning in Political & Services; Community Development and National Extension Service of the Political and Services		Anupa Singh Deo; MLA from Nawapara	18 April 1957	22 May 1959	INC
Agriculture in Development (except control of officers serving in the Agriculture Dept)		Himansu Sekhar Padhi; MLA from Phulbani	9 September 1957	22 May 1959	AIGP

== Demographics ==
Division	District	Ministers	Cabinet Ministers	Deputy Ministers
Central	Cuttack	4	Radhanath Rath; Dinabandhu Sahoo; Sailendra Narayan Bhanja Deo	Santanu Kumar Das
Central	Puri	1	Satyapriya Mohanty	–
Central	Balasore	2	Harekrushna Mahatab (Chief Minister); Nilamani Routray	–
Central	Mayurbhanj	0	–	–
Northern	Sambalpur	2	Lakshmiprasad Misra	Bir Bikramaditya Singh Bariha
Northern	Sundergarh	3	Basanta Manjari Devi; Udit Pratap Sekhar Deo	Krupanidhi Naik
Northern	Keonjhar	1	Raj Ballabh Mishra	–
Northern	Dhenkanal	1	Pabitra Mohan Pradhan	–
Northern	Balangir	2	Rajendra Narayan Singh Deo; Ram Prasad Mishra	–
Southern	Ganjam	3	Lingaraj Panigrahi; Ramchandra Mardaraj Dev; Brundaban Nayak	–
Southern	Kalahandi	1	–	Anupa Singh Deo
Southern	Koraput	0	–	–
Southern	Phulbani	1	–	Himansu Sekhar Padhi
