= 1967 Orissa Legislative Assembly election =

Fourth Orissa Legislative Assembly held in 1967

- 21 February 1967

All 140 seats in the Orissa Legislative Assembly 71 seats needed for a majority
- Registered: 98,73,057 (▲15.45%)
- Turnout: 44.05% (▲7.48pp)
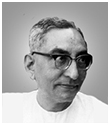
	Majority party	Minority party
		INC
Leader	Rajendra Narayan Singh Deo
Party	Swatantra Party	INC
Leader's seat	Balangir	-
Seats won	49	31
Seat change	▼33	▼6
popular vote	9,09,421	12,35,149
Percentage	34.78	30.66
Swing	▼8.5	▲1.92
Chief Minister before election
Sadashiva Tripathy
Indian National Congress
Elected Chief Minister
Rajendra Narayan Singh Deo
Swatantra Party

Elections to the Fourth Orissa Legislative Assembly were held on 21 February 1967.

== Constituencies ==
The elections were held for 140 constituencies, of which 22 were reserved for Scheduled Castes, 34 for Scheduled Tribes and 84 unreserved.

== Contesting parties ==
There were seven national parties:-

CPI, CPM, Congress, Praja Socialist Party, Samyukta Socialist Party, Swatantra Party, Bharatiya Jan Sangh,

One regional party Orissa Jana Congress (OJC) and some Independent Politicians took part in this assembly election.

== Results ==
Source: Election Commission of India
Party				Popular vote			Seats		
Color	Flag	Name	Symbol	Votes	%	±pp	Contested	Won	+/−
		Indian National Congress		1,235,149	30.66%	▼12.62	141	31	▼51
		Swatantra Party (Note: Prior to election, Ganatantra Parishad merged with Swatantra Party)		909,421	22.58%	▲0.24 (Note: As compared to Ganatantra Parishad's voteshare in 1961 election)	101	49	▲12 (Note: As compared to Ganatantra Parishad's seatshare in 1961 election)
		Orissa Jana Congress		542,734	13.47%	(new)	47	26	(new)
		Praja Socialist Party		493,750	12.26%	▲1.27	33	21	▲11
		Communist Party of India		211,999	5.26%	▼2.72	31	7	▲3
		Samyukta Socialist Party		61,426	1.52%	(new)	9	2	(new)
		Communist Party of India (Marxist)		46,597	1.16%	(new)	10	1	(new)
	-	Independents	-	505,394	12.55%	▼1.99	212	3	▼3
Total				-	-	-	-	140	-
Valid Votes				4,028,258	40.80				
Invalid Votes				320,580	-				
Total Votes polled / turnout				4,348,838	44.05				
Abstentation				5,524,219	-				
Total No. of Electors				9,873,057					

== Elected members ==
District	#	Constituency Name	Winner	Party
Mayurbhanj	1	Karanjia (ST)	Prafulla Kumar Das	Swatantra Party
Mayurbhanj	2	Jashipur (ST)	Durga Charan Nayak	Swatantra Party
Mayurbhanj	3	Rairangpur (ST)	Kartik Chandra Majhi	Swatantra Party
Mayurbhanj	4	Bahalda (ST)	Sonaram Soren	Orissa Jana Congress
Mayurbhanj	5	Bangriposi (ST)	Radhamohan Nayak	Swatantra Party
Mayurbhanj	6	Baripada	Santosh Kumar Sahu	Indian National Congress
Mayurbhanj	7	Muruda (ST)	Sakila Soren	Praja Socialist Party
Mayurbhanj	8	Baisinga (ST)	Prasanna Kumar Dash	Praja Socialist Party
Mayurbhanj	9	Khunta	Harachand Hansada	Praja Socialist Party
Mayurbhanj	10	Udala (ST)	Manmohan Tudu	Orissa Jana Congress
Balasore	11	Bhograi	Pyarimohan Das	Praja Socialist Party
Balasore	12	Jaleswar	Prasanna Kumar Paul	Praja Socialist Party
Balasore	13	Basta	Chintamani Jena	Indian National Congress
Balasore	14	Balasore	Rabindra Mohan Das	Praja Socialist Party
Balasore	15	Nilgiri	Banamali Das	Communist Party of India (Marxist)
Balasore	16	Sore	Haraprasad Mahapatra	Swatantra Party
Balasore	17	Simulia (SC)	Uchhab Charan Jena	Praja Socialist Party
Balasore	18	Bhadrak	Nityananda Mahapatra	Orissa Jana Congress
Balasore	19	Dhamnagar	Satyabhama Dei	Orissa Jana Congress
Balasore	20	Chandabali (SC)	Manmohan Das	Orissa Jana Congress
Balasore	21	Basudebpur	Harekrushna Mahatab	Orissa Jana Congress
Cuttack	22	Sukinda	Anandamanjari Debi	Orissa Jana Congress
Cuttack	23	Dharmasala	Paramananda Mohanty	Praja Socialist Party
Cuttack	24	Barchana	Jagannath Das	Praja Socialist Party
Cuttack	25	Binjharpur	Baishnab Charan Mallick	Praja Socialist Party
Cuttack	26	Jajpur (West)	Prafulla Chandra Ghadei	Orissa Jana Congress
Cuttack	27	Jajpur (East) (SC)	Santanu Kumar Das	Orissa Jana Congress
Cuttack	28	Aul	Dibakarnath Sharma	Indian National Congress
Cuttack	29	Patamundai (SC)	Biswanath Mallick	Praja Socialist Party
Cuttack	30	Rajanagar	Raja Sailendra Narayan Bhanja Deo	Independent
Cuttack	31	Kendrapara	Sarojakanta Kanungo	Praja Socialist Party
Cuttack	32	Patkura	Chakradhar Satpathy	Praja Socialist Party
Cuttack	33	Tirtol	Nishamani Khuntia	Praja Socialist Party
Cuttack	34	Ersama	Lokanath Choudhury	Communist Party of India
Cuttack	35	Balikuda	Baikunthanath Mohanty	Praja Socialist Party
Cuttack	36	Jagatsinghpur (SC)	Kanduri Charan Mallik	Praja Socialist Party
Cuttack	37	Gobindpur	Muralidhar Kanungo	Orissa Jana Congress
Cuttack	38	Salepur	Surendranath Patnaik	Orissa Jana Congress
Cuttack	39	Mahanga	Biraja Prasad Ray	Praja Socialist Party
Cuttack	40	Chaudwar	Akulananda Behera	Praja Socialist Party
Cuttack	41	Cuttack City	Biren Mitra	Indian National Congress
Cuttack	42	Cuttack Sadar (SC)	Sukadeva Jena	Orissa Jana Congress
Cuttack	43	Banki	Jogesh Chandra Rout	Independent
Cuttack	44	Athagarh	Pabitra Mohan Pradhan	Jana Congress
Cuttack	45	Baramba	Pratap Chandra Pattanaik	Orissa Jana Congress
Puri	46	Bhubaneswar	Harekrushna Mahatab	Orissa Jana Congress
Puri	47	Balipatna (SC)	Harihar Bhoi	Orissa Jana Congress
Puri	48	Pipili	Banamali Patnaik	Orissa Jana Congress
Puri	49	Nimapara (SC)	Nilamani Sethy	Orissa Jana Congress
Puri	50	Kakatapur	Gatikrushna Swain	Communist Party of India
Puri	51	Satyabadi	Gangadhar Mohapatra	Indian National Congress
Puri	52	Puri	Harihar Bahinipati	Praja Socialist Party
Puri	53	Bramhagiri	Brajamohan Mohanty	Indian National Congress
Puri	54	Banpur	Raghunath Mishra	Indian National Congress
Puri	55	Khurda	Raja Birkishore Dev	Orissa Jana Congress
Puri	56	Begunia	Gangadhar Paikaray	Communist Party of India
Puri	57	Khandapara	Raja Saheb Harihar Singh Mardaraj Bhramarabara Roy	Indian National Congress
Puri	58	Daspalla (SC)	Bhabagrahi Nayak	Swatantra Party
Puri	59	Nayagarh	Achyutananda Mohanty	Independent
Puri	60	Ranpur	Brajendra Chandra Bir. Baj. Narendra Mohapatra Singh Deo	Indian National Congress
Ganjam	61	Jaganathprasad (SC)	Udayanath Naik	Indian National Congress
Ganjam	62	Bhanjanagar	Dinabandhu Behera	Indian National Congress
Ganjam	63	Suruda	Ananta Narayan Singh Deo	Swatantra Party
Ganjam	64	Aska	Harihar Das	Communist Party of India
Ganjam	65	Kabisuryanagar	Dandapani Swain	Communist Party of India
Ganjam	66	Kodala	Banamali Maharana	Praja Socialist Party
Ganjam	67	Khallikote	Narayan Sahu	Samyukta Socialist Party
Ganjam	68	Chatrapur	Lakhmana Mahapatra	Communist Party of India
Ganjam	69	Hinjili	Brundaban Nayak	Indian National Congress
Ganjam	70	Dura (SC)	Mohan Nayak	Indian National Congress
Ganjam	71	Berhampur	Binayak Acharya	Indian National Congress
Ganjam	72	Chikati	Dibakar Patnaik	Indian National Congress
Ganjam	73	Mohana (ST)	Tareni Sardar	Indian National Congress
Ganjam	74	Ramagiri (ST)	Arjuna Singh	Indian National Congress
Ganjam	75	Paralakhemundi	N. Naikulu Kurma	Indian National Congress
Koraput	76	Gunupur (ST)	Bhagirathi Gomango	Indian National Congress
Koraput	77	Bissam Cuttack (ST)	Biswanath Choudhury	Swatantra Party
Koraput	78	Rayagada (ST)	Anantaram Majhi	Indian National Congress
Koraput	79	Narayanpatna (ST)	Bidika Mallana	Swatantra Party
Koraput	80	Nandapur (ST)	Malu Santha	Indian National Congress
Koraput	81	Malkangiri (ST)	Gangadhar Madhi	Indian National Congress
Koraput	82	Jeypore	N. Ramseshaiah	Swatantra Party
Koraput	83	Kotpad (ST)	Surjya Narayan Majhi	Indian National Congress
Koraput	84	Nowrangpur	Sadasiba Tripathy	Indian National Congress
Koraput	85	Kodinga (SC)	Jhitru Naik	Swatantra Party
Koraput	86	Dabugam (ST)	Dombaru Majhi	Swatantra Party
Koraput	87	Umarkote (ST)	Rabisingh Majhi	Indian National Congress
Kalahandi	88	Nawapara (ST)	Onkar Singh	Indian National Congress
Kalahandi	89	Khariar	Anupa Singh Deo	Indian National Congress
Kalahandi	90	Dharmagarh (SC)	Lochan Dhangada Majhi	Swatantra Party
Kalahandi	91	Koksara	Raghunath Praharaj	Swatantra Party
Kalahandi	92	Junagarh	Maheswar Naik	Swatantra Party
Kalahandi	93	Bhawanipatna (SC)	Dayanidhi Naik	Swatantra Party
Kalahandi	94	Narla (ST)	Anchal Majhi	Swatantra Party
Kalahandi	95	Kesinga	Bhagaban Bhoi	Swatantra Party
Phulbani	96	Udayagiri (ST)	Gopal Pradhan	Swatantra Party
Phulbani	97	Balliguda (ST)	Naresh Pradhan	Swatantra Party
Phulbani	98	Phulbani (ST)	Barada Prasanna Kanhar	Swatantra Party
Phulbani	99	Baudh	Himanshu Sekhar Padhi	Orissa Jana Congress
Balangir	100	Sonepur	Nilambar Raiguru	Swatantra Party
Balangir	101	Binka	Narasingh Charan Misra	Swatantra Party
Balangir	102	Tusra	Radhamohan Mishra	Swatantra Party
Balangir	103	Bolangir	Rajendra Narayan Singh Deo	Swatantra Party
Balangir	104	Loisinga	Nandakishore Misra	Swatantra Party
Balangir	105	Patnagarh	Ainthu Sahoo	Swatantra Party
Balangir	106	Saintala	Ramesh Chandra Singh Bhoi	Swatantra Party
Balangir	107	Titilagarh (SC)	Achyutananda Mahananda	Swatantra Party
Balangir	108	Kantabanji (SC)	Lokanath Rai	Swatantra Party
Sambalpur	109	Padampur	Bir Bikramaditya Singh Bariha	Orissa Jana Congress
Sambalpur	110	Melchhamunda	Birendra Kumar Sahoo	Swatantra Party
Sambalpur	111	Bijepur (SC)	Mohan Nag	Indian National Congress
Sambalpur	112	Bhatli	Saraswati Pradhan	Indian National Congress
Sambalpur	113	Bargarh	Bharat Chandra Hota	Indian National Congress
Sambalpur	114	Sambalpur	Banamali Babu	Indian National Congress
Sambalpur	115	Brajarajnagar	Prasanna Kumar Panda	Communist Party of India
Sambalpur	116	Jharsuguda	Murari Prasad Misra	Swatantra Party
Sambalpur	117	Laikera (ST)	Lal Rajendra Singh	Swatantra Party
Sambalpur	118	Kuchinda (ST)	Kanhai Singh	Swatantra Party
Sambalpur	119	Rairakhol (SC)	Bhikhari Suna	Swatantra Party
Sambalpur	120	Deogarh	Bhanuganga Tribhuban Deb	Swatantra Party
Sundargarh	121	Sundargarh	Harihar Patel	Swatantra Party
Sundargarh	122	Talsara (ST)	Gangadhar Pradhan	Swatantra Party
Sundargarh	123	Rajgangpur (ST)	Premchand Bhagat	Swatantra Party
Sundargarh	124	Bisra (ST)	Krushna Chandra Naik	Swatantra Party
Sundargarh	125	Rourkela	Rajkishore Samantarai	Praja Socialist Party
Sundargarh	126	Bonai (ST)	Hemendra Prasad Mahapatra	Swatantra Party
Keonjhar	127	Champua (ST)	Kshetra Mohan Nayak	Swatantra Party
Keonjhar	128	Patna (ST)	Ramaray Munda	Swatantra Party
Keonjhar	129	Keonjhar (ST)	Govinda Chandra Munda	Swatantra Party
Keonjhar	130	Telkoi (ST)	Bhagirathi Mohapatra	Swatantra Party
Keonjhar	131	Ramachandrapur	Raj Ballabh Mishra	Swatantra Party
Keonjhar	132	Anandpur (SC)	Bhubanananda Jena	Orissa Jana Congress
Dhenkanal	133	Pallahara	Pabitra Mohan Pradhan	Orissa Jana Congress
Dhenkanal	134	Kamakhyanagar	Brundaban Tripathy	Swatantra Party
Dhenkanal	135	Gondia	Haldhar Mishra	Swatantra Party
Dhenkanal	136	Dhenkanal	Ratnaprava Devi	Swatantra Party
Dhenkanal	137	Talcher (SC)	Kumar Chandra Behera	Orissa Jana Congress
Dhenkanal	138	Chhendipada (SC)	Nabaghan Nayak	Orissa Jana Congress
Dhenkanal	139	Angul	Kumud Chandra Singh	Orissa Jana Congress
Dhenkanal	140	Athamallik	Surendra Pradhan	Samyukta Socialist Party

== Govt. formation ==
Swatantra Party emerged as the winner by winning 49 seats It is first time in India that Indian National Congress lost the election in a close fight with Swatantra Party in the state. Rajendra Narayan Singh Deo become Chief Minister by forming a coalition government with OJC. He was the first non-Congress C.M. of Orissa. Rajendra Narayana Singh Deo was the Chief Minister of Orissa till 1971.
