= Padua Assembly constituency =

Former legislative assembly constituency in Odisha, India

Coordinates: 21.90°N 85.74°E

Padua
- Former constituency for the Odisha Legislative Assembly

Constituency details
- Country: India
- Region: East India
- State: Odisha
- District: Koraput
- Established: 1951
- Abolished: 1964
- Total electors: 67,470
- Reservation: None

Padua, also known as Padwa, was a constituency of the Odisha Legislative Assembly of the Koraput district, Odisha state in India. It was established in 1951 and abolished in 1964. It was replaced and subsumed by the constituencies of Nandapur, Jeypore and Kotpad.

== Historical Extent ==
- 1961: Padwa and Machkund police stations in Koraput sub-division; and Boipariguda police station in Nowrangpur sub-division.
- 1956: Padwa and Machkond police stations in Koraput sub-division; and Boipariguda police station in Nowrangpur sub-division.
- 1955: Padwa police station in Koraput sub-division; and Boipariguda police station in Nowrangpur sub-division.
- 1951: Kundra and Boipariguda police stations of Nowrangpur sub-division and Padua police station of Koraput sub-division.

== Elected members ==
Vote share of Winning candidates
1961	43.33%
1957	46.86%
1951	60.46%

3 elections were held between 1951 and 1964.

List of elected members:

Year	Member	Party
1952	Ganeswar Mohapatra	All India Ganatantra Parishad
1957	Laxman Gouda	All India Ganatantra Parishad
1961	Ganeswar Mohapatra	Indian National Congress

== Election results ==
=== 1961 ===
1961 Odisha Legislative Assembly election: Padwa
Party	Candidate	Votes	%	±%
INC	Mahapatra Ganeswar	3,434	43.33%	▲12.4
AIGP	Goudo Laxman	2,819	35.57%	▼11.2
Independent	Nayak Sadasibo	1,672	21.10%	New
Total valid votes		7,925		
Rejected ballots		544		
Turnout		8,469	12.55%	▼3.65
Registered electors		67,470		▲
Margin of victory		615	7.76%	▼8.25
INC gain from AIGP				

=== 1957 ===
1957 Odisha Legislative Assembly election: Padwa
Party	Candidate	Votes	%	±%
AIGP	Laxmana Goudo	4,486	46.86%	▼13.6
INC	Mohammad Kanna Saheb	2,953	30.84%	▼5.32
CPI	Bhagwan Khemundu Naiko	1,379	14.40%	New
Independent	Muddi Naik	412	4.30%	New
PSP	Rajendra Dondasensa	344	3.59%	New
Turnout		9,574	16.20%	▼11.3
Registered electors		59,088		▼
Margin of victory		1,533	16.01%	▼8.29
AIGP hold		Swing	▼13.6	

=== 1951 ===
1952 Odisha Legislative Assembly election: Padua
Party	Candidate	Votes	%	±%
AIGP	Ganeswar Mahapatra	9,982	60.46%	
INC	Kailash Ch. Nanda	5,970	36.16%	
Socialist Party (India)	Raghunath Mohanty	559	3.39%	
Turnout		16,511	27.57%	
Registered electors		59,886		
Margin of victory		4,012	24.30%	
AIGP win (new seat)				
