= Dibakar =

Dibakar is a given name. Notable people with the name include:

- Dibakar Banerjee (born 1969), Indian film director
- Dibakar Gharami, Indian politician
- Dibakar Patnaik (born 1899), Indian politician
