= Bamra Assembly constituency =

Former constituency of the Odisha Legislative Assembly, in India

Coordinates: 22.05°N 84.29°E

Bamra
- Former constituency for the Odisha Legislative Assembly

Constituency details
- Country: India
- Region: East India
- State: Odisha
- District: Sambalpur
- Lok Sabha constituency: Sundargarh
- Established: 1951
- Abolished: 1957
- Total electors: 1,02,420

Bamra, also referred to as Bamanda was a constituency of the Odisha Legislative Assembly, of the Sambalpur district, Odisha state in India. It was formed in 1951 and was abolished in 1957. It was replaced by the constituencies of Deogarh and Jarsuguda.

The Bamra constituency comprised the Deogarh and Kuchinda sub-divisions of Sambalpur district. Though Bamra was a part of Sambalpur district, this area (Deogarh and Kuchinda sub-divisions) used to come under the Sundargarh parliamentary constituency.

== Elected members ==
Vote share of Winning candidates
Year	Candidates
1951	(1)	30.59%
1951	(2)	26.23%

One election was held between 1951 and 1952. The constituency had 2 seats; following were members elected from it:

- 1951: (35): Haraprasad Deba, Jayadeba Thakur (Gana Parishad)

== Election results ==
=== 1951 ===
1952 Orissa Legislative Assembly election :Bamra
Party	Candidate	Votes	%	±%
AIGP	Hara Prasad Deb	21,631	30.59%	
AIGP	Joydeb Thakur	18,547	26.23%	
INC	Gadadhar Pradhan	12,198	17.25%	
INC	Baneswar Majhi	8,818	12.47%	
Independent	Ratnakar Patel	5,584	7.90%	
Independent	Dinabandhu Patra	3,925	5.55%	
Turnout		70,703	34.52%	
Registered electors		1,02,420		
AIGP win (new seat)				
