= Nandapur Assembly constituency =

Former legislative assembly constituency in Odisha, India

Coordinates: 21.90°N 85.74°E

Nandapur
- Former constituency for the Odisha Legislative Assembly

Constituency details
- Country: India
- Region: East India
- State: Odisha
- District: Koraput
- Established: 1951, Reestablished 1964
- Abolished: 1956–1964, Re-abolished 1973
- Total electors: 69,729
- Reservation: ST

Nandapur was a constituency of the Odisha Legislative Assembly of the Koraput district, Odisha state in India. It was established in 1951, abolished first in 1954, then reestablished in 1964, finally abolished in 1973. It was replaced and subsumed by the constituencies of Pottangi and Koraput. It was unreserved in 1951; then 1964 onwards it was reserved for the Scheduled Tribes.

== Historical Extent ==
- 1964: Semiliguda, Pottangi and Padwa police stations and Nandapur police station (excluding Petta and Bonomaliput grama panchayats) in Koraput sub-division.
- 1954–1964: [Abolished] [Subsumed by Pottangi and Koraput]
- 1951: Nandapur, Potangi and Similiguda police stations of Koraput sub-division.

== Elected members ==
Vote share of Winning candidates
1971	34.42%
1967	54.39%
1951	48.85%

3 elections was held in between 1951 and 1973. List of elected members:

Year	Member	Party
1952	Bhagaban Khemundu Naik	Indian National Congress
1957-1967 : Constituency did not exist
1967	Malu Santa	Indian National Congress
1971	Disari Sanu	Utkal Congress

== Election results ==
=== 1971 ===
1971 Odisha Legislative Assembly election: Nandapur (ST)
Party	Candidate	Votes	%	±%
Utkal Congress	Disari Sanu	3,898	34.42%	New
INC	Pangi Musari Santa	2,738	24.18%	▼30.2
SWA	Sanu Majhi	2,264	19.99%	New
INC(O)	Balaram Pangi	1,619	14.30%	New
Jana Congress	Malu Santa	805	7.11%	New
Total valid votes		11,324		
Rejected ballots		1,016		
Turnout		12,340	17.70%	▲3.13
Registered electors		69,729		▲
Margin of victory		1,160	10.24%	▲1.45
Utkal Congress gain from INC				

=== 1967 ===
1967 Odisha Legislative Assembly election: Nandapur (ST)
Party	Candidate	Votes	%	±%
INC	M. Santa	4,042	54.39%	▲5.54
SWA	B. Alayya	3,389	45.61%	New
Turnout		8742	14.57%	▼21.4
Registered electors		60,001		▲
Margin of victory		653	8.79%	▼8.29
INC hold		Swing	▲5.54	

=== 1951 ===
1952 Odisha Legislative Assembly election: Nandapur
Party	Candidate	Votes	%	±%
INC	Bhagaban Khemundu Naik	8,132	48.85%	
AIGP	Biswanath Uttarkabat	5,887	35.36%	
Independent	Nikantho Sahu	2,629	15.79%	
Turnout		16,648	36.05%	
Registered electors		46,183		
Margin of victory		2,245	13.49%	
INC win (new seat)				
