= Narayanpatna Assembly constituency =

Former constituency of the Odisha Legislative Assembly

Narayanpatna
- Former constituency for the Odisha Legislative Assembly

Constituency details
- Country: India
- Region: East India
- State: Odisha
- District: Koraput
- Lok Sabha constituency: Koraput
- Established: 1967
- Abolished: 1973
- Reservation: ST

Narayanpatna was an Assembly constituency from Koraput district of Odisha. It was established in 1967 and abolished in 1973. It was reserved for ST.

== Members of the Legislative Assembly ==
Between 1967 & 1973, 2 elections were held.

List of members elected from Narayanpatna constituency:

Year	Member	Party
1967	Bidika Mallana	Swatantra Party
1971	Jogi Tadingi	Indian National Congress (R)
