= Banpur Assembly constituency =

Former constituency of the Odisha Legislative Assembly

Banpur
- Former constituency for the Odisha Legislative Assembly

Constituency details
- Country: India
- Region: East India
- State: Odisha
- District: Puri
- Lok Sabha constituency: Puri
- Established: 1951
- Abolished: 1973
- Reservation: None

Banpur was an Assembly constituency from Puri district of Odisha. It was established in 1951 and disestablished in 1956. It was reestablished in 1961 and abolished in 1973.

== Members of the Legislative Assembly ==
Between 1952 & 1971, 4 elections were held.

List of members elected from Banpur constituency are:

Year	Member	Party
1952	Godabarish Mishra	Independent
1957-1960 : Constituency did not exist
1961	Raghunath Mishra	All India Ganatantra Parishad
1967	Raghunath Mishra	Indian National Congress
1971	Ramachandra Praharaja	Swatantra Party
