= Panchpir Assembly constituency =

Former constituency of the Odisha Legislative Assembly, in India

Coordinates: 21.763°N 85.973°E

Panchpir
- Former constituency for the Odisha Legislative Assembly

Constituency details
- Country: India
- Region: East India
- State: Odisha
- District: Mayurbhanj
- Lok Sabha constituency: Jajpur Keonjhar
- Established: 1951
- Abolished: 1957
- Total electors: 90,416

Panchpir, also referred to as Panchapidha was a constituency of the Odisha Legislative Assembly, of the Mayurbhanj district, Odisha state in India. It was established in 1951 and abolished in 1957. It was replaced by the constituencies of Udala, Karanjia and Jashipur.

The Panchpir constituency consisted of the Panchpir sub-division of Mayurbhanj district. Though this area (Panchpir sub-division) was a part of Mayurbhanj district, it came under the Jajpur-Keojhar Lok Sabha constituency.

== Elected members ==
Vote share of Winning candidates
Year	Candidates
1951	(1)	18.08%
1951	(2)	17.63%

One election was held between 1951 and 1952. The constituency had 2 seats. Members elected:

Year	Member	Party
1951	Kumari Ramraj (Note: representing Panchpir)	All India Ganatantra Parishad
1951	Ghasiram Sandil (Note: representing Panchpir (ST))	Independent

== Election results ==
=== 1951 ===
1952 Orissa Legislative Assembly election: Panchpir
Party	Candidate	Votes	%	±%
AIGP	Biswanath Sahu	7,985	18.08%	
Independent	Sanatan Naik	9,492	17.89%	
Independent	Ghasiram Sandil	9,356	17.63%	
Socialist Party (India)	Bhaktabandhu Mahanta	5,737	10.81%	
Socialist Party (India)	Rasananda Das	4,959	9.34%	
INC	Adhikari Charuchandra Das	4,547	8.57%	
INC	Pravakar Behera	4,127	7.78%	
Independent	Sirish Chandra Das	2,704	5.10%	
Independent	Surendranath Mahanta	2,553	4.81%	
Turnout		53,071	29.35%	
Registered electors		90,416		
AIGP win (new seat)				
Independent win (new seat)				
