= Ambabhona Mura Assembly constituency =

Former constituency of the Odisha Legislative Assembly

Ambabhona Mura
- Former constituency for the Odisha Legislative Assembly

Constituency details
- Country: India
- Region: East India
- State: Odisha
- District: Sambalpur
- Lok Sabha constituency: Sambalpur
- Established: 1951
- Abolished: 1956
- Reservation: None

Ambabhona Mura was an Assembly constituency from Sambalpur district of Odisha. It was established in 1951 and abolished in 1957. The constituency was subsumed into Bhatli.

== Extent of Assembly ==
- Ambabhona police station of Bargarh sub-division.
- Mahadevpali and Mura police stations of Sadar subdivision.

== Elected members ==
elections were held between 1951 and 1952.

List of members elected from Ambabhona Mura constituency are:

Year	Member	Party
1951	Makardhwaj Pradhan	Socialist Party
1957 onwards : See Bhatli
