= Kaptipada Assembly constituency =

Former constituency of the Odisha Legislative Assembly

Coordinates: 21.52°N 86.53°E

Kaptipada
- Former constituency for the Odisha Legislative Assembly

Constituency details
- Country: India
- Region: East India
- State: Odisha
- District: Mayurbhanj
- Lok Sabha constituency: Mayurbhanj
- Established: 1951
- Abolished: 1956
- Total electors: 46,244

Kaptipada was a constituency of the Odisha Legislative Assembly, of the Mayurbhanj district, Odisha state in India. It was established in 1951 and abolished in 1957. It was replaced and subsumed by the constituencies of Baisinga and Udala. It was reserved for the Scheduled Tribes.

The extent of Kaptipada constituency comprised Kaptipada sub-division excluding Khunta police station.

== Elected Member ==
Vote share of Winning candidate
1951	72.78%

One election was held between 1951 and 1952. Member elected:

Election	Portrait	Name	Party
1951		Harachand Hasada	Socialist Party

== Election results ==
=== 1951 ===
1952 Orissa Legislative Assembly election: Kaptipada
Party	Candidate	Votes	%	±%
Socialist	Harachand Hasada	6,621	72.78%	
INC	Baidhar Majhi	2,476	27.22%	
Turnout		9,097	19.67%	
Registered electors		46,244		
Margin of victory		4,145	45.56%	Steady
Socialist win (new seat)				
