= Gurucharan Naik =

Indian politician

Member of Parliament, Lok Sabha
- In office 1967–1971
- Preceded by: Laxmi Narayan Bhanja Deo
- Succeeded by: Kumar Majhi
- Constituency: Keonjhar, Odisha

Personal details
- Born: 24 January 1919 Mahadevnasa Village, Keonjhar District, Orissa British India
- Died: 14 February 1986 (aged 67)
- Party: Swatantra Party
- Other political affiliations: Ganatantra Parishad
- Spouse: Annapurna

Gurucharan Naik (1919–1986) was an Indian politician. He was elected to the Lok Sabha, lower house of the Parliament of India from Keonjhar in Odisha as a member of the Swatantra Party.
