= Purusottampur Assembly constituency =

Former constituency of the Odisha Legislative Assembly

Purusottampur
- Former constituency for the Odisha Legislative Assembly

Constituency details
- Country: India
- Region: East India
- State: Odisha
- District: Ganjam
- Lok Sabha constituency: Berhampur
- Established: 1951
- Abolished: 1956
- Reservation: None

Purusottampur was an Assembly constituency from Ganjam district of Odisha. It was established in 1951 and abolished in 1957. The constituency was subsumed into Kodala.

== Extent of Assembly ==
- Belgaon and Purusottampur firkas

== Elected members ==
Year	Member	Party
1951	Harihar Das	Indian National Congress
1957 onwards : See Kodala
