= Ghasiram Sandil =

Indian politician

Member of Parliament, Rajya Sabha
- In office 1959-1960
- Constituency: Odisha

Ghasiram Sandil was an Indian politician. He was a Member of Parliament, representing Odisha in the Rajya Sabha, the upper house of India's Parliament.
