= Laxmi Narayan Bhanja Deo =

Indian politician (1912–1986)

Member of Parliament, Lok Sabha
- In office 1957–1967
- Succeeded by: Gurucharan Naik
- Constituency: Keonjhar, Odisha

Personal details
- Born: 25 July 1912 Cuttack, Odisha British India
- Died: 9 July 1986 (aged 73)
- Party: Indian National Congress
- Spouse: A. Sau Premlatika Raje

Laxmi Narayan Bhanja Deo (25 July 1912 – 9 July 1986) was an Indian politician. He was elected to the Lok Sabha, lower house of the Parliament of India from Keonjhar in Odisha as a member of the Indian National Congress.

Deo died on 9 July 1986, at the age of 73.
