= Dibakar Patnaik =

Indian politician

Member of Parliament, Rajya Sabha
- In office 1958-1964
- Constituency: Odisha

Personal details
- Born: 6 October 1899
- Party: Praja Socialist Party

Dibakar Patnaik was an Indian politician. He was a Member of Parliament, representing Odisha in the Rajya Sabha the upper house of India's Parliament as a member of the Praja Socialist Party.
