= Orissa Jana Congress =

Former political party in India

- Abbreviation: OJC
- Leader: Harekrushna Mahatab
- Founded: 1966; 59 years ago
- Dissolved: 1977; 48 years ago
- Split from: Indian National Congress
- Merged into: Janata Party
- ECI Status: Former party

Orissa Jana Congress (Orissa Peoples Congress), generally just called the Jana Congress, was a political party in the Indian state of Orissa, from 1966 to 1977. The Jana Congress was formed in 1966 when Harekrushna Mahatab (former Orissa Chief Minister) left the Indian National Congress. After the 1967 elections the Jana Congress joined a coalition government in the state together with Swatantra Party. That government lasted from 1967 to 1969. In the 1971 and 1974 state elections the Jana Congress fared badly, and could only win a single seat. In 1977 the Jana Congress merged into the Janata Party.

== See also ==
- Indian National Congress breakaway parties
