= Gangadhar Paikaray =

Indian politician

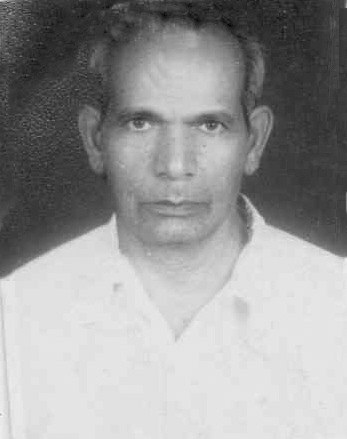

Gangadhar Paikaray (12 July 1915 – 31 August 1999) was a freedom fighter and leader of Communist Party of India. Gangadhar took part in the election and got elected as the first M.L.A. of Begunia-Bolagarh Constituency to the State Assembly with a large majority. Subsequently he was elected as M.L.A. from the aforesaid Constituency in the year 1961, 1967 and 1971. In Orissa State Assembly he acted as the leader of Communist legislators.
