= Bhubaneswar Assembly constituency =

Former constituency in Odisha legislative assembly

Bhubaneswar
- Former constituency for the Odisha Legislative Assembly

Constituency details
- Country: India
- Region: East India
- State: Odisha
- District: Khordha
- Lok Sabha constituency: Bhubaneswar
- Established: 1951
- Abolished: 2008
- Reservation: None

Bhubaneswar was an Assembly constituency from Khordha district of Odisha. It was established in 1951 and abolished in 2008. Following 2008 delimitation, It was subsumed by the Bhubaneswar Central Assembly constituency.

== Elected members ==
Between 1951 & 2008, 14 elections were held till date including 2 bypolls in 1967 & 1996. It was a 2-member constituency in 1951.

List of members elected from Bhubaneswar constituency are:

Year	Member	Party
1951 (Note: It was a 2 member constituency)	Kanhu Mallik	Indian National Congress
1951	Satyapriya Mohanty	Indian National Congress
1957	Satyapriya Mohanty	Indian National Congress
1961	Satyapriya Mohanty	Indian National Congress
1967	Harekrushna Mahatab	Orissa Jana Congress
1967 (bypoll) (Note: Resignation of Harekrushna Mahatab)	Subhadra Mahtab	Orissa Jana Congress
1971	Harekrushna Mahatab	Indian National Congress
1974	Harekrushna Mahatab	Utkal Congress
1977	Satyapriya Mohanty	Janata Party
1980	Rama Krushna Pati	Communist Party of India
1985	Biju Patnaik	Janata Dal
1990	Biju Patnaik	Janata Dal
1995	Biju Patnaik	Janata Dal
1996 (bypoll) (Note: Resignation of Biju Patnaik)	Biswabhusan Harichandan	Bharatiya Janata Party
2000	Biswabhusan Harichandan	Bharatiya Janata Party
2004	Biswabhusan Harichandan	Bharatiya Janata Party
2009 onwards: See Bhubaneswar Central

== Election results ==
=== 2004 ===
In 2004 election, Bharatiya Janata Party candidate Biswabhusan Harichandan defeated Indian National Congress candidate Sarat Kumar Kar by a margin of 85,897 votes.

2004 Odisha Vidhan Sabha Election, Bhubaneswar
Party	Candidate	Votes	%	±%
BJP	Biswabhusan Harichandan	123,671		
INC	Sarat Kumar Kar	37,774		
Margin of victory		85,897		
Turnout		1,78,624		
BJP hold				

=== 2000 ===
In 2000 election, Bharatiya Janata Party candidate Biswabhusan Harichandan defeated Indian National Congress candidate Jagannath Mohapatra by a margin of 94,555 votes.

2000 Odisha Vidhan Sabha Election, Bhubaneswar
Party	Candidate	Votes	%	±%
BJP	Biswabhusan Harichandan	117,150	78.96%	
INC	Jagannath Mohapatra	22,595	15.23%	
Margin of victory		94,555		
Turnout		1,48,372		
BJP hold				
