= Kishore Chandra Deo Bhanj =

Indian politician

Member of the Odisha Legislative Assembly
- In office 1951–1960
- Preceded by: Constituency established
- Succeeded by: Purna Chandra Bhanjadeo
- Constituency: Daspalla

Personal details
- Born: 16 April 1908 Daspalla State, British Raj
- Died: 16 January 1960 (aged 51) Odisha, India
- Party: Indian National Congress
- Relations: Daspalla royal family
- Education: Rajkumar College, Raipur

Kishore Chandra Deo Bhanj (16 April 1908 – 16 January 1960) was an Indian politician and the hereditary ruler (Raja) of the Daspalla State before its merger into the Indian Union. He served as a member of the Odisha Legislative Assembly for two consecutive terms, representing the Daspalla Assembly constituency.

== Early life ==
Kishore Chandra Deo Bhanj was born on 16 April 1908 in the Daspalla princely state (now in Nayagarh district). He was adopted by the ruling family and succeeded as the Raja of Daspalla in 1913. He was formally granted ruling powers in 1930 after completing his education at the Rajkumar College, Raipur.

== Political career ==
After the independence of India and the merger of the princely states, Deo Bhanj joined the Indian National Congress. He contested the first general elections of independent India in 1951. He was elected to the 1st Odisha Legislative Assembly from the Daspalla constituency. He was re-elected to the 2nd Odisha Legislative Assembly in 1957, again on an Indian National Congress ticket.

His election in 1957 was legally challenged in the case Raghunath Misra vs Kishore Chandra Deo Bhanj. The tribunal and subsequent appeals upheld his status as a candidate, providing significant legal documentation of his political career.

== Death ==
He died in office on 16 January 1960. Following his death, a by-election was held in the Daspalla constituency in 1960, which was won by Purna Chandra Bhanjadeo.
