= Shraddhakar Supakar =

Indian politician, social activist, and author

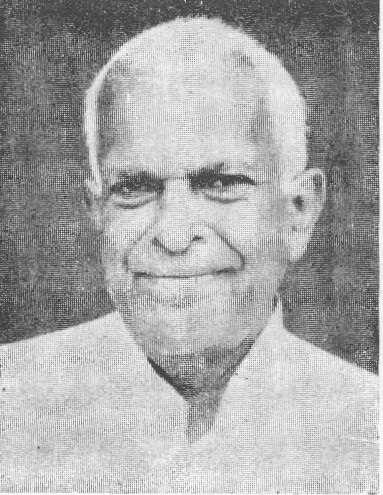
- Portrait of Sradhakar Supakar

Member: Odisha Legislative Assembly
- In office 9 March 1985 – 3 March 1990
- Preceded by: Ashwini Kumar Guru
- Succeeded by: Durga Shankar Pattanaik
- Constituency: Sambalpur
- In office 1952–1956
- Succeeded by: Bhanu Ganga Tribhubana Deba
- Constituency: Redhakhol

Member: 2nd and 4th Lok Sabha,
- In office 1967–1971
- Preceded by: Kishen Pattanayak
- Succeeded by: Banamali Babu
- Constituency: Sambalpur
- In office 1957–1962
- Preceded by: Natabar Pandey
- Succeeded by: Kishen Pattanayak
- Constituency: Sambalpur

Member: Rajya Sabha
- In office 27 Sept. 1965 – 26 Feb. 1967 (resigned)

Personal details
- Born: 14 September 1914 Jharuapada, Sambalpur, Odisha
- Died: 5 January 1993 (aged 78)
- Party: Indian National Congress
- Other political affiliations: Ganatantra Parishad
- Spouse: Tapaswini Devi

Shraddhakar Supakar (14 September 1914 – 5 January 1993) was a social activist, politician and writer. He was a member of Odisha Legislative Assembly, Lok Sabha and Rajya Sabha. Supakar was a lawyer by profession. He was associated in different capacities with many educational institutions and Universities. He was also a member of Odisha Text Book Committee during 1939–41. A firm believer in civil liberties, Supakar was Chairman of Reception Committee, All India Civil Liberties Conference, Cuttack Session held in 1954.

== Political Activity ==
Shraddhakar Supakar was an elected member of Odisha Legislative Assembly during 1952-56 and 1985-1990 representing Redhakhol and Sambalpur constituency. He served as Leader of Opposition during 1952-56 and as pro tem speaker in 1985. He was an elected member of the Second and Fourth Lok Sabha during 1957-62 and 1967-70 representing Sambalpur constituency of Odisha. He was also a member of Rajya Sabha during 1965–67.
