= Basanta Manjari Devi =

Indian politician

Member of Legislative Assembly and Minister for Industries and Social Welfare, Odisha
- Constituency: Ranpur

Personal details
- Born: 1900
- Died: 7 June 1961
- Political party: Indian National Congress
- Spouse: Biranchi Narayan Singh Deo

Basanta Manjari Devi (1900 – 7 June 1961) was an Indian politician who served as the first woman minister of Odisha. She was the Deputy Minister of Health in the 1946 Harekrushna Mahatab government.

== Early life and family ==
Devi was born into the royal family of Nilgiri State. Her father was Shyama Chandra Bhanja Mardaraj Harichandan. She was married to Biranchi Narayan Singh Deo of Ranapur State. In the 1946 general election she was elected from Ranpur constituency as an Indian National Congress candidate. She was a Minister of Health, Relief and Rehabilitation in the 1946 Harekrushna Mahtab ministry.

In Independent India she was Deputy Health Minister, Odisha in 1953.
