= All India Ganatantra Parishad =

- Abbreviation: AIGP
- Chairperson: Rajendra Narayan Singh Deo
- Founded: October 1950; 75 years ago
- Dissolved: 1962; 64 years ago
- Merged into: Swatantra Party
- Colours: Shade of Magenta
- ECI Status: Defunct Party

Election symbol

The Ganatanra Parishad (GP) or the All India Ganatantra Parishad (AIGP) was a regional political party based in Orissa state in eastern India from 1950 to 1962. This political party was formed by the former rulers of the erstwhile princely states and big landlords. It was founded in 1950 and Rajendra Narayan Singh Deo became its president. In 1962, after the parliamentary election, this political party was merged with the Orissa unit of the Swatantra Party.

== Background ==
The roots of this party can be traced to the Koshal Utkal Praja Parishad founded in October 1948 with its headquarters at Sambalpur. The first meeting of the Praja Parishad was held on 8, 9 and 10 October 1948 at Balibandha in Sambalpur. In the annual meeting of the Praja Parishad at Bolangir in October 1950 it was transformed into a full-fledged political party, the Ganatantra Parishad.

== Performance in the elections ==
In the first general election in 1951, the GP won 0.91% of the total votes and 6 seats in the Lok Sabha. In the first general election to the Legislative Assembly of Orissa in 1952, the GP received 20.5% of the total votes and 31 seats in the Legislative Assembly, and its leader, Shraddhakar Supakar became the leader of the opposition. In the second general election to the Legislative Assembly of Orissa in 1957, the GP received 28.74% of the total votes and 51 seats in the Legislative Assembly. Its leader, Rajendra Narayan Singh Deo became the leader of the opposition. After the fall of the minority Congress government, the GP formed a coalition government with the Congress on 22 May 1959. Rajendra Narayan Singh Deo became its finance minister. The coalition government collapsed on 21 February 1961 and the President's rule was imposed. In the third general election to the Legislative Assembly of Orissa in 1961, the GP received 22.34% of the total votes and 37 seats in the Legislative Assembly and Deo again became the leader of the opposition.
