= 3rd Orissa Legislative Assembly =

3rd state legislature of the Indian state of Orissa

←	2nd Assembly	4th Assembly	→
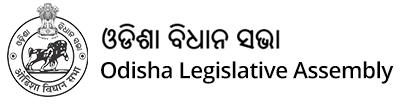

Overview
- Meeting place: Odisha Vidhan Saudha, Bhubaneshwar, Odisha, India
- Term: 21 June 1961 – 1 March 1967
- Election: 1961 Orissa Legislative Assembly election
- Government: Indian National Congress
- Opposition: All India Ganatantra Parishad
- Website: assembly.odisha.gov.in

Orissa Legislative Assembly
- House Composition
- Members: 140
- Governor: Y. N. Sukthankar; Ajudhia Nath Khosla; Justice Khaleel Ahmed acting
- Speaker: Lingaraj Panigrahi, INC
- Deputy Speaker: Lokanath Mishra, INC
- Leader of the House (Chief Minister): Biju Patnaik, INC; Biren Mitra, INC; Sadashiva Tripathy, INC
- Leader of Opposition: Rajendra Narayan Singh Deo, AIGP
- Party control: Indian National Congress (82/140)
- 10 Sessions with 335 sitting days

The Third Orissa Legislative Assembly was convened after the 1961 Orissa Legislative Assembly election.

== Brief History ==
In 1961 assembly election, Cong won an unprecedented 82 seats and Biju Patnaik became Chief Minister for the first time on 23 June 1961. Shri Patnaik resigned in 1963 Gandhi jayanti as per Kamaraj Plan. Shri Biren Mitra became CM but his reign was cut short amidst mounting corruption allegations. Nowrangpur MLA Shri Sadashiva Tripathy became the Chief Minister on 21 February 1965 and continued till the end of assembly term. Beginning of this session, The Assembly premise was shifted from Sardar Patel Hall to the assembly building where session take place currently.

== House Composition ==
Party	Strength
Indian National Congress	82
All India Ganatantra Parishad	37
Praja Socialist Party	10
Communist Party of India	4
Independent	7

== Office Bearers ==
Post	Portrait	Name	Tenure		Party
Governor		Yashwant Narayan Sukthankar	Assembly Begins	15 September 1962	N/A
Governor		Ajudhia Nath Khosla	16 September 1962	5 August 1966	N/A
Governor		Justice; Khaleel Ahmed (Acting)	5 August 1966	11 September 1966	N/A
Governor		Ajudhia Nath Khosla	12 September 1966	Assembly Dissolves	N/A
Speaker		Lingaraj Panigrahi; MLA from Kodala East	1 July 1961	18 March 1967	Indian National Congress
Deputy Speaker		Lokanath Mishra; MLA from Patkura	28 August 1961	1 March 1967	Indian National Congress
Leader of the House (Chief Minister)		Biju Patnaik; MLA from Choudwar	23 June 1961	2 October 1963	Indian National Congress
Leader of the House (Chief Minister)		Biren Mitra; MLA from Cuttack City	2 October 1963	21 February 1965	Indian National Congress
Leader of the House (Chief Minister)		Sadashiva Tripathy; MLA from Nowrangpur	21 February 1965	8 March 1967	Indian National Congress
Leader of Opposition		Rajendra Narayan Singh Deo; MLA from Kantabanji	21 June 1961	1 March 1967	Ganatantra Parishad

== Council of Ministers ==
=== First Biju Patnaik Ministry ===
Source
Portfolio	Portrait	Name Constituency	Tenure		Party
Chief Minister; Finance; Fisheries, Co-operation & Marketing Organisation in Development; Mines & Geology; Appointment, Irrigation, Embankment, Drainage and Electricity in Works; Planning in Planning & Coordination; Other departments not allocated to any Minister.		Biju Patnaik; MLA from Choudwar	23 June 1961	2 October 1963	INC
Cabinet Minister
Political and Services; Local Self Government in Health; Community Development & National Extension Service and Grama Panchayats, Co-ordination in Planning & Coordination		Biren Mitra; MLA from Cuttack City	23 June 1961	2 October 1963	INC
Revenue; Excise; Forestry in Development		Sadashiva Tripathy; MLA from Nowrangpur	23 June 1961	2 October 1963	INC
Education; Agriculture in Development; Tribal & Rural Welfare		Pabitra Mohan Pradhan; MLA from Pal-lahara	23 June 1961	2 October 1963	INC
Home; Commerce; Supply; Labour		Nilamani Routray; MLA from Basudebpur	23 June 1961	2 October 1963	INC
Health (excluding Local Self Government); Animal Husbandry in Development		P. Venkat Jagannath Rao; MLA from Dura	23 June 1961	2 October 1963	INC
Roads & Buildings in Works; Transport		Raja Saheb Harihar Singh Mardaraj Bhramarabara Roy; MLA from Khandapara	23 June 1961	2 October 1963	INC
Deputy Minister
Education		Saraswati Pradhan; MLA from Bhatli	23 June 1961	2 October 1963	INC
Irrigation & Power		Prahlad Mallik; MLA from Patamundai	23 June 1961	2 October 1963	INC
Fisheries; Co-operation		Santosh Kumar Sahu; MLA from Baripada	23 June 1961	2 October 1963	INC
Community Development, Panchayats		Brundaban Nayak; MLA from Hinjili	23 June 1961	2 October 1963	INC
Works; Transport; Agriculture		Bir Bikramaditya Singh Bariha; MLA from Padampur	23 June 1961	2 October 1963	INC
Labour		Chandra Mohan Singh; MLA from Rairangpur	23 June 1961	2 October 1963	INC
Tribal & Rural Welfare		Toyaka Sangana; MLA from Koraput	23 June 1961	2 October 1963	INC

=== Biren Mitra Ministry ===
Source
Portfolio	Portrait	Name Constituency	Tenure		Party
Chief Minister; Finance; Industries; Planning & Coordination; Mines & Geology; Irrigation & Power; Cultural Affairs; Local Self Government in Health; Other departments not allocated to any Minister.		Biren Mitra; MLA from Cuttack City	2 October 1963	21 February 1965	INC
Cabinet Minister
Political and Services; Home; Supply; Labour		Nilamani Routray; MLA from Basudebpur	2 October 1963	21 February 1965	INC
Revenue; Excise; Forest		Sadashiva Tripathy; MLA from Nowrangpur	2 October 1963	21 February 1965	INC
Education; Agriculture; Animal Husbandry; Co-operation		Satyapriya Mohanty; MLA from Bhubaneswar	2 October 1963	21 February 1965	INC
Health (excluding Local Self Government)		P. Venkat Jagannath Rao; MLA from Dura	2 October 1963	21 February 1965	INC
Works; Transport		Raja Saheb Harihar Singh Mardaraj Bhramarabara Roy; MLA from Khandapara	2 October 1963	21 February 1965	INC
Community Development & Panchayati Raj		Brundaban Nayak; MLA from Hinjili	2 October 1963	21 February 1965	INC
Tribal & Rural Welfare		Toyaka Sangana; MLA from Koraput	2 October 1963	21 February 1965	INC
Law		Banamali Babu; MLA from Attabira	2 October 1963	21 February 1965	INC
Minister of State
Irrigation & Power		Prahlad Mallik; MLA from Patamundai	2 October 1963	21 February 1965	INC
Transport; Animal Husbandry		Bir Bikramaditya Singh Bariha; MLA from Padampur	2 October 1963	21 February 1965	INC
Education		Saraswati Pradhan; MLA from Bhatli	2 October 1963	21 February 1965	INC
Jails in Home; Labour		Chandra Mohan Singh; MLA from Rairangpur	2 October 1963	21 February 1965	INC
Cultural Affairs; Local Self Government in Health; Co-operation		Santosh Kumar Sahu; MLA from Baripada	2 October 1963	21 February 1965	INC

=== Sadashiva Tripathy Ministry ===
Source
Portfolio	Portrait	Name Constituency	Tenure		Party
Chief Minister; Finance; Industries; Planning & Coordination; Mines & Geology; Irrigation & Power; Other departments not allocated to any Minister.		Sadashiva Tripathy; MLA from Nowrangpur	21 February 1965	8 March 1967	INC
Commerce; Revenue (excluding Registration of Deeds, Documents, Mahammedan Marriage and control of Offices in Registration Department); Forestry; Community Development & Panchayati Raj		Sadashiva Tripathy; MLA from Nowrangpur	21 February 1965	3 September 1966	INC
Matters relating to Shri Jagannath Temple, Puri, Hindu Religious Endowment in Law		Sadashiva Tripathy; MLA from Nowrangpur	3 September 1966	8 March 1967	INC
Cabinet Minister
Political and Services; Home; Supply; Labour & Employment; Housing		Nilamani Routray; MLA from Basudebpur	21 February 1965	25 February 1967	INC
Commerce; Forestry		Nilamani Routray; MLA from Basudebpur	3 September 1966	25 February 1967	INC
Education; Transport		Satyapriya Mohanty; MLA from Bhubaneswar	21 February 1965	8 March 1967	INC
Works		Satyapriya Mohanty; MLA from Bhubaneswar	21 February 1965	3 September 1966	INC
Works (excepting Public Health Engineering); Excise		Satyapriya Mohanty; MLA from Bhubaneswar	3 September 1966	8 March 1967	INC
Health (excluding Local Self Government)		P. Venkat Jagannath Rao; MLA from Dura	21 February 1965	8 March 1967	INC
Tribal & Rural Welfare		Toyaka Sangana; MLA from Koraput	21 February 1965	27 February 1967	INC
Registration of Deeds, Documents, Mahammedan Marriage and control of Offices in Registration Department in Revenue		Toyaka Sangana; MLA from Koraput	21 February 1965	3 September 1966	INC
Law; Local Self Government in Health		Banamali Babu; MLA from Attabira	21 February 1965	3 September 1966	INC
Law (excluding Matters relating to Shri Jagannath Temple, Puri, Hindu Religious Endowment); Local Self Government in Health		Banamali Babu; MLA from Attabira	3 September 1966	8 March 1967	INC
Agriculture; Co-operation		Ram Prasad Mishra; MLA from Loisingha	21 February 1965	25 February 1967	INC
Animal Husbandry		Ram Prasad Mishra; MLA from Loisingha	21 February 1965	3 September 1966	INC
Community Development & Panchayati Raj		Ram Prasad Mishra; MLA from Loisingha	3 September 1966	25 February 1967	INC
Minister of State
Irrigation & Power; Betterment levy of water rate & cess in Revenue		Prahlad Mallik; MLA from Patamundai	21 February 1965	8 March 1967	INC
Finance		Prahlad Mallik; MLA from Patamundai	3 September 1966	8 March 1967	INC
Education		Saraswati Pradhan; MLA from Bhatli	21 February 1965	8 March 1967	INC
Forestry; Mines & Geology		Santosh Kumar Sahu; MLA from Baripada	21 February 1965	8 March 1967	INC
Cultural Affairs		Santosh Kumar Sahu; MLA from Baripada	21 February 1965	3 September 1966	INC
Co-operation		Santosh Kumar Sahu; MLA from Baripada	3 September 1966	8 March 1967	INC
Labour & Employment; Housing; Excise		Chandra Mohan Singh; MLA from Rairangpur	21 February 1965	8 March 1967	INC
Registration in Revenue; Jails in Home		Chandra Mohan Singh; MLA from Rairangpur	21 February 1965	3 September 1966	INC
Revenue		Chandra Mohan Singh; MLA from Rairangpur	3 September 1966	8 March 1967	INC
Industries; Commerce; Transport		Chittaranjan Naik; MLA from Binjharpur	21 February 1965	26 February 1967	INC
Community Development & Panchayati Raj; Public Relations in Home		Anupa Singh Deo; MLA from Khariar	21 February 1965	8 March 1967	INC
Agriculture; Animal Husbandry		Madan Mohan Pradhan; MLA from Talcher	2 October 1963	26 February 1967	INC

== Members of Legislative Assembly ==
Source
District	#	Constituency	Name	Party	Remarks
Koraput	1	Omerkote	Sadasiba Tripathy	Indian National Congress	Chief Minister
Koraput	2	Dabugam	Jagannath Tripathy	Indian National Congress	
Koraput	3	Nowrangpur (SC)	Harijan Miru	Indian National Congress	
Koraput	4	Jeypore	Raghunath Patnaik	Indian National Congress	
Koraput	5	Kotpad (SC)	Mahadev Bakria	Indian National Congress	
Koraput	6	Malkangiri (ST)	Guru Nayak	Ganatantra Parishad	
Koraput	7	Padwa	Ganeswar Mohapatra	Indian National Congress	
Koraput	8	Koraput (ST)	Toyaka Sangana	Indian National Congress	
Koraput	9	Pottangi (ST)	Musuri Santa Pangi	Indian National Congress	
Koraput	10	Rayagada (ST)	Mandangi Kamaya	Indian National Congress	
Koraput	11	Gunupur	Narasinga Patra	Indian National Congress	
Koraput	12	Bissamcuttack (ST)	Biswanath Chowdhary	Ganatantra Parishad	
Ganjam	13	Parlakimedi	Nalla Kurma Naikulu	Indian National Congress	
Ganjam	14	R. Udaigiri (ST)	Ramachandra Bhoya	Indian National Congress	
Ganjam	15	Digapahandi	Raghunath Mahapatra	Indian National Congress	
Ganjam	16	Mohana (SC)	Biswanath Nayak	Indian National Congress	
Ganjam	17	Berhampur	Sisir Kumar Narendra Deb	Independent	
Ganjam	18	Patrapur (SC)	Trilochan Jani	Indian National Congress	
Ganjam	19	Dura	P. Venkat Jagannath Rao	Indian National Congress	
Ganjam	20	Chatrapur	Lakshman Mahapatra	Communist Party of India	
Ganjam	21	Khallikote	Ramchandra Mardaraj Dev	Indian National Congress	Died in 1963.
Ganjam	21	Khallikote	V. Sugnana Kumari Deo	Indian National Congress	Elected in 1963 bypoll.
Ganjam	22	Hinjili	Brundaban Nayak	Indian National Congress	
Ganjam	23	Kodala West	Bishwanath Das	Indian National Congress	Resigned as appointed Governor of Uttar Pradesh.
Ganjam	23	Kodala West	Banamali Maharana	Praja Socialist Party	Elected in 1962 bypoll.
Ganjam	24	Kodala East	Lingaraj Panigrahi	Indian National Congress	Speaker
Ganjam	25	Bhanjanagar	Maguni Charan Pradhan	Indian National Congress	
Ganjam	26	Jagannath Prasad (SC)	Udayanath Naik	Indian National Congress	
Ganjam	27	Aska	Lokanath Mishra	Indian National Congress	
Ganjam	28	Suruda	Arjun Naik	Indian National Congress	
Phulbani	29	Balliguda (ST)	Podra Dubara	Ganatantra Parishad	
Phulbani	30	G. Udayagiri (ST)	Sarangdhar Pradhan	Indian National Congress	
Phulbani	31	Phulbani	Himansu Sekhar Padhi	Indian National Congress	
Phulbani	32	Baudh (SC)	Anirudha Dipa	Ganatantra Parishad	
Kalahandi	33	Madanpur-Rampur	Birakeshari Deo	Ganatantra Parishad	
Kalahandi	34	Bhawanipatna (ST)	Anchal Majhi	Ganatantra Parishad	
Kalahandi	35	Kasipur	Nabakumari Devi	Ganatantra Parishad	
Kalahandi	36	Koksara (SC)	Dayanidhi Naik	Ganatantra Parishad	
Kalahandi	37	Junagarh	Maheswar Naik	Ganatantra Parishad	
Kalahandi	38	Dharamgarh (ST)	Mukunda Naik	Ganatantra Parishad	
Kalahandi	39	Khariar	Anupa Singh Deo	Indian National Congress	
Kalahandi	40	Nawpara (ST)	Ghasiram Majhi	Independent	
Bolangir	41	Kantabanji	Rajendra Narayan Singh Deo	Ganatantra Parishad	Leader of Opposition
Bolangir	42	Titilagarh (SC)	Achyutananda Mahananda	Ganatantra Parishad	
Bolangir	43	Saintala	Ainthu Sahoo	Ganatantra Parishad	
Bolangir	44	Patnagarh (ST)	Ramesh Chandra Singh Bhoi	Ganatantra Parishad	
Bolangir	45	Loisingha	Ram Prasad Mishra	Ganatantra Parishad	
Bolangir	46	Bolangir (ST)	Chandra Sekhar Singh Bhoi	Ganatantra Parishad	
Bolangir	47	Tusra	Nandakishore Mishra	Ganatantra Parishad	
Bolangir	48	Binka	Anantaram Nanda	Ganatantra Parishad	
Bolangir	49	Sonepur (SC)	Daulata Ganda	Ganatantra Parishad	
Sambalpur	50	Melchhamunda	Satchidananda Padhi	Indian National Congress	
Sambalpur	51	Padampur (ST)	Bir Bikramaditya Singh Bariha	Indian National Congress	
Sambalpur	52	Bargarh	Gananath Pradhan	Independent	
Sambalpur	53	Bijepur (SC)	Mohan Nag	Indian National Congress	
Sambalpur	54	Bhatli	Saraswati Pradhan	Indian National Congress	
Sambalpur	55	Sambalpur	Banamali Babu	Indian National Congress	
Sambalpur	56	Attabira (SC)	Dalaganjan Chhuria	Indian National Congress	
Sambalpur	57	Katarbaga	Bishnu Prasad Mishra	Ganatantra Parishad	
Sambalpur	58	Deogarh (ST)	Jayadev Thakur	Ganatantra Parishad	
Sambalpur	59	Rairakhol	Bhanuganga Tribhuban Deb	Ganatantra Parishad	
Sambalpur	60	Brajrajnagar	Prasanna Kumar Panda	Communist Party of India	
Sambalpur	61	Jharsuguda (ST)	Binod Behari Singh Bariha	Indian National Congress	Resigned.
Sambalpur	61	Jharsuguda (ST)	Binod Behari Singh Bariha	Indian National Congress	Elected on 1963 bypoll.
Sundergarh	62	Sundergarh	Harihar Patel	Ganatantra Parishad	
Sundergarh	63	Talsara (ST)	Gangadhar Pradhan	Ganatantra Parishad	
Sundergarh	64	Rajgangpur (ST)	Rangaballabh Amat	Indian National Congress	
Sundergarh	65	Bisra (ST)	Premchand Bhagat	Ganatantra Parishad	
Sundergarh	66	Bonai (ST)	Hemendra Prasad Mahapatra	Ganatantra Parishad	
Keonjhar	67	Champua (ST)	Guru Charan Naik	Ganatantra Parishad	
Keonjhar	68	Patna	Raj Ballabh Mishra	Ganatantra Parishad	
Keonjhar	69	Keonjhar	Janardan Bhanj Deo	Ganatantra Parishad	Died in 1965.
Keonjhar	69	Keonjhar	Karunakar Pradhan	Swatantra Party	Elected in 1965 bypoll.
Keonjhar	70	Telkoi (ST)	Govinda Chandra Munda	Ganatantra Parishad	
Keonjhar	71	Ramachandrapur	Muralidhar Kuanr	Indian National Congress	
Keonjhar	72	Anandapur (SC)	Makar Sethi	Indian National Congress	
Dhenkanal	73	Pal-lahara	Pabitra Mohan Pradhan	Indian National Congress	
Dhenkanal	74	Talcher	Pabitra Mohan Pradhan	Indian National Congress	Resigned as elected in two seats.
Dhenkanal	74	Talcher	Madan Mohan Pradhan	Indian National Congress	Elected in 1961 bypoll.
Dhenkanal	75	Kamakhyanagar	Brundaban Tripathy	Ganatantra Parishad	
Dhenkanal	76	Dhenkanal	Ratnaprava Devi	Ganatantra Parishad	
Dhenkanal	77	Gondia	Kalia Dehuri	Ganatantra Parishad	
Dhenkanal	78	Chhendipada (SC)	Pada Naik	Indian National Congress	
Dhenkanal	79	Angul	Kumud Chandra Singh	Indian National Congress	
Dhenkanal	80	Athmallik	Khetra Mohan Panigrahi	Ganatantra Parishad	
Puri	81	Banpur	Raghunath Mishra	Ganatantra Parishad	
Puri	82	Daspalla (SC)	Saheb Naik	Indian National Congress	
Puri	83	Khandpara	Raja Saheb Harihar Singh Mardaraj Bhramarabara Roy	Indian National Congress	
Puri	84	Nayagarh	Brundaban Chandra Singh	Indian National Congress	
Puri	85	Ranpur	Ram Chandra Ram	Communist Party of India	
Puri	86	Begunia	Gangadhar Paikray	Communist Party of India	
Puri	87	Khurda	Banamali Patnaik	Indian National Congress	
Puri	88	Bhubaneswar	Satyapriya Mohanty	Indian National Congress	
Puri	89	Balipatna (SC)	Gopinath Bhoi	Indian National Congress	
Puri	90	Brahmagiri	Gopabandhu Patra	Independent	
Puri	91	Puri	Bhagban Pratihari	Indian National Congress	
Puri	92	Satyabadi	Rajraj Deb	Ganatantra Parishad	
Puri	93	Pipili	Ram Chandra Patnaik	Indian National Congress	
Puri	94	Kakatpur	Upendra Mohanty	Indian National Congress	
Puri	95	Nimapara (SC)	Gobinda Chandra Sethi	Indian National Congress	
Cuttack	96	Banki	Gokulanand Praharaj	Praja Socialist Party	
Cuttack	97	Baramba	Bidyadhar Naik	Indian National Congress	
Cuttack	98	Athgarh	Achyutananda Dash	Independent	
Cuttack	99	Cuttack City	Biren Mitra	Indian National Congress	Chief Minister
Cuttack	100	Choudwar	Biju Pattnaik	Indian National Congress	Chief Minister
Cuttack	101	Cuttack Sadar (SC)	Laxman Mallick	Indian National Congress	
Cuttack	102	Jagatsinghpur	Priyanath Dey	Indian National Congress	
Cuttack	103	Govindpur (SC)	Kanduri Charan Mallik	Praja Socialist Party	
Cuttack	104	Mahanga	Surendranath Patnaik	Indian National Congress	
Cuttack	105	Salepur (SC)	Baidhar Behera	Praja Socialist Party	
Cuttack	106	Balikuda	Bipin Bihari Das	Indian National Congress	
Cuttack	107	Ersama	Ratnamali Jema	Indian National Congress	
Cuttack	108	Tirtol	Pratap Chandra Mohanty	Indian National Congress	
Cuttack	109	Patkura	Lokanath Mishra	Indian National Congress	Deputy Speaker
Cuttack	110	Rajnagar	Padma Charan Naik	Independent	
Cuttack	111	Aul	Raja Sailendra Narayan Bhanja Deo	Indian National Congress	
Cuttack	112	Kendrapara	Dhruba Charan Sahu	Praja Socialist Party	
Cuttack	113	Pattamundei (SC)	Prahlad Mallik	Indian National Congress	
Cuttack	114	Binjharpur	Chittaranjan Naik	Indian National Congress	
Cuttack	115	Berchana	Dhananjoy Lenka	Indian National Congress	
Cuttack	116	Dharmasala	Gadadhar Dutta	Indian National Congress	
Cuttack	117	Sukinda (SC)	Baidhar Singh	Indian National Congress	
Cuttack	118	Jajpur West	Madan Mohan Patnaik	Indian National Congress	Died in 1963.
Cuttack	118	Jajpur West	Narayan Chandra Pati	Indian National Congress	Elected in 1963 bypoll.
Cuttack	119	Jajpur East (SC)	Santanu Kumar Das	Indian National Congress	
Balasore	120	Dhamnagar	Muralidhar Jena	Indian National Congress	
Balasore	121	Basudebpur	Nilamani Routray	Indian National Congress	
Balasore	122	Chandbali (SC)	Bairagi Jena	Indian National Congress	
Balasore	123	Bhadrak	Nityananda Mahapatra	Independent	
Balasore	124	Soro	Karunakar Panigrahi	Indian National Congress	
Balasore	125	Simulia (SC)	Bhagiratha Das	Indian National Congress	
Balasore	126	Nilgiri	Rajendra Chandra Mardaraj Harichandan	Ganatantra Parishad	
Balasore	127	Balasore	Bijoy Krushna De	Indian National Congress	
Balasore	128	Basta	Maheswar Baug	Praja Socialist Party	
Balasore	129	Bhograi	Pyarimohan Das	Praja Socialist Party	
Balasore	130	Jaleswar	Prasanna Kumar Paul	Praja Socialist Party	
Mayurbhanj	131	Kunta	Prasanna Kumar Dash	Praja Socialist Party	
Mayurbhanj	132	Baisinga (SC)	Arjun Patra	Praja Socialist Party	
Mayurbhanj	133	Udala (ST)	Manmohan Tudu	Indian National Congress	
Mayurbhanj	134	Karanjia	Pravakar Behera	Indian National Congress	
Mayurbhanj	135	Jashipur (ST)	Mochiram Tiriya	Indian National Congress	
Mayurbhanj	136	Rairangpur (ST)	Chandra Mohan Singh	Indian National Congress	
Mayurbhanj	137	Bahalda (ST)	Sonaram Soren	Indian National Congress	
Mayurbhanj	138	Bangiriposi (ST)	Ishwar Chandra Nayak	Indian National Congress	Died in 1964.
Mayurbhanj	138	Bangiriposi (ST)	Prasanna Kumar Das	Indian National Congress	Elected in 1964 bypoll.
Mayurbhanj	139	Baripada	Santosh Kumar Sahu	Indian National Congress	
Mayurbhanj	140	Muruda (ST)	Sakila Soren	Praja Socialist Party	

== Bypolls ==
Source
Year	Constituency	Reason for by-poll	Winning candidate	Party
November 1961	Talcher	Resignation of Pabitra Mohan Pradhan	Madan Mohan Pradhan	Indian National Congress
June 1962	Kodala West	Resignation of Bishwanath Das	Banamali Maharana	Praja Socialist Party
April 1963	Jajpur West	Death of Madan Mohan Patnaik	Narayan Chandra Pati	Indian National Congress
April 1963	Khallikote	Death of Ramchandra Mardaraj Dev	V. Sugnana Kumari Deo	Indian National Congress
April 1963	Jharsuguda (ST)	Resignation of Binod Behari Singh Bariha	Binod Behari Singh Bariha	Indian National Congress
April 1964	Bangiriposi (ST)	Death of Ishwar Chandra Nayak	Prasanna Kumar Das	Indian National Congress
June 1965	Keonjhar	Death of Janardan Bhanj Deo	Karunakar Pradhan	Swatantra Party
