= Biren Mitra ministry =

Government of Odisha (1963 – 1965)

- 10th Ministry of Orissa
- 1963 – 1965
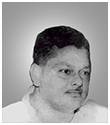
- Biren Mitra; Hon'ble Chief Minister of Orissa
- Date formed: 2 October 1963
- Date dissolved: 21 February 1965

People and organisations
- Governor: Ajudhiya Nath Khosla
- Chief Minister: Biren Mitra
- No. of ministers: 14
- Member parties: Indian National Congress
- Status in legislature: Majority
- Opposition party: All India Ganatantra Parishad
- Opposition leader: Rajendra Narayan Singh Deo

History
- Incoming formation: 3rd Orissa Legislative Assembly
- Election: 1961 Assembly election
- Legislature terms: 1 year, 142 days
- Predecessor: First Biju Patnaik ministry
- Successor: Sadashiva Tripathy ministry

Biren Mitra was sworn in as the chief minister of Orissa following resignation of Biju Patnaik under Kamaraj Plan.

== Brief history ==
After 1961 Assembly election, Congress returned to power in the state with Shri Biju Patnaik as the Chief Minister. Under Kamaraj Plan, Shri Patnaik resigned on 1963's Gandhi Jayanti to focus on rebuilding Congress Party in organisational level and reconnecting with the masses.

Shri Biren Mitra along with 8 Cabinet ministers and 5 Deputy Ministers were administered the oath of office and secrecy by Governor Ajudhiya Nath Khosla at the Raj Bhavan, Bhubaneswar on 2 October 1963.

With rising dissatisfaction with his style of governance and mounting corruption allegations, Shri Mitra was step down as CM on 21 February 1965. On same day, Shri Sadashiva Tripathy was sworn in as the Chief Minister of the state.

== Council of Ministers ==
Source
Portfolio	Portrait	Name Constituency	Tenure		Party
Chief Minister; Finance; Industries; Planning & Coordination; Mines & Geology; Irrigation & Power; Cultural Affairs; Local Self Government in Health; Other departments not allocated to any Minister.		Biren Mitra; MLA from Cuttack City	2 October 1963	21 February 1965	INC
Cabinet Minister
Political and Services; Home; Supply; Labour		Nilamani Routray; MLA from Basudebpur	2 October 1963	21 February 1965	INC
Revenue; Excise; Forest		Sadashiva Tripathy; MLA from Nowrangpur	2 October 1963	21 February 1965	INC
Education; Agriculture; Animal Husbandry; Co-operation		Satyapriya Mohanty; MLA from Bhubaneswar	2 October 1963	21 February 1965	INC
Health (excluding Local Self Government)		P. Venkat Jagannath Rao; MLA from Dura	2 October 1963	21 February 1965	INC
Works; Transport		Raja Saheb Harihar Singh Mardaraj Bhramarabara Roy; MLA from Khandapara	2 October 1963	21 February 1965	INC
Community Development & Panchayati Raj		Brundaban Nayak; MLA from Hinjili	2 October 1963	21 February 1965	INC
Tribal & Rural Welfare		Toyaka Sangana; MLA from Koraput	2 October 1963	21 February 1965	INC
Law		Banamali Babu; MLA from Attabira	2 October 1963	21 February 1965	INC
Deputy Minister
Irrigation & Power		Prahlad Mallik; MLA from Patamundai	2 October 1963	21 February 1965	INC
Transport; Animal Husbandry		Bir Bikramaditya Singh Bariha; MLA from Padampur	2 October 1963	21 February 1965	INC
Education		Saraswati Pradhan; MLA from Bhatli	2 October 1963	21 February 1965	INC
Jails in Home; Labour		Chandra Mohan Singh; MLA from Rairangpur	2 October 1963	21 February 1965	INC
Cultural Affairs; Local Self Government in Health; Co-operation		Santosh Kumar Sahu; MLA from Baripada	2 October 1963	21 February 1965	INC

== Demographics ==
Division	District	Ministers	Cabinet Ministers	Deputy Ministers
Central	Cuttack	2	Biren Mitra (Chief Minister)	Prahlad Mallik
Central	Puri	2	Satyapriya Mohanty; Harihar Singh Mardaraj	–
Central	Balasore	1	Nilamani Routray	–
Central	Mayurbhanj	2	–	Chandra Mohan Singh; Santosh Kumar Sahu
Northern	Sambalpur	3	Banamali Babu	Bir Bikramaditya Singh Bariha; Saraswati Pradhan
Northern	Sundergarh	0	–	–
Northern	Keonjhar	0	–	–
Northern	Dhenkanal	0	–	–
Northern	Balangir	0	–	–
Southern	Ganjam	2	P. Venkat Jagannath Rao; Brundaban Nayak	–
Southern	Kalahandi	0	–	–
Southern	Koraput	2	Sadashiva Tripathy; Toyaka Sangana	–
Southern	Phulbani	0	–	–
