= First Biju Patnaik ministry =

Government of Odisha (1961 – 1963)

- 9th Ministry of Orissa
- 1961 – 1963
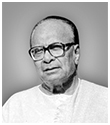
- Biju Patnaik; Hon'ble Chief Minister of Orissa
- Date formed: 23 June 1961
- Date dissolved: 2 October 1963

People and organisations
- Governor: Ajudhiya Nath Khosla
- Chief Minister: Biju Patnaik
- No. of ministers: 14
- Member parties: Indian National Congress
- Status in legislature: Majority
- Opposition party: All India Ganatantra Parishad
- Opposition leader: Rajendra Narayan Singh Deo

History
- Incoming formation: 3rd Orissa Legislative Assembly
- Outgoing formation: 2nd Orissa Legislative Assembly
- Election: 1961 Assembly election
- Legislature terms: 2 years, 101 days
- Predecessor: Third Harekrushna Mahatab ministry
- Successor: Biren Mitra ministry

Biju Patnaik was sworn in as the chief minister of Orissa for the first time following Congress astounding win in 1961 Assembly election.

== Brief history ==
In 1961 Assembly election, Congress led by Shri Biju Patnaik returned to power in the state with absolute majority. Shri Patnaik along with 6 Cabinet ministers and 7 Deputy Ministers were administered the oath of office and secrecy by Governor Ajudhiya Nath Khosla at the Raj Bhavan, Bhubaneswar on 23 June 1961.

Following India's setback in 1962 Indo China War, Congress adopted Kamaraj Plan. Accordingly, Shri Patnaik resigned as CM on 1963's Gandhi Jayanti to focus on rebuilding Congress party in organisational level and reconnect with the masses. On same day, Shri Biren Mitra was sworn in as the Chief Minister of the state.

== Council of Ministers ==
Source
| Portfolio | Portrait | Name Constituency | Tenure | | Party |
|---|---|---|---|---|---|
| Chief Minister; Finance; Fisheries, Co-operation & Marketing Organisation in Development; Mines & Geology; Appointment, Irrigation, Embankment, Drainage and Electricity in Works; Planning in Planning & Coordination; Other departments not allocated to any Minister. | | Biju Patnaik; MLA from Choudwar | 23 June 1961 | 2 October 1963 | INC |
Cabinet Minister
| Political and Services; Local Self Government in Health; Community Development & National Extension Service and Grama Panchayats, Co-ordination in Planning & Coordination | | Biren Mitra; MLA from Cuttack City | 23 June 1961 | 2 October 1963 | INC |
| Revenue; Excise; Forestry in Development | | Sadashiva Tripathy; MLA from Nowrangpur | 23 June 1961 | 2 October 1963 | INC |
| Education; Agriculture in Development; Tribal & Rural Welfare | | Pabitra Mohan Pradhan; MLA from Pal-lahara | 23 June 1961 | 2 October 1963 | INC |
| Home; Commerce; Supply; Labour | | Nilamani Routray; MLA from Basudebpur | 23 June 1961 | 2 October 1963 | INC |
| Health (excluding Local Self Government); Animal Husbandry in Development | | P. Venkat Jagannath Rao; MLA from Dura | 23 June 1961 | 2 October 1963 | INC |
| Roads & Buildings in Works; Transport | | Raja Saheb Harihar Singh Mardaraj Bhramarabara Roy; MLA from Khandapara | 23 June 1961 | 2 October 1963 | INC |
Deputy Minister
| Education | | Saraswati Pradhan; MLA from Bhatli | 23 June 1961 | 2 October 1963 | INC |
| Irrigation & Power | | Prahlad Mallik; MLA from Patamundai | 23 June 1961 | 2 October 1963 | INC |
| Fisheries; Co-operation | | Santosh Kumar Sahu; MLA from Baripada | 23 June 1961 | 2 October 1963 | INC |
| Community Development, Panchayats | | Brundaban Nayak; MLA from Hinjili | 23 June 1961 | 2 October 1963 | INC |
| Works; Transport; Agriculture | | Bir Bikramaditya Singh Bariha; MLA from Padampur | 23 June 1961 | 2 October 1963 | INC |
| Labour | | Chandra Mohan Singh; MLA from Rairangpur | 23 June 1961 | 2 October 1963 | INC |
| Tribal & Rural Welfare | | Toyaka Sangana; MLA from Koraput | 23 June 1961 | 2 October 1963 | INC |

== Demographics ==
| Division | District | Ministers | Cabinet Ministers | Deputy Ministers |
|---|---|---|---|---|
| Central | Cuttack | 2 | Biju Patnaik (Chief Minister); Biren Mitra | Prahlad Mallik |
| Central | Puri | 1 | Harihar Singh Mardaraj | – |
| Central | Balasore | 1 | Nilamani Routray | – |
| Central | Mayurbhanj | 2 | – | Chandra Mohan Singh; Santosh Kumar Sahu |
| Northern | Sambalpur | 2 | – | Bir Bikramaditya Singh Bariha; Saraswati Pradhan |
| Northern | Sundergarh | 0 | – | – |
| Northern | Keonjhar | 0 | – | – |
| Northern | Dhenkanal | 1 | Pabitra Mohan Pradhan | – |
| Northern | Balangir | 0 | – | – |
| Southern | Ganjam | 3 | P. Venkat Jagannath Rao; Brundaban Nayak | Brundaban Nayak |
| Southern | Kalahandi | 0 | – | – |
| Southern | Koraput | 2 | Sadashiva Tripathy | Toyaka Sangana |
| Southern | Phulbani | 0 | – | – |
