= 2nd Orissa Legislative Assembly =

2nd state legislature of the Indian state of Orissa

←	1st Assembly	3rd Assembly	→
- Orissa Legislative Assembly

Overview
- Meeting place: Sardar Patel Hall, Bhubaneshwar, Odisha, India
- Term: 1 April 1957 – 25 February 1961
- Election: 1957 Orissa Legislative Assembly election
- Government: INC+ (till 21/02/1959); INC + AIGP (after 21/02/1959)
- Opposition: Ganatantra Parishad (till 21/02/1959); Vacant (after 21/02/1959)
- Website: assembly.odisha.gov.in

Orissa Legislative Assembly
- House Composition
- Members: 140
- Governor: Bhim Sen Sachar; Y. N. Sukthankar
- Speaker: Nilakantha Das, INC
- Deputy Speaker: Jadumani Mangaraj, INC
- Leader of the House (Chief Minister): Harekrushna Mahatab, INC
- Leader of Opposition: Rajendra Narayan Singh Deo, AIGP (till 1959)
- Party control: INC+ (70/140) (till 21/02/1959); INC + AIGP (107/140) (after 21/02/1959)
- 7 Sessions with 254 sitting days

The Second Orissa Legislative Assembly was convened after the 1957 Orissa Legislative Assembly election.

== Brief History ==
Harekrushna Mahatab led Congress party emerged as the single largest party by winning 40% of the seats. On 29 May 1957, Shri Mahtab formed a minority government with the assured support from Jharkhand Party, Communist Party of India, and several Independent MLAs. In May 1959, for the first time in the state, A Coalition govt was formed when opposition led by Ganatantra Parishad joined in to give stable administration to the state. However, This ministry fell in 1961 over disagreement regarding the coalition in Congress party. For the first time in the state, President's rule was imposed & early elections were called.

== House Composition ==
Party	Strength
Indian National Congress	56
All India Ganatantra Parishad	51
Praja Socialist Party	11
Communist Party of India	9
Independent	13

== Office Bearers ==
Post	Portrait	Name	Tenure		Party
Governor		Bhim Sen Sachar	Assembly Begins	31 July 1957	N/A
Governor		Yashwant Narayan Sukthankar	31 July 1957	Assembly Dissolves	N/A
Speaker		Nilakantha Das; MLA from Satyabadi	27 May 1957	25 February 1961	Indian National Congress
Deputy Speaker		Jadumani Mangaraj; MLA from Barchana	29 May 1957	25 February 1961	Indian National Congress
Leader of the House (Chief Minister)		Harekrushna Mahatab; MLA from Soro	29 May 1957	25 February 1961	Indian National Congress
Leader of Opposition		Rajendra Narayan Singh Deo; MLA from Titlagarh	1 April 1957	22 May 1959	Ganatantra Parishad

== Council of Ministers ==
Third Harekrushna Mahatab Ministry

== Members of Legislative Assembly ==
Source
District	#	Constituency	Name	Party	Remarks
Koraput	1	Omerkote	Radhakrushna Biswas Ray	Indian National Congress	Candidate returned.
Koraput	1	Omerkote	Abdur Rahiman	Ganatantra Parishad	Elected in January 1959 bypoll.
Koraput	2	Nowrangpur	Sadasiba Tripathy	Indian National Congress	Candidate returned.
Koraput	2	Nowrangpur	Jagannath Tripathy	Indian National Congress	Elected in January 1960 bypoll.
Koraput	2	Nowrangpur (SC)	Harijan Miru	Indian National Congress	
Koraput	3	Jeypore	Harihar Mishra	Ganatantra Parishad	
Koraput	3	Jeypore (SC)	Laichhan Naik	Ganatantra Parishad	
Koraput	4	Malkangiri	Guru Nayak	Ganatantra Parishad	
Koraput	5	Padwa	Laxman Gouda	Ganatantra Parishad	
Koraput	6	Koraput	Laxmana Pujari	Ganatantra Parishad	
Koraput	7	Pottangi	Mallu Santa	Indian National Congress	
Koraput	8	Rayagada	Mandangi Kamaya	Indian National Congress	
Koraput	9	Gunupur	Naroshimho Patro	Indian National Congress	
Koraput	9	Gunupur (ST)	Sanyasi Charan Pidikaka	Indian National Congress	
Ganjam	10	Parlakimedi	Nalla Kurma Naikulu	Independent	
Ganjam	11	R. Udaigiri (ST)	Ramachandra Bhoya	Indian National Congress	
Ganjam	12	Digapahandi	Raghunath Mahapatra	Indian National Congress	
Ganjam	12	Digapahandi (SC)	Mohan Naik	Indian National Congress	
Ganjam	13	Berhampur	Lingaraj Panigrahi	Indian National Congress	
Ganjam	13	Berhampur (SC)	Dandapani Das	Indian National Congress	
Ganjam	14	Dura	P. Venkat Jagannath Rao	Indian National Congress	
Ganjam	15	Chatrapur	Yatiraj Praharaj	Indian National Congress	
Ganjam	16	Khallikote	Narayan Sahu	Independent	
Ganjam	17	Hinjili	Brundaban Nayak	Indian National Congress	
Ganjam	18	Kodala West	Harihar Das	Indian National Congress	
Ganjam	19	Kodala East	Ramchandra Mardaraj Dev	Indian National Congress	
Ganjam	20	Bhanjanagar	Govinda Pradhan	Communist Party of India	
Ganjam	20	Bhanjanagar (SC)	Suma Naik	Communist Party of India	
Ganjam	21	Aska	Harihar Das	Communist Party of India	
Ganjam	22	Suruda	Biju Patnaik	Indian National Congress	
Phulbani	23	Balliguda	Lokanath Patra	Ganatantra Parishad	
Phulbani	24	G. Udayagiri	Sarangdhar Pradhan	Ganatantra Parishad	
Phulbani	25	Phulbani	Himansu Sekhar Padhi	Ganatantra Parishad	
Phulbani	25	Phulbani (SC)	Anirudha Dipa	Ganatantra Parishad	
Kalahandi	26	Bhawanipatna	Pratap Keshari Deo	Ganatantra Parishad	Candidate returned.
Kalahandi	26	Bhawanipatna	Chandra Sekhar Pradhan	Ganatantra Parishad	Elected in 1957 bypoll.
Kalahandi	26	Bhawanipatna (ST)	Karunakar Bhoi	Ganatantra Parishad	
Kalahandi	27	Kasipur	Kishore Chandra Deo	Ganatantra Parishad	
Kalahandi	27	Kasipur (SC)	Manikrai Naik	Ganatantra Parishad	
Kalahandi	28	Dharamgarh	Birakeshari Deo	Ganatantra Parishad	
Kalahandi	28	Dharamgarh (ST)	Janardan Majhi	Ganatantra Parishad	
Kalahandi	29	Nawpara	Anupa Singh Deo	Indian National Congress	
Kalahandi	29	Nawpara (ST)	Ghasiram Majhi	Indian National Congress	
Bolangir	30	Titilagarh	Rajendra Narayan Singh Deo	Ganatantra Parishad	Leader of Opposition
Bolangir	30	Titilagarh (SC)	Achyutananda Mahananda	Ganatantra Parishad	
Bolangir	31	Patnagarh	Ainthu Sahoo	Ganatantra Parishad	
Bolangir	31	Patnagarh (ST)	Asharam Bhoi	Ganatantra Parishad	
Bolangir	32	Loisingha	Ram Prasad Mishra	Ganatantra Parishad	
Bolangir	33	Bolangir	Nandakishore Mishra	Ganatantra Parishad	
Bolangir	33	Bolangir (ST)	Ramesh Chandra Bhoi	Ganatantra Parishad	
Bolangir	34	Sonepur	Anantaram Nanda	Ganatantra Parishad	
Bolangir	34	Sonepur (SC)	Daulata Ganda	Ganatantra Parishad	
Sambalpur	35	Padampur	L.M.S. Bariha	Ganatantra Parishad	
Sambalpur	35	Padampur (ST)	Bir Bikramaditya Singh Bariha	Indian National Congress	
Sambalpur	36	Bargarh	Nikunja Bihari Singh	Ganatantra Parishad	
Sambalpur	36	Bargarh (SC)	Mahananda Bahadur	Ganatantra Parishad	
Sambalpur	37	Bhatli	Natabar Banchhor	Communist Party of India	
Sambalpur	38	Sambalpur	Lakshmiprasad Misra	Ganatantra Parishad	
Sambalpur	38	Sambalpur (SC)	Bhikari Ghasi	Ganatantra Parishad	
Sambalpur	39	Katarbaga	Purusottam Panda	Ganatantra Parishad	
Sambalpur	40	Deogarh	Rani Jyotimanjari Debi	Ganatantra Parishad	
Sambalpur	40	Deogarh (ST)	Jayadev Thakur	Ganatantra Parishad	
Sambalpur	41	Jharsuguda	Bijoy Kumar Pani	Indian National Congress	
Sambalpur	41	Jharsuguda (ST)	Manohar Singh Naik	Indian National Congress	
Sundergarh	42	Sundergarh	Udit Pratap Sekhar Deo	Ganatantra Parishad	
Sundergarh	42	Sundergarh (ST)	Gangadhar Pradhan	Ganatantra Parishad	
Sundergarh	43	Rajgangpur (ST)	Santi Prakash Oram	Independent	
Sundergarh	44	Bisra (ST)	Nirmala Munda	Independent	
Sundergarh	45	Bonai (ST)	Arjun Naik	Ganatantra Parishad	
Keonjhar	46	Champua	Raj Ballabh Mishra	Ganatantra Parishad	
Keonjhar	46	Champua (ST)	Guru Charan Naik	Ganatantra Parishad	
Keonjhar	47	Keonjhar	Janardan Bhanj Deo	Ganatantra Parishad	
Keonjhar	47	Keonjhar (ST)	Krushna Chandra Mahapatro	Independent	
Keonjhar	48	Anandapur	Upendra Jena	Ganatantra Parishad	Candidate returned
Keonjhar	48	Anandapur	Narasingha Narayan Bhanja Deo	Indian National Congress	Elected in 1958 bypoll; Candidate returned.
Keonjhar	48	Anandapur	Upendra Jena	Ganatantra Parishad	Elected in April 1959 bypoll.
Keonjhar	48	Anandapur (SC)	Bira Kishore Jena	Ganatantra Parishad	Candidate returned
Keonjhar	48	Anandapur (SC)	Makar Sethi	Indian National Congress	Elected in 1958 bypoll.
Dhenkanal	49	Pal-lahara	Mrutyunjaya Pal	Ganatantra Parishad	
Dhenkanal	50	Talcher	Pabitra Mohan Pradhan	Indian National Congress	
Dhenkanal	51	Kamakhyanagar	Ratnaprava Devi	Ganatantra Parishad	
Dhenkanal	52	Dhenkanal	Shankar Pratap Singh Deo Mahendra Bahadur Raja	Ganatantra Parishad	
Dhenkanal	52	Dhenkanal (ST)	Kalia Dehuri	Ganatantra Parishad	
Dhenkanal	53	Angul	Kumud Chandra Singh	Independent	
Dhenkanal	53	Angul (SC)	Narendra Kumar Nayak	Communist Party of India	
Dhenkanal	54	Athmallik	Khetra Mohan Panigrahi	Ganatantra Parishad	
Puri	55	Daspalla	Rajabahadur Kishore Chandra Deo Bhanj	Indian National Congress	Died on 1960.
Puri	55	Daspalla	Raja Purna Chandra Bhanjadeo	Indian National Congress	Elected in March 1960 bypoll.
Puri	55	Daspalla (SC)	Sridhar Naik	Ganatantra Parishad	
Puri	56	Khandpara	Raja Saheb Harihar Singh Mardaraj Bhramarabara Roy	Indian National Congress	
Puri	57	Nayagarh	Krushna Chandra Singh Mandhata	Independent	
Puri	58	Ranpur	Basant Manjari Devi	Indian National Congress	
Puri	59	Begunia	Satyananda Champatiray	Indian National Congress	
Puri	60	Khurda	Prananath Pattnaik	Communist Party of India	
Puri	61	Bhubaneswar	Satyapriya Mohanty	Indian National Congress	
Puri	62	Brahmagiri	Padma Charan Samantasinghar	Indian National Congress	
Puri	63	Puri	Harihar Bahinipati	Praja Socialist Party	
Puri	64	Satyabadi	Nilakantha Das	Indian National Congress	Speaker
Puri	65	Pipili	Ram Chandra Patnaik	Independent	
Puri	65	Pipili (SC)	Gopinath Bhoi	Indian National Congress	
Puri	66	Kakatpur	Mohan Das	Communist Party of India	
Puri	66	Kakatpur (SC)	Bharat Das	Communist Party of India	
Cuttack	67	Banki	Jogesh Chandra Rout	Indian National Congress	
Cuttack	68	Baramba	Rani Saheba Kanaklata Devi	Ganatantra Parishad	
Cuttack	69	Athgarh	Radhanath Rath	Indian National Congress	
Cuttack	70	Cuttack City	Biren Mitra	Indian National Congress	
Cuttack	71	Cuttack Sadar	Raj Krushna Bose	Indian National Congress	
Cuttack	71	Cuttack Sadar (SC)	Purnananda Samal	Indian National Congress	
Cuttack	72	Jagatsinghpur	Nilamani Pradhan	Indian National Congress	Candidate returned
Cuttack	72	Jagatsinghpur	Bira Kishore Das	Indian National Congress	Elected in February 1959 bypoll.
Cuttack	72	Jagatsinghpur (SC)	Kanduri Charan Mallik	Praja Socialist Party	
Cuttack	73	Salepur (SC)	Pradipta Kishore Das	Praja Socialist Party	
Cuttack	73	Salepur	Baidhar Behera	Praja Socialist Party	
Cuttack	74	Balikuda	Baikunthanath Mohanty	Praja Socialist Party	
Cuttack	75	Ersama	Lokanath Choudhury	Communist Party of India	
Cuttack	76	Tirtol	Nishamani Khuntia	Praja Socialist Party	
Cuttack	77	Patkura	Lokanath Mishra	Indian National Congress	
Cuttack	78	Rajnagar	Ananta Charan Tripathy	Independent	
Cuttack	79	Aul	Raja Sailendra Narayan Bhanja Deo	Indian National Congress	
Cuttack	80	Kendrapara	Dinabandhu Sahoo	Praja Socialist Party	
Cuttack	80	Kendrapara (SC)	Prahlad Mallik	Indian National Congress	
Cuttack	81	Binjharpur	Banka Behari Das	Praja Socialist Party	
Cuttack	82	Barchana	Jadumani Mangaraj	Indian National Congress	Deputy Speaker
Cuttack	83	Dharmasala	Madan Mohan Patnaik	Indian National Congress	
Cuttack	83	Dharmasala (SC)	Mayadhar Singh	Indian National Congress	
Cuttack	84	Jajpur	Gadadhar Dutta	Indian National Congress	
Cuttack	84	Jajpur (SC)	Santanu Kumar Das	Indian National Congress	
Balasore	85	Dhamnagar	Muralidhar Jena	Indian National Congress	
Balasore	86	Chandbali	Nilamani Routray	Indian National Congress	
Balasore	86	Chandbali (SC)	Nanda Kishore Jena	Indian National Congress	
Balasore	87	Bhadrak	Nityananda Mahapatra	Independent	
Balasore	88	Soro	Harekrushna Mahatab	Indian National Congress	Chief Minister
Balasore	88	Soro (SC)	Chaitanya Prasad Sethi	Indian National Congress	
Balasore	89	Nilgiri	Nilambar Das	Indian National Congress	
Balasore	90	Balasore	Rabindra Mohan Das	Praja Socialist Party	
Balasore	91	Basta	Akshaya Narayana Praharaja	Indian National Congress	Candidate returned.
Balasore	91	Basta	Akshaya Narayana Praharaja	Indian National Congress	Elected in 1958 bypoll.
Balasore	92	Bhograi	Durga Sankar Das	Indian National Congress	
Balasore	93	Jaleswar	Prasanna Kumar Paul	Praja Socialist Party	
Mayurbhanj	94	Baisinga	Prasanna Kumar Dash	Praja Socialist Party	
Mayurbhanj	94	Baisinga (SC)	Panchanan Das	Praja Socialist Party	
Mayurbhanj	95	Udala	Manmohan Tudu	Indian National Congress	
Mayurbhanj	96	Karanjia	Lal Saheb Nalini Chandra Bhanj Deo	Ganatantra Parishad	
Mayurbhanj	97	Jashipur	Mochiram Tiriya	Ganatantra Parishad	
Mayurbhanj	98	Rairangpur	Haradeb Triya	Independent	
Mayurbhanj	99	Bahalda	Sundar Mohan Hemrom	Independent	
Mayurbhanj	100	Bangiriposi	Radhamohan Nayak	Ganatantra Parishad	
Mayurbhanj	101	Baripada	Harihar Mohanty	Praja Socialist Party	
Mayurbhanj	101	Baripada (ST)	Samai Majhi	Independent	

== Bypolls ==
Source
Year	Constituency	Reason for by-poll	Winning candidate	Party
June 1957	Bhawanipatna	Candidate returned	Chandra Sekhar Pradhan	Ganatantra Parishad
May 1958	Anandapur	Candidate returned	Narasingha Narayan Bhanja Deo	Indian National Congress
May 1958	Anandapur (SC)	Candidate returned	Makar Sethi	Indian National Congress
May 1958	Basta	Candidate returned	Akshaya Narayana Praharaja	Indian National Congress
January 1959	Omerkote	Candidate returned	Abdur Rahiman	Ganatantra Parishad
February 1959	Jagatsinghpur	Candidate returned	Bira Kishore Das	Indian National Congress
April 1959	Anandapur	Candidate returned	Upendra Jena	Ganatantra Parishad
January 1960	Nowrangpur	Candidate returned	Jagannath Tripathy	Indian National Congress
March 1960	Daspalla	Death of Rajabahadur Kishore Chandra Deo Bhanj	Raja Purna Chandra Bhanjadeo	Indian National Congress
