= Sadashiva Tripathy ministry =

Government of Odisha (1965 – 1967)

- 11th Ministry of Orissa
- 1965 – 1967
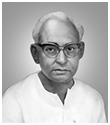
- Sadashiva Tripathy; Hon'ble Chief Minister of Orissa
- Date formed: 21 February 1965
- Date dissolved: 8 March 1967

People and organisations
- Governor: Ajudhiya Nath Khosla
- Chief Minister: Sadashiva Tripathy
- No. of ministers: 14
- Member parties: Indian National Congress
- Status in legislature: Majority
- Opposition party: All India Ganatantra Parishad
- Opposition leader: Rajendra Narayan Singh Deo

History
- Incoming formation: 3rd Orissa Legislative Assembly
- Election: 1961 Assembly election
- Legislature terms: 2 years, 15 days
- Predecessor: Biren Mitra ministry
- Successor: Rajendra Narayan Singh Deo ministry

Sadashiva Tripathy was sworn in as the chief minister of Orissa following resignation of Biren Mitra.

== Brief history ==
After 1961 Assembly election, Congress returned to power in the state with Shri Biju Patnaik as the Chief Minister. Under Kamaraj Plan, Shri Patnaik resigned on 1963 and Shri Biren Mitra was sworn in as CM. With rising dissatisfaction with his style of governance and mounting corruption allegations, Shri Mitra step down as CM.

Shri Sadashiva Tripathy along with 6 Cabinet ministers and 7 Deputy ministers were administered the oath of office and secrecy by Governor Ajudhiya Nath Khosla at the Raj Bhavan, Bhubaneswar on 21 February 1965.

Shri Tripathy resigned on 8 March 1967 following Congress's defeat in 1967 Orissa Legislative Assembly election.

== Council of Ministers ==
Source
Portfolio	Portrait	Name Constituency	Tenure		Party
Chief Minister; Finance; Industries; Planning & Coordination; Mines & Geology; Irrigation & Power; Other departments not allocated to any Minister.		Sadashiva Tripathy; MLA from Nowrangpur	21 February 1965	8 March 1967	INC
Commerce; Revenue (excluding Registration of Deeds, Documents, Mahammedan Marriage and control of Offices in Registration Department); Forestry; Community Development & Panchayati Raj		Sadashiva Tripathy; MLA from Nowrangpur	21 February 1965	3 September 1966	INC
Matters relating to Shri Jagannath Temple, Puri, Hindu Religious Endowment in Law		Sadashiva Tripathy; MLA from Nowrangpur	3 September 1966	8 March 1967	INC
Cabinet Minister
Political and Services; Home; Supply; Labour & Employment; Housing		Nilamani Routray; MLA from Basudebpur	21 February 1965	25 February 1967	INC
Commerce; Forestry		Nilamani Routray; MLA from Basudebpur	3 September 1966	25 February 1967	INC
Education; Transport		Satyapriya Mohanty; MLA from Bhubaneswar	21 February 1965	8 March 1967	INC
Works		Satyapriya Mohanty; MLA from Bhubaneswar	21 February 1965	3 September 1966	INC
Works (excepting Public Health Engineering); Excise		Satyapriya Mohanty; MLA from Bhubaneswar	3 September 1966	8 March 1967	INC
Health (excluding Local Self Government)		P. Venkat Jagannath Rao; MLA from Dura	21 February 1965	8 March 1967	INC
Tribal & Rural Welfare		Toyaka Sangana; MLA from Koraput	21 February 1965	27 February 1967	INC
Registration of Deeds, Documents, Mahammedan Marriage and control of Offices in Registration Department in Revenue		Toyaka Sangana; MLA from Koraput	21 February 1965	3 September 1966	INC
Law; Local Self Government in Health		Banamali Babu; MLA from Attabira	21 February 1965	3 September 1966	INC
Law (excluding Matters relating to Shri Jagannath Temple, Puri, Hindu Religious Endowment); Local Self Government in Health		Banamali Babu; MLA from Attabira	3 September 1966	8 March 1967	INC
Agriculture; Co-operation		Ram Prasad Mishra; MLA from Loisingha	21 February 1965	25 February 1967	INC
Animal Husbandry		Ram Prasad Mishra; MLA from Loisingha	21 February 1965	3 September 1966	INC
Community Development & Panchayati Raj		Ram Prasad Mishra; MLA from Loisingha	3 September 1966	25 February 1967	INC
Deputy Minister
Irrigation & Power; Betterment levy of water rate & cess in Revenue		Prahlad Mallik; MLA from Patamundai	21 February 1965	8 March 1967	INC
Finance		Prahlad Mallik; MLA from Patamundai	3 September 1966	8 March 1967	INC
Education		Saraswati Pradhan; MLA from Bhatli	21 February 1965	8 March 1967	INC
Forestry; Mines & Geology		Santosh Kumar Sahu; MLA from Baripada	21 February 1965	8 March 1967	INC
Cultural Affairs		Santosh Kumar Sahu; MLA from Baripada	21 February 1965	3 September 1966	INC
Co-operation		Santosh Kumar Sahu; MLA from Baripada	3 September 1966	8 March 1967	INC
Labour & Employment; Housing; Excise		Chandra Mohan Singh; MLA from Rairangpur	21 February 1965	8 March 1967	INC
Registration in Revenue; Jails in Home		Chandra Mohan Singh; MLA from Rairangpur	21 February 1965	3 September 1966	INC
Revenue		Chandra Mohan Singh; MLA from Rairangpur	3 September 1966	8 March 1967	INC
Industries; Commerce; Transport		Chittaranjan Naik; MLA from Binjharpur	21 February 1965	26 February 1967	INC
Community Development & Panchayati Raj; Public Relations in Home		Anupa Singh Deo; MLA from Khariar	21 February 1965	8 March 1967	INC
Agriculture; Animal Husbandry		Madan Mohan Pradhan; MLA from Talcher	2 October 1963	26 February 1967	INC

== Demographics ==
Division	District	Ministers	Cabinet Ministers	Deputy Ministers
Central	Cuttack	2	–	Prahlad Mallik; Chittaranjan Naik
Central	Puri	1	Satyapriya Mohanty	–
Central	Balasore	1	Nilamani Routray	–
Central	Mayurbhanj	2	–	Chandra Mohan Singh; Santosh Kumar Sahu
Northern	Sambalpur	2	Banamali Babu	Saraswati Pradhan
Northern	Sundergarh	0	–	–
Northern	Keonjhar	0	–	–
Northern	Dhenkanal	1	–	Madan Mohan Pradhan
Northern	Balangir	1	Ram Prasad Mishra	–
Southern	Ganjam	1	P. Venkat Jagannath Rao	–
Southern	Kalahandi	1	–	Anupa Singh Deo
Southern	Koraput	2	Sadashiva Tripathy (Chief Minister); Toyaka Sangana	–
Southern	Phulbani	0	–	–
