= 1957 Orissa Legislative Assembly election =

Second legislative assembly election in Orissa, India

- February 24, 25, 28, March 1–12, 1957

All 140 seats across 101 constituencies in the 2nd Orissa Legislative Assembly 71 seats needed for a majority
- Registered: 79,83,975 (▲5.08%)
- Turnout: 34.14% (▼0.05 pp)
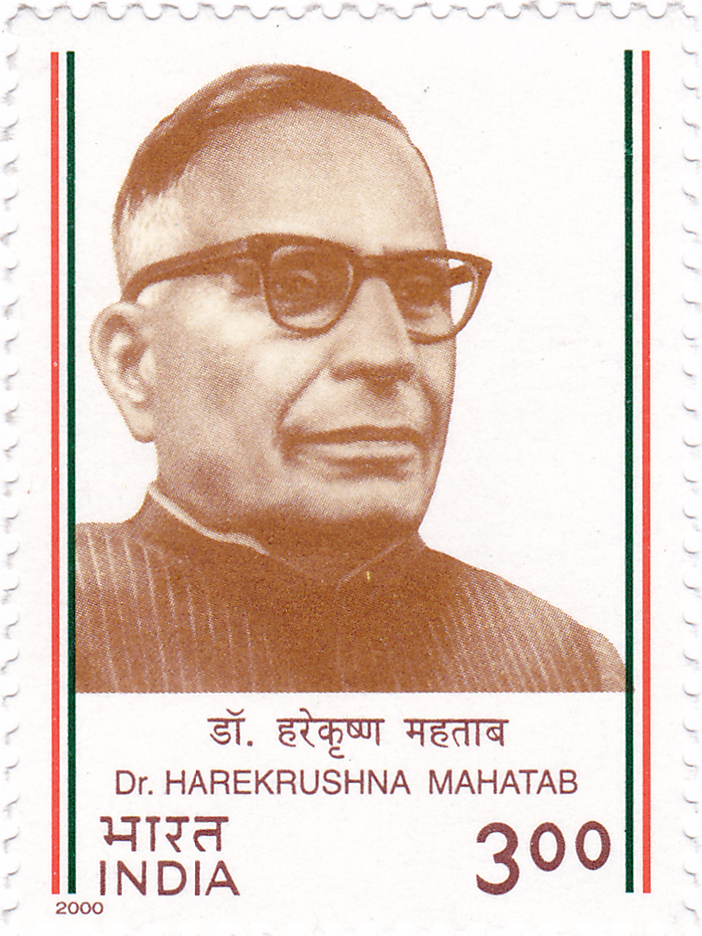

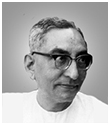

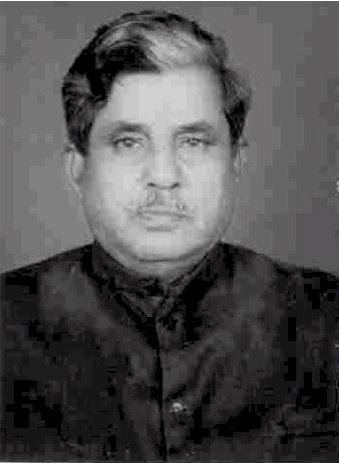

	First party	Second party	Third party
Leader	Harekrushna Mahatab	Rajendra Narayan Singh Deo	Prasanna Kumar Dash
Party	Indian National Congress	All India Ganatantra Parishad	Praja Socialist Party
Leader since	19 October 1956	October 1950	September 1952
Leader's seat	Soro	Titlagarh	Baisinga
Last election	67 seats, 37.87%	31 seats, 20.50%	10 seats, 12.23% (Note: Combined 1952 performance of the Socialist Party (10 seats; 11.77%) and the Kisan Mazdoor Praja Party (0 seats; 0.46%), which merged in September 1952 to form the Praja Socialist Party.)
Seats won	56	51	11
Seat change	▼11	▲20	▲1
Popular vote	1,628,180	1,223,014	442,508
Percentage	38.26%	28.74%	10.40%
Swing	▲0.39 pp	▲8.24 pp	▼1.83 pp
	Fourth party	Fifth party
Leader	Prananath Patnaik
Party	Communist Party of India	Independents
Leader's seat	Khurda
Last election	7 seats, 5.62%	24 seats, 22.94%
Seats won	9	13
Seat change	▲2	▼11
Popular vote	357,659	604,652
Percentage	8.40%	14.21%
Swing	▲2.78 pp	▼8.73 pp
- Composition of the 2nd Orissa Legislative Assembly after the election
Chief Minister before election
Harekrushna Mahatab
INC
Elected Chief Minister
Harekrushna Mahatab
INC

The 1957 Orissa Legislative Assembly election was held from 24 February to 12 March 1957 to elect 140 members to the 2nd Orissa Legislative Assembly. Conducted concurrently with the 1957 Indian general election, the election followed the 1956 delimitation of constituencies, which reorganised the 140 seats into 101 constituencies comprising 62 single-member constituencies and 39 two-member constituencies reserved for Scheduled Castes and Scheduled Tribes.

The election resulted in a hung assembly. The ruling Indian National Congress (INC), led by Chief Minister Harekrushna Mahatab, remained the single largest party with 56 seats and 38.26% of the popular vote, falling 15 seats short of the 71-seat majority mark. The All India Ganatantra Parishad (GP), led by Rajendra Narayan Singh Deo, gained 20 seats to finish a close second with 51 seats and 28.74% of the vote. The Praja Socialist Party won 11 seats (10.40%), the Communist Party of India won 9 seats (8.40%), and independent candidates won 13 seats (14.21%).

On 6 April 1957, Harekrushna Mahatab formed a minority Congress ministry with the support of independent and Jharkhand Party legislators, while Rajendra Narayan Singh Deo became Leader of the Opposition. After two years of narrow legislative majorities, the Congress and the Ganatantra Parishad formed a coalition ministry on 22 May 1959. The coalition governed until 21 February 1961, when Mahatab resigned due to differences within the Congress party, leading to the imposition of President's rule in Orissa for the first time on 25 February 1961.

== Constituencies ==
The elections were held for 140 seats of 101 constituencies. Out of 101 constituencies, 62 constituencies were single-membered while 39 constituencies were two-membered. In two-membered constituencies, one seat was open while other was reserved. Out of 39 two-member constituencies, 25 were reserved for Scheduled Caste and 14 were reserved for Scheduled Tribe. Also, 4 single-member constituencies were reserved for Scheduled Tribe. A total of 517 candidates contested for these 140 seats.

== Political parties ==
Three national parties, Communist Party of India, Congress and Praja Socialist Party along with the state party Ganatantra Parishad took part in the assembly election.

== Results ==
Source: Election Commission of India
Party				Popular vote			Seats		
Color	Flag	Name	Symbol	Votes	%	±pp	Contested	Won	+/−
		Indian National Congress		1,628,180	38.26%	▲0.39	140	56	▼11
		Ganatantra Parishad		1,223,014	28.74%	▲8.24	109	51	▲20
		Praja Socialist Party		322,305	10.99%	▼1.24	46	11	▲1
		Communist Party of India		357,659	8.40%	▲2.78	43	9	▲2
	-	Independents	-	604,652	14.21%	▼8.73	171	13	▼11
Total				-	-	-	-	140	-
Valid Votes				4,256,013	34.14				
Invalid Votes				145,456	-				
Total Votes polled / turnout				4,401,469	35.30				
Abstentation				8,066,331					
Total No. of Votes (Note: 1 X single member electors + 2 X double member electors)				12,467,800					
Total No. of Electors (Note: single member electors + double member electors)				7,983,975					

== Elected members ==
District	#	Constituency Name	Winner	Party
Koraput	1	Omerkote	Radhakrushna Biswas Ray	Indian National Congress
Koraput	2	Nowrangpur	Sadasiba Tripathy	Indian National Congress
Koraput	2	Nowrangpur (SC)	Harijan Miru	Indian National Congress
Koraput	3	Jeypore	Harihar Mishra	Ganatantra Parishad
Koraput	3	Jeypore (SC)	Laichhan Naik	Ganatantra Parishad
Koraput	4	Malkangiri	Guru Nayak	Ganatantra Parishad
Koraput	5	Padwa	Laxman Gouda	Ganatantra Parishad
Koraput	6	Koraput	Laxmana Pujari	Ganatantra Parishad
Koraput	7	Pottangi	Mallu Santa	Indian National Congress
Koraput	8	Rayagada	Mandangi Kamaya	Indian National Congress
Koraput	9	Gunupur	Naroshimho Patro	Indian National Congress
Koraput	9	Gunupur (ST)	Sanyasi Charan Pidikaka	Indian National Congress
Ganjam	10	Parlakimedi	Nalla Kurma Naikulu	Independent
Ganjam	11	R. Udaigiri (ST)	Ramachandra Bhoya	Indian National Congress
Ganjam	12	Digapahandi	Raghunath Mahapatra	Indian National Congress
Ganjam	12	Digapahandi (SC)	Mohan Naik	Indian National Congress
Ganjam	13	Berhampur	Lingaraj Panigrahi	Indian National Congress
Ganjam	13	Berhampur (SC)	Dandapani Das	Indian National Congress
Ganjam	14	Dura	P. Venkat Jagannath Rao	Indian National Congress
Ganjam	15	Chatrapur	Yatiraj Praharaj	Indian National Congress
Ganjam	16	Khallikote	Narayan Sahu	Independent
Ganjam	17	Hinjili	Brundaban Nayak	Indian National Congress
Ganjam	18	Kodala West	Harihar Das	Indian National Congress
Ganjam	19	Kodala East	Ramchandra Mardaraj Dev	Indian National Congress
Ganjam	20	Bhanjanagar	Govinda Pradhan	Communist Party of India
Ganjam	20	Bhanjanagar (SC)	Suma Naik	Communist Party of India
Ganjam	21	Aska	Harihar Das	Communist Party of India
Ganjam	22	Suruda	Biju Patnaik	Indian National Congress
Phulbani	23	Balliguda	Lokanath Patra	Ganatantra Parishad
Phulbani	24	G. Udayagiri	Sarangdhar Pradhan	Ganatantra Parishad
Phulbani	25	Phulbani	Himansu Sekhar Padhi	Ganatantra Parishad
Phulbani	25	Phulbani (SC)	Anirudha Dipa	Ganatantra Parishad
Kalahandi	26	Bhawanipatna	Pratap Keshari Deo	Ganatantra Parishad
Kalahandi	26	Bhawanipatna (ST)	Karunakar Bhoi	Ganatantra Parishad
Kalahandi	27	Kasipur	Kishore Chandra Deo	Ganatantra Parishad
Kalahandi	27	Kasipur (SC)	Manikrai Naik	Ganatantra Parishad
Kalahandi	28	Dharamgarh	Birakeshari Deo	Ganatantra Parishad
Kalahandi	28	Dharamgarh (ST)	Janardan Majhi	Ganatantra Parishad
Kalahandi	29	Nawpara	Anupa Singh Deo	Indian National Congress
Kalahandi	29	Nawpara (ST)	Ghasiram Majhi	Indian National Congress
Bolangir	30	Titilagarh	Rajendra Narayan Singh Deo	Ganatantra Parishad
Bolangir	30	Titilagarh (SC)	Achyutananda Mahananda	Ganatantra Parishad
Bolangir	31	Patnagarh	Ainthu Sahoo	Ganatantra Parishad
Bolangir	31	Patnagarh (ST)	Asharam Bhoi	Ganatantra Parishad
Bolangir	32	Loisingha	Ram Prasad Mishra	Ganatantra Parishad
Bolangir	33	Bolangir	Nandakishore Mishra	Ganatantra Parishad
Bolangir	33	Bolangir (ST)	Ramesh Chandra Bhoi	Ganatantra Parishad
Bolangir	34	Sonepur	Anantaram Nanda	Ganatantra Parishad
Bolangir	34	Sonepur (SC)	Daulata Ganda	Ganatantra Parishad
Sambalpur	35	Padampur	L.M.S. Bariha	Ganatantra Parishad
Sambalpur	35	Padampur (ST)	Bir Bikramaditya Singh Bariha	Indian National Congress
Sambalpur	36	Bargarh	Nikunja Bihari Singh	Ganatantra Parishad
Sambalpur	36	Bargarh (SC)	Mahananda Bahadur	Ganatantra Parishad
Sambalpur	37	Bhatli	Natabar Banchhor	Communist Party of India
Sambalpur	38	Sambalpur	Lakshmiprasad Misra	Ganatantra Parishad
Sambalpur	38	Sambalpur (SC)	Bhikari Ghasi	Ganatantra Parishad
Sambalpur	39	Katarbaga	Purusottam Panda	Ganatantra Parishad
Sambalpur	40	Deogarh	Rani Jyotimanjari Debi	Ganatantra Parishad
Sambalpur	40	Deogarh (ST)	Jayadev Thakur	Ganatantra Parishad
Sambalpur	41	Jharsuguda	Bijoy Kumar Pani	Indian National Congress
Sambalpur	41	Jharsuguda (ST)	Manohar Singh Naik	Indian National Congress
Sundergarh	42	Sundergarh	Udit Pratap Sekhar Deo	Ganatantra Parishad
Sundergarh	42	Sundergarh (ST)	Gangadhar Pradhan	Ganatantra Parishad
Sundergarh	43	Rajgangpur (ST)	Santi Prakash Oram	Independent
Sundergarh	44	Bisra (ST)	Nirmala Munda	Independent
Sundergarh	45	Bonai (ST)	Arjun Naik	Ganatantra Parishad
Keonjhar	46	Champua	Raj Ballabh Mishra	Ganatantra Parishad
Keonjhar	46	Champua (ST)	Guru Charan Naik	Ganatantra Parishad
Keonjhar	47	Keonjhar	Janardan Bhanj Deo	Ganatantra Parishad
Keonjhar	47	Keonjhar (ST)	Krushna Chandra Mahapatro	Independent
Keonjhar	48	Anandapur	Upendra Jena	Ganatantra Parishad
Keonjhar	48	Anandapur (SC)	Bira Kishore Jena	Ganatantra Parishad
Dhenkanal	49	Pal-lahara	Mrutyunjaya Pal	Ganatantra Parishad
Dhenkanal	50	Talcher	Pabitra Mohan Pradhan	Indian National Congress
Dhenkanal	51	Kamakhyanagar	Ratnaprava Devi	Ganatantra Parishad
Dhenkanal	52	Dhenkanal	Shankar Pratap Singh Deo Mahendra Bahadur Raja	Ganatantra Parishad
Dhenkanal	52	Dhenkanal (ST)	Kalia Dehuri	Ganatantra Parishad
Dhenkanal	53	Angul	Kumud Chandra Singh	Independent
Dhenkanal	53	Angul (SC)	Narendra Kumar Nayak	Communist Party of India
Dhenkanal	54	Athmallik	Khetra Mohan Panigrahi	Ganatantra Parishad
Puri	55	Daspalla	Rajabahadur Kishore Chandra Deo Bhanj	Indian National Congress
Puri	55	Daspalla (SC)	Sridhar Naik	Ganatantra Parishad
Puri	56	Khandpara	Raja Saheb Harihar Singh Mardaraj Bhramarabara Roy	Indian National Congress
Puri	57	Nayagarh	Krushna Chandra Singh Mandhata	Independent
Puri	58	Ranpur	Basant Manjari Devi	Indian National Congress
Puri	59	Begunia	Satyananda Champatiray	Indian National Congress
Puri	60	Khurda	Prananath Pattnaik	Communist Party of India
Puri	61	Bhubaneswar	Satyapriya Mohanty	Indian National Congress
Puri	62	Brahmagiri	Padma Charan Samantasinghar	Indian National Congress
Puri	63	Puri	Harihar Bahinipati	Praja Socialist Party
Puri	64	Satyabadi	Nilakantha Das	Indian National Congress
Puri	65	Pipili	Ram Chandra Patnaik	Independent
Puri	65	Pipili (SC)	Gopinath Bhoi	Indian National Congress
Puri	66	Kakatpur	Mohan Das	Communist Party of India
Puri	66	Kakatpur (SC)	Bharat Das	Communist Party of India
Cuttack	67	Banki	Jogesh Chandra Rout	Indian National Congress
Cuttack	68	Baramba	Rani Saheba Kanaklata Devi	Ganatantra Parishad
Cuttack	69	Athgarh	Radhanath Rath	Indian National Congress
Cuttack	70	Cuttack City	Biren Mitra	Indian National Congress
Cuttack	71	Cuttack Sadar	Raj Krushna Bose	Indian National Congress
Cuttack	71	Cuttack Sadar (SC)	Purnananda Samal	Indian National Congress
Cuttack	72	Jagatsinghpur	Nilamani Pradhan	Indian National Congress
Cuttack	72	Jagatsinghpur (SC)	Kanduri Charan Mallik	Praja Socialist Party
Cuttack	73	Salepur (SC)	Pradipta Kishore Das	Praja Socialist Party
Cuttack	73	Salepur	Baidhar Behera	Praja Socialist Party
Cuttack	74	Balikuda	Baikunthanath Mohanty	Praja Socialist Party
Cuttack	75	Ersama	Lokanath Choudhury	Communist Party of India
Cuttack	76	Tirtol	Nishamani Khuntia	Praja Socialist Party
Cuttack	77	Patkura	Lokanath Mishra	Indian National Congress
Cuttack	78	Rajnagar	Ananta Charan Tripathy	Independent
Cuttack	79	Aul	Raja Sailendra Narayan Bhanja Deo	Indian National Congress
Cuttack	80	Kendrapara	Dinabandhu Sahoo	Praja Socialist Party
Cuttack	80	Kendrapara (SC)	Prahlad Mallik	Indian National Congress
Cuttack	81	Binjharpur	Banka Behari Das	Praja Socialist Party
Cuttack	82	Barchana	Jadumani Mangaraj	Indian National Congress
Cuttack	83	Dharmasala	Madan Mohan Patnaik	Indian National Congress
Cuttack	83	Dharmasala (SC)	Mayadhar Singh	Indian National Congress
Cuttack	84	Jajpur	Gadadhar Dutta	Indian National Congress
Cuttack	84	Jajpur (SC)	Santanu Kumar Das	Indian National Congress
Balasore	85	Dhamnagar	Muralidhar Jena	Indian National Congress
Balasore	86	Chandbali	Nilamani Routray	Indian National Congress
Balasore	86	Chandbali (SC)	Nanda Kishore Jena	Indian National Congress
Balasore	87	Bhadrak	Nityananda Mahapatra	Independent
Balasore	88	Soro	Harekrushna Mahatab	Indian National Congress
Balasore	88	Soro (SC)	Chaitanya Prasad Sethi	Indian National Congress
Balasore	89	Nilgiri	Nilambar Das	Indian National Congress
Balasore	90	Balasore	Rabindra Mohan Das	Praja Socialist Party
Balasore	91	Basta	Akshaya Narayana Praharaja	Indian National Congress
Balasore	92	Bhograi	Durga Sankar Das	Indian National Congress
Balasore	93	Jaleswar	Prasanna Kumar Paul	Praja Socialist Party
Mayurbhanj	94	Baisinga	Prasanna Kumar Dash	Praja Socialist Party
Mayurbhanj	94	Baisinga (SC)	Panchanan Das	Praja Socialist Party
Mayurbhanj	95	Udala	Manmohan Tudu	Indian National Congress
Mayurbhanj	96	Karanjia	Lal Saheb Nalini Chandra Bhanj Deo	Ganatantra Parishad
Mayurbhanj	97	Jashipur	Mochiram Tiriya	Ganatantra Parishad
Mayurbhanj	98	Rairangpur	Haradeb Triya	Independent
Mayurbhanj	99	Bahalda	Sundar Mohan Hemrom	Independent
Mayurbhanj	100	Bangiriposi	Radhamohan Nayak	Ganatantra Parishad
Mayurbhanj	101	Baripada	Harihar Mohanty	Praja Socialist Party
Mayurbhanj	101	Baripada (ST)	Samai Majhi	Independent

== Govt Formation ==
Harekrushna Mahatab led Congress party emerged as the single largest party by winning 40% of the seats. On 29 May 1957, Shri Mahtab formed a minority govt. with the assurance of support from Jharkhand Party, Communist Party of India, and several Independent MLAs. In May 1959, for the first time in the state, A Coalition govt was formed when opposition led by Ganatantra Parishad joined in to give stable administration to the state. However, This ministry fell in 1961 over disagreement regarding the coalition in Congress party. For the first time in the state, President's rule was imposed & early elections were called.

== See also ==
- 1957 elections in India
- 1961 Orissa Legislative Assembly election
- 1952 Orissa Legislative Assembly election
- Orissa Legislative Assembly
- 2nd Orissa Legislative Assembly
