= 1961 Orissa Legislative Assembly election =

State election in India

- 2 to 8 June 1961

All 140 seats in the Orissa Legislative Assembly 71 seats needed for a majority
- Registered: 85,51,743 (▲7.11%)
- Turnout: 36.57% (▲2.43pp)
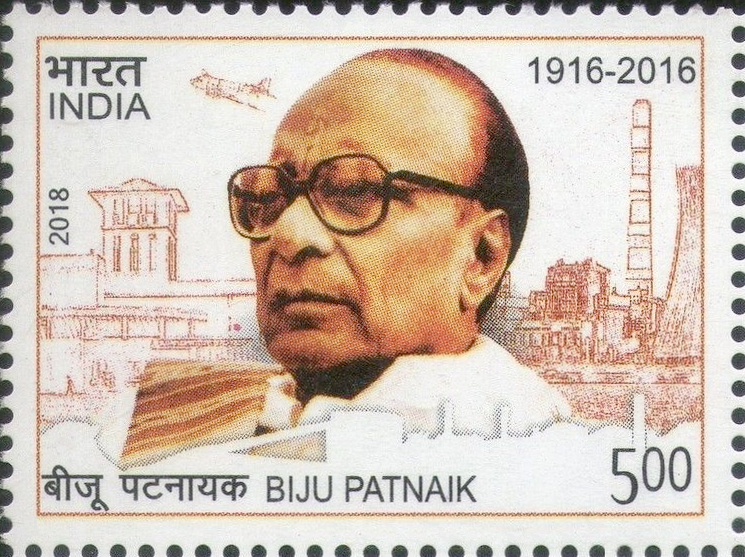
	Majority party	Minority party
		AIGP
Leader	Biju Patnaik
Party	INC	AIGP
Leader's seat	Choudwar	-
Seats won	82	37
Seat change	▲26	▼14
Popular vote	12,69,000	6,55,099
Percentage	43.28	28.74
Swing	▲5.02	▼1.51
Chief Minister before election
Vacant
President's rule
Elected Chief Minister
Biju Patnaik
INC

Elections to the Third Orissa Legislative Assembly were held 1961.

== Constituencies ==
The elections were held for 140 constituencies, of which 25 were reserved for Scheduled Castes, 29 for Scheduled Tribes and 86 unreserved.

== Contesting parties ==
There are three national parties (the Communist Party of India, Congress and the Praja Socialist Party), one state party (Ganatantra Parishad), one registered unrecognised party (Jharkhand Party) and some Independent Politicians. All took part in this assembly election. The Congress party won a clear majority for the first time in Orissa by winning 58% of the seats with a vote share of 43.28%. The 1961 election was the first decisive election which resulted non-coalition govt. in the state. The post of Chief Minister saw successive replacements during this period. Bijayananda Pattanaik became the Chief Minister of Orissa and remained in power till 1963, when he was called by the national high command for reforming the party. He was replaced by the Bengali Biren Mitra, and finally by Sadasiba Tripathy in 1965 when corruption charges were brought against Mitra.

== Results ==
Source: Election Commission of India
Party				Popular vote			Seats		
Color	Flag	Name	Symbol	Votes	%	±pp	Contested	Won	+/−
		Indian National Congress		1,269,000	43.28%	▲5.02	140	82	▲26
		Ganatantra Parishad		655,099	22.34%	▼6.40	121	37	▼14
		Praja Socialist Party		322,305	10.99%	▲0.59	43	10	▼1
		Communist Party of India		233,971	7.98%	▼0.42	35	4	▼5
		Jharkhand Party		25,602	0.87%	(new)	9	0	(new)
	-	Independents	-	426,302	14.54%	▲0.33	187	7	▼6
Total				-	-	-	-	140	-
Valid Votes				2,932,279	34.29				
Invalid Votes				194,966	-				
Total Votes polled / turnout				3,127,245	36.57				
Abstentation				5,424,498	-				
Total No. of Electors				8,551,743					

== Elected members ==
District	#	Constituency Name	Winner	Party
Koraput	1	Omerkote	Sadasiba Tripathy	Indian National Congress
Koraput	2	Dabugam	Jagannath Tripathy	Indian National Congress
Koraput	3	Nowrangpur (SC)	Harijan Miru	Indian National Congress
Koraput	4	Jeypore	Raghunath Patnaik	Indian National Congress
Koraput	5	Kotpad (SC)	Mahadev Bakria	Indian National Congress
Koraput	6	Malkangiri (ST)	Guru Nayak	Ganatantra Parishad
Koraput	7	Padwa	Ganeswar Mohapatra	Indian National Congress
Koraput	8	Koraput (ST)	Toyaka Sangana	Indian National Congress
Koraput	9	Pottangi (ST)	Musuri Santa Pangi	Indian National Congress
Koraput	10	Rayagada (ST)	Mandangi Kamaya	Indian National Congress
Koraput	11	Gunupur	Narasinga Patra	Indian National Congress
Koraput	12	Bissamcuttack (ST)	Biswanath Chowdhary	Ganatantra Parishad
Ganjam	13	Parlakimedi	Nalla Kurma Naikulu	Indian National Congress
Ganjam	14	R. Udaigiri (ST)	Ramachandra Bhoya	Indian National Congress
Ganjam	15	Digapahandi	Raghunath Mahapatra	Indian National Congress
Ganjam	16	Mohana (SC)	Biswanath Nayak	Indian National Congress
Ganjam	17	Berhampur	Sisir Kumar Narendra Deb	Independent
Ganjam	18	Patrapur (SC)	Trilochan Jani	Indian National Congress
Ganjam	19	Dura	P. Venkat Jagannath Rao	Indian National Congress
Ganjam	20	Chatrapur	Lakshman Mahapatra	Communist Party of India
Ganjam	21	Khallikote	Ramchandra Mardaraj Dev	Indian National Congress
Ganjam	22	Hinjili	Brundaban Nayak	Indian National Congress
Ganjam	23	Kodala West	Biswanath Das	Indian National Congress
Ganjam	24	Kodala East	Lingaraj Panigrahi	Indian National Congress
Ganjam	25	Bhanjanagar	Maguni Charan Pradhan	Indian National Congress
Ganjam	26	Jagannath Prasad (SC)	Udayanath Naik	Indian National Congress
Ganjam	27	Aska	Lokanath Mishra	Indian National Congress
Ganjam	28	Suruda	Arjun Naik	Indian National Congress
Phulbani	29	Balliguda (ST)	Podra Dubara	Ganatantra Parishad
Phulbani	30	G. Udayagiri (ST)	Sarangdhar Pradhan	Indian National Congress
Phulbani	31	Phulbani	Himansu Sekhar Padhi	Indian National Congress
Phulbani	32	Baudh (SC)	Anirudha Dipa	Ganatantra Parishad
Kalahandi	33	Madanpur-Rampur	Birakeshari Deo	Ganatantra Parishad
Kalahandi	34	Bhawanipatna (ST)	Anchal Majhi	Ganatantra Parishad
Kalahandi	35	Kasipur	Nabakumari Devi	Ganatantra Parishad
Kalahandi	36	Koksara (SC)	Dayanidhi Naik	Ganatantra Parishad
Kalahandi	37	Junagarh	Maheswar Naik	Ganatantra Parishad
Kalahandi	38	Dharamgarh (ST)	Mukunda Naik	Ganatantra Parishad
Kalahandi	39	Khariar	Anupa Singh Deo	Indian National Congress
Kalahandi	40	Nawpara (ST)	Ghasiram Majhi	Independent
Bolangir	41	Kantabanji	Rajendra Narayan Singh Deo	Ganatantra Parishad
Bolangir	42	Titilagarh (SC)	Achyutananda Mahananda	Ganatantra Parishad
Bolangir	43	Saintala	Ainthu Sahoo	Ganatantra Parishad
Bolangir	44	Patnagarh (ST)	Ramesh Chandra Singh Bhoi	Ganatantra Parishad
Bolangir	45	Loisingha	Ram Prasad Mishra	Ganatantra Parishad
Bolangir	46	Bolangir (ST)	Chandra Sekhar Singh Bhoi	Ganatantra Parishad
Bolangir	47	Tusra	Nandakishore Mishra	Ganatantra Parishad
Bolangir	48	Binka	Anantaram Nanda	Ganatantra Parishad
Bolangir	49	Sonepur (SC)	Daulata Ganda	Ganatantra Parishad
Sambalpur	50	Melchhamunda	Satchidananda Padhi	Indian National Congress
Sambalpur	51	Padampur (ST)	Bir Bikramaditya Singh Bariha	Indian National Congress
Sambalpur	52	Bargarh	Gananath Pradhan	Independent
Sambalpur	53	Bijepur (SC)	Mohan Nag	Indian National Congress
Sambalpur	54	Bhatli	Saraswati Pradhan	Indian National Congress
Sambalpur	55	Sambalpur	Banamali Babu	Indian National Congress
Sambalpur	56	Attabira (SC)	Dalaganjan Chhuria	Indian National Congress
Sambalpur	57	Katarbaga	Bishnu Prasad Mishra	Ganatantra Parishad
Sambalpur	58	Deogarh (ST)	Jayadev Thakur	Ganatantra Parishad
Sambalpur	59	Rairakhol	Bhanuganga Tribhuban Deb	Ganatantra Parishad
Sambalpur	60	Brajrajnagar	Prasanna Kumar Panda	Communist Party of India
Sambalpur	61	Jharsuguda (ST)	Binod Behari Singh Bariha	Indian National Congress
Sundergarh	62	Sundergarh	Harihar Patel	Ganatantra Parishad
Sundergarh	63	Talsara (ST)	Gangadhar Pradhan	Ganatantra Parishad
Sundergarh	64	Rajgangpur (ST)	Rangaballabh Amat	Indian National Congress
Sundergarh	65	Bisra (ST)	Premchand Bhagat	Ganatantra Parishad
Sundergarh	66	Bonai (ST)	Hemendra Prasad Mahapatra	Ganatantra Parishad
Keonjhar	67	Champua (ST)	Guru Charan Naik	Ganatantra Parishad
Keonjhar	68	Patna	Raj Ballabh Mishra	Ganatantra Parishad
Keonjhar	69	Keonjhar	Janardan Bhanj Deo	Ganatantra Parishad
Keonjhar	70	Telkoi (ST)	Govinda Chandra Munda	Ganatantra Parishad
Keonjhar	71	Ramachandrapur	Muralidhar Kuanr	Indian National Congress
Keonjhar	72	Anandapur (SC)	Makar Sethi	Indian National Congress
Dhenkanal	73	Pal-lahara	Pabitra Mohan Pradhan	Indian National Congress
Dhenkanal	74	Talcher	Pabitra Mohan Pradhan	Indian National Congress
Dhenkanal	75	Kamakhyanagar	Brundaban Tripathy	Ganatantra Parishad
Dhenkanal	76	Dhenkanal	Ratnaprava Devi	Ganatantra Parishad
Dhenkanal	77	Gondia	Kalia Dehuri	Ganatantra Parishad
Dhenkanal	78	Chhendipada (SC)	Pada Naik	Indian National Congress
Dhenkanal	79	Angul	Kumud Chandra Singh	Indian National Congress
Dhenkanal	80	Athmallik	Khetra Mohan Panigrahi	Ganatantra Parishad
Puri	81	Banpur	Raghunath Mishra	Ganatantra Parishad
Puri	82	Daspalla (SC)	Saheb Naik	Indian National Congress
Puri	83	Khandpara	Raja Saheb Harihar Singh Mardaraj Bhramarabara Roy	Indian National Congress
Puri	84	Nayagarh	Brundaban Chandra Singh	Indian National Congress
Puri	85	Ranpur	Ram Chandra Ram	Communist Party of India
Puri	86	Begunia	Gangadhar Paikray	Communist Party of India
Puri	87	Khurda	Banamali Patnaik	Indian National Congress
Puri	88	Bhubaneswar	Satyapriya Mohanty	Indian National Congress
Puri	89	Balipatna (SC)	Gopinath Bhoi	Indian National Congress
Puri	90	Brahmagiri	Gopabandhu Patra	Independent
Puri	91	Puri	Bhagban Pratihari	Indian National Congress
Puri	92	Satyabadi	Rajraj Deb	Ganatantra Parishad
Puri	93	Pipili	Ram Chandra Patnaik	Indian National Congress
Puri	94	Kakatpur	Upendra Mohanty	Indian National Congress
Puri	95	Nimapara (SC)	Gobinda Chandra Sethi	Indian National Congress
Cuttack	96	Banki	Gokulanand Praharaj	Praja Socialist Party
Cuttack	97	Baramba	Bidyadhar Naik	Indian National Congress
Cuttack	98	Athgarh	Achyutananda Dash	Independent
Cuttack	99	Cuttack City	Biren Mitra	Indian National Congress
Cuttack	100	Choudwar	Biju Pattnaik	Indian National Congress
Cuttack	101	Cuttack Sadar (SC)	Laxman Mallick	Indian National Congress
Cuttack	102	Jagatsinghpur	Priyanath Dey	Indian National Congress
Cuttack	103	Govindpur (SC)	Kanduri Charan Mallik	Praja Socialist Party
Cuttack	104	Mahanga	Surendranath Patnaik	Indian National Congress
Cuttack	105	Salepur (SC)	Baidhar Behera	Praja Socialist Party
Cuttack	106	Balikuda	Bipin Bihari Das	Indian National Congress
Cuttack	107	Ersama	Ratnamali Jema	Indian National Congress
Cuttack	108	Tirtol	Pratap Chandra Mohanty	Indian National Congress
Cuttack	109	Patkura	Lokanath Mishra	Indian National Congress
Cuttack	110	Rajnagar	Padma Charan Naik	Independent
Cuttack	111	Aul	Raja Sailendra Narayan Bhanja Deo	Indian National Congress
Cuttack	112	Kendrapara	Dhruba Charan Sahu	Praja Socialist Party
Cuttack	113	Pattamundei (SC)	Prahlad Mallik	Indian National Congress
Cuttack	114	Binjharpur	Chittaranjan Naik	Indian National Congress
Cuttack	115	Berchana	Dhananjoy Lenka	Indian National Congress
Cuttack	116	Dharmasala	Gadadhar Dutta	Indian National Congress
Cuttack	117	Sukinda (SC)	Baidhar Singh	Indian National Congress
Cuttack	118	Jajpur West	Madan Mohan Patnaik	Indian National Congress
Cuttack	119	Jajpur East (SC)	Santanu Kumar Das	Indian National Congress
Balasore	120	Dhamnagar	Muralidhar Jena	Indian National Congress
Balasore	121	Basudebpur	Nilamani Routray	Indian National Congress
Balasore	122	Chandbali (SC)	Bairagi Jena	Indian National Congress
Balasore	123	Bhadrak	Nityananda Mahapatra	Independent
Balasore	124	Soro	Karunakar Panigrahi	Indian National Congress
Balasore	125	Simulia (SC)	Bhagiratha Das	Indian National Congress
Balasore	126	Nilgiri	Rajendra Chandra Mardaraj Harichandan	Ganatantra Parishad
Balasore	127	Balasore	Bijoy Krushna De	Indian National Congress
Balasore	128	Basta	Maheswar Baug	Praja Socialist Party
Balasore	129	Bhograi	Pyarimohan Das	Praja Socialist Party
Balasore	130	Jaleswar	Prasanna Kumar Paul	Praja Socialist Party
Mayurbhanj	131	Kunta	Prasanna Kumar Dash	Praja Socialist Party
Mayurbhanj	132	Baisinga (SC)	Arjun Patra	Praja Socialist Party
Mayurbhanj	133	Udala (ST)	Manmohan Tudu	Indian National Congress
Mayurbhanj	134	Karanjia	Pravakar Behera	Indian National Congress
Mayurbhanj	135	Jashipur (ST)	Mochiram Tiriya	Indian National Congress
Mayurbhanj	136	Rairangpur (ST)	Chandra Mohan Singh	Indian National Congress
Mayurbhanj	137	Bahalda (ST)	Sonaram Soren	Indian National Congress
Mayurbhanj	138	Bangiriposi (ST)	Ishwar Chandra Nayak	Indian National Congress
Mayurbhanj	139	Baripada	Santosh Kumar Sahu	Indian National Congress
Mayurbhanj	140	Muruda (ST)	Sakila Soren	Praja Socialist Party
