= Rajendra Narayan Singh Deo ministry =

Government of Odisha (1967 – 1971)

- 12th Ministry of Orissa
- 1967 – 1971
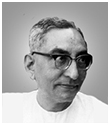
- Rajendra Narayan Singh Deo; Hon'ble Chief Minister of Orissa
- Date formed: 8 March 1967
- Date dissolved: 9 January 1971

People and organisations
- Governor: Ajudhiya Nath Khosla
- Chief Minister: Rajendra Narayan Singh Deo
- Deputy Chief Minister: Pabitra Mohan Pradhan
- No. of ministers: 19
- Member parties: Swatantra Party + Orissa Jana Congress
- Status in legislature: Majority
- Opposition party: Indian National Congress
- Opposition leader: Sadashiva Tripathy

History
- Incoming formation: 4th Orissa Legislative Assembly
- Outgoing formation: 3rd Orissa Legislative Assembly
- Election: 1967 Assembly election
- Legislature terms: 3 years, 307 days
- Predecessor: Sadashiva Tripathy ministry
- Successor: Second Bishwanath Das ministry

Rajendra Narayan Singh Deo was sworn in as the chief minister of Orissa following 1967 Assembly election.

== Brief history ==
After a hung assembly verdict in 1967 Assembly election, Swatantra Party and Orissa Jana Congress formed a post poll coalition with Rajendra Narayan Singh Deo as Chief Minister and Pabitra Mohan Pradhan as Deputy Chief Minister. Shri Rajendra Narayan Singh Deo along with 11 Cabinet ministers and 7 deputy minister were administered the oath of office and secrecy by Governor Ajudhiya Nath Khosla at the Raj Bhavan, Bhubaneswar on 8 March 1967.

Cabinet was further reshuffled on 6 September 1967, 31 August 1969 & 24 November 1969.

With rising difference among the coalition partners, Orissa Jana Congress left the Government on 9th January 1971 Subsequently, President's Rule was imposed and early election was called.

== Council of Ministers ==
Source
Portfolio	Portrait	Name Constituency	Tenure		Party
Chief Minister; Finance; Home (excluding Jail and Reformatories & Public Relations); Planning & Coordination; Other departments not allocated to any Minister.		Rajendra Narayan Singh Deo; MLA from Bolangir	8 March 1967	9 January 1971	SWA
Tourism		Rajendra Narayan Singh Deo; MLA from Bolangir	8 March 1967	6 September 1967	SWA
Tourism		Rajendra Narayan Singh Deo; MLA from Bolangir	31 August 1969	24 November 1969	SWA
Cabinet Minister
Deputy Chief Minister; Mines & Geology		Pabitra Mohan Pradhan; MLA from Pallahara	8 March 1967	7 January 1971	Jana Congress
Political and Services (excluding Administration of New Capital & River Valley Development)		Pabitra Mohan Pradhan; MLA from Pallahara	8 March 1967	6 September 1967	Jana Congress
Political and Services		Pabitra Mohan Pradhan; MLA from Pallahara	6 September 1967	24 November 1969	Jana Congress
Political and Services (excluding Administration of New Capital & River Valley Development)		Pabitra Mohan Pradhan; MLA from Pallahara	24 November 1969	7 January 1971	Jana Congress
Administration of New Capital & River Valley Development in Political and Services; Registration in Revenue		Santanu Kumar Das; MLA from Jajpur East	8 March 1967	6 September 1967	Jana Congress
Administration of New Capital & River Valley Development in Political and Services; Registration in Revenue		Santanu Kumar Das; MLA from Jajpur East	24 November 1969	7 January 1971	Jana Congress
Excise		Santanu Kumar Das; MLA from Jajpur East	8 March 1967	7 January 1971	Jana Congress
Tribal & Rural Welfare		Manmohan Tudu; MLA from Udala	8 March 1967	6 September 1967	Jana Congress
Tribal & Rural Welfare		Santanu Kumar Das; MLA from Jajpur East	6 September 1967	24 November 1969	Jana Congress
Tribal & Rural Welfare		Manmohan Tudu; MLA from Udala	24 November 1969	7 January 1971	Jana Congress
Irrigation & Power		Surendranath Patnaik; MLA from Salepur	8 March 1967	7 January 1971	Jana Congress
Revenue (excluding Registration)		Surendranath Patnaik; MLA from Salepur	8 March 1967	6 September 1967	Jana Congress
Revenue		Surendranath Patnaik; MLA from Salepur	6 September 1967	24 November 1969	Jana Congress
Revenue (excluding Registration)		Surendranath Patnaik; MLA from Salepur	24 November 1969	7 January 1971	Jana Congress
Agriculture (excluding Fisheries and Animal Husbandry); Labour, Employment & Housing		Raj Ballabh Mishra; MLA from Ramchandrapur	8 March 1967	9 January 1971	SWA
Fisheries & Animal Husbandry in Agriculture		Gangadhar Pradhan; MLA from Talsara	8 March 1967	6 September 1967	SWA
Fisheries & Animal Husbandry in Agriculture		Murari Prasad Misra; MLA from Jharsuguda	6 September 1967	31 August 1969	SWA
Fisheries & Animal Husbandry in Agriculture		Gangadhar Pradhan; MLA from Talsara	31 August 1969	9 January 1971	SWA
Jail and Reformatories in Home		Gangadhar Pradhan; MLA from Talsara	8 March 1967	6 September 1967	SWA
Jail and Reformatories in Home		Harihar Patel; MLA from Sundargarh	6 September 1967	9 January 1971	SWA
Industries; Public Relations in Homes; Text Book Press at Bhubaneswar in Education; Commerce		Harihar Patel; MLA from Sundargarh	8 March 1967	9 January 1971	SWA
Tourism		Harihar Patel; MLA from Sundargarh	6 September 1967	31 August 1969	SWA
Tourism		Harihar Patel; MLA from Sundargarh	24 November 1969	9 January 1971	SWA
Education (excluding Text Book Press at Bhubaneswar)		Banamali Patnaik; MLA from Pipili	8 March 1967	7 January 1971	JAC
Co-operation in Co-operation & Forestry		Murari Prasad Misra; MLA from Jharsuguda	8 March 1967	9 January 1971	SWA
Health		Murari Prasad Misra; MLA from Jharsuguda	8 March 1967	6 September 1967	SWA
Health		N. Ramseshaiah; MLA from Jeypore	6 September 1967	31 August 1969	SWA
Health		Murari Prasad Misra; MLA from Jharsuguda	31 August 1969	9 January 1971	SWA
Supply; Cultural Affairs		Nityananda Mahapatra; MLA from Bhadrak	8 March 1967	7 January 1971	Jana Congress
Works (except Public Health Engineering of Roads and Buildings Branch); Transport		Dayanidhi Naik; MLA from Bhawanipatna	8 March 1967	9 January 1971	SWA
Urban Development; Public Health Engineering of Roads and Buildings Branch in Works		Kartick Chandra Majhi; MLA from Rairangpur	8 March 1967	6 September 1967	SWA
Urban Development; Public Health Engineering of Roads and Buildings Branch in Works		Haraprasad Mahapatra; MLA from Soro	6 September 1967	31 August 1969	SWA
Urban Development; Public Health Engineering of Roads and Buildings Branch in Works		Kartick Chandra Majhi; MLA from Rairangpur	31 August 1969	9 January 1971	SWA
Law		Haraprasad Mahapatra; MLA from Soro	8 March 1967	9 January 1971	SWA
Forestry in Co-operation & Forestry		Haraprasad Mahapatra; MLA from Soro	8 March 1967	6 September 1967	SWA
Forestry in Co-operation & Forestry		Murari Prasad Misra; MLA from Jharsuguda	6 September 1967	31 August 1969	SWA
Forestry in Co-operation & Forestry		Haraprasad Mahapatra; MLA from Soro	31 August 1969	9 January 1971	SWA
Community Development & Panchayati Raj		Haraprasad Mahapatra; MLA from Soro	8 March 1967	6 September 1967	SWA
Community Development & Panchayati Raj		Raj Ballabh Mishra; MLA from Ramchandrapur	6 September 1967	9 January 1971	SWA
Deputy Minister
Revenue; Irrigation & Power		Himansu Sekhar Padhi; MLA from Baudh	8 March 1967	7 January 1971	Jana Congress
Community Development & Panchayati Raj		Ananta Narayan Singh Deo; MLA from Suruda	8 March 1967	9 January 1971	SWA
Industries; Commerce		Ananta Narayan Singh Deo; MLA from Suruda	8 March 1967	6 September 1967	SWA
Industries; Commerce		Ananta Narayan Singh Deo; MLA from Suruda	31 August 1969	9 January 1971	SWA
Planning & Coordination		Brundaban Tripathy; MLA from Kamakhyanagar	8 March 1967	9 January 1971	SWA
Co-operation in Co-operation & Forestry		Brundaban Tripathy; MLA from Kamakhyanagar	8 March 1967	6 September 1967	SWA
Co-operation in Co-operation & Forestry		Brundaban Tripathy; MLA from Kamakhyanagar	31 August 1969	9 January 1971	SWA
Agriculture		Brundaban Tripathy; MLA from Kamakhyanagar	8 March 1967	6 September 1967	SWA
Agriculture (excluding Fisheries and Animal Husbandry)		Brundaban Tripathy; MLA from Kamakhyanagar	6 September 1967	31 August 1969	SWA
Agriculture (excluding Fisheries and Animal Husbandry)		Govind Chandra Munda; MLA from Keonjhar	31 August 1969	9 January 1971	SWA
Co-operation in Co-operation & Forestry; Fisheries & Animal Husbandry in Agriculture		Gangadhar Pradhan; MLA from Talsara	6 September 1967	31 August 1969	SWA
Health		Govind Chandra Munda; MLA from Keonjhar	8 March 1967	31 August 1969	SWA
Labour, Employment & Housing		Govind Chandra Munda; MLA from Keonjhar	8 March 1967	6 September 1967	SWA
Labour, Employment & Housing		Govind Chandra Munda; MLA from Keonjhar	31 August 1969	9 January 1971	SWA
Jail and Reformatories in Home		Govind Chandra Munda; MLA from Keonjhar	6 September 1967	31 August 1969	SWA
Works (except Public Health Engineering of Roads and Buildings Branch); Transport		Damburu Majhi; MLA from Dabugam	8 March 1967	6 September 1967	SWA
Works (except Public Health Engineering of Roads and Buildings Branch); Transport		Damburu Majhi; MLA from Dabugam	31 August 1969	9 January 1971	SWA
Tribal & Rural Welfare		Manmohan Tudu; MLA from Udala	6 September 1967	31 August 1969	Jana Congress
Finance; Public Relations in Home		Kartick Chandra Majhi; MLA from Rairangpur	6 September 1967	31 August 1969	SWA

== Demographics ==
Division	District	Ministers	Cabinet Ministers	Deputy Ministers
Central	Cuttack	2	Santanu Kumar Das; Surendranath Patnaik	–
Central	Puri	1	Banamali Patnaik	–
Central	Balasore	2	Nityananda Mahapatra; Haraprasad Mahapatra	–
Central	Mayurbhanj	2	Manmohan Tudu; Kartick Chandra Majhi	–
Northern	Sambalpur	1	Murari Prasad Misra	–
Northern	Sundergarh	2	Gangadhar Pradhan; Harihar Patel	–
Northern	Keonjhar	2	Raj Ballabh Mishra	Govinda Chandra Munda
Northern	Dhenkanal	2	Pabitra Mohan Pradhan (Deputy CM)	Brundaban Tripathy
Northern	Balangir	1	Rajendra Narayan Singh Deo (Chief Minister)	–
Southern	Ganjam	1	–	Ananta Narayan Singh Deo
Southern	Kalahandi	1	Dayanidhi Naik	–
Southern	Koraput	1	–	Damburu Majhi
Southern	Phulbani	1	–	Himansu Sekhar Padhi
