= 4th Orissa Legislative Assembly =

4th state legislature of the Indian state of Orissa

←	3rd Assembly	5th Assembly	→
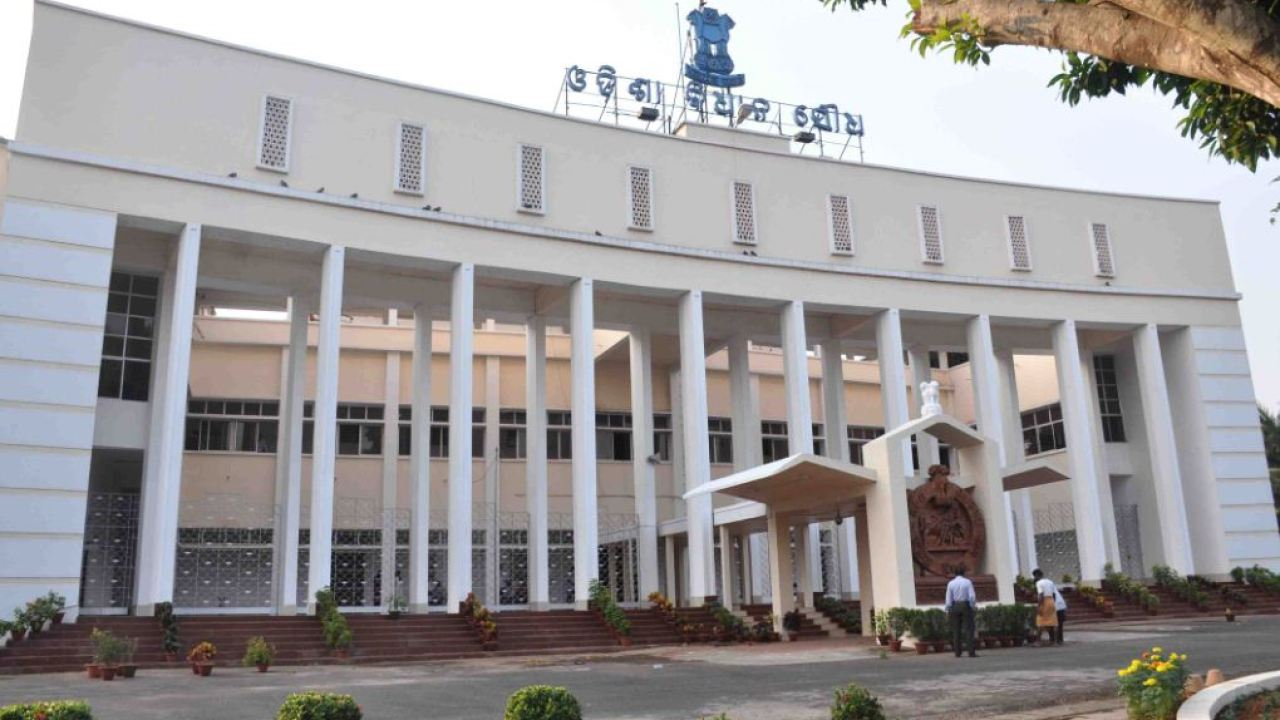
- Front view of Odisha Vidhan Saudha, Bhubaneshwar (2010)

Overview
- Meeting place: Odisha Vidhan Saudha, Bhubaneshwar, Odisha, India
- Term: 1 March 1967 – 23 January 1971
- Election: 1967 Orissa Legislative Assembly election
- Government: SWP + OJC
- Opposition: Indian National Congress
- Website: assembly.odisha.gov.in

Orissa Legislative Assembly
- House Composition
- Members: 140
- Governor: Ajudhia Nath Khosla; Shaukatullah Shah Ansari
- Speaker: Nandakishore Mishra, SWP
- Deputy Speaker: Harihar Bahinipati, PSP
- Leader of the House (Chief Minister): Rajendra Narayan Singh Deo, SWP
- Leader of Opposition: Sadashiva Tripathy, INC
- Party control: SWP + OJC (75/140)
- 10 Sessions with 197 sitting days

The Fourth Orissa Legislative Assembly was convened after the 1967 Orissa Legislative Assembly election.

== Brief History ==
Prior to election, All India Ganatantra Parishad merged with Swatantra Party and Harekrushna Mahatab left Congress to form Orissa Jana Congress. Both Swatantra and Jana Congress Party formed a post poll Coalition Government with Shri R. N. Singh Deo as the Chief Minister on 8 March 1967. Due to difference between the parties, the Coalition Government collapsed on the 9th January 1971. Subsequently, President's Rule was imposed and early election was called.

== House Composition ==
Party	Strength
Swatantra Party	49
Indian National Congress	31
Orissa Jana Congress	26
Praja Socialist Party	21
Communist Party of India	7
Samyukta Socialist Party	2
Communist Party of India (Marxist)	1
Independent	3

== Office Bearers ==
Post	Portrait	Name	Tenure		Party
Governor		Ajudhia Nath Khosla	Assembly Begins	30 January 1968	N/A
Governor		Shaukatullah Shah Ansari	31 January 1968	Assembly Dissolves	N/A
Speaker		Nandakishore Mishra; MLA from Loisingha	18 March 1967	11 January 1971	Swatantra Party
Deputy Speaker		Harihar Bahinipati; MLA from Puri	29 March 1967	11 January 1971	Praja Socialist Party
Leader of the House (Chief Minister)		Rajendra Narayan Singh Deo; MLA from Bolangir	8 March 1967	9 January 1971	Swatantra Party
Deputy Leader of the House (Deputy Chief Minister)		Pabitra Mohan Pradhan; MLA from Pallahara	8 March 1967	9 January 1971	Orissa Jana Congress
Leader of Opposition		Sadashiva Tripathy; MLA from Nowrangpur	18 March 1967	11 January 1971	Indian National Congress

== Council of Ministers ==
Source
Portfolio	Portrait	Name Constituency	Tenure		Party
Chief Minister; Finance; Home (excluding Jail and Reformatories & Public Relations); Planning & Coordination; Other departments not allocated to any Minister.		Rajendra Narayan Singh Deo; MLA from Bolangir	8 March 1967	9 January 1971	SWA
Tourism		Rajendra Narayan Singh Deo; MLA from Bolangir	8 March 1967	6 September 1967	SWA
Tourism		Rajendra Narayan Singh Deo; MLA from Bolangir	31 August 1969	24 November 1969	SWA
Cabinet Minister
Deputy Chief Minister; Mines & Geology		Pabitra Mohan Pradhan; MLA from Pallahara	8 March 1967	7 January 1971	Jana Congress
Political and Services (excluding Administration of New Capital & River Valley Development)		Pabitra Mohan Pradhan; MLA from Pallahara	8 March 1967	6 September 1967	Jana Congress
Political and Services		Pabitra Mohan Pradhan; MLA from Pallahara	6 September 1967	24 November 1969	Jana Congress
Political and Services (excluding Administration of New Capital & River Valley Development)		Pabitra Mohan Pradhan; MLA from Pallahara	24 November 1969	7 January 1971	Jana Congress
Administration of New Capital & River Valley Development in Political and Services; Registration in Revenue		Santanu Kumar Das; MLA from Jajpur East	8 March 1967	6 September 1967	Jana Congress
Administration of New Capital & River Valley Development in Political and Services; Registration in Revenue		Santanu Kumar Das; MLA from Jajpur East	24 November 1969	7 January 1971	Jana Congress
Excise		Santanu Kumar Das; MLA from Jajpur East	8 March 1967	7 January 1971	Jana Congress
Tribal & Rural Welfare		Manmohan Tudu; MLA from Udala	8 March 1967	6 September 1967	Jana Congress
Tribal & Rural Welfare		Santanu Kumar Das; MLA from Jajpur East	6 September 1967	24 November 1969	Jana Congress
Tribal & Rural Welfare		Manmohan Tudu; MLA from Udala	24 November 1969	7 January 1971	Jana Congress
Irrigation & Power		Surendranath Patnaik; MLA from Salepur	8 March 1967	7 January 1971	Jana Congress
Revenue (excluding Registration)		Surendranath Patnaik; MLA from Salepur	8 March 1967	6 September 1967	Jana Congress
Revenue		Surendranath Patnaik; MLA from Salepur	6 September 1967	24 November 1969	Jana Congress
Revenue (excluding Registration)		Surendranath Patnaik; MLA from Salepur	24 November 1969	7 January 1971	Jana Congress
Agriculture (excluding Fisheries and Animal Husbandry); Labour, Employment & Housing		Raj Ballabh Mishra; MLA from Ramchandrapur	8 March 1967	9 January 1971	SWA
Fisheries & Animal Husbandry in Agriculture		Gangadhar Pradhan; MLA from Talsara	8 March 1967	6 September 1967	SWA
Fisheries & Animal Husbandry in Agriculture		Murari Prasad Misra; MLA from Jharsuguda	6 September 1967	31 August 1969	SWA
Fisheries & Animal Husbandry in Agriculture		Gangadhar Pradhan; MLA from Talsara	31 August 1969	9 January 1971	SWA
Jail and Reformatories in Home		Gangadhar Pradhan; MLA from Talsara	8 March 1967	6 September 1967	SWA
Jail and Reformatories in Home		Harihar Patel; MLA from Sundargarh	6 September 1967	9 January 1971	SWA
Industries; Public Relations in Homes; Text Book Press at Bhubaneswar in Education; Commerce		Harihar Patel; MLA from Sundargarh	8 March 1967	9 January 1971	SWA
Tourism		Harihar Patel; MLA from Sundargarh	6 September 1967	31 August 1969	SWA
Tourism		Harihar Patel; MLA from Sundargarh	24 November 1969	9 January 1971	SWA
Education (excluding Text Book Press at Bhubaneswar)		Banamali Patnaik; MLA from Pipili	8 March 1967	7 January 1971	JAC
Co-operation in Co-operation & Forestry		Murari Prasad Misra; MLA from Jharsuguda	8 March 1967	9 January 1971	SWA
Health		Murari Prasad Misra; MLA from Jharsuguda	8 March 1967	6 September 1967	SWA
Health		N. Ramseshaiah; MLA from Jeypore	6 September 1967	31 August 1969	SWA
Health		Murari Prasad Misra; MLA from Jharsuguda	31 August 1969	9 January 1971	SWA
Supply; Cultural Affairs		Nityananda Mahapatra; MLA from Bhadrak	8 March 1967	7 January 1971	Jana Congress
Works (except Public Health Engineering of Roads and Buildings Branch); Transport		Dayanidhi Naik; MLA from Bhawanipatna	8 March 1967	9 January 1971	SWA
Urban Development; Public Health Engineering of Roads and Buildings Branch in Works		Kartick Chandra Majhi; MLA from Rairangpur	8 March 1967	6 September 1967	SWA
Urban Development; Public Health Engineering of Roads and Buildings Branch in Works		Haraprasad Mahapatra; MLA from Soro	6 September 1967	31 August 1969	SWA
Urban Development; Public Health Engineering of Roads and Buildings Branch in Works		Kartick Chandra Majhi; MLA from Rairangpur	31 August 1969	9 January 1971	SWA
Law		Haraprasad Mahapatra; MLA from Soro	8 March 1967	9 January 1971	SWA
Forestry in Co-operation & Forestry		Haraprasad Mahapatra; MLA from Soro	8 March 1967	6 September 1967	SWA
Forestry in Co-operation & Forestry		Murari Prasad Misra; MLA from Jharsuguda	6 September 1967	31 August 1969	SWA
Forestry in Co-operation & Forestry		Haraprasad Mahapatra; MLA from Soro	31 August 1969	9 January 1971	SWA
Community Development & Panchayati Raj		Haraprasad Mahapatra; MLA from Soro	8 March 1967	6 September 1967	SWA
Community Development & Panchayati Raj		Raj Ballabh Mishra; MLA from Ramchandrapur	6 September 1967	9 January 1971	SWA
Deputy Minister
Revenue; Irrigation & Power		Himansu Sekhar Padhi; MLA from Baudh	8 March 1967	7 January 1971	Jana Congress
Community Development & Panchayati Raj		Ananta Narayan Singh Deo; MLA from Suruda	8 March 1967	9 January 1971	SWA
Industries; Commerce		Ananta Narayan Singh Deo; MLA from Suruda	8 March 1967	6 September 1967	SWA
Industries; Commerce		Ananta Narayan Singh Deo; MLA from Suruda	31 August 1969	9 January 1971	SWA
Planning & Coordination		Brundaban Tripathy; MLA from Kamakhyanagar	8 March 1967	9 January 1971	SWA
Co-operation in Co-operation & Forestry		Brundaban Tripathy; MLA from Kamakhyanagar	8 March 1967	6 September 1967	SWA
Co-operation in Co-operation & Forestry		Brundaban Tripathy; MLA from Kamakhyanagar	31 August 1969	9 January 1971	SWA
Agriculture		Brundaban Tripathy; MLA from Kamakhyanagar	8 March 1967	6 September 1967	SWA
Agriculture (excluding Fisheries and Animal Husbandry)		Brundaban Tripathy; MLA from Kamakhyanagar	6 September 1967	31 August 1969	SWA
Agriculture (excluding Fisheries and Animal Husbandry)		Govind Chandra Munda; MLA from Keonjhar	31 August 1969	9 January 1971	SWA
Co-operation in Co-operation & Forestry; Fisheries & Animal Husbandry in Agriculture		Gangadhar Pradhan; MLA from Talsara	6 September 1967	31 August 1969	SWA
Health		Govind Chandra Munda; MLA from Keonjhar	8 March 1967	31 August 1969	SWA
Labour, Employment & Housing		Govind Chandra Munda; MLA from Keonjhar	8 March 1967	6 September 1967	SWA
Labour, Employment & Housing		Govind Chandra Munda; MLA from Keonjhar	31 August 1969	9 January 1971	SWA
Jail and Reformatories in Home		Govind Chandra Munda; MLA from Keonjhar	6 September 1967	31 August 1969	SWA
Works (except Public Health Engineering of Roads and Buildings Branch); Transport		Damburu Majhi; MLA from Dabugam	8 March 1967	6 September 1967	SWA
Works (except Public Health Engineering of Roads and Buildings Branch); Transport		Damburu Majhi; MLA from Dabugam	31 August 1969	9 January 1971	SWA
Tribal & Rural Welfare		Manmohan Tudu; MLA from Udala	6 September 1967	31 August 1969	Jana Congress
Finance; Public Relations in Home		Kartick Chandra Majhi; MLA from Rairangpur	6 September 1967	31 August 1969	SWA

== Members of Legislative Assembly ==
Source
District	#	Constituency Name	Name	Party	Remarks
Mayurbhanj	1	Karanjia (ST)	Prafulla Kumar Das	Swatantra Party	
Mayurbhanj	2	Jashipur (ST)	Durga Charan Nayak	Swatantra Party	
Mayurbhanj	3	Rairangpur (ST)	Kartik Chandra Majhi	Swatantra Party	
Mayurbhanj	4	Bahalda (ST)	Sonaram Soren	Orissa Jana Congress	
Mayurbhanj	5	Bangriposi (ST)	Radhamohan Nayak	Swatantra Party	
Mayurbhanj	6	Baripada	Santosh Kumar Sahu	Indian National Congress	
Mayurbhanj	7	Muruda (ST)	Sakila Soren	Praja Socialist Party	
Mayurbhanj	8	Baisinga (ST)	Prasanna Kumar Dash	Praja Socialist Party	
Mayurbhanj	9	Khunta	Harachand Hansada	Praja Socialist Party	
Mayurbhanj	10	Udala (ST)	Manmohan Tudu	Orissa Jana Congress	
Baleshwar	11	Bhograi	Pyarimohan Das	Praja Socialist Party	
Baleshwar	12	Jaleswar	Prasanna Kumar Paul	Praja Socialist Party	
Baleshwar	13	Basta	Chintamani Jena	Indian National Congress	
Baleshwar	14	Balasore	Rabindra Mohan Das	Praja Socialist Party	
Baleshwar	15	Nilgiri	Banamali Das	Communist Party of India (Marxist)	
Baleshwar	16	Sore	Haraprasad Mahapatra	Swatantra Party	
Baleshwar	17	Simulia (SC)	Uchhab Charan Jena	Praja Socialist Party	
Baleshwar	18	Bhadrak	Nityananda Mahapatra	Orissa Jana Congress	
Baleshwar	19	Dhamnagar	Satyabhama Dei	Orissa Jana Congress	
Baleshwar	20	Chandabali (SC)	Manmohan Das	Orissa Jana Congress	
Baleshwar	21	Basudebpur	Harekrushna Mahatab	Orissa Jana Congress	
Cuttack	22	Sukinda	Anandamanjari Debi	Orissa Jana Congress	
Cuttack	23	Dharmasala	Paramananda Mohanty	Praja Socialist Party	
Cuttack	24	Barchana	Jagannath Das	Praja Socialist Party	
Cuttack	25	Binjharpur	Baishnab Charan Mallick	Praja Socialist Party	
Cuttack	26	Jajpur (West)	Prafulla Chandra Ghadei	Orissa Jana Congress	
Cuttack	27	Jajpur (East) (SC)	Santanu Kumar Das	Orissa Jana Congress	
Cuttack	28	Aul	Dibakarnath Sharma	Indian National Congress	
Cuttack	29	Patamundai (SC)	Biswanath Mallick	Praja Socialist Party	
Cuttack	30	Rajanagar	Raja Sailendra Narayan Bhanja Deo	Independent	
Cuttack	31	Kendrapara	Sarojakanta Kanungo	Praja Socialist Party	
Cuttack	32	Patkura	Chakradhar Satpathy	Praja Socialist Party	
Cuttack	33	Tirtol	Nishamani Khuntia	Praja Socialist Party	
Cuttack	34	Ersama	Lokanath Choudhury	Communist Party of India	
Cuttack	35	Balikuda	Baikunthanath Mohanty	Praja Socialist Party	
Cuttack	36	Jagatsinghpur (SC)	Kanduri Charan Mallik	Praja Socialist Party	
Cuttack	37	Gobindpur	Muralidhar Kanungo	Orissa Jana Congress	
Cuttack	38	Salepur	Surendranath Patnaik	Orissa Jana Congress	
Cuttack	39	Mahanga	Biraja Prasad Ray	Praja Socialist Party	
Cuttack	40	Chaudwar	Akulananda Behera	Praja Socialist Party	
Cuttack	41	Cuttack City	Biren Mitra	Indian National Congress	
Cuttack	42	Cuttack Sadar (SC)	Sukadeva Jena	Orissa Jana Congress	
Cuttack	43	Banki	Jogesh Chandra Rout	Independent	
Cuttack	44	Athagarh	Pabitra Mohan Pradhan	Orissa Jana Congress	Resigned as elected in two seats.
Cuttack	44	Athagarh	Radhanath Rath	Independent	Elected in 1967 bypoll.
Cuttack	45	Baramba	Pratap Chandra Pattanaik	Orissa Jana Congress	
Puri	46	Bhubaneswar	Harekrushna Mahatab	Orissa Jana Congress	Resigned as elected in two seats.
Puri	46	Bhubaneswar	Subhadra Mahatab	Orissa Jana Congress	Elected in 1967 bypoll.
Puri	47	Balipatna (SC)	Harihar Bhoi	Orissa Jana Congress	
Puri	48	Pipili	Banamali Patnaik	Orissa Jana Congress	
Puri	49	Nimapara (SC)	Nilamani Sethy	Orissa Jana Congress	
Puri	50	Kakatapur	Gatikrushna Swain	Communist Party of India	
Puri	51	Satyabadi	Gangadhar Mohapatra	Indian National Congress	
Puri	52	Puri	Harihar Bahinipati	Praja Socialist Party	Deputy Speaker
Puri	53	Bramhagiri	Brajamohan Mohanty	Indian National Congress	
Puri	54	Banpur	Raghunath Mishra	Indian National Congress	
Puri	55	Khurda	Raja Birkishore Dev	Orissa Jana Congress	
Puri	56	Begunia	Gangadhar Paikaray	Communist Party of India	
Puri	57	Khandapara	Raja Saheb Harihar Singh Mardaraj Bhramarabara Roy	Indian National Congress	
Puri	58	Daspalla (SC)	Bhabagrahi Nayak	Swatantra Party	
Puri	59	Nayagarh	Achyutananda Mohanty	Independent	
Puri	60	Ranpur	Brajendra Chandra Bir. Baj. Narendra Mohapatra Singh Deo	Indian National Congress	
Ganjam	61	Jaganathprasad (SC)	Udayanath Naik	Indian National Congress	
Ganjam	62	Bhanjanagar	Dinabandhu Behera	Indian National Congress	
Ganjam	63	Suruda	Ananta Narayan Singh Deo	Swatantra Party	
Ganjam	64	Aska	Harihar Das	Communist Party of India	
Ganjam	65	Kabisuryanagar	Dandapani Swain	Communist Party of India	
Ganjam	66	Kodala	Banamali Maharana	Praja Socialist Party	
Ganjam	67	Khallikote	Narayan Sahu	Samyukta Socialist Party	
Ganjam	68	Chatrapur	Lakhmana Mahapatra	Communist Party of India	
Ganjam	69	Hinjili	Brundaban Nayak	Indian National Congress	
Ganjam	70	Dura (SC)	Mohan Nayak	Indian National Congress	
Ganjam	71	Berhampur	Binayak Acharya	Indian National Congress	
Ganjam	72	Chikati	Dibakar Patnaik	Indian National Congress	
Ganjam	73	Mohana (ST)	Tareni Sardar	Indian National Congress	
Ganjam	74	Ramagiri (ST)	Arjuna Singh	Indian National Congress	
Ganjam	75	Paralakhemundi	N. Naikulu Kurma	Indian National Congress	
Koraput	76	Gunupur (ST)	Bhagirathi Gomango	Indian National Congress	
Koraput	77	Bissam Cuttack (ST)	Biswanath Choudhury	Swatantra Party	
Koraput	78	Rayagada (ST)	Anantaram Majhi	Indian National Congress	
Koraput	79	Narayanpatna (ST)	Bidika Mallana	Swatantra Party	
Koraput	80	Nandapur (ST)	Malu Santha	Indian National Congress	
Koraput	81	Malkangiri (ST)	Gangadhar Madhi	Indian National Congress	
Koraput	82	Jeypore	N. Ramseshaiah	Swatantra Party	Died in 1969.
Koraput	82	Jeypore	Pratap Narayan Singh Deo	Swatantra Party	Elected in 1969 bypoll.
Koraput	83	Kotpad (ST)	Surjya Narayan Majhi	Indian National Congress	
Koraput	84	Nowrangpur	Sadasiba Tripathy	Indian National Congress	Leader of Opposition
Koraput	85	Kodinga (SC)	Jhitru Naik	Swatantra Party	
Koraput	86	Dabugam (ST)	Dombaru Majhi	Swatantra Party	
Koraput	87	Umarkote (ST)	Rabisingh Majhi	Indian National Congress	
Kalahandi	88	Nawapara (ST)	Onkar Singh	Indian National Congress	
Kalahandi	89	Khariar	Anupa Singh Deo	Indian National Congress	
Kalahandi	90	Dharmagarh (SC)	Lochan Dhangada Majhi	Swatantra Party	
Kalahandi	91	Koksara	Raghunath Praharaj	Swatantra Party	
Kalahandi	92	Junagarh	Maheswar Naik	Swatantra Party	
Kalahandi	93	Bhawanipatna (SC)	Dayanidhi Naik	Swatantra Party	
Kalahandi	94	Narla (ST)	Anchal Majhi	Swatantra Party	
Kalahandi	95	Kesinga	Bhagaban Bhoi	Swatantra Party	
Phulbani	96	Udayagiri (ST)	Gopal Pradhan	Swatantra Party	
Phulbani	97	Balliguda (ST)	Naresh Pradhan	Swatantra Party	
Phulbani	98	Phulbani (ST)	Barada Prasanna Kanhar	Swatantra Party	
Phulbani	99	Baudh	Himanshu Sekhar Padhi	Orissa Jana Congress	
Balangir	100	Sonepur	Nilambar Raiguru	Swatantra Party	
Balangir	101	Binka	Narasingh Charan Misra	Swatantra Party	
Balangir	102	Tusra	Radhamohan Mishra	Swatantra Party	
Balangir	103	Bolangir	Rajendra Narayan Singh Deo	Swatantra Party	Chief Minister
Balangir	104	Loisinga	Nandakishore Misra	Swatantra Party	Speaker
Balangir	105	Patnagarh	Ainthu Sahoo	Swatantra Party	
Balangir	106	Saintala	Ramesh Chandra Singh Bhoi	Swatantra Party	
Balangir	107	Titilagarh (SC)	Achyutananda Mahananda	Swatantra Party	
Balangir	108	Kantabanji (SC)	Lokanath Rai	Swatantra Party	
Sambalpur	109	Padampur	Bir Bikramaditya Singh Bariha	Orissa Jana Congress	
Sambalpur	110	Melchhamunda	Birendra Kumar Sahoo	Swatantra Party	
Sambalpur	111	Bijepur (SC)	Mohan Nag	Indian National Congress	
Sambalpur	112	Bhatli	Saraswati Pradhan	Indian National Congress	
Sambalpur	113	Bargarh	Bharat Chandra Hota	Indian National Congress	
Sambalpur	114	Sambalpur	Banamali Babu	Indian National Congress	
Sambalpur	115	Brajarajnagar	Prasanna Kumar Panda	Communist Party of India	
Sambalpur	116	Jharsuguda	Murari Prasad Misra	Swatantra Party	
Sambalpur	117	Laikera (ST)	Lal Rajendra Singh	Swatantra Party	
Sambalpur	118	Kuchinda (ST)	Kanhai Singh	Swatantra Party	
Sambalpur	119	Rairakhol (SC)	Bhikhari Suna	Swatantra Party	
Sambalpur	120	Deogarh	Bhanuganga Tribhuban Deb	Swatantra Party	
Sundargarh	121	Sundargarh	Harihar Patel	Swatantra Party	
Sundargarh	122	Talsara (ST)	Gangadhar Pradhan	Swatantra Party	
Sundargarh	123	Rajgangpur (ST)	Premchand Bhagat	Swatantra Party	
Sundargarh	124	Bisra (ST)	Krushna Chandra Naik	Swatantra Party	
Sundargarh	125	Rourkela	Rajkishore Samantarai	Praja Socialist Party	
Sundargarh	126	Bonai (ST)	Hemendra Prasad Mahapatra	Swatantra Party	
Keonjhar	127	Champua (ST)	Kshetra Mohan Nayak	Swatantra Party	
Keonjhar	128	Patna (ST)	Ramaray Munda	Swatantra Party	
Keonjhar	129	Keonjhar (ST)	Govinda Chandra Munda	Swatantra Party	
Keonjhar	130	Telkoi (ST)	Bhagirathi Mohapatra	Swatantra Party	
Keonjhar	131	Ramachandrapur	Raj Ballabh Mishra	Swatantra Party	
Keonjhar	132	Anandpur (SC)	Bhubanananda Jena	Orissa Jana Congress	
Dhenkanal	133	Pallahara	Pabitra Mohan Pradhan	Orissa Jana Congress	Deputy Chief Minister
Dhenkanal	134	Kamakhyanagar	Brundaban Tripathy	Swatantra Party	
Dhenkanal	135	Gondia	Haldhar Mishra	Swatantra Party	
Dhenkanal	136	Dhenkanal	Ratnaprava Devi	Swatantra Party	
Dhenkanal	137	Talcher (SC)	Kumar Chandra Behera	Orissa Jana Congress	
Dhenkanal	138	Chhendipada (SC)	Nabaghan Nayak	Orissa Jana Congress	
Dhenkanal	139	Angul	Kumud Chandra Singh	Orissa Jana Congress	
Dhenkanal	140	Athamallik	Surendra Pradhan	Samyukta Socialist Party	

== Bypolls ==
Source
Year	Constituency	Reason for by-poll	Winning candidate	Party
May 1967	Athagarh	Resignation of Pabitra Mohan Pradhan	Radhanath Rath	Independent
May 1967	Bhubaneswar	Resignation of Harekrushna Mahatab	Subhadra Mahatab	Orissa Jana Congress
December 1969	Jeypore	Death of N. Ramseshaiah	Pratap Narayan Singh Deo	Swatantra Party
