= Lakshmana Mahapatro =

Indian politician

Member of Parliament, Rajya Sabha
- In office 1974–1980
- Constituency: Odisha

Personal details
- Born: 7 June 1923
- Died: August 1983 (aged 60) Orissa, India
- Party: Communist Party of India
- Spouse: Ratnamani Mahapatro

Lakshmana Mahapatro (7 June 1923 – August 1983) was an Indian politician. He was a Member of Parliament, representing Odisha in the Rajya Sabha the upper house of India's Parliament as a member of the Communist Party of India.

Mahapatro was murdered in Orissa in August 1983, at the age of 60.
