= Kasipur Assembly constituency =

Former constituency of the Odisha Legislative Assembly

Kasipur
- Former constituency for the Odisha Legislative Assembly

Constituency details
- Country: India
- Region: East India
- State: Odisha
- District: Kalahandi
- Lok Sabha constituency: Kalahandi
- Established: 1952
- Abolished: 1966
- Reservation: None

Kasipur was an Assembly constituency from Kalahandi district of Odisha. It was established in 1952 and abolished in 1966.

== Members of the Legislative Assembly ==
Between 1952 & 1966, 3 elections were held. It was reserved for ST in 1952 & a 2-member constituency in 1957.

List of members elected from Kasipur constituency are:

Year	Member	Party
As Jaipatna Kasipur (ST) constituency
1952	Jhajuru Jhodia	Indian National Congress
As Kasipur constituency
1957	Kishore Chandra Deo (Note: Representing Kasipur)	All India Ganatantra Parishad
1957	Manikrai Naik (Note: Representing Kasipur (SC))	All India Ganatantra Parishad
1961	Nabakumari Devi	All India Ganatantra Parishad
