= Kanaklata Devi =

Indian politician (1909–1986)

Member of the Odisha Legislative Assembly
- In office 4 April 1957 – 25 February 1961
- Succeeded by: Bidyadhar Nayak
- Constituency: Baramba Assembly constituency

Personal details
- Born: 30 September 1909
- Died: 14 February 1986 (aged 76)
- Party: All India Ganatantra Parishad
- Occupation: Politician
- Nickname: Rani Saheba

Kanaklata Devi (30 September 1909 – 14 February 1986) also known as Rani Saheba was an Indian politician from Odisha. She served as the Member of the Odisha Legislative Assembly representing the Baramba Assembly Constituency as a member of the All India Ganatantra Parishad. She won in the 1957 Odisha Legislative Assembly elections and served as a member since 4 April 1957 to 25 February 1961.
