= Banka Behary Das =

Indian politician (1923–2001)

Member of Parliament, Rajya Sabha
- In office 1966-1971
- Constituency: Odisha

Personal details
- Born: January 1923
- Died: 2001
- Party: Praja Socialist Party
- Spouse: Sudhamanjari Das

Banka Behary Das (1923-2001) was an Indian politician, a Member of Parliament, representing Odisha in the Rajya Sabha the upper house of India's Parliament as a member of the Praja Socialist Party.
