= Harihar Patel =

Indian politician (1924–1991)

Member of Parliament, Rajya Sabha
- In office 1958–1961
- Constituency: Odisha

Personal details
- Born: 20 September 1924
- Died: 1991 (aged 66–67)
- Party: Ganatantra Parishad
- Spouse: Khiroda Kumari Patel

Harihar Patel (20 September 1924 – 1991) was an Indian politician. He was a Member of Parliament, representing Odisha in the Rajya Sabha, the upper house of India's Parliament as a member of the Ganatantra Parishad. Patel died in 1991.
