= Padmacharan Samantasinhar =

Indian politician (born 1917)

Member of Parliament, Lok Sabha
- In office 1977–1980
- Preceded by: Banamali Patnaik
- Succeeded by: Brajmohan Mohanty
- Constituency: Puri, Odisha

Personal details
- Born: December 1917 (age 108)
- Party: Janata Party
- Other political affiliations: Indian National Congress

Padmacharan Samantasinhar (born December 1917) is an Indian politician. He was elected to the Lok Sabha, the lower house of the Parliament of India as a member of the Janata Party.
