= Katarbaga Assembly constituency =

Former constituency of the Odisha Legislative Assembly

Katarbaga
- Former constituency for the Odisha Legislative Assembly

Constituency details
- Country: India
- Region: East India
- State: Odisha
- District: Sambalpur
- Lok Sabha constituency: Sambalpur
- Established: 1957
- Abolished: 1966
- Reservation: None

Katarbaga was an Assembly constituency from Sambalpur district of Odisha. It was established in 1956 and abolished in 1966. Following 1966 delimitation, it was merged with Jharsuguda.

== Members of the Legislative Assembly ==
Between 1957 & 1966, 2 elections were held.

List of members elected from Katarbaga constituency are:

Year	Member	Party
1957	Purusottam Panda	All India Ganatantra Parishad
1961	Bishnu Prasad Mishra	All India Ganatantra Parishad
