= Lokenath Mishra =

Indian politician (1905–1975)

Member of Parliament, Lok Sabha
- In office 1952–1957
- Succeeded by: Chintamani Panigrahi
- Constituency: Puri, Odisha

Personal details
- Born: 4 April 1905 Puri, Odisha, British India
- Died: 1975
- Party: Indian National Congress
- Spouse: Parbati Devi

Lokenath Mishra (1905-1975) was an Indian politician. He was elected to the Lok Sabha, the lower house of the Parliament of India as a member of the Indian National Congress. He was earlier a member of the Constituent Assembly of India from Odisha.
