= Nabakumari Devi =

Indian politician

Member of the Odisha Legislative Assembly
- In office 1961-1967
- Constituency: Kashipur

Personal details
- Party: Indian National Congress

Nabakumari Devi is an Indian politician. She was elected to the Odisha Legislative Assembly as a member of the Indian National Congress.
