= Tusra Assembly constituency =

Former constituency of the Odisha Legislative Assembly

Tusra
- Former constituency for the Odisha Legislative Assembly

Constituency details
- Country: India
- Region: East India
- State: Odisha
- District: Bolangir
- Lok Sabha constituency: Bolangir
- Established: 1961
- Abolished: 1973
- Reservation: None

Tusra was an Assembly constituency from Bolangir district of Odisha. It was established in 1961 and abolished in 1973.

== Members of the Legislative Assembly ==
Between 1961 & 1973, 3 elections were held.

List of members elected from Tusra constituency are:

Year	Member	Party
1961	Nandakishore Mishra	All India Ganatantra Parishad
1967	Radhamohan Mishra	Swatantra Party
1971	Radhamohan Mishra	Swatantra Party
