= Maheswar Baug =

Indian politician

Maheswar Baug was an Indian politician who was the MLA of Basta in Balasore district from 1962 to 1967 as a candidate of Praja Socialist Party (PSP). He was elected again from the seat later in 1974 on a Janata Party ticket. He served as minister for works and health in 1977.
