= Ratnamali Jema =

Indian politician

Member of the Odisha Legislative Assembly
- In office 1961-1966
- Constituency: Ersama (Vidhan Sabha constituency)

Personal details
- Born: 1915-1916
- Died: 2014
- Party: Indian National Congress

Ratnamali Jema was an Indian politician. She was elected to the Odisha Legislative Assembly as a member of the Indian National Congress.
