= Govind Chandra Munda =

Indian politician

Govind Chandra Munda is a politician from Odisha, India. He represented Keonjhar (Lok Sabha constituency) during the 9th and 10th Lok Sabha. He represented as a Janata Dal candidate.
