= Muralidhar Jena =

Indian politician

Member of Parliament, Lok Sabha
- In office 1996–1998
- Preceded by: Arjun Charan Sethi
- Succeeded by: Arjun Charan Sethi
- Constituency: Bhadrak, Odisha

Personal details
- Born: 6 January 1949 (age 77) Kat Sahi, Bhadrak District, Odisha
- Party: Indian National Congress
- Spouse: Shanti Lata Jena
- Children: Three sons and two daughters

Muralidhar Jena is an Indian politician. He was elected to the Lok Sabha, the lower house of the Parliament of India from Bhadrak in Odisha as a member of the Indian National Congress.
