= Bira Kesari Deo =

Indian politician

Bira Kesari Deo. (22 may 1927 – 3 September 2012) Born at Bhawanipatna, in Kalahandi District of Odisha in May 1927, Shri Deo had his education at Ravenshaw College, Cuttack. An agriculturist, Shri Bira Kesari Deo was actively associated with several social welfare activities, specially relating to the tribal people. He served as Chairman of the Bhawanipatna Municipality and was instrumental in establishing a Science College at Bhawanipatna, now known as Government Autonomous College. Shri Deo was a sports enthusiast and introduced the Kalahandi Cup for Cricket Tournament and Sura Tarangini Football Tournament, which are well known in Kalahandi district and Odisha. Shri Deo started his legislative career as a Member of the Odisha Legislative Assembly (MLA)in 1957 and served in that capacity from 1957 to 1967.

Later he represented State of Orissa in Rajya Sabha as MP during 1967–1970 and 1970–1976. Shri Bira Kesari Deo represented the State of Odisha in this House for two terms from April, 1967 to April, 1970 and again from April, 1970 to April, 1976. He was from Bhawanipatna, Kalahandi.
