= Banamali Babu =

Indian politician (1918–1998)

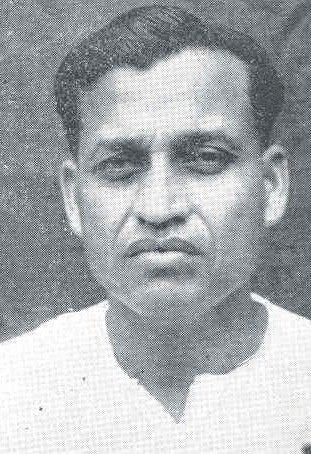
- Banamali Babu, Politician from Odisha

Member of Parliament, Lok Sabha
- In office 1971–1977
- Preceded by: Shraddhakar Supakar
- Succeeded by: Gananath Pradhan
- Constituency: Sambalpur, Odisha

Member of Parliament, Rajya Sabha
- In office 1982–1988
- Constituency: Odisha

Personal details
- Born: 9 March 1918 Sambalpur District, Orissa, British India
- Died: 30 November 1998 (aged 80)
- Party: Indian National Congress
- Spouse: Soroj Kumari Dev

Banamali Babu (9 March 1918 - 30 November 1998) was an Indian politician, belonging to the Indian National Congress. He was elected to the 5th Lok Sabha the lower house of Indian Parliament from Sambalpur in Odisha.
