= T. Sanganna =

Indian politician

Member of Parliament, Lok Sabha
- In office 1957-1962
- Succeeded by: Ramachandra Ulaka
- Constituency: Koraput, Odisha
- In office 1952-1957
- Succeeded by: Bijaya Chandra Pradhan
- Constituency: Rayagada-Phulbani, Odisha

Personal details
- Party: Indian National Congress
- Other party: Nikhil Utkal Adibasi Congress
- Spouse: Sudha

Toyaka Sanganna was an Indian politician, tribal welfare activist and writer from Odisha. He was elected to the Lok Sabha, lower house of the Parliament of India as a member of the Indian National Congress in the first and second terms of the Lok Sabha. As member of Parliament he served on the Scheduled Areas and Scheduled Tribes Commission(1960–61) along with Verrier Elwin, Subodh Chandra Hansdah.

Toyaka explicitly claimed that the Odia speaking tribals in the border areas adjoining to Andhra Pradesh- Odisha should be reorganised into the Odisha State for the greater good of the tribal populations and their development.

He also served as a Minister of Tribal and Rural Welfare in the Government of Odisha between 1963 to 1965

He was a strong advocate for the abolition of the Goti system of debt bonded labour and slavery which was practiced in the Koraput region. In this system individuals from tribal communities were forced to work to repay debts. This exploitative practice was a significant socio-economic issue in the region hindering the growth of human development in tribal inhabited regions of South Odisha.

During his tenure in office as Member of Parliament and also later as Minister in the Odisha Government he wrote columns and articles in the Adivasi a journal published by the Scheduled Castes and Scheduled Tribes Research and Training Institute, Bhubaneswar, Odisha.

The following submissions authored by Sanganna and published in the Adivasi are as follows:-

- The Challenge of Diversity. Toyaka Sangana. Vol. VI, No. 1, 1964–65, pp. 13–14
- Problems of Defintion . Toyaka Sangana. Vol. VI, No. 2, 1964–65, pp. 15–18
- Tribal Culture and its Preservation and Scientific Development. Toyaka Sangana. Vol. V, No. 3, 1963–64, pp. 3–4
- Tribal Problems of Orissa. T. Sanganna. Vol. VIII, No. 2, 1966–67, pp. 2–8
