= Saraswati Pradhan =

Indian politician (1925–2023)

MP of Rajya Sabha for Odisha
- In office 1972–1978
- Constituency: Odisha

Member of Odisha Legislative Assembly
- In office 1961–1971
- Preceded by: Natabar Banchhor
- Succeeded by: Natabar Banchhor
- Constituency: Bhatli

Personal details
- Born: 30 May 1925
- Died: 1 November 2023 (aged 98) Bhubaneswar, Odisha, India
- Party: Indian National Congress
- Spouse: Duriyodhan Pradhan
- Children: 2 Sons and 2 daughters

Saraswati Pradhan (30 May 1925 – 1 November 2023) was an Indian politician. She was elected to the Rajya Sabha the Upper house of Indian Parliament from Odisha as a member of the Indian National Congress. As of January 2018, Pradhan resided in Bhubaneswar.

Saraswati Pradhan died on 1 November 2023, at the age of 98.
