= Santosh Kumar Sahu =

Indian politician

Member: Rajya Sabha
- In office 1976–1994
- Constituency: Odisha

Personal details
- Born: 15 December 1935
- Party: Indian National Congress
- Spouse: Basanti Kumari Sahu
- Children: 3 son and 1 daughter

Santosh Kumar Sahu was an Indian Politician belonging to the Indian National Congress party. He was a Member of the Parliament of India representing Orissa in the Rajya Sabha, the upper house of the Indian Parliament for 3 terms elected in 1976, 1982 and 1988.He was earlier a member of the Odisha Legislative Assembly elected in 1961 and 1967 from Baripada.
