= Dura Assembly constituency =

Former constituency of the Odisha Legislative Assembly

Dura
- Former constituency for the Odisha Legislative Assembly

Constituency details
- Country: India
- Region: East India
- State: Odisha
- District: Ganjam
- Lok Sabha constituency: Berhampur
- Established: 1957
- Abolished: 1973
- Reservation: SC

Dura was an Assembly constituency from Ganjam district of Odisha. It was established in 1957 and abolished in 1973. From 1967, It was reserved for SC.

== Extent of constituency ==
- Mantridi, Golantra and Dura firkas in Berhampur taluk in Bernampur sub-division
- Tanganapalli firka in Chatrapur taluk in Chatrapur sub-division.

== Members of the Legislative Assembly ==
Between 1957 & 1971, 4 elections were held.

List of members elected from Dura constituency are:

Year	Member	Party
1957	P. Venkat Jagannath Rao	Indian National Congress
1961	P. Venkat Jagannath Rao	Indian National Congress
1967	Mohan Nayak	Indian National Congress
1971	Mohan Nayak	Indian National Congress (R)
