= Nilamani Routray =

Indian politician (1920–2004)

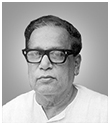

Minister of Environment and Forests
- In office 2 December 1989 – 10 November 1990
- Prime Minister: V. P. Singh
- Preceded by: V. P. Singh
- Succeeded by: Maneka Gandhi

10th Chief Minister of Odisha
- In office 26 June 1977 – 17 February 1980
- Preceded by: Binayak Acharya
- Succeeded by: Janaki Ballabh Patnaik

Member of parliament, Lok Sabha
- In office 30 November 1989 – 19 June 1991
- Preceded by: Brajmohan Mohanty
- Succeeded by: Braja Kishore Tripathy
- Constituency: Puri

Personal details
- Born: 24 May 1920 Mukundapur, Bihar and Orissa Province, British India
- Died: 4 October 2004 (aged 84) Cuttack, Odisha, India
- Party: Janata Dal
- Other political affiliations: Indian National Congress, Utkal Congress, Bharatiya Lok Dal, Janata Party
- Spouse: Nalini Devi Routray
- Children: Bijayshree Routray
- Parent: Chandra Sekhar Routray (father)
- Education: B.A., LL.B.
- Alma mater: Ravenshaw College, Vidyasagar College, Banaras Hindu University
- Occupation: Political and Social Worker, Writer, Journalist, Lawyer
- Awards: Odisha Sahitya Academy 1986

Nilamani Routray (24 May 1920 – 4 October 2004) was an Indian politician and the Chief Minister of Odisha from 1977 to 1980. He served as the Health and Family Welfare Minister and then Forest and Environment Minister in the Union Government led by V.P. Singh. He died on 4 October 2004.

== Political career ==
Nilamani Routray was a founder of the Odisha unit of All India Students Federation. He was the president of the Odisha state unit of the Indian National Congress from 1967 to 1970. Later he joined the Utkal Congress and became its president. Subsequent merger of Utkal Congress with Bharatiya Lok Dal, he became the president of its state unit of the merged entity. He was elected to the Lok Sabha in 1989.

== Works ==
His autobiography Smruti O Anubhuti (1986) won the Odisha Sahitya Akademi Award in 1988.

Preceded by Binayak Acharya	Chief Minister of Odisha; 26 June 1977 – 17 February 1980	Succeeded by Janaki Ballabh Patnaik
