= Second Hemananda Biswal ministry =

Government of Orissa (1999 – 2000)

- 24th Ministry of Orissa
- 1999 – 2000
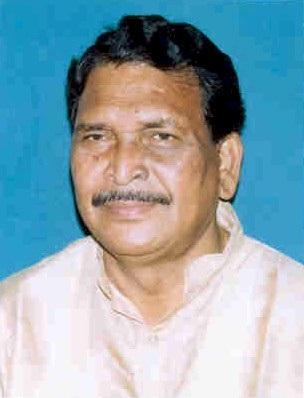
- Hemananda Biswal; Hon'ble Chief Minister of Orissa
- Date formed: 6 December 1999
- Date dissolved: 5 March 2000

People and organisations
- Governor: M. M. Rajendran
- Chief Minister: Hemananda Biswal
- No. of ministers: 31
- Member parties: Indian National Congress
- Status in legislature: Majority
- Opposition party: Biju Janata Dal
- Opposition leader: Satchidananda Dalal

History
- Incoming formation: 11th Orissa Legislative Assembly
- Election: 1995 Assembly election
- Legislature term: 90 days
- Predecessor: Giridhar Gamang ministry
- Successor: First Naveen Patnaik ministry

Hemananda Biswal was elected as the chief minister of Orissa for the second time in 1999 after Giridhar Gamang resigned as chief minister following mounting criticism of his handling of rescue and rehabilitation of the 1999 super cyclone.

== Brief history ==
Chief Minister Hemananda Biswal along with 2 Cabinet Ministers were administered the oath of office and secrecy by Governor M. M. Rajendran at the Raj Bhavan, Bhubaneswar on 6 December 1999. On 9 December 1999, 11 Cabinet Ministers, 8 Ministers of State (Independent Charge) and 8 Ministers of State were sworn into Council of Ministers. Shri Biswal resigned on 5 March 2000 following Cong's defeat in 2000 Orissa Assembly election.

== Council of Ministers ==
Source
Portfolio	Portrait	Name Constituency	Tenure		Party
Chief Minister; Home; General Administration; Steel & Mines; Science & Technology; Other departments not allocated to any Minister.		Hemananda Biswal; MLA from Laikera	6 December 1999	5 March 2000	INC
Panchayati Raj; Law		Hemananda Biswal; MLA from Laikera	7 February 2000	5 March 2000	INC
Cabinet Minister
Water Resources; Agriculture; Co-operation; Parliamentary Affairs		Basanta Kumar Biswal; MLA from Tirtol	6 December 1999	5 March 2000	INC
Revenue; Youth Services		Jagannath Patnaik; MLA from Nawapara	6 December 1999	5 March 2000	INC
Rural Development; Planning & Coordination		Kahnu Charan Lenka; MLA from Choudwar	9 December 1999	5 March 2000	INC
Health & Family Welfare		Kishore Chandra Patel; MLA from Sundargarh	9 December 1999	5 March 2000	INC
Schedule Tribes & Schedule Castes Development; Minorities & Backward Classes Welfare		Gajadhar Majhi; MLA from Talsara	9 December 1999	5 March 2000	INC
Labour & Employment; Public Enterprises		Durga Shankar Pattanayak; MLA from Sambalpur	9 December 1999	5 March 2000	INC
Forest; Environment		Netrananda Mallick; MLA from Chandbali	9 December 1999	5 March 2000	INC
Energy		Niranjan Patnaik; MLA from Ramchandrapur	9 December 1999	5 March 2000	INC
Finance		Bhagabat Prasad Mohanty; MLA from Kendrapara	9 December 1999	5 March 2000	INC
Urban Development; Information & Public Relations		Bhupinder Singh; MLA from Kesinga	9 December 1999	5 March 2000	INC
Higher Education; Public Grievances & Pension Administration		Sk. Matlub Ali; MLA from Mahanga	9 December 1999	5 March 2000	INC
Panchayati Raj; Law		Raghunath Patnaik; MLA from Jeypore	9 December 1999	7 February 2000	INC
Women & Child Development		Saraswati Hembram; MLA from Khunta	9 December 1999	5 March 2000	INC
Minister of State with Independent Charges
Industries		Amarnath Pradhan; MLA from Athmallik	9 December 1999	5 March 2000	INC
School & Mass Education		Nabin Chandra Narayan Das; MLA from Dhenkanal	9 December 1999	5 March 2000	INC
Commerce and Transport		Prakash Chandra Debata; MLA from Melchhamunda	9 December 1999	5 March 2000	INC
Works; Housing		Jayadev Jena; MLA from Anandapur	9 December 1999	5 March 2000	INC
Textiles & Handlooms		Bijayalaxmi Sahoo; MLA from Cuttack Sadar	9 December 1999	5 March 2000	INC
Food Supplies & Consumer Welfare		Mohan Nag; MLA from Bhatli	9 December 1999	5 March 2000	INC
Excise		Suresh Kumar Routray; MLA from Jatani	9 December 1999	5 March 2000	INC
Fisheries & Animal Resources Development		Haladhar Karjee; MLA from Ramagiri	9 December 1999	5 March 2000	INC
Minister of State
Health & Family Welfare		Usha Rani Panda; MLA from Aska	9 December 1999	5 March 2000	INC
Higher Education; Public Grievances & Pension Administration		Ganeswar Behera; MLA from Patamundai	9 December 1999	5 March 2000	INC
Panchayati Raj		Padma Lochan Panda; MLA from Simulia	9 December 1999	5 March 2000	INC
Schedule Tribes & Schedule Castes Development; Minorities & Backward Classes Welfare		Parama Pujari; MLA from Umarkote	9 December 1999	5 March 2000	INC
Culture; Youth Services		Prasad Kumar Harichandan; MLA from Satyabadi	9 December 1999	5 March 2000	INC
Urban Development; Tourism		Ramakanta Mishra; MLA from Ranpur	9 December 1999	5 March 2000	INC
Energy; Sports		Ripunath Seth; MLA from Bijepur	9 December 1999	5 March 2000	INC
Rural Development		Surendra Singh Bhoi; MLA from Saintala	9 December 1999	5 March 2000	INC
Science & Technology		Debendranath Mansingh; MLA from Chilika	11 December 1999	5 March 2000	INC

== Demographics ==
Division	District	Ministers	Cabinet Ministers	Ministers of State
Northern	Angul	1	–	Amarnath Pradhan
Northern	Balangir	1	–	Surendra Singh Bhoi
Northern	Bargarh	3	–	Prakash Chandra Debata; Mohan Nag; Ripunath Seth
Northern	Dhenkanal	1	–	Nabin Chandra Narayan Das
Northern	Deogarh	0	–	–
Northern	Jharsuguda	1	Hemananda Biswal (Chief Minister)	–
Northern	Keonjhar	2	Niranjan Patnaik	Jayadev Jena
Northern	Subarnapur	0	–	–
Northern	Sambalpur	1	Durga Shankar Pattanayak	–
Northern	Sundergarh	2	Kishore Chandra Patel; Gajadhar Majhi	–
Central	Balasore	1	–	Padma Lochan Panda
Central	Bhadrak	1	Netrananda Mallick	–
Central	Cuttack	3	Kahnu Charan Lenka; Sk. Matlub Ali	Bijayalaxmi Sahoo
Central	Jagatsinghpur	1	Basanta Kumar Biswal	–
Central	Jajpur	0	–	–
Central	Khorda	2	–	Suresh Kumar Routray; Debendranath Mansingh
Central	Kendrapara	2	Bhagabat Prasad Mohanty	Ganeswar Behera
Central	Mayurbhanj	1	Saraswati Hembram	–
Central	Nayagarh	1	–	Ramakanta Mishra
Central	Puri	1	–	Prasad Kumar Harichandan
Southern	Boudh	0	–	–
Southern	Gajapati	1	–	Haladhar Karjee
Southern	Ganjam	1	–	Usha Rani Panda
Southern	Kalahandi	1	Bhupinder Singh	–
Southern	Kandhamal	0	–	–
Southern	Koraput	1	Raghunath Patnaik	–
Southern	Malkangiri	0	–	–
Southern	Nabarangpur	1	–	Parama Pujari
Southern	Nuapada	1	Jagannath Patnaik	–
Southern	Rayagada	0	–	–

== See also ==
- First Hemananda Biswal ministry
- Chief Minister of Orissa
