= 11th Orissa Legislative Assembly =

11th state legislature of the Indian state of Orissa

←	10th Assembly	12th Assembly	→
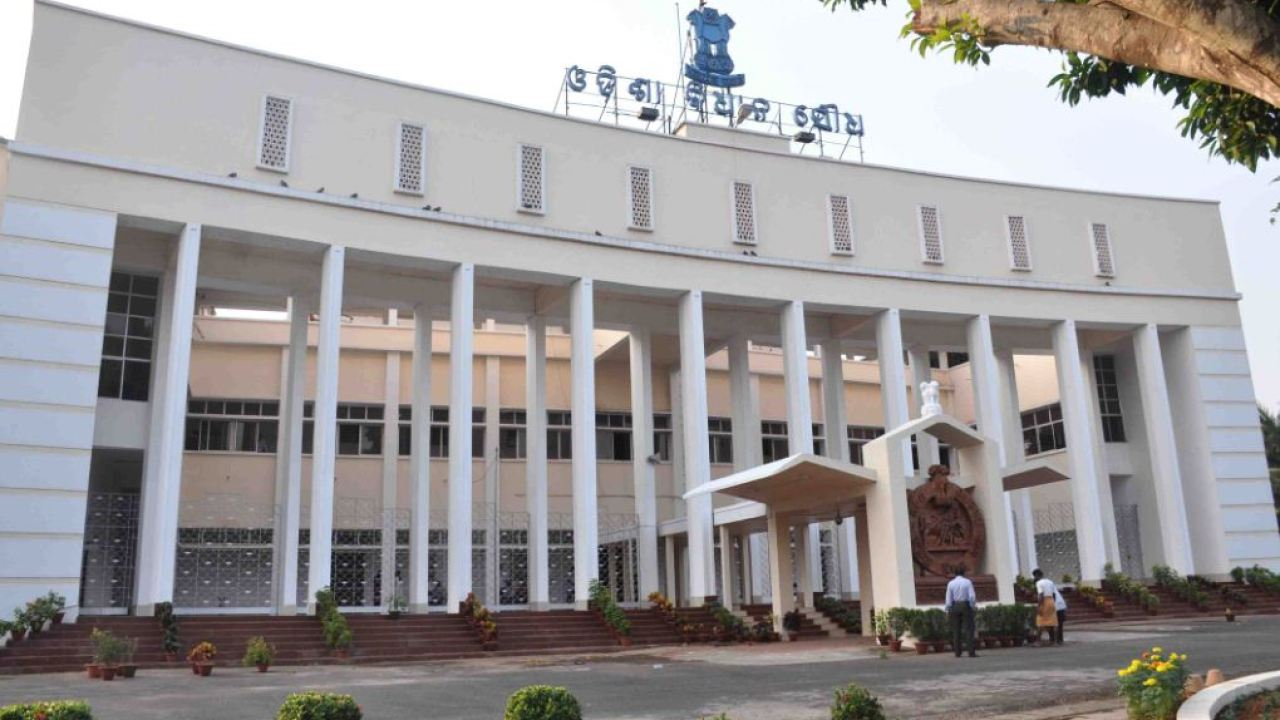
- Front view of Odisha Vidhan Saudha, Bhubaneshwar (2010)

Overview
- Meeting place: Odisha Vidhan Saudha, Bhubaneshwar, Orissa, India
- Term: 15 March 1995 – 29 February 2000
- Election: 1995 Orissa Legislative Assembly election
- Government: Indian National Congress
- Opposition: Janata Dal; Biju Janata Dal
- Website: assembly.odisha.gov.in

Orissa Legislative Assembly
- House Composition as assembly begins
- Members: 147
- Governor: B. Satya Narayan Reddy; Gopala Ramanujam; K. V. Raghunatha Reddy (acting); C. Rangarajan (acting); M. M. Rajendran
- Speaker: Kishore Chandra Patel, INC; Chintamani Dyan Samantra, IND
- Deputy Speaker: Chintamani Dyan Samantra, IND; Bibhuti Bhusan Singh Mardaraj, INC
- Leader of the House (Chief Minister): Janaki Ballabh Patnaik, INC; Giridhar Gamang, INC; Hemananda Biswal, INC
- Leader of Opposition: Biju Patnaik, JD; Ashok Kumar Das, JD; Ram Krushna Patnaik, BJD; Prafulla Samal, BJD; Satchidananda Dalal, BJD
- Party control: Indian National Congress (81/147)
- 17 Sessions with 248 Sittings

The Eleventh Orissa Legislative Assembly was convened after 1995 Orissa Legislative Assembly election. Indian National Congress came back to power after winning 80 seats. Janaki Ballabh Patnaik, Giridhar Gamang and Hemananda Biswal formed government.

== Brief history ==
Following Cong's victory in 1995 election, Chief Minister Janaki Ballabh Patnaik was sworn in by Governor B. Satya Narayan Reddy on 15 March 1995. Cabinet was further expanded on 20 March 1995, 14 January 1996, 18 August 1997 & 24 August 1998. Shri Patnaik resigned on 13 February 1999 owning moral responsibility for the series of attacks on the minorities in the state & furore over Anjana Mishra rape case. He continued as Care taker CM till 17 February 1999 following which, Chief Minister Giridhar Gamang was sworn in by Acting Governor C. Rangarajan. His ministry was further expanded on 22 February 1999. Shri Gamang resigned on 6 December 1999 following mounting criticism of his handling of rescue and rehabilitation of the 1999 super cyclone. Chief Minister Hemananda Biswal along was worn in by Governor M. M. Rajendran on 6 December 1999. His ministry was expanded on 9 December 1999. Shri Biswal resigned on 5 March 2000 following Cong's defeat in 2000 Odisha Assembly election.

== House Composition ==
Party	Strength	
Party	Assembly Begins	Assembly Dissolves
Indian National Congress	80	81
Janata Dal	46	14
Biju Janata Dal	-	25
Bharatiya Janata Party	9	11
Jharkhand Mukti Morcha	4	4
Communist Party of India	1	0
Jharkhand Party	1	1
Independent	6	8
Vacant	-	3

== Office Bearers ==
Post	Portrait	Name	Tenure		Party
Governor		B. Satya Narayan Reddy	Assembly Begins	17 June 1995	N/A
Governor		Gopala Ramanujam	18 June 1995	30 January 1997	N/A
Governor		K. V. Raghunatha Reddy (Additional Charge)	31 January 1997	12 February 1997	N/A
Governor		Gopala Ramanujam	13 February 1997	13 December 1997	N/A
Governor		K. V. Raghunatha Reddy (Additional Charge)	13 December 1997	27 April 1998	N/A
Governor		C. Rangarajan (Additional Charge)	27 April 1998	14 November 1999	N/A
Governor		M. M. Rajendran	15 November 1999	Assembly Dissolves	N/A
Speaker		Kishore Chandra Patel; MLA from Sundargarh	22 March 1995	14 January 1996	Indian National Congress
Speaker		Chintamani Dyan Samantra; MLA from Chikiti	16 February 1996	10 March 2000	Independent
Deputy Speaker		Chintamani Dyan Samantra; MLA from Chikiti	28 March 1995	12 February 1996	Independent
Deputy Speaker		Bibhuti Bhusan Singh Mardaraj; MLA from Khandapada	15 March 1996	29 February 2000	Indian National Congress
Leader of the House (Chief Minister); Leader of INC Legislature Party		Janaki Ballabh Patnaik; MLA from Begunia	15 March 1995	17 February 1999	Indian National Congress
Leader of the House (Chief Minister); Leader of INC Legislature Party		Giridhar Gamang; MLA from Laxmipur	17 February 1999	6 December 1999	Indian National Congress
Leader of the House (Chief Minister); Leader of INC Legislature Party		Hemananda Biswal; MLA from Laikera	6 December 1999	5 March 2000	Indian National Congress
Minister for Parliamentary Affairs		Basanta Kumar Biswal; MLA from Tirtol	15 March 1995	5 March 2000	Indian National Congress
Leader of Opposition; Leader of JD Legislature Party (till 1997); Leader of BJD Legislature Party (after 1998)		Biju Patnaik; MLA from Bhubaneswar	23 March 1995	20 May 1996	Janata Dal
Leader of Opposition; Leader of JD Legislature Party (till 1997); Leader of BJD Legislature Party (after 1998)		Ashok Kumar Das; MLA from Korei	22 May 1996	17 December 1997	Janata Dal
Leader of Opposition; Leader of JD Legislature Party (till 1997); Leader of BJD Legislature Party (after 1998)		Ram Krushna Patnaik; MLA from Kodala	22 February 1998	16 November 1998	Biju Janata Dal
Leader of Opposition; Leader of JD Legislature Party (till 1997); Leader of BJD Legislature Party (after 1998)		Prafulla Samal; MLA from Bhadrak	16 November 1998	1 December 1998	Biju Janata Dal
Leader of Opposition; Leader of JD Legislature Party (till 1997); Leader of BJD Legislature Party (after 1998)		Satchidananda Dalal; MLA from Boudh	11 December 1998	29 February 2000	Biju Janata Dal
Pro tem Speaker		Ghasiram Majhi; MLA from Nawapara	19 March 1995	22 March 1995	Janata Dal

== Council of Ministers ==
=== Janaki Ballabh Patnaik Ministry ===
Source
Portfolio	Portrait	Name Constituency	Tenure		Party
Chief Minister; Home; General Administration; Energy; Steel & Mines; Agriculture; Co-operation; Women & Child Development; Other departments not allocated to any Minister.		Janaki Ballabh Patnaik; MLA from Begunia	15 March 1995	17 February 1999	INC
Excise; Sports and Youth Affairs; Commerce; Labour & Employment; Public Enterprises; Minorities & Backward Classes Welfare		Janaki Ballabh Patnaik; MLA from Begunia	15 March 1995	24 August 1998	INC
Panchayati Raj		Janaki Ballabh Patnaik; MLA from Begunia	9 May 1998	24 August 1998	INC
Housing; Public Grievances & Pension Administration		Janaki Ballabh Patnaik; MLA from Begunia	9 May 1998	17 February 1999	INC
Finance		Janaki Ballabh Patnaik; MLA from Begunia	24 August 1998	17 February 1999	INC
Cabinet Minister
Deputy Chief Minister; Water Resources; Parliamentary Affairs		Basanta Kumar Biswal; MLA from Tirtol	15 March 1995	17 February 1999	INC
Finance		Basanta Kumar Biswal; MLA from Tirtol	15 March 1995	24 August 1998	INC
Planning & Coordination		Basanta Kumar Biswal; MLA from Tirtol	24 August 1998	17 February 1999	INC
Deputy Chief Minister; Panchayati Raj; Housing; Public Grievances & Pension Administration		Hemananda Biswal; MLA from Laikera	15 March 1995	9 May 1998	INC
Transport		Kahnu Charan Lenka; MLA from Choudwar	15 March 1995	17 February 1999	INC
Revenue		Kahnu Charan Lenka; MLA from Choudwar	15 March 1995	24 August 1998	INC
Revenue		Jagannath Patnaik; MLA from Nawapara	24 August 1998	17 February 1999	INC
Industries; Textiles & Handlooms; Handicraft & Cottage Industries		Niranjan Patnaik; MLA from Ramchandrapur	20 March 1995	17 February 1999	INC
Environment; Science & Technology		Prasanna Kumara Dash; MLA from Baripada	20 March 1995	17 February 1999	INC
Law		Raghunath Patnaik; MLA from Jeypore	20 March 1995	17 February 1999	INC
Forest; School & Mass Education		Ulaka Rama Chandra; MLA from Rayagada	20 March 1995	24 August 1998	INC
Minorities & Backward Classes Welfare		Ulaka Rama Chandra; MLA from Rayagada	24 August 1998	17 February 1999	INC
Higher Education		Bhagabat Prasad Mohanty; MLA from Kendrapara	20 March 1995	17 February 1999	INC
Planning & Coordination		Bhagabat Prasad Mohanty; MLA from Kendrapara	20 March 1995	24 August 1998	INC
Tourism; Culture		Bhupinder Singh; MLA from Kesinga	20 March 1995	24 August 1998	INC
Information & Public Relations		Bhupinder Singh; MLA from Kesinga	24 August 1998	17 February 1999	INC
Food Supplies & Consumer Welfare		Habibulla Khan; MLA from Nowrangpur	20 March 1995	24 August 1998	INC
Panchayati Raj		Habibulla Khan; MLA from Nowrangpur	24 August 1998	17 February 1999	INC
Works		Harihar Swain; MLA from Kabisuryanagar	20 March 1995	17 February 1999	INC
Forest; Public Enterprises		Kishore Chandra Patel; MLA from Sundargarh	24 August 1998	17 February 1999	INC
Labour & Employment		Durga Shankar Pattanayak; MLA from Sambalpur	24 August 1998	17 February 1999	INC
Rural Development		Sk. Matlub Ali; MLA from Mahanga	24 August 1998	17 February 1999	INC
Minister of State with Independent Charges
Urban Development		Amarnath Pradhan; MLA from Athmallik	20 March 1995	24 August 1998	INC
Health & Family Welfare		Amarnath Pradhan; MLA from Athmallik	24 August 1998	17 February 1999	INC
Health & Family Welfare		Jagannath Rout; MLA from Dhamnagar	20 March 1995	24 August 1998	INC
Urban Development		Jagannath Rout; MLA from Dhamnagar	24 August 1998	17 February 1999	INC
Information & Public Relations		Netrananda Mallick; MLA from Chandbali	20 March 1995	24 August 1998	INC
Tourism; Culture		Netrananda Mallick; MLA from Chandbali	24 August 1998	17 February 1999	INC
Fisheries & Animal Resources Development		Prakash Chandra Debata; MLA from Melchhamunda	20 March 1995	17 February 1999	INC
Sports and Youth Affairs		Gajadhar Majhi; MLA from Talsara	24 August 1998	17 February 1999	INC
Excise		Suresh Kumar Routray; MLA from Jatani	24 August 1998	17 February 1999	INC
Commerce		Nagarjuna Pradhan; MLA from Udayagiri	24 August 1998	17 February 1999	INC
Food Supplies & Consumer Welfare		Mohan Nag; MLA from Bhatli	24 August 1998	17 February 1999	INC
Minister of State
Panchayati Raj		Nabin Chandra Narayan Das; MLA from Dhenkanal	20 March 1995	17 February 1999	INC
Women & Child Development		Bijayalaxmi Sahoo; MLA from Cuttack Sadar	20 March 1995	17 February 1999	INC
Co-operation		Rabindra Kumar Sethy; MLA from Nimapara	20 March 1995	17 February 1999	INC
Minorities & Backward Classes Welfare		Gajadhar Majhi; MLA from Talsara	20 March 1995	24 August 1998	INC
Sports and Youth Affairs		Suresh Kumar Routray; MLA from Jatani	20 March 1995	24 August 1998	INC
Steel & Mines		Haladhar Karjee; MLA from Ramagiri	24 August 1998	17 February 1999	INC
Agriculture		Ramakanta Mishra; MLA from Ranpur	24 August 1998	17 February 1999	INC

=== Giridhar Gamang ministry ===
Source
Portfolio	Portrait	Name Constituency	Tenure		Party
Chief Minister; Home; General Administration; Other departments not allocated to any Minister.		Giridhar Gamang; MLA from Lakshmipur	17 February 1999	6 December 2000	INC
Cabinet Minister
Water Resources; Agriculture; Co-operation; Parliamentary Affairs		Basanta Kumar Biswal; MLA from Tirtol	22 February 1999	6 December 1999	INC
Rural Development; Panchayati Raj		Kahnu Charan Lenka; MLA from Choudwar	22 February 1999	6 December 1999	INC
Labour & Employment; Public Enterprises		Durga Shankar Pattanayak; MLA from Sambalpur	22 February 1999	6 December 1999	INC
Energy; Health & Family Welfare		Niranjan Patnaik; MLA from Ramchandrapur	22 February 1999	6 December 1999	INC
Higher Education; Public Grievances & Pension Administration		Bhagabat Prasad Mohanty; MLA from Kendrapara	22 February 1999	6 December 1999	INC
Works; Urban Development; Information & Public Relations		Bhupinder Singh; MLA from Kesinga	22 February 1999	6 December 1999	INC
Food Supplies & Consumer Welfare; School & Mass Education		Sk. Matlub Ali; MLA from Mahanga	22 February 1999	6 December 1999	INC
Finance; Law		Raghunath Patnaik; MLA from Jeypore	22 February 1999	6 December 1999	INC
Revenue; Fisheries & Animal Resources Development		Jagannath Patnaik; MLA from Nawapara	22 February 1999	6 December 1999	INC
Schedule Tribes & Schedule Castes Development		Gajadhar Majhi; MLA from Talsara	22 February 1999	6 December 1999	INC
Tourism; Planning & Coordination		Netrananda Mallick; MLA from Chandbali	22 February 1999	6 December 1999	INC
Women & Child Development		Saraswati Hembram; MLA from Khunta	22 February 1999	6 December 1999	INC
Minister of State with Independent Charges
Transport		Prakash Chandra Debata; MLA from Melchhamunda	22 February 1999	6 December 1999	INC
Excise; Sports and Youth Affairs		Suresh Kumar Routray; MLA from Jatani	22 February 1999	6 December 1999	INC
Commerce		Nabin Chandra Narayan Das; MLA from Dhenkanal	22 February 1999	6 December 1999	INC
Textiles & Handlooms		Bijayalaxmi Sahoo; MLA from Cuttack Sadar	22 February 1999	6 December 1999	INC
Steel & Mines		Haladhar Karjee; MLA from Ramagiri	22 February 1999	6 December 1999	INC
Minister of State
Industries		Debendranath Mansingh; MLA from Chilika	22 February 1999	6 December 1999	INC
Health & Family Welfare		Anantaram Majhi; MLA from Lakshmipur	22 February 1999	15 March 1999	INC
Fisheries & Animal Resources Development		Padmalochan Panda; MLA from Simulia	22 February 1999	6 December 1999	INC
Urban Development		Usha Rani Panda; MLA from Aska	22 February 1999	6 December 1999	INC
School & Mass Education		Ripunath Seth; MLA from Bijepur	22 February 1999	6 December 1999	INC
Home; Science & Technology; Culture		Prasad Kumar Harichandan; MLA from Satyabadi	22 February 1999	6 December 1999	INC
Forest and Environment		Surendra Singh Bhoi; MLA from Saintala	22 February 1999	6 December 1999	INC
Rural Development; Panchayati Raj		Parama Pujari; MLA from Umarkote	24 February 1999	6 December 1999	INC
Food Supplies & Consumer Welfare		Ganeswar Behera; MLA from Patamundai	24 February 1999	6 December 1999	INC

=== Hemananda Biswal ministry ===
Source
Portfolio	Portrait	Name Constituency	Tenure		Party
Chief Minister; Home; General Administration; Steel & Mines; Science & Technology; Other departments not allocated to any Minister.		Hemananda Biswal; MLA from Laikera	6 December 1999	5 March 2000	INC
Panchayati Raj; Law		Hemananda Biswal; MLA from Laikera	7 February 2000	5 March 2000	INC
Cabinet Minister
Water Resources; Agriculture; Co-operation; Parliamentary Affairs		Basanta Kumar Biswal; MLA from Tirtol	6 December 1999	5 March 2000	INC
Revenue; Youth Services		Jagannath Patnaik; MLA from Nawapara	6 December 1999	5 March 2000	INC
Rural Development; Planning & Coordination		Kahnu Charan Lenka; MLA from Choudwar	9 December 1999	5 March 2000	INC
Health & Family Welfare		Kishore Chandra Patel; MLA from Sundargarh	9 December 1999	5 March 2000	INC
Schedule Tribes & Schedule Castes Development; Minorities & Backward Classes Welfare		Gajadhar Majhi; MLA from Talsara	9 December 1999	5 March 2000	INC
Labour & Employment; Public Enterprises		Durga Shankar Pattanayak; MLA from Sambalpur	9 December 1999	5 March 2000	INC
Forest; Environment		Netrananda Mallick; MLA from Chandbali	9 December 1999	5 March 2000	INC
Energy		Niranjan Patnaik; MLA from Ramchandrapur	9 December 1999	5 March 2000	INC
Finance		Bhagabat Prasad Mohanty; MLA from Kendrapara	9 December 1999	5 March 2000	INC
Urban Development; Information & Public Relations		Bhupinder Singh; MLA from Kesinga	9 December 1999	5 March 2000	INC
Higher Education; Public Grievances & Pension Administration		Sk. Matlub Ali; MLA from Mahanga	9 December 1999	5 March 2000	INC
Panchayati Raj; Law		Raghunath Patnaik; MLA from Jeypore	9 December 1999	7 February 2000	INC
Women & Child Development		Saraswati Hembram; MLA from Khunta	9 December 1999	5 March 2000	INC
Minister of State with Independent Charges
Industries		Amarnath Pradhan; MLA from Athmallik	9 December 1999	5 March 2000	INC
School & Mass Education		Nabin Chandra Narayan Das; MLA from Dhenkanal	9 December 1999	5 March 2000	INC
Commerce and Transport		Prakash Chandra Debata; MLA from Melchhamunda	9 December 1999	5 March 2000	INC
Works; Housing		Jayadev Jena; MLA from Anandapur	9 December 1999	5 March 2000	INC
Textiles & Handlooms		Bijayalaxmi Sahoo; MLA from Cuttack Sadar	9 December 1999	5 March 2000	INC
Food Supplies & Consumer Welfare		Mohan Nag; MLA from Bhatli	9 December 1999	5 March 2000	INC
Excise		Suresh Kumar Routray; MLA from Jatani	9 December 1999	5 March 2000	INC
Fisheries & Animal Resources Development		Haladhar Karjee; MLA from Ramagiri	9 December 1999	5 March 2000	INC
Minister of State
Health & Family Welfare		Usha Rani Panda; MLA from Aska	9 December 1999	5 March 2000	INC
Higher Education; Public Grievances & Pension Administration		Ganeswar Behera; MLA from Patamundai	9 December 1999	5 March 2000	INC
Panchayati Raj		Padma Lochan Panda; MLA from Simulia	9 December 1999	5 March 2000	INC
Schedule Tribes & Schedule Castes Development; Minorities & Backward Classes Welfare		Parama Pujari; MLA from Umarkote	9 December 1999	5 March 2000	INC
Culture; Youth Services		Prasad Kumar Harichandan; MLA from Satyabadi	9 December 1999	5 March 2000	INC
Urban Development; Tourism		Ramakanta Mishra; MLA from Ranpur	9 December 1999	5 March 2000	INC
Energy; Sports		Ripunath Seth; MLA from Bijepur	9 December 1999	5 March 2000	INC
Rural Development		Surendra Singh Bhoi; MLA from Saintala	9 December 1999	5 March 2000	INC
Science & Technology		Debendranath Mansingh; MLA from Chilika	11 December 1999	5 March 2000	INC

== Members of Legislative Assembly ==
Source
District	AC. No.	Constituency	Member	Party	Remarks
Mayurbhanj	1	Karanjia (ST)	Raghunath Hembram	Janata Dal	Party splits, Joined BJD Party on 18 December 1997.
Mayurbhanj	1	Karanjia (ST)	Raghunath Hembram	Biju Janata Dal	
Mayurbhanj	2	Jashipur (ST)	Sambhunath Naik	Independent	
Mayurbhanj	3	Bahalda (ST)	Khelarama Mahali	Jharkhand People's Party	
Mayurbhanj	4	Rairangpur (ST)	Laxman Majhi	Indian National Congress	
Mayurbhanj	5	Bangriposi (ST)	Ajen Murmu	Jharkhand Mukti Morcha	
Mayurbhanj	6	Kuliana (ST)	Sudam Marndi	Jharkhand Mukti Morcha	
Mayurbhanj	7	Baripada	Prasanna Kumar Dash	Indian National Congress	
Mayurbhanj	8	Baisinga (ST)	Pruthunatha Kisku	Indian National Congress	
Mayurbhanj	9	Khunta (ST)	Saraswati Hembram	Indian National Congress	
Mayurbhanj	10	Udala (ST)	Rabaneswara Madhei	Indian National Congress	
Balasore	11	Bhograi	Kamala Das	Janata Dal	Party splits, Joined BJD Party on 18 December 1997.
Balasore	11	Bhograi	Kamala Das	Biju Janata Dal	
Balasore	12	Jaleswar	Jaynarayana Mohanty	Indian National Congress	
Balasore	13	Basta	Raghunath Mohanty	Janata Dal	
Balasore	14	Balasore	Arun Dey	Independent	
Balasore	15	Soro	Kartika Mohapatra	Indian National Congress	Resigned in May 1996 on his election to 11th Lok Sabha.
Balasore	15	Soro	Indurani Mohapatra	Indian National Congress	Won in October 1996 Bypoll.
Balasore	16	Simulia	Padma Lochan Panda	Indian National Congress	
Balasore	17	Nilgiri	Akhyay Kumar Acharya	Indian National Congress	
Bhadrak	18	Bhandaripokhari (SC)	Arjun Charan Sethi	Janata Dal	Resigned in March 1998 on his election to 12th Lok Sabha.
Bhadrak	18	Bhandaripokhari (SC)	Kumarshri Chiranjibi	Indian National Congress	Won in June 1998 Bypoll.
Bhadrak	19	Bhadrak	Prafulla Samal	Janata Dal	Party splits, Joined BJD Party on 18 December 1997.
Bhadrak	19	Bhadrak	Prafulla Samal	Biju Janata Dal	Leader of Opposition
Bhadrak	20	Dhamnagar	Jagannath Rout	Indian National Congress	Resigned in March 1999.
Bhadrak	20	Dhamnagar	Vacant (since 16 March 1999)		
Bhadrak	21	Chandbali (SC)	Netrananda Mallik	Indian National Congress	
Bhadrak	22	Basudevpur	Bijayshree Routray	Janata Dal	Party splits, Joined BJD Party on 18 December 1997.
Bhadrak	22	Basudevpur	Bijayshree Routray	Biju Janata Dal	
Jajpur	23	Sukinda	Prafulla Chandra Ghadai	Janata Dal	
Jajpur	24	Korai	Ashok Kumar Das	Janata Dal	Leader of Opposition
Jajpur	25	Jajpur (SC)	Suryamani Jena	Janata Dal	
Jajpur	26	Dharamsala	Kalpataru Das	Janata Dal	Party splits, Joined BJD Party on 18 December 1997.
Jajpur	26	Dharamsala	Kalpataru Das	Biju Janata Dal	
Jajpur	27	Barchana	Amar Prasad Satpathy	Janata Dal	Party splits, Joined BJD Party on 18 December 1997.
Jajpur	27	Barchana	Amar Prasad Satpathy	Biju Janata Dal	
Jajpur	28	Bari-Derabisi	Chinmaya Prasada Behera	Indian National Congress	
Jajpur	29	Binjharpur (SC)	Arjuna Das	Indian National Congress	
Kendrapara	30	Aul	Dola Gobinda Nayak	Indian National Congress	
Kendrapara	31	Patamundai (SC)	Ganeswar Behera	Indian National Congress	
Kendrapara	32	Rajnagar	Nalinikanta Mohanty	Janata Dal	Party splits, Joined BJD Party on 18 December 1997.
Kendrapara	32	Rajnagar	Nalinikanta Mohanty	Biju Janata Dal	
Kendrapara	33	Kendrapara	Bhagabat Prasad Mohanty	Indian National Congress	
Kendrapara	34	Patkura	Bijoy Mohapatra	Janata Dal	Party splits, Joined BJD Party on 18 December 1997.
Kendrapara	34	Patkura	Bijoy Mohapatra	Biju Janata Dal	
Jagatsinghpur	35	Tirtol	Basanta Kumar Biswal	Indian National Congress	
Jagatsinghpur	36	Ersama	Bijaya Kumar Nayak	Indian National Congress	
Jagatsinghpur	37	Balikuda	Lalatendu Mohapatra	Indian National Congress	
Jagatsinghpur	38	Jagatsinghpur (SC)	Bishnu Charan Das	Janata Dal	Party splits, Joined BJD Party on 18 December 1997.
Jagatsinghpur	38	Jagatsinghpur (SC)	Bishnu Charan Das	Biju Janata Dal	
Cuttack	39	Kissannagar	Yudhisthir Das	Janata Dal	
Cuttack	40	Mahanga	Sk. Matlub Alli	Indian National Congress	
Cuttack	41	Salepur (SC)	Rabindra Kumar Behera	Indian National Congress	
Cuttack	42	Gobindpur	Panchanan Kanungo	Janata Dal	Party splits, Joined BJD Party on 18 December 1997.
Cuttack	42	Gobindpur	Panchanan Kanungo	Biju Janata Dal	
Cuttack	43	Cuttack Sadar	Bijay Lakshmi Sahoo	Indian National Congress	
Cuttack	44	Cuttack City	Samir Dey	Bharatiya Janata Party	
Cuttack	45	Choudwar	Kahnu Charan Lenka	Indian National Congress	
Cuttack	46	Banki	Pravat Tripathy	Janata Dal	Party splits, Joined BJD Party on 18 December 1997.
Cuttack	46	Banki	Pravat Tripathy	Biju Janata Dal	
Cuttack	47	Athgarh	Ranendra Pratap Swain	Janata Dal	
Cuttack	48	Baramba	Debiprasad Mishra	Janata Dal	Party splits, Joined BJD Party on 18 December 1997.
Cuttack	48	Baramba	Debiprasad Mishra	Biju Janata Dal	
Khurda	49	Balipatna (SC)	Hrushikesh Nayak	Janata Dal	
Khurda	50	Bhubaneswar	Biju Patnaik	Janata Dal	Leader of Opposition, Resigned in May 1996 on his election to 11th Lok Sabha.
Khurda	50	Bhubaneswar	Biswabhusan Harichandan	Bharatiya Janata Party	Won in October 1996 Bypoll.
Khurda	51	Jatni	Suresh Kumar Routray	Indian National Congress	
Puri	52	Pipli	Yudhistir Samantaray	Indian National Congress	
Puri	53	Nimapara (SC)	Rabindra Kumar Sethy	Indian National Congress	
Puri	54	Kakatpur	Baikunthanath Swain	Indian National Congress	Expired on 2 October 1995.
Puri	54	Kakatpur	Surendra Nath Naik	Janata Dal	Won in May 1996 Bypoll.
Puri	55	Satyabadi	Prasad Kumar Harichandan	Indian National Congress	
Puri	56	Puri	Maheswar Mohanty	Janata Dal	Party splits, Joined BJD Party on 18 December 1997.
Puri	56	Puri	Maheswar Mohanty	Biju Janata Dal	
Puri	57	Brahmagiri	Lalatendu Bidyadhar Mohapatra	Indian National Congress	
Khurda	58	Chilka	Debendra Nath Mansingh	Indian National Congress	
Khurda	59	Khurda	Prasanna Kumar Patasani	Janata Dal	Party splits, Joined BJD Party on 18 December 1997.
Khurda	59	Khurda	Prasanna Kumar Patasani	Biju Janata Dal	Resigned in March 1998 on his election to 12th Lok Sabha.
Khurda	59	Khurda	Dilip Shrichandan	Bharatiya Janata Party	Won in June 1998 Bypoll.
Khurda	60	Begunia	Harihara Sahoo	Indian National Congress	Resigned in April 1995.
Khurda	60	Begunia	Janaki Ballabh Patnaik	Indian National Congress	Won in 1995 Bypoll. Chief Minister
Nayagarh	61	Ranpur	Ramakanta Mishra	Indian National Congress	
Nayagarh	62	Nayagarh	Sitakanta Mishra	Indian National Congress	
Nayagarh	63	Khandapara	Bibhuti Bhusan Singh Mardaraj	Indian National Congress	Deputy Speaker
Nayagarh	64	Daspalla	Rudra Madhab Ray	Janata Dal	Resigned in February 1997 on his election to Zilla Parishad.
Nayagarh	64	Daspalla	Harihar Karan	Independent	Won in May 1997 Bypoll.
Ganjam	65	Jaganathprasad (SC)	Madhaba Nanda Behera	Janata Dal	Party splits, Joined BJD Party on 18 December 1997.
Ganjam	65	Jaganathprasad (SC)	Madhaba Nanda Behera	Biju Janata Dal	
Ganjam	66	Bhanjanagar	Bikram Keshari Arukha	Janata Dal	Party splits, Joined BJD Party on 18 December 1997.
Ganjam	66	Bhanjanagar	Bikram Keshari Arukha	Biju Janata Dal	Disqualified by Supreme Court on 14 September 1999.
Ganjam	66	Bhanjanagar	Vacant (since 14 September 1999)		
Ganjam	67	Suruda	Ananta Narayan Singh Deo	Bharatiya Janata Party	
Ganjam	68	Aska	Usha Rani Panda	Indian National Congress	
Ganjam	69	Kabisuryanagar	Harihar Swain	Indian National Congress	
Ganjam	70	Kodala	Ram Krushna Patnaik	Janata Dal	Party splits, Joined BJD Party on 18 December 1997.
Ganjam	70	Kodala	Ram Krushna Patnaik	Biju Janata Dal	Leader of Opposition
Ganjam	71	Khallikote	V. Sugnana Kumari Deo	Janata Dal	Party splits, Joined BJD Party on 18 December 1997.
Ganjam	71	Khallikote	V. Sugnana Kumari Deo	Biju Janata Dal	
Ganjam	72	Chatrapur	Daitari Behara	Indian National Congress	
Ganjam	73	Hinjili	Udayanath Nayak	Indian National Congress	
Ganjam	74	Gopalpur (SC)	Rama Chandra Sethy	Janata Dal	
Ganjam	74	Gopalpur (SC)	Rama Chandra Sethy	Biju Janata Dal	
Ganjam	75	Berhampur	Ramesh Chandra Chyau Patnaik	Janata Dal	Party splits, Joined BJD Party on 18 December 1997.
Ganjam	75	Berhampur	Ramesh Chandra Chyau Patnaik	Biju Janata Dal	
Ganjam	76	Chikiti	Chintamani Dyan Samantara	Independent	Speaker
Gajapati	77	Mohana	Surjya Narayan Patro	Janata Dal	Party splits, Joined BJD Party on 18 December 1997.
Gajapati	77	Mohana	Surjya Narayan Patro	Biju Janata Dal	
Gajapati	78	Ramagiri (ST)	Haladhar Karjee	Indian National Congress	
Gajapati	79	Parlakhemundi	Trinath Sahu	Independent	
Rayagada	80	Gunupur (ST)	Akshya Kumar Gomango	Indian National Congress	Expired on 21 April 1995.
Rayagada	80	Gunupur (ST)	Bhagirathi Gomango	Independent	Won in May 1996 Bypoll.
Rayagada	81	Bissam-cuttack (ST)	Dambarudhar Ulaka	Indian National Congress	
Rayagada	82	Rayagada (ST)	Ulaka Rama Chandra	Indian National Congress	
Koraput	83	Lakshmipur (ST)	Anantaram Majhi	Indian National Congress	Resigned in March 1999.
Koraput	83	Lakshmipur (ST)	Giridhar Gamang	Indian National Congress	Won on 1999 Bypoll. Chief Minister
Koraput	84	Pottangi (ST)	Ram Chandra Kadam	Indian National Congress	
Koraput	85	Koraput	Gupta Prasad Das	Indian National Congress	
Malkangiri	86	Malkangiri (SC)	Arabinda Dhali	Bharatiya Janata Party	
Malkangiri	87	Chitrakonda (ST)	Gangadhar Madi	Indian National Congress	
Koraput	88	Kotpad (ST)	Basudev Majhi	Indian National Congress	
Koraput	89	Jeypore	Raghunath Patnaik	Indian National Congress	
Nowrangpur	90	Nowrangpur	Habibulla Khan	Indian National Congress	
Nowrangpur	91	Kodinga (ST)	Sadan Nayak	Indian National Congress	
Nowrangpur	92	Dabugam (ST)	Jadav Majhi	Janata Dal	Party splits, Joined BJD Party on 18 December 1997.
Nowrangpur	92	Dabugam (ST)	Jadav Majhi	Biju Janata Dal	Expired on 3 April 1999.
Nowrangpur	92	Dabugam (ST)	Vacant (since 3 April 1999)		
Nowrangpur	93	Umarkote (ST)	Parama Pujari	Indian National Congress	
Nawapara	94	Nawapara	Ghasiram Majhi	Janata Dal	Expired on 23 April 1997.
Nawapara	94	Nawapara	Jagannath Patnaik	Indian National Congress	Won in May 1997 Bypoll.
Nawapara	95	Khariar	Duryodhan Majhi	Janata Dal	
Kalahandi	96	Dharamgarh (SC)	Bira Sipka	Janata Dal	
Kalahandi	97	Koksara	Roshini Singh Deo	Janata Dal	Party splits, Joined BJD Party on 18 December 1997.
Kalahandi	97	Koksara	Roshini Singh Deo	Biju Janata Dal	
Kalahandi	98	Junagarh	Bikram Keshari Deo	Bharatiya Janata Party	Resigned in March 1998 on his election to 12th Lok Sabha.
Kalahandi	98	Junagarh	Himansu Sekhar Meher	Bharatiya Janata Party	Won in June 1998 Bypoll.
Kalahandi	99	Bhawanipatna (SC)	Pradipta Kumar Naik	Bharatiya Janata Party	
Kalahandi	100	Narla (ST)	Balabhadra Majhi	Janata Dal	Party splits, Joined BJD Party on 18 December 1997.
Kalahandi	100	Narla (ST)	Balabhadra Majhi	Biju Janata Dal	
Kalahandi	101	Kesinga	Bhupinder Singh	Indian National Congress	
Kandhamal	102	Balliguda (ST)	Sahura Mallick	Indian National Congress	
Kandhamal	103	Udayagiri (ST)	Nagarjuna Pradhan	Indian National Congress	
Kandhamal	104	Phulbani (SC)	Dasarathi Behera	Independent	
Boudh	105	Boudh	Satchidananda Dalal	Janata Dal	Party splits, Joined BJD Party on 18 December 1997.
Boudh	105	Boudh	Satchidananda Dalal	Biju Janata Dal	Leader of Opposition
Balangir	106	Titilagarh (SC)	Jogendra Behera	Janata Dal	
Balangir	107	Kantabanji	Santosh Singh Saluja	Indian National Congress	
Balangir	108	Patnagarh	Kanak Vardhan Singh Deo	Bharatiya Janata Party	
Balangir	109	Saintala	Surendra Singh Bhoi	Indian National Congress	
Balangir	110	Loisingha	Balgopal Mishra	Independent	
Balangir	111	Bolangir	Ananga Udaya Singh Deo	Janata Dal	Party splits, Joined BJD Party on 18 December 1997.
Balangir	111	Bolangir	Ananga Udaya Singh Deo	Biju Janata Dal	
Subarnapur	112	Sonepur (SC)	Kunduru Kushal	Janata Dal	Party splits, Joined BJD Party on 18 December 1997.
Subarnapur	112	Sonepur (SC)	Kunduru Kushal	Biju Janata Dal	
Subarnapur	113	Binka	Narasingha Mishra	Janata Dal	
Subarnapur	114	Birmaharajpur	Ram Chandra Pradhan	Indian National Congress	
Angul	115	Athmallik	Amarnath Pradhan	Indian National Congress	
Angul	116	Angul	Ramesh Jena	Indian National Congress	
Dhenkanal	117	Hindol (SC)	Maheswar Naik	Indian National Congress	
Dhenkanal	118	Dhenkanal	Nabin Chandra Narayandas	Indian National Congress	
Dhenkanal	119	Gondia	Nandini Satapathy	Indian National Congress	
Angul	120	Kamakhyanagar	Kailash Chandra Mohapatra	Indian National Congress	Expired on 17 September 1996.
Angul	120	Kamakhyanagar	Premalata Mohapatra	Indian National Congress	Won in February 1997 Bypoll.
Angul	121	Pallahara	Bibhudhendra Pratap Das	Indian National Congress	
Angul	122	Talcher (SC)	Mahesh Sahoo	Bharatiya Janata Party	
Bargarh	123	Padampur	Bijaya Ranjan Singh Bariha	Janata Dal	
Bargarh	124	Melchhamunda	Prakash Chandra Debta	Indian National Congress	
Bargarh	125	Bijepur	Ripunath Seth	Indian National Congress	
Bargarh	126	Bhatli (SC)	Mohan Nag	Indian National Congress	
Bargarh	127	Bargarh	Prasanna Acharya	Janata Dal	Party splits, Joined BJD Party on 18 December 1997.
Bargarh	127	Bargarh	Prasanna Acharya	Biju Janata Dal	Resigned in March 1998 on his election to 12th Lok Sabha.
Bargarh	127	Bargarh	Ananda Acharya	Biju Janata Dal	Won in June 1998 Bypoll.
Sambalpur	128	Sambalpur	Durga Shankar Patanaik	Indian National Congress	
Jharsuguda	129	Brajarajnagar	Prasanna Kumar Panda	Communist Party of India	Expired on 26 December 1997.
Jharsuguda	129	Brajarajnagar	Keshab Sahoo	Indian National Congress	Won in February 1998 Bypoll.
Jharsuguda	130	Jharsuguda	Birendra Chandra Pandey	Indian National Congress	
Jharsuguda	131	Laikera (ST)	Hemananda Biswal	Indian National Congress	Chief Minister
Sambalpur	132	Kuchinda (ST)	Panu Chandra Naik	Indian National Congress	
Sambalpur	133	Rairakhol (SC)	Abhimanyu Kumar	Indian National Congress	
Deogarh	134	Deogarh	Pradipta Gang Deb	Janata Dal	Expired on 20 October 1997.
Deogarh	134	Deogarh	Subash Chandra Panigrahi	Bharatiya Janata Party	Won in February 1998 Bypoll.
Sundergarh	135	Sundargarh	Kishore Chandra Patel	Indian National Congress	Speaker
Sundergarh	136	Talsara (ST)	Gajadhar Majhi	Indian National Congress	
Sundergarh	137	Rajgangpur (ST)	Mangala Kisan	Janata Dal	
Sundergarh	138	Biramitrapur (ST)	George Tirkey	Jharkhand Mukti Morcha	
Sundergarh	139	Rourkela	Prabhat Mohapatra	Indian National Congress	
Sundergarh	140	Raghunathpali (ST)	Mansid Ekka	Jharkhand Mukti Morcha	
Sundergarh	141	Bonai (ST)	Jual Oram	Bharatiya Janata Party	Resigned in March 1998 on his election to 12th Lok Sabha.
Sundergarh	141	Bonai (ST)	Janardan Dehury	Indian National Congress	Won in June 1998 Bypoll.
Keonjhar	142	Champua (ST)	Dhanurjay Laguri	Indian National Congress	
Keonjhar	143	Patna	Hrushikesh Naik	Indian National Congress	
Keonjhar	144	Keonjhar (ST)	Jogendra Naik	Bharatiya Janata Party	
Keonjhar	145	Telkoi (ST)	Chandrasena Naik	Indian National Congress	
Keonjhar	146	Ramchandrapur	Niranjan Patnaik	Indian National Congress	
Keonjhar	147	Anandapur (SC)	Jayadev Jena	Indian National Congress	

== Bypolls ==
Source
Year	Constituency	Reason for by-poll	Winning candidate	Party
May 1995	Begunia	Resignation of Harihara Sahoo	Janaki Ballabh Patnaik	Indian National Congress
May 1996	Gunupur (ST)	Death of Akshya Kumar Gomango	Bhagirathi Gomango	Independent
May 1996	Kakatpur	Death of Baikunthanath Swain	Surendra Nath Naik	Janata Dal
October 1996	Soro	Resignation of Kartika Mohapatra	Indurani Mohapatra	Indian National Congress
October 1996	Bhubaneswar	Resignation of Biju Patnaik	Biswabhusan Harichandan	Bharatiya Janata Party
February 1997	Kamakhyanagar	Death of Kailash Chandra Mohapatra	Premalata Mohapatra	Indian National Congress
May 1997	Daspalla	Resignation of Rudra Madhab Ray	Harihar Karan	Independent
May 1997	Nawapara	Death of Ghasiram Majhi	Jagannath Patnaik	Indian National Congress
February 1998	Brajarajnagar	Death of Prasanna Kumar Panda	Keshab Sahoo	Indian National Congress
February 1998	Deogarh	Death of Pradipta Gang Deb	Subash Chandra Panigrahi	Bharatiya Janata Party
June 1998	Bhandaripokhari (SC)	Resignation of Arjun Charan Sethi	Kumarshri Chiranjibi	Indian National Congress
June 1998	Khurda	Resignation of Prasanna Kumar Patasani	Dilip Shrichandan	Bharatiya Janata Party
June 1998	Junagarh	Resignation of Bikram Keshari Deo	Himansu Sekhar Meher	Bharatiya Janata Party
June 1998	Bargarh	Resignation of Prasanna Acharya	Ananda Acharya	Biju Janata Dal
June 1998	Bonai (ST)	Resignation of Jual Oram	Janardan Dehury	Indian National Congress
June 1999	Lakshmipur (ST)	Resignation of Anantaram Majhi	Giridhar Gamang	Indian National Congress
