= Third Janaki Ballabh Patnaik ministry =

Government of Odisha, India (1995–1999)

- 22nd Ministry of Orissa
- 1995 – 1999
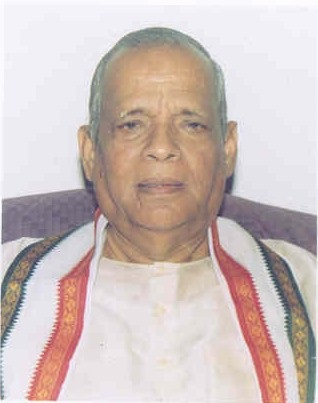
- Janaki Ballabh Patnaik; Hon'ble Chief Minister of Orissa
- Date formed: 15 March 1995
- Date dissolved: 17 February 1999

People and organisations
- Governor: B. Satya Narayan Reddy; Gopala Ramanujam; K. V. Raghunatha Reddy (Additional Charge); C. Rangarajan (Additional Charge)
- Chief Minister: Janaki Ballabh Patnaik
- Deputy Chief Minister: Basanta Kumar Biswal; Hemananda Biswal
- No. of ministers: 27
- Member parties: Indian National Congress
- Status in legislature: Majority
- Opposition party: Janata Dal; Biju Janata Dal
- Opposition leader: Biju Patnaik, JD (1995 – 1996); Ashok Kumar Das, JD (1996 – 1997); Ram Krushna Patnaik, BJD (Feb – Nov 1998); Prafulla Samal, BJD (Nov – Dec 1998); Satchidananda Dalal, BJD (1998 – 2000)

History
- Incoming formation: 11th Orissa Legislative Assembly
- Outgoing formation: 10th Orissa Legislative Assembly
- Election: 1995 Assembly election
- Legislature terms: 3 years, 339 days
- Predecessor: Second Biju Patnaik ministry
- Successor: Giridhar Gamang ministry

Janaki Ballabh Patnaik was elected as the chief minister of Orissa following Indian National Congress party's victory in 1995 Orissa Legislative Assembly election.

== Brief history ==
Chief Minister Janaki Ballabh Patnaik along with 2 deputy chief ministers and 2 Cabinet Ministers were administered the oath of office and secrecy by Governor B. Satya Narayan Reddy at the Raj Bhavan, Bhubaneswar on 15 March 1995. On 20 March 1995, 8 Cabinet Ministers, 4 Ministers of State (Independent Charges) and 5 Ministers of State were included in the Council of Ministers and on 14 January 1996, 2 Cabinet Ministers and 5 Ministers of State were included in the Council of Ministers.

On 18 August 1997, 1 Ministers of State (Independent Charges) was elevated to Cabinet Minister and on 24 August 1998, Entire Council of Ministers was reshuffled with addition of 1 Minister of State.

Shri Patnaik resigned on 13 February 1999 owning moral responsibility for the series of attacks on the minorities in the state & furore over Anjana Mishra rape case. He continued as Care taker CM till 17 February 1999.

== Council of Ministers ==
Source
Portfolio	Portrait	Name Constituency	Tenure		Party
Chief Minister; Home; General Administration; Energy; Steel & Mines; Agriculture; Co-operation; Women & Child Development; Other departments not allocated to any Minister.		Janaki Ballabh Patnaik; MLA from Begunia	15 March 1995	17 February 1999	INC
Excise; Sports and Youth Affairs; Commerce; Labour & Employment; Public Enterprises; Minorities & Backward Classes Welfare		Janaki Ballabh Patnaik; MLA from Begunia	15 March 1995	24 August 1998	INC
Panchayati Raj		Janaki Ballabh Patnaik; MLA from Begunia	9 May 1998	24 August 1998	INC
Housing; Public Grievances & Pension Administration		Janaki Ballabh Patnaik; MLA from Begunia	9 May 1998	17 February 1999	INC
Finance		Janaki Ballabh Patnaik; MLA from Begunia	24 August 1998	17 February 1999	INC
Cabinet Minister
Deputy Chief Minister; Water Resources; Parliamentary Affairs		Basanta Kumar Biswal; MLA from Tirtol	15 March 1995	17 February 1999	INC
Finance		Basanta Kumar Biswal; MLA from Tirtol	15 March 1995	24 August 1998	INC
Planning & Coordination		Basanta Kumar Biswal; MLA from Tirtol	24 August 1998	17 February 1999	INC
Deputy Chief Minister; Panchayati Raj; Housing; Public Grievances & Pension Administration		Hemananda Biswal; MLA from Laikera	15 March 1995	9 May 1998	INC
Transport		Kahnu Charan Lenka; MLA from Choudwar	15 March 1995	17 February 1999	INC
Revenue		Kahnu Charan Lenka; MLA from Choudwar	15 March 1995	24 August 1998	INC
Revenue		Jagannath Patnaik; MLA from Nawapara	24 August 1998	17 February 1999	INC
Industries; Textiles & Handlooms; Handicraft & Cottage Industries		Niranjan Patnaik; MLA from Ramchandrapur	20 March 1995	17 February 1999	INC
Environment; Science & Technology		Prasanna Kumara Dash; MLA from Baripada	20 March 1995	17 February 1999	INC
Law		Raghunath Patnaik; MLA from Jeypore	20 March 1995	17 February 1999	INC
Forest; School & Mass Education		Ulaka Rama Chandra; MLA from Rayagada	20 March 1995	24 August 1998	INC
Minorities & Backward Classes Welfare		Ulaka Rama Chandra; MLA from Rayagada	24 August 1998	17 February 1999	INC
Higher Education		Bhagabat Prasad Mohanty; MLA from Kendrapara	20 March 1995	17 February 1999	INC
Planning & Coordination		Bhagabat Prasad Mohanty; MLA from Kendrapara	20 March 1995	24 August 1998	INC
Tourism; Culture		Bhupinder Singh; MLA from Kesinga	20 March 1995	24 August 1998	INC
Information & Public Relations		Bhupinder Singh; MLA from Kesinga	24 August 1998	17 February 1999	INC
Food Supplies & Consumer Welfare		Habibulla Khan; MLA from Nowrangpur	20 March 1995	24 August 1998	INC
Panchayati Raj		Habibulla Khan; MLA from Nowrangpur	24 August 1998	17 February 1999	INC
Works		Harihar Swain; MLA from Kabisuryanagar	20 March 1995	17 February 1999	INC
Forest; Public Enterprises		Kishore Chandra Patel; MLA from Sundargarh	24 August 1998	17 February 1999	INC
Labour & Employment		Durga Shankar Pattanayak; MLA from Sambalpur	24 August 1998	17 February 1999	INC
Rural Development		Sk. Matlub Ali; MLA from Mahanga	24 August 1998	17 February 1999	INC
Minister of State with Independent Charges
Urban Development		Amarnath Pradhan; MLA from Athmallik	20 March 1995	24 August 1998	INC
Health & Family Welfare		Amarnath Pradhan; MLA from Athmallik	24 August 1998	17 February 1999	INC
Health & Family Welfare		Jagannath Rout; MLA from Dhamnagar	20 March 1995	24 August 1998	INC
Urban Development		Jagannath Rout; MLA from Dhamnagar	24 August 1998	17 February 1999	INC
Information & Public Relations		Netrananda Mallick; MLA from Chandbali	20 March 1995	24 August 1998	INC
Tourism; Culture		Netrananda Mallick; MLA from Chandbali	24 August 1998	17 February 1999	INC
Fisheries & Animal Resources Development		Prakash Chandra Debata; MLA from Melchhamunda	20 March 1995	17 February 1999	INC
Sports and Youth Affairs		Gajadhar Majhi; MLA from Talsara	24 August 1998	17 February 1999	INC
Excise		Suresh Kumar Routray; MLA from Jatani	24 August 1998	17 February 1999	INC
Commerce		Nagarjuna Pradhan; MLA from Udayagiri	24 August 1998	17 February 1999	INC
Food Supplies & Consumer Welfare		Mohan Nag; MLA from Bhatli	24 August 1998	17 February 1999	INC
Minister of State
Panchayati Raj		Nabin Chandra Narayan Das; MLA from Dhenkanal	20 March 1995	17 February 1999	INC
Women & Child Development		Bijayalaxmi Sahoo; MLA from Cuttack Sadar	20 March 1995	17 February 1999	INC
Co-operation		Rabindra Kumar Sethy; MLA from Nimapara	20 March 1995	17 February 1999	INC
Minorities & Backward Classes Welfare		Gajadhar Majhi; MLA from Talsara	20 March 1995	24 August 1998	INC
Sports and Youth Affairs		Suresh Kumar Routray; MLA from Jatani	20 March 1995	24 August 1998	INC
Steel & Mines		Haladhar Karjee; MLA from Ramagiri	24 August 1998	17 February 1999	INC
Agriculture		Ramakanta Mishra; MLA from Ranpur	24 August 1998	17 February 1999	INC

== Demographics ==
Division	District	Ministers	Cabinet Ministers	Ministers of State
Northern	Angul	1	–	Amarnath Pradhan
Northern	Balangir	0	–	–
Northern	Bargarh	2	–	Prakash Chandra Debata; Mohan Nag
Northern	Dhenkanal	1	–	Nabin Chandra Narayan Das
Northern	Deogarh	0	–	–
Northern	Jharsuguda	1	Hemananda Biswal (Deputy CM)	–
Northern	Keonjhar	2	Niranjan Patnaik	–
Northern	Subarnapur	0	–	–
Northern	Sambalpur	1	Durga Shankar Pattanayak	–
Northern	Sundergarh	2	Kishore Chandra Patel	Gajadhar Majhi
Central	Balasore	0	–	–
Central	Bhadrak	2	–	Netrananda Mallick; Jagannath Rout
Central	Cuttack	3	Kahnu Charan Lenka; Sk. Matlub Ali	Bijayalaxmi Sahoo
Central	Jagatsinghpur	1	Basanta Kumar Biswal (Deputy CM)	–
Central	Jajpur	0	–	–
Central	Khorda	2	Janaki Ballabh Patnaik (Chief Minister)	Suresh Kumar Routray
Central	Kendrapara	1	Bhagabat Prasad Mohanty	–
Central	Mayurbhanj	1	Prasanna Kumara Dash	–
Central	Nayagarh	1	–	Ramakanta Mishra
Central	Puri	1	–	Rabindra Kumar Sethy
Southern	Boudh	0	–	–
Southern	Gajapati	1	–	Haladhar Karjee
Southern	Ganjam	1	Harihar Swain	–
Southern	Kalahandi	1	Bhupinder Singh	–
Southern	Kandhamal	1	–	Nagarjuna Pradhan
Southern	Koraput	1	Raghunath Patnaik	–
Southern	Malkangiri	0	–	–
Southern	Nabarangpur	1	Habibulla Khan	–
Southern	Nuapada	1	Jagannath Patnaik	–
Southern	Rayagada	1	Ulaka Rama Chandra	–
