= Giridhar Gamang ministry =

Government of Orissa (Feb – Dec 1999)

- 23rd Ministry of Orissa
- Feb – Dec 1999
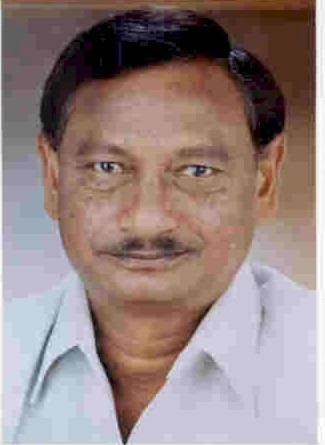
- Giridhar Gamang; Hon'ble Chief Minister of Orissa
- Date formed: 17 February 1999
- Date dissolved: 6 December 1999

People and organisations
- Governor: C. Rangarajan (Additional Charge); M. M. Rajendran
- Chief Minister: Giridhar Gamang
- No. of ministers: 27
- Member parties: Indian National Congress
- Status in legislature: Majority
- Opposition party: Biju Janata Dal
- Opposition leader: Satchidananda Dalal

History
- Incoming formation: 11th Orissa Legislative Assembly
- Election: 1995 Assembly election
- Legislature term: 292 days
- Predecessor: Third Janaki Ballabh Patnaik ministry
- Successor: Second Hemananda Biswal ministry

Giridhar Gamang was elected as the chief minister of Orissa in february 1999 after Janaki Ballabh Patnaik resigned as chief minister owning moral responsibility for the series of attacks on the minorities in the state.

== Brief history ==
Chief Minister Giridhar Gamang along with 2 Cabinet Ministers were administered the oath of office and secrecy by Acting Governor C. Rangarajan at the Raj Bhavan, Bhubaneswar on 17 February 1999. On 22 February 1999, 12 Cabinet Ministers, 5 Ministers of State (Independent Charge) and 7 Ministers of State were sworn into Council of Ministers and on 24 February 1999, another 2 Ministers of State were included in the Council of Ministers. Shri Gamang resigned on 6 December 1999 following mounting criticism of his handling of rescue and rehabilitation of the 1999 super cyclone.

== Council of Ministers ==
Source
| Portfolio | Portrait | Name Constituency | Tenure | | Party |
|---|---|---|---|---|---|
| Chief Minister; Home; General Administration; Other departments not allocated to any Minister. | | Giridhar Gamang; MLA from Lakshmipur | 17 February 1999 | 6 December 2000 | INC |
Cabinet Minister
| Water Resources; Agriculture; Co-operation; Parliamentary Affairs | | Basanta Kumar Biswal; MLA from Tirtol | 22 February 1999 | 6 December 1999 | INC |
| Rural Development; Panchayati Raj | | Kahnu Charan Lenka; MLA from Choudwar | 22 February 1999 | 6 December 1999 | INC |
| Labour & Employment; Public Enterprises | | Durga Shankar Pattanayak; MLA from Sambalpur | 22 February 1999 | 6 December 1999 | INC |
| Energy; Health & Family Welfare | | Niranjan Patnaik; MLA from Ramchandrapur | 22 February 1999 | 6 December 1999 | INC |
| Higher Education; Public Grievances & Pension Administration | | Bhagabat Prasad Mohanty; MLA from Kendrapara | 22 February 1999 | 6 December 1999 | INC |
| Works; Urban Development; Information & Public Relations | | Bhupinder Singh; MLA from Kesinga | 22 February 1999 | 6 December 1999 | INC |
| Food Supplies & Consumer Welfare; School & Mass Education | | Sk. Matlub Ali; MLA from Mahanga | 22 February 1999 | 6 December 1999 | INC |
| Finance; Law | | Raghunath Patnaik; MLA from Jeypore | 22 February 1999 | 6 December 1999 | INC |
| Revenue; Fisheries & Animal Resources Development | | Jagannath Patnaik; MLA from Nawapara | 22 February 1999 | 6 December 1999 | INC |
| Schedule Tribes & Schedule Castes Development | | Gajadhar Majhi; MLA from Talsara | 22 February 1999 | 6 December 1999 | INC |
| Tourism; Planning & Coordination | | Netrananda Mallick; MLA from Chandbali | 22 February 1999 | 6 December 1999 | INC |
| Women & Child Development | | Saraswati Hembram; MLA from Khunta | 22 February 1999 | 6 December 1999 | INC |
Minister of State with Independent Charges
| Transport | | Prakash Chandra Debata; MLA from Melchhamunda | 22 February 1999 | 6 December 1999 | INC |
| Excise; Sports and Youth Affairs | | Suresh Kumar Routray; MLA from Jatani | 22 February 1999 | 6 December 1999 | INC |
| Commerce | | Nabin Chandra Narayan Das; MLA from Dhenkanal | 22 February 1999 | 6 December 1999 | INC |
| Textiles & Handlooms | | Bijayalaxmi Sahoo; MLA from Cuttack Sadar | 22 February 1999 | 6 December 1999 | INC |
| Steel & Mines | | Haladhar Karjee; MLA from Ramagiri | 22 February 1999 | 6 December 1999 | INC |
Minister of State
| Industries | | Debendranath Mansingh; MLA from Chilika | 22 February 1999 | 6 December 1999 | INC |
| Health & Family Welfare | | Anantaram Majhi; MLA from Lakshmipur | 22 February 1999 | 15 March 1999 | INC |
| Fisheries & Animal Resources Development | | Padmalochan Panda; MLA from Simulia | 22 February 1999 | 6 December 1999 | INC |
| Urban Development | | Usha Rani Panda; MLA from Aska | 22 February 1999 | 6 December 1999 | INC |
| School & Mass Education | | Ripunath Seth; MLA from Bijepur | 22 February 1999 | 6 December 1999 | INC |
| Home; Science & Technology; Culture | | Prasad Kumar Harichandan; MLA from Satyabadi | 22 February 1999 | 6 December 1999 | INC |
| Forest and Environment | | Surendra Singh Bhoi; MLA from Saintala | 22 February 1999 | 6 December 1999 | INC |
| Rural Development; Panchayati Raj | | Parama Pujari; MLA from Umarkote | 24 February 1999 | 6 December 1999 | INC |
| Food Supplies & Consumer Welfare | | Ganeswar Behera; MLA from Patamundai | 24 February 1999 | 6 December 1999 | INC |

== Demographics ==
| Division | District | Ministers | Cabinet Ministers | Ministers of State |
|---|---|---|---|---|
| Northern | Angul | 1 | – | – |
| Northern | Balangir | 1 | – | Surendra Singh Bhoi |
| Northern | Bargarh | 2 | – | Prakash Chandra Debata; Ripunath Seth |
| Northern | Dhenkanal | 1 | – | Nabin Chandra Narayan Das |
| Northern | Deogarh | 0 | – | – |
| Northern | Jharsuguda | 0 | – | – |
| Northern | Keonjhar | 1 | Niranjan Patnaik | – |
| Northern | Subarnapur | 0 | – | – |
| Northern | Sambalpur | 1 | Durga Shankar Pattanayak | – |
| Northern | Sundergarh | 2 | Kishore Chandra Patel; Gajadhar Majhi | – |
| Central | Balasore | 1 | – | Padma Lochan Panda |
| Central | Bhadrak | 1 | Netrananda Mallick | – |
| Central | Cuttack | 3 | Kahnu Charan Lenka; Sk. Matlub Ali | Bijayalaxmi Sahoo |
| Central | Jagatsinghpur | 1 | Basanta Kumar Biswal | – |
| Central | Jajpur | 0 | – | – |
| Central | Khorda | 2 | – | Suresh Kumar Routray; Debendranath Mansingh |
| Central | Kendrapara | 2 | Bhagabat Prasad Mohanty | Ganeswar Behera |
| Central | Mayurbhanj | 1 | Saraswati Hembram | – |
| Central | Nayagarh | 1 | – | Ramakanta Mishra |
| Central | Puri | 1 | – | Prasad Kumar Harichandan |
| Southern | Boudh | 0 | – | – |
| Southern | Gajapati | 1 | – | Haladhar Karjee |
| Southern | Ganjam | 1 | – | Usha Rani Panda |
| Southern | Kalahandi | 1 | Bhupinder Singh | – |
| Southern | Kandhamal | 0 | – | – |
| Southern | Koraput | 3 | Giridhar Gamang (Chief Minister); Raghunath Patnaik | Anantaram Majhi |
| Southern | Malkangiri | 0 | – | – |
| Southern | Nabarangpur | 1 | – | Parama Pujari |
| Southern | Nuapada | 1 | Jagannath Patnaik | – |
| Southern | Rayagada | 0 | – | – |
