= First Hemananda Biswal ministry =

Government of Odisha (1989 – 1990)

First Hemananda Biswal Patnaik ministry
- 20th Ministry of Orissa
- 1989 – 1990
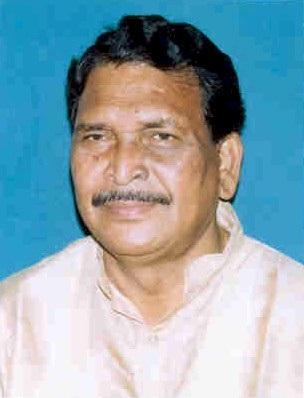
- Hemananda Biswal; Hon'ble Chief Minister of Orissa
- Date formed: 7 December 1989
- Date dissolved: 5 March 1990

People and organisations
- Governor: Saiyid Nurul Hasan; Yagya Dutt Sharma
- Chief Minister: Hemananda Biswal
- No. of ministers: 25
- Member parties: Indian National Congress
- Status in legislature: Majority
- Opposition party: Janata Party
- Opposition leader: Biju Patnaik

History
- Incoming formation: 9th Orissa Legislative Assembly
- Election: 1985 Assembly election
- Legislature term: 88 days
- Predecessor: Second Janaki Ballabh Patnaik ministry
- Successor: Second Biju Patnaik ministry

Hemananda Biswal was sworn in as the Chief minister of Orissa on 7th December 1989 for the first time.

== Brief history ==
Riding on the sympathy wave, after the death of Indira Gandhi, Chief Minister Janaki Patnaik was sworn in following Congress party win in 1985 Orissa Legislative Assembly election and continued till 1989.

Following poor performance of Congress party in the 1989 Lok Sabha elections, Shri Patnaik stepped down as CM taking moral responsibility. Subsequently, Shri Biswal along with 6 Cabinet Ministers, 15 Minister of State and 2 Deputy Minister were administered the oath of office and secrecy by Governor Saiyid Nurul Hasan.

Shri Biswal resigned on 5 March 1990 following Congress party's defeat in 1990 Orissa Legislative Assembly election.

== Council of Ministers ==
Source
Portfolio	Portrait	Name Constituency	Tenure		Party
Chief Minister; Home; General Administration; Planning & Coordination; Industries; Science & Technology; Works; Housing; Community Development & Rural Reconstruction; Other departments not allocated to any Minister.		Hemananda Biswal; MLA from Laikera	7 December 1989	5 March 1990	INC
Cabinet Minister
Commerce and Transport		Anupa Singh Deo; MLA from Khariar	7 December 1989	5 March 1990	INC
Revenue; Excise		Bhagabat Prasad Mohanty; MLA from Kendrapara	7 December 1989	5 March 1990	INC
Harijan & Tribal Welfare		Dambaru Majhi; MLA from Dabugam	7 December 1989	5 March 1990	INC
Finance; Law		Gangadhar Mohapatra; MLA from Brahmagiri	7 December 1989	5 March 1990	INC
Agriculture; Co-operation		Ras Behari Behera; MLA from Koksara	7 December 1989	5 March 1990	INC
Education & Youth Services		Sk. Matlub Ali; MLA from Mahanga	7 December 1989	5 March 1990	INC
Minister of State with Independent Charges
Information & Public Relations		Amarnath Pradhan; MLA from Athmallik	7 December 1989	5 March 1990	INC
Tourism; Sports & Culture		Bibhuti Bhusan Singh Mardaraj; MLA from Khandapara	7 December 1989	5 March 1990	INC
Irrigation & Power		Bhupinder Singh; MLA from Kesinga	7 December 1989	5 March 1990	INC
Urban Development		Dolagobinda Pradhan; MLA from Cuttack Sadar	7 December 1989	5 March 1990	INC
Housing; Labour & Employment		Gajadhar Majhi; MLA from Talsara	7 December 1989	5 March 1990	INC
Mines & Geology		Jayadev Jena; MLA from Anandapur	7 December 1989	5 March 1990	INC
Fisheries & Animal Husbandry		Mohan Nag; MLA from Bhatli	7 December 1989	5 March 1990	INC
Forest & Environment		Netrananda Mallick; MLA from Chandbali	7 December 1989	5 March 1990	INC
Health & Family Welfare		Sitakanta Mahapatra; MLA from Barchana	7 December 1989	5 March 1990	INC
Minister of State
Lift Irrigation		Amarnath Pradhan; MLA from Athmallik	7 December 1989	5 March 1990	INC
Planning & Coordination		Bibhuti Bhusan Singh Mardaraj; MLA from Khandapara	7 December 1989	5 March 1990	INC
Education & Youth Services		Frida Topno; MLA from Raghunathpali	7 December 1989	5 March 1990	INC
Industries		Jagannath Rout; MLA from Dhamnagar	7 December 1989	5 March 1990	INC
Science & Technology		Jayadev Jena; MLA from Anandapur	7 December 1989	5 March 1990	INC
Agriculture; Co-operation		Kartika Prasad Taria; MLA from Birmaharajpur	7 December 1989	5 March 1990	INC
Works		Prakash Chandra Debata; MLA from Melchhamunda	7 December 1989	5 March 1990	INC
Food & Civil Supplies		Raghab Parida; MLA from Aska	7 December 1989	5 March 1990	INC
Community Development & Rural Reconstruction		Saraswati Hembram; MLA from Kuliana	7 December 1989	5 March 1990	INC
Deputy Minister
Health & Family Welfare		Parama Pujari; MLA from Umarkote	7 December 1989	5 March 1990	INC
Harijan & Tribal Welfare; Labour & Employment		Judisthir Jena; MLA from Jaleswar	7 December 1989	5 March 1990	INC

== Demographics ==
Division	District	Ministers	Cabinet Ministers	Ministers of State / Deputy Ministers
Central	Cuttack	4	Sk. Matlub Ali; Bhagabat Prasad Mohanty	Dolagobinda Pradhan; Sitakanta Mahapatra
Central	Puri	2	Gangadhar Mohapatra	Bibhuti Bhusan Singh Mardaraj
Central	Balasore	3	–	Judisthir Jena; Netrananda Mallick; Jagannath Rout
Central	Mayurbhanj	1	–	Saraswati Hembram
Northern	Sambalpur	3	Hemananda Biswal (Chief Minister)	Prakash Chandra Debata; Mohan Nag
Northern	Sundergarh	2	–	Gajadhar Majhi; Frida Topno
Northern	Keonjhar	1	–	Jayadev Jena
Northern	Dhenkanal	1	–	Amarnath Pradhan
Northern	Balangir	1		Kartika Prasad Taria
Southern	Ganjam	1		Raghab Parida
Southern	Kalahandi	3	Ras Behari Behera; Anupa Singh Deo	Bhupinder Singh
Southern	Koraput	1	–	Parama Pujari
Southern	Phulbani	0	–	–
