= 1974 Orissa Legislative Assembly election =

State assembly election in India

- February 24, 1974

All 147 seats in the Orissa Legislative Assembly 74 seats needed for a majority
- Registered: 1,17,91,437 (▲8.86%)
- Turnout: 51.70% (▲8.31pp)

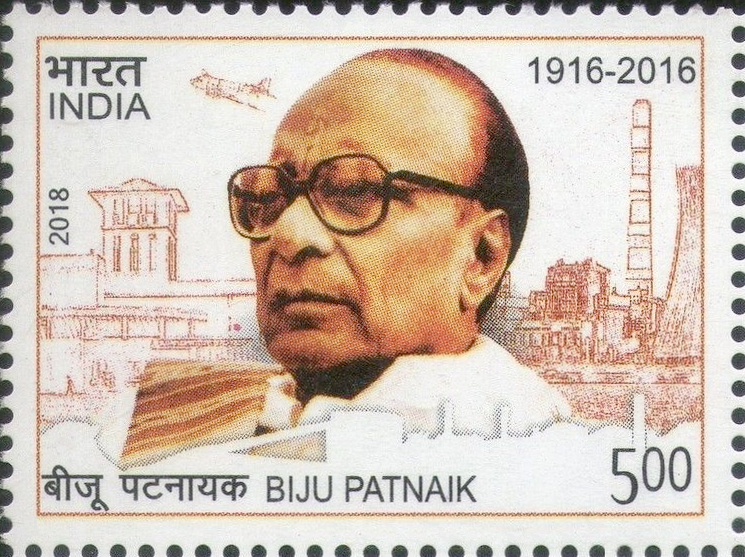
	Majority party	Minority party	Third party
			SWA
Leader	Nandini Satpathy	Biju Patnaik	Rajendra Narayan Singh Deo
Party	INC(R)	Utkal Congress	SWA
Leader's seat	Not contested	Rajanagar	Bolangir
Seats won	69	35	21
Seat change	▲18	▲2	▼15
popular vote	21,52,818	15,21,064	6,94,473
Percentage	37.44	26.45	12.08
Chief Minister before election
Nandini Satpathy
Indian National Congress (R)
Chief Minister
Nandini Satpathy
Indian National Congress (R)

Elections to the sixth Orissa Legislative Assembly were held 1974.

== Constituencies ==
The elections were held for 147 seats. A total of 722 candidates contested for these 147 seats.

== Political parties ==
Three national parties, Communist Party of India, Indian National Congress and Swatantra Party along with the state party Utkal Congress took part in the assembly election. Congress party emerged again as the winner by winning 50% of the seats with a vote share of 37.44%. Nandini Satpathy again become the Chief Minister of the state.

== Results ==
Source: Election Commission of India
Party				Popular vote			Seats		
Color	Flag	Name	Symbol	Votes	%	±pp	Contested	Won	+/−
		Indian National Congress (R)		2,152,818	37.44%	▲9.26	135	69	▲18
		Utkal Congress		1,521,064	26.45%	▲2.46	95	35	▲2
		Swatantra Party		694,473	12.08%	▼5.36	56	21	▼15
		Communist Party of India		279,738	4.87%	▲0.08	14	7	▲3
		Samyukta Socialist Party		101,789	1.77%	▲0.56	17	2	▲2
		Communist Party of India (Marxist)		67,600	1.18%	▼0.02	8	3	▲1
		Orissa Jana Congress		67,169	1.17%	▼3.99	42	1	Steady
		Jharkhand Party		34,786	0.60%	▼1.04	12	1	▼3
	-	Independents	-	750,818	13.06%	▲5.51	299	7	▲3
Total				-	-	-	-	146	-
Valid Votes				5,749,825	48.76				
Invalid Votes				346,895	-				
Total Votes polled / turnout				6,096,720	51.70				
Abstentation				5,694,717	-				
Total No. of Electors				11,791,437					

== Elected Members ==
District	AC. No.	Constituency	Winner Candidate	Party	
Mayurbhanj	1	Karanjia (ST)	Karunakar Naik		Indian National Congress
Mayurbhanj	2	Jashipur (ST)	Ghanshyam Hemram		Independent
Mayurbhanj	3	Bahalda (ST)	Sashi Bhusan Marndi		Independent
Mayurbhanj	4	Rairangpur (ST)	Arjun Majhi		Utkal Congress
Mayurbhanj	5	Bangriposi (ST)	Rudra Mohan Das		Communist Party of India
Mayurbhanj	6	Kuliana (ST)	Sarat Chandra Singh		Indian National Congress
Mayurbhanj	7	Baripada	Promod Chandra Bhanjdeo		Independent
Mayurbhanj	8	Baisinga (ST)	Kuanria Majhi		Indian National Congress
Mayurbhanj	9	Khunta (ST)	Ramesh Saren		Indian National Congress
Mayurbhanj	10	Udala (ST)	Ravaneswa Madhei		Indian National Congress
Baleshwar	11	Bhograi	Kartikeswar Patra		Indian National Congress
Baleshwar	12	Jaleswar	Gadadhar Giri		Samyukta Socialist Party
Baleshwar	13	Basta	Chintamani Jena		Indian National Congress
Baleshwar	14	Balasore	Arun Dey		Communist Party of India
Baleshwar	15	Soro	Jadunath Das Mahapatra		Indian National Congress
Baleshwar	16	Simulia	Sailen Mohapatra		Indian National Congress
Baleshwar	17	Nilgiri	Banamali Das		Communist Party of India (Marxist)
Baleshwar	18	Bhandaripokhari (SC)	Bairagi Jena		Utkal Congress
Baleshwar	19	Bhadrak	Jugal Kishore Pattanaik		Indian National Congress
Baleshwar	20	Dhamnagar	Hrudananda Mullick		Utkal Congress
Baleshwar	21	Chandbali (SC)	Manmohan Das		Indian National Congress
Baleshwar	22	Basudevpur	Jagabandhu Das		Indian National Congress
Cuttack	23	Sukinda	Sanatan Deo		Indian National Congress
Cuttack	24	Korai	Ashok Kumar Das		Utkal Congress
Cuttack	25	Jajpur (SC)	Jagannath Malik		Utkal Congress
Cuttack	26	Dharamsala	Banka Bihari Das		Indian National Congress
Cuttack	27	Barchana	Dusasan Jena		Communist Party of India
Cuttack	28	Bari-Derabisi	Prahlad Malik		Utkal Congress
Cuttack	29	Binjharpur (SC)	Baishmab Charan Malik		Indian National Congress
Cuttack	30	Aul	Sarat Kumar Deb		Swatantra Party
Cuttack	31	Patamundai (SC)	Biswanath Mallik		Indian National Congress
Cuttack	32	Rajnagar	Biju Patnaik		Utkal Congress
Cuttack	33	Kendrapara	Bed Prakash Agarwal		Utkal Congress
Cuttack	34	Patkura	Raj Kishore Nayak		Utkal Congress
Cuttack	35	Tirtol	Pratap Chandra Mohanty		Utkal Congress
Cuttack	36	Ersama	Lokanath Chowdhury		Communist Party of India
Cuttack	37	Balikuda	Basudeb Mohapatra		Indian National Congress
Cuttack	38	Jagatsinghpur (SC)	Laxman Mallick		Indian National Congress
Cuttack	39	Kissannagar	Batakrushna Jena		Utkal Congress
Cuttack	40	Mahanga	Shaik Matlub Ali		Indian National Congress
Cuttack	41	Salepur (SC)	Baidhar Behera		Indian National Congress
Cuttack	42	Gobindpur	Sudhansu Malini Ray		Indian National Congress
Cuttack	43	Cuttack Sadar	Trilochan Kanungo		Indian National Congress
Cuttack	44	Cuttack City	Srikanta Panda		Utkal Congress
Cuttack	45	Choudwar	Kanhu Charan Lenka		Indian National Congress
Cuttack	46	Banki	Jogesh Chanda Rout		Independent
Cuttack	47	Athgarh	Radhanath Rath		Independent
Cuttack	48	Baramba	Raja Saheb Trilochan Singh Deo		Swatantra Party
Puri	49	Balipatna (SC)	Gopinath Bhoi		Utkal Congress
Puri	50	Bhubaneswar	Harekrushna Mahtab		Utkal Congress
Puri	51	Jatni	Satyapriya Mohanty		Utkal Congress
Puri	52	Pipli	Bipin Bihari Dash		Indian National Congress
Puri	53	Nimapara (SC)	Nilamani Sitha		Indian National Congress
Puri	54	Kakatpur	Brudaban Patra		Indian National Congress
Puri	55	Satyabadi	Gangadhar Mahapatra		Indian National Congress
Puri	56	Puri	Brajamohan Mohanty		Indian National Congress
Puri	57	Brahmagiri	Siddheswar Panigrahi		Communist Party of India
Puri	58	Chilka	No Nomination filed		
Puri	59	Khurda	Benudhar Baliarsingh		Indian National Congress
Puri	60	Begunia	Satyanand Champatiray		Utkal Congress
Puri	61	Ranpur	Ramesh Chandra Panda		Communist Party of India (Marxist)
Puri	62	Nayagarh	Bhagabat Behera		Samyukta Socialist Party
Puri	63	Khandapara	Satyasundar Misra		Independent
Puri	64	Daspalla	Harihar Karana		Independent
Ganjam	65	Jaganathprasad (SC)	Batsa Naik		Indian National Congress
Ganjam	66	Bhanjanagar	Somnath Rath		Indian National Congress
Ganjam	67	Suruda	Sarat Chanda Panda		Indian National Congress
Ganjam	68	Aska	Harihar Das		Communist Party of India
Ganjam	69	Kabisuryanagar	Sadananda Mahanty		Communist Party of India
Ganjam	70	Kodala	Kanhu Charan Nayak		Indian National Congress
Ganjam	71	Khallikote	V. Sugnana Kumari Deo		Utkal Congress
Ganjam	72	Chatrapur	Daitari Behera		Utkal Congress
Ganjam	73	Hinjili	Brundaban Nayak		Utkal Congress
Ganjam	74	Gopalpur (SC)	Mohan Nayak		Indian National Congress
Ganjam	75	Berhampur	Binayak Acharya		Indian National Congress
Ganjam	76	Chikiti	Satchida Nandu Deo		Indian National Congress
Ganjam	77	Mohana	Udayanarayan Deb		Utkal Congress
Ganjam	78	Ramagiri (ST)	Chakradhar Paik		Utkal Congress
Ganjam	79	Parlakhemundi	Nalla Kurmanaikulu		Utkal Congress
Koraput	80	Gunupur (ST)	Bhagirathi Gamang		Indian National Congress
Koraput	81	Bissam-cuttack (ST)	Ulaka Dambarudhar		Indian National Congress
Koraput	82	Rayagada (ST)	Ulka Rama Chandra		Indian National Congress
Koraput	83	Lakshmipur (ST)	Ananta Ram Majhi		Indian National Congress
Koraput	84	Pottangi (ST)	Disari Sannu		Utkal Congress
Koraput	85	Koraput	Harish Chandra Baxipatra		Utkal Congress
Koraput	86	Malkangiri (SC)	Naka Kannaya		Utkal Congress
Koraput	87	Chitrakonda (ST)	Gangadhar Madi		Indian National Congress
Koraput	88	Kotpad (ST)	Basudeb Majhi		Indian National Congress
Koraput	89	Jeypore	Raghunath Patnaik		Indian National Congress
Koraput	90	Nowrangpur	Habibulla Khan		Swatantra Party
Koraput	91	Kodinga (ST)	Sombaru Majhi		Utkal Congress
Koraput	92	Dabugam (ST)	Syamoghomo Majhi		Swatantra Party
Koraput	93	Umarkote (ST)	Rabisingh Majhi		Utkal Congress
Kalahandi	94	Nawapara	Jagannath Pattanaik		Indian National Congress
Kalahandi	95	Khariar	Anupa Singh Deo		Utkal Congress
Kalahandi	96	Dharamgarh (SC)	Dayanidhi Naik		Swatantra Party
Kalahandi	97	Koksara	Chandrabhanu Singh Deo		Swatantra Party
Kalahandi	98	Junagarh	Udit Pratap Deo		Swatantra Party
Kalahandi	99	Bhawanipatna (SC)	Jagamohan Nayak		Swatantra Party
Kalahandi	100	Narla (ST)	Dhaneswar Majhi		Swatantra Party
Kalahandi	101	Kesinga	Sarat Chandra Singh Deo		Swatantra Party
Phulabani	102	Balliguda (ST)	Sahura Mallik		Indian National Congress
Phulabani	103	Udayagiri (ST)	Gopal Pradhan		Indian National Congress
Phulabani	104	Phulbani (SC)	Chandra Sekhar Behera		Indian National Congress
Phulabani	105	Boudh	Natabar Pradhan		Swatantra Party
Balangir	106	Titilagarh (SC)	Tapi Jal		Swatantra Party
Balangir	107	Kantabanji	Ramprasad Misra		Swatantra Party
Balangir	108	Patnagarh	Ainthu Sahoo		Swatantra Party
Balangir	109	Saintala	Krushna Chandra Panda		Swatantra Party
Balangir	110	Loisingha	Ananga Udaya Singh Deo		Swatantra Party
Balangir	111	Bolangir	Rajendra Narayan Singh Deo		Swatantra Party
Balangir	112	Sonepur (SC)	Daulat Bagh		Swatantra Party
Balangir	113	Binka	Radha Mohan Mishra		Swatantra Party
Balangir	114	Birmaharajpur	Hrushikesh Hota		Indian National Congress
Dhenkanal	115	Athmallik	Bhajaman Behera		Indian National Congress
Dhenkanal	116	Angul	Adwait Prasad Singh		Utkal Congress
Dhenkanal	117	Hindol (SC)	Bhagirathi Naik		Indian National Congress
Dhenkanal	118	Dhenkanal	Nandini Satpathy		Indian National Congress
Dhenkanal	119	Gondia	Sribatsa Nayak		Indian National Congress
Dhenkanal	120	Kamakhyanagar	Brahmananda Biswal		Indian National Congress
Dhenkanal	121	Pallahara	Narayan Sahu		Indian National Congress
Dhenkanal	122	Talcher (SC)	Brundaban Behera		Orissa Jana Congress
Sambalpur	123	Padampur	Krupasindhu Bhoi		Indian National Congress
Sambalpur	124	Melchhamunda	Prakash Chandra Debta		Indian National Congress
Sambalpur	125	Bijepur	Gananath Pradhan		Utkal Congress
Sambalpur	126	Bhatli (SC)	Mohan Nag		Indian National Congress
Sambalpur	127	Bargarh	Nabin Kumar Pradhan		Utkal Congress
Sambalpur	128	Sambalpur	Shri Ballav Panigrahi		Utkal Congress
Sambalpur	129	Brajarajnagar	Prasanna Kumar Panda		Communist Party of India
Sambalpur	130	Jharsuguda	Sairendhri Nayak		Indian National Congress
Sambalpur	131	Laikera (ST)	Hemanand Biswal		Indian National Congress
Sambalpur	132	Kuchinda (ST)	Jagateswar Mirdha		Indian National Congress
Sambalpur	133	Rairakhol (SC)	Basanta Kumar Mohananda		Utkal Congress
Sambalpur	134	Deogarh	Tribhuban Deb		Swatantra Party
Sundergarh	135	Sundargarh	Dibyalochan Sekhar Deo		Indian National Congress
Sundergarh	136	Talsara (ST)	Premananda Kalo		Indian National Congress
Sundergarh	137	Rajgangpur (ST)	Christopher Ekka		Indian National Congress
Sundergarh	138	Biramitrapur (ST)	Christodas Luhgun		Jharkhand Party
Sundergarh	139	Rourkela	Dhananjaya Mohanty		Indian National Congress
Sundergarh	140	Raghunathpali (ST)	Agapit Lakra		Indian National Congress
Sundergarh	141	Bonai (ST)	Benudhar Naik		Indian National Congress
Keonjhar	142	Champua (ST)	Guru Charan Naik		Indian National Congress
Keonjhar	143	Patna	Maheswar Majhi		Utkal Congress
Keonjhar	144	Keonjhar (ST)	Govinda Munda		Swatantra Party
Keonjhar	145	Telkoi (ST)	Niladri Naik		Utkal Congress
Keonjhar	146	Ramchandrapur	Murlidhar Kuanr		Utkal Congress
Keonjhar	147	Anandapur (SC)	Bhubananda Jena		Indian National Congress

== See also ==
- 1974 elections in India
- 1971 Orissa Legislative Assembly election
- 1977 Orissa Legislative Assembly election
