= First Naveen Patnaik ministry =

Government of Orissa (2000 – 2004)

- 25th Ministry of Orissa
- 2000 – 2004
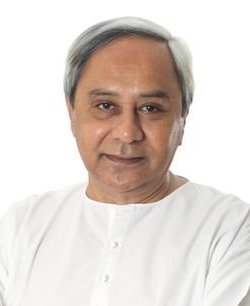
- Naveen Patnaik; Hon'ble Chief Minister of Orissa
- Date formed: 5 March 2000
- Date dissolved: 15 May 2004

People and organisations
- Governor: M. M. Rajendran
- Chief Minister: Naveen Patnaik
- No. of ministers: 25
- Member parties: National Democratic Alliance; Biju Janata Dal; Bharatiya Janata Party
- Status in legislature: Majority
- Opposition party: Indian National Congress
- Opposition leader: Ramakanta Mishra

History
- Incoming formation: 12th Orissa Legislative Assembly
- Outgoing formation: 11th Orissa Legislative Assembly
- Election: 2000 Assembly election
- Legislature terms: 4 years, 71 days
- Predecessor: Second Hemananda Biswal ministry
- Successor: Second Naveen Patnaik ministry

Naveen Patnaik was elected as the chief minister of Orissa for the first time in 2000 after NDA secured a landslide victory in the 2000 Orissa Legislative Assembly election. The elections were held in February 2000 in two phases. NDA secured 107 seats out of 147 in the twelfth Orissa Legislative Assembly. BJD secured 69 seats while BJP secured 38 seats.

== Brief history ==
Due to poor handling of 1999 Orissa cyclone and rise in corruption & criminal cases etc. led to rise of unpopularity of Congress, which eventually led to their dismissal performance in 2000 election.

Chief Minister Naveen Patnaik along with 14 Cabinet Ministers, 6 Minister of State with Independent Charges and 4 Minister of State were administered the oath of office and secrecy by Governor M. M. Rajendran at the Raj Bhavan, Bhubaneswar on 5 March 2000. The BJD had the larger share of representation in the ministry with 16 ministers including the Chief Minister while the BJP had 9.

Cabinet reshuffle took place on 6 August 2002 with induction of 8 new ministers.

Assembly was dissolved early almost a year ahead & election were called in line with 2004 Indian general election. NDA lost the general election but won 2004 Orissa Assembly election. Shri Patnaik resigned on 15 May 2004 paving way for new govt.

== Council of Ministers ==
Source
Portfolio	Portrait	Name Constituency	Tenure		Party
Chief Minister; Home; General Administration; Agriculture; Other departments not allocated to any Minister.		Naveen Patnaik; MLA from Hinjili	5 March 2000	15 May 2004	BJD
Water Resources; Information Technology		Naveen Patnaik; MLA from Hinjili	5 March 2000	6 August 2002	BJD
Works; Housing; Parliamentary Affairs; Health & Family Welfare; Women & Child Development; Rural Development; Higher Education		Naveen Patnaik; MLA from Hinjili	9 July 2001	6 August 2002	BJD
School & Mass Education		Naveen Patnaik; MLA from Hinjili	3 June 2002	6 August 2002	BJD
Finance; Planning & Coordination		Naveen Patnaik; MLA from Hinjili	6 August 2002	15 May 2004	BJD
Cabinet Minister
Excise		Ananda Acharya; MLA from Bargarh	5 March 2000	15 May 2004	BJD
Housing; Parliamentary Affairs		Nalinikanta Mohanty; MLA from Rajanagar	5 March 2000	9 July 2001	BJD
Works		Nalinikanta Mohanty; MLA from Rajanagar	5 March 2000	9 July 2001	BJD
Works		Kalindi Behera; MLA from Salepur	6 August 2002	15 May 2004	BJD
Finance; Planning & Coordination		Ram Krushna Patnaik; MLA from Kodala	5 March 2000	6 August 2002	BJD
Health & Family Welfare; Women & Child Development		Kamala Das; MLA from Bhograi	5 March 2000	9 July 2001	BJD
Health & Family Welfare; Women & Child Development		Prafulla Chandra Ghadei; MLA from Sukinda	6 August 2002	15 May 2004	BJD
Forest; Environment		Adwait Prasad Singh; MLA from Angul	5 March 2000	6 August 2002	BJD
Panchayati Raj		Surendra Nath Naik; MLA from Kakatpur	5 March 2000	6 August 2002	BJD
Panchayati Raj		Damodar Rout; MLA from Ersama	6 August 2002	15 May 2004	BJD
Information & Public Relations; Culture		Damodar Rout; MLA from Ersama	6 August 2002	15 May 2004	BJD
School & Mass Education		Bhagabat Behera; MLA from Nayagarh	5 March 2000	3 June 2002	BJD
School & Mass Education		Surendra Nath Naik; MLA from Kakatpur	6 August 2002	15 May 2004	BJD
Steel & Mines		Ananga Udaya Singh Deo; MLA from Bolangir	5 March 2000	15 May 2004	BJD
Information Technology; Tourism		Ananga Udaya Singh Deo; MLA from Bolangir	6 August 2002	15 May 2004	BJD
Energy		Ananga Udaya Singh Deo; MLA from Bolangir	5 March 2000	6 August 2002	BJD
Energy		Surjya Narayan Patro; MLA from Mohana	6 August 2002	15 May 2004	BJD
Science & Technology; Environment		Surjya Narayan Patro; MLA from Mohana	6 August 2002	15 May 2004	BJD
Schedule Tribes & Schedule Castes Development; Minorities & Backward Classes Welfare		Mangala Kisan; MLA from Rajgangpur	5 March 2000	6 August 2002	BJD
Schedule Tribes & Schedule Castes Development; Minorities & Backward Classes Welfare		Kalindi Behera; MLA from Salipur	6 August 2002	15 May 2004	BJD
Water Resources		Mangala Kisan; MLA from Rajgangpur	6 August 2002	15 May 2004	BJD
Revenue; Law		Biswabhusan Harichandan; MLA from Bhubaneswar	5 March 2000	15 May 2004	BJP
Fisheries & Animal Resources Development		Biswabhusan Harichandan; MLA from Bhubaneswar	5 March 2000	6 August 2002	BJP
Food Supplies & Consumer Welfare		Bed Prakash Agarwal; MLA from Kendrapara	5 March 2000	15 May 2004	BJP
Public Enterprises		Bed Prakash Agarwal; MLA from Kendrapara	5 March 2000	6 August 2002	BJP
Rural Development		Bed Prakash Agarwal; MLA from Kendrapara	6 August 2002	15 May 2004	BJP
Public Grievances & Pension Administration; Urban Development		Samir Dey; MLA from Cuttack City	5 March 2000	15 May 2004	BJP
Industries		Kanak Vardhan Singh Deo; MLA from Patnagarh	5 March 2000	15 May 2004	BJP
Public Enterprises		Kanak Vardhan Singh Deo; MLA from Patnagarh	6 August 2002	15 May 2004	BJP
Co-operation		Arabinda Dhali; MLA from Malkangiri	5 March 2000	15 May 2004	BJP
Textiles & Handlooms		Arabinda Dhali; MLA from Malkangiri	5 March 2000	6 August 2002	BJP
Commerce and Transport		Arabinda Dhali; MLA from Malkangiri	6 August 2002	15 May 2004	BJP
Minister of State with Independent Charges
Sports & Youth Services		Ranendra Pratap Swain; MLA from Athagarh	5 March 2000	15 May 2004	BJD
Science & Technology		Ranendra Pratap Swain; MLA from Athagarh	5 March 2000	6 August 2002	BJD
Housing		Ranendra Pratap Swain; MLA from Athagarh	6 August 2002	15 May 2004	BJD
Tourism; Culture		Bijayshree Routray; MLA from Basudevpur	5 March 2000	6 August 2002	BJD
Forest		Bijayshree Routray; MLA from Basudevpur	6 August 2002	15 May 2004	BJD
Information & Public Relations		Duryodhan Majhi; MLA from Khariar	5 March 2000	6 August 2002	BJD
Parliamentary Affairs		Panchanan Kanungo; MLA from Gobindpur	6 August 2002	15 May 2004	BJD
Commerce and Transport		Droupadi Murmu; MLA from Rairangpur	5 March 2000	6 August 2002	BJP
Fisheries & Animal Resources Development		Droupadi Murmu; MLA from Rairangpur	6 August 2002	15 May 2004	BJP
Labour & Employment		Bimbadhar Kuanr; MLA from Bhatli	5 March 2000	6 August 2002	BJP
Labour & Employment		Himansu Sekhar Meher; MLA from Junagarh	6 August 2002	15 May 2004	BJP
Textiles & Handlooms		Himansu Sekhar Meher; MLA from Junagarh	6 August 2002	15 May 2004	BJP
Rural Development		Prashanta Nanda; MLA from Begunia	5 March 2000	9 July 2001	BJP
Higher Education		Prashanta Nanda; MLA from Begunia	5 March 2000	9 July 2001	BJP
Higher Education		Bimbadhar Kuanr; MLA from Bhatli	6 August 2002	15 May 2004	BJP
Minister of State
Food Supplies & Consumer Welfare		Rabi Narayan Nanda; MLA from Jeypore	5 March 2000	6 August 2002	BJD
Water Resources		Rabi Narayan Nanda; MLA from Jeypore	6 August 2002	15 May 2004	BJD
Health & Family Welfare		Debi Prasad Mishra; MLA from Baramba	5 March 2000	6 August 2002	BJD
Agriculture		Amar Prasad Satpathy; MLA from Barchana	5 March 2000	6 August 2002	BJD
Finance		Panchanan Kanungo; MLA from Gobindpur	6 August 2002	15 May 2004	BJD
Women & Child Development		Bishnu Priya Behera; MLA from Phulbani	6 August 2002	15 May 2004	BJD
Schedule Tribes & Schedule Castes Development; Minorities & Backward Classes Welfare		Balabhadra Majhi; MLA from Narla	6 August 2002	15 May 2004	BJD
Planning & Coordination		Golak Bihari Naik; MLA from Khunta	5 March 2000	6 August 2002	BJP
Public Grievances & Pension Administration		Golak Bihari Naik; MLA from Khunta	6 August 2002	15 May 2004	BJP

== Demographics ==
Division	District	Ministers	Cabinet Ministers	Ministers of State
Northern	Angul	1	Adwait Prasad Singh	
Northern	Balangir	2	Ananga Udaya Singh Deo; Kanak Vardhan Singh Deo	–
Northern	Bargarh	2	Ananda Acharya	Bimbadhar Kuanr
Northern	Dhenkanal	0	–	–
Northern	Deogarh	0	–	–
Northern	Jharsuguda	0	–	–
Northern	Keonjhar	0	–	–
Northern	Subarnapur	0	–	–
Northern	Sambalpur	0	–	–
Northern	Sundergarh	1	Mangala Kisan	–
Central	Balasore	1	Kamala Das	–
Central	Bhadrak	1	–	Bijayshree Routray
Central	Cuttack	5	Kalindi Behera; Samir Dey	Ranendra Pratap Swain; Panchanan Kanungo; Debi Prasad Mishra
Central	Jagatsinghpur	2	Damodar Rout; Bishnu Charan Das	–
Central	Jajpur	2	Prafulla Chandra Ghadei	Amar Prasad Satpathy
Central	Khorda	2	Biswabhusan Harichandan	Prashanta Nanda
Central	Kendrapara	2	Bed Prakash Agarwal; Nalinikanta Mohanty	–
Central	Mayurbhanj	2	–	Droupadi Murmu; Golak Bihari Naik
Central	Nayagarh	1	Bhagabat Behera	–
Central	Puri	1	Surendra Nath Naik	–
Southern	Boudh	0	–	–
Southern	Gajapati	0	–	–
Southern	Ganjam	3	Naveen Patnaik (Chief Minister); Ram Krushna Patnaik; Surjya Narayan Patro	–
Southern	Kalahandi	2	–	Balabhadra Majhi; Himansu Sekhar Meher
Southern	Kandhamal	1	–	Bishnu Priya Behera
Southern	Koraput	0	–	–
Southern	Malkangiri	1	Arabinda Dhali	–
Southern	Nabarangpur	0	–	–
Southern	Nuapada	1	Duryodhan Majhi	–
Southern	Rayagada	1	–	Rabi Narayan Nanda
