= Badri Narayan Patra =

Indian politician

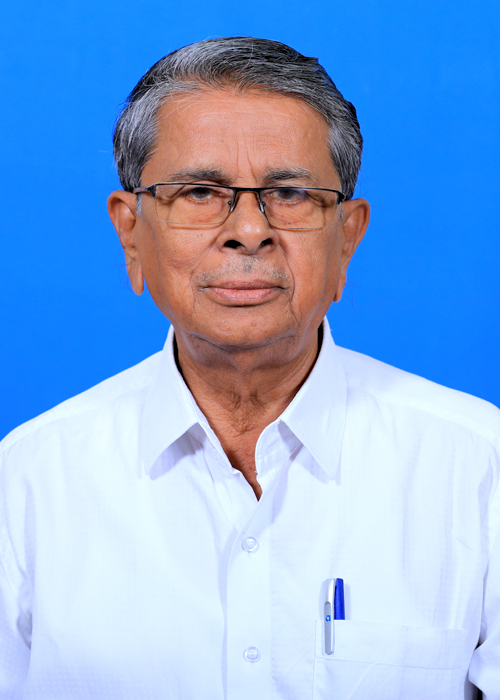

Member of Odisha Legislative Assembly
- Incumbent
- Assumed office 19 May 2009
- Preceded by: Constituency established
- Constituency: Ghasipura
- In office 2000–2004
- Preceded by: Niranjan Patnaik
- Succeeded by: Niranjan Patnaik
- Constituency: Ramachandrapur
- In office 1990–1995
- Preceded by: Niranjan Patnaik
- Succeeded by: Niranjan Patnaik
- Constituency: Ramachandrapur

Personal details
- Born: 14 November 1943 (age 82) Ghasipura, Odisha, India
- Party: Biju Janta Dal
- Education: Utkal University

Badri Narayan Patra (born 14 November 1943) is a politician from Odisha, India. He is a six time MLA who represented the Ghasipura Assembly constituency since 2009 for four terms. Earlier, he was the MLA of Ramachandrapur constituency.

== Early life ==
Patra formerly was a lecturer in economics. Former chief minister late Biju Patnaik brought him to politics.

== Career ==
Patra became an MLA for the first time winning the 1990 Odisha Legislative Assembly election from Ramchandrapur Assembly constituency representing Janata Dal. He regained the seat in the 2000 Odisha Legislative Assembly election as an independent candidate for the same seat.

Later, he shifted to Ghasipura Assembly constituency and won four consecutive terms in 2009, 2014, 2019 and 2024.

He was credited with developing Ghasipura and Keonjhar districts during his ministry with road connectivity, electrification, drinking water project and a river bridge.
