= Bimbadhar Kuanr =

Indian politician

Minister of Higher Education Government of Odisha
- In office 6 August 2002 – 16 May 2004
- Chief Minister: Naveen Patnaik
- Preceded by: Prasanta Nanda(BJP)
- Succeeded by: Samir Dey(BJP)

Minister of Labour & Employment Government of Odisha
- In office 5 March 2000 – 6 August 2002
- Chief Minister: Naveen Patnaik
- Preceded by: Durga Shankar Patnaik (Congress)
- Succeeded by: Himansu Sekhar Meher (BJP)

Member of Odisha Legislative Assembly
- In office 2000–2009
- Preceded by: Mohan Nag
- Succeeded by: Susanta Singh
- Constituency: Bhatli (SC)
- In office 1977–1980
- Preceded by: Mohan Nag
- Succeeded by: Mohan Nag
- Constituency: Bhatli (SC)

President of Bharatiya Janata Party, Odisha
- In office 1993–1996
- Preceded by: Debendra Pradhan
- Succeeded by: Debendra Pradhan

Personal details
- Born: 1 August 1949 (age 76)
- Party: Bharatiya Janata Party (2024-present) (till 2009)
- Other party: Biju Janata Dal (2009-24) Janata Party (1974-88)
- Spouse: Khirabdhee Tanaya Kuanr
- Children: 3 sons, 2 daughters
- Parent: Manabodh Kuanr (father)
- Education: Bachelor of Arts; Bachelor of Laws
- Profession: Advocate, Politician

Bimbadhar Kuanr(ଓଡ଼ିଆ : ବିମ୍ବାଧର କୁଅଁର) is an Indian politician from Bharatiya Janata Party, Odisha who had served as the Minister of Labour in the First Naveen Patnaik ministry from 2000 to 2002 and later as Minister of Higher Education from 2002 to 2004. He had represented Bhatli Assembly constituency thrice - 1977, 2000 & 2004. He had quit the BJP in 2009 to join BJD. 10 years later, he quit the BJD and re-joined BJP.
