= Bibhuti Bhusan Balabantaray =

Indian politician

Member of Odisha Legislative Assembly
- Incumbent
- Assumed office 4 June 2024
- Preceded by: Suresh Kumar Routray
- Constituency: Jatani

Personal details
- Party: Biju Janata Dal
- Profession: Politician

Bibhuti Bhusan Balabantaray is an Indian politician who was elected to the Odisha Legislative Assembly from Jatani as a member of the Biju Janata Dal.
