= Himansu Sekhar Meher =

Indian politician

Minister of Textile & Handloom Government of Odisha
- In office 6 August 2002 – 16 May 2004
- Chief Minister: Naveen Patnaik
- Preceded by: Arabinda Dhali
- Succeeded by: Golak Bihari Naik

Minister of Labour & Employment Government of Odisha
- In office 6 August 2002 – 16 May 2004
- Chief Minister: Naveen Patnaik
- Preceded by: Bimbadhar Kuanr
- Succeeded by: Pradipta Kumar Naik

Member of Odisha Legislative Assembly
- In office 1998–2009
- Preceded by: Bikram Keshari Deo
- Succeeded by: Gobardhan Dash
- Constituency: Junagarh

Personal details
- Born: 27 August 1956 (age 69)
- Party: Bharatiya Janata Party
- Spouse: Ratna Prava Meher
- Children: 2 sons, 1 daughter
- Parent: Lambodar Meher (father)
- Education: Bachelor of Arts; Bachelor of Laws
- Profession: Agriculturist, Politician

Himansu Sekhar Meher is an Indian politician from the Bharatiya Janata Party, Odisha. He served as the Minister of Textiles & Handlooms in the First Naveen Patnaik ministry from 2002 to 2004. He had represented Junagarh in the Odisha Legislative Assembly from 1998 to 2009. He stood third in the 2009 state election from Junagarh losing out to Gobardhan Dash of the Congress.
