= Rabindra Kumar Sethy =

Indian politician

Minister of State for Co-operatives: Government of Odisha
- In office 21 March 1995 – 17 February 1999

Member of Odisha Legislative Assembly
- In office 1995–2000
- Preceded by: Benudhara Sethy
- Succeeded by: Govinda Chandra Sethi
- Constituency: Nimapara
- In office 1980–1990
- Preceded by: Baidhar Mallick
- Succeeded by: Benudhara Sethy
- Constituency: Nimapara

Personal details
- Born: 10 October 1954 (age 71)
- Political party: Indian National Congress
- Spouse: Bijaylaxmi Sethy
- Children: 2
- Education: PhD, MA, BA, LLB
- Alma mater: Utkal University

Rabindra Kumar Sethy (born 10 October 1954) is an Indian politician and a veteran leader in the Indian National Congress. He was the Minister of State for Co-operatives from 1995 to 1999 and a member of the Odisha Legislative Assembly, elected three times from Nimapara. He has a doctorate and is an alumnus of Utkal University.
