= Jayadev Jena =

Indian politician from Odisha

President Odisha Pradesh Congress Committee
- In office 13 May 2013 – 15 December 2014
- Preceded by: Niranjan Patnaik
- Succeeded by: Prasad Kumar Harichandan
- In office 26 June 2004 – 28 January 2009
- Preceded by: Janaki Ballabh Patnaik
- Succeeded by: Kamakhya Prasad Singh Deo

Member of the Odisha Legislative Assembly
- In office 2004 – 2009
- Preceded by: Mayadhar Jena
- Succeeded by: Bhagirathi Sethy
- Constituency: Anandapur
- In office 1995 – 2000
- Preceded by: Dasarathi Jena
- Succeeded by: Mayadhar Jena
- Constituency: Anandapur
- In office 1980 – 1990
- Preceded by: Makara Sethi
- Succeeded by: Dasarathi Jena
- Constituency: Anandapur

Personal details
- Born: 10 March 1951 (age 75)
- Party: Indian National Congress

Jayadev Jena (born 10 March 1951) is an Indian politician from Odisha and a former member of Odisha Legislative Assembly from Anandapur constituency. He is a member of the Indian National Congress.
