= Daitari Behera =

Indian politician (1938–2020)

Member: 11th Odisha Legislative Assembly
- In office 1995–2000
- Preceded by: Parsuram Panda
- Succeeded by: Rama Chandra Panda
- Constituency: Chhatrapur

Member: 6th Odisha Legislative Assembly
- In office 1974–1977
- Preceded by: Lakshman Mahapatra
- Succeeded by: Biswanath Sahu
- Constituency: Chhatrapur

Personal details
- Born: 1 July 1938
- Died: 2 January 2020 (aged 81)
- Party: Indian National Congress
- Other political affiliations: Utkal Congress

Daitari Behera (1 July 1938 – 2 January 2020) was an Indian politician from Odisha belonging to Indian National Congress. He was elected as a legislator of the Odisha Legislative Assembly two times.

== Biography ==
Behera was born on 1 July 1938. He was elected as a member of the Odisha Legislative Assembly from Chhatrapur in 1974. He was also elected from this constituency in 1995.

Behera died on the 2nd of January, 2020, at the age of 81.
