= Anjana Mishra rape case =

Infamous rape case in India

Anjana Mishra rape case was a high-profile rape case that occurred in state of Orissa (India) in 1999. Anjana Mishra, ex-wife of an Indian Forest Service officer Subash Chandra Mishra, was raped on 9 January 1999. The case had created a furore in the State with Anjana accusing the then Chief Minister J. B. Patnaik and his friend former Advocate-General of Odisha Indrajit Ray of having played a role in the incident. The rape case spoiled the party's image. The party president Sonia Gandhi replaced the Chief Minister by Giridhar Gamang.

The car in which Anjana and her journalist friend were travelling on 9 January 1999 was intercepted at a desolate place near Barang on the outskirts of Cuttack by the three accused and she was gang-raped in front of her friend. Two of the culprits were arrested on 26 January 1999, and remanded to judicial custody, while the 3rd accused, Biban Biswal, after 22 years on the run, was arrested by the Odisha police on 22 February 2021 from Pune in Maharashtra. The Central Bureau of Investigation (CBI) took up the case after the Orissa High Court ordered the investigating agency on 26 February 1999, to probe the case. The CBI submitted its charge-sheet on 5 May 1999.

After a long battle, Anjana Mishra has won her case. In a judgment delivered on 29 April 2002 the District and Sessions Judge of Khurda, Orissa, sentenced two of the three accused persons in the case to life imprisonment and a fine of Rs.5,000 each. Judge Mahendra Nath Patnaik convicted Pradip Sahoo and Direndra Mohanty on charges of sexually assaulting Anjana while she was travelling in a car from Cuttack to Bhubaneswar along with a friend on 9 January 1999. The third accused, Biban Biswal, managed to evade arrest for 22 years. On 22 February 2021, the prime accused Biban Biswal was arrested from Pune by an operation called- ‘Silent Viper’ by a group of Odisha police led by the Commissioner of Police Dr. Sudhansu Sarangi. On the judgment Anjana Mishra said that she was still "depressed" as the investigating agency had not made any effort to arrest Biswal, who, she alleged held the key to unravelling the "conspiracy" behind the gang rape.

In 2023, Anjana Mishra issued a legal notice to the makers of the web series "Barang 1999" on the OTT platform Kanccha Lanka allegedly based on her real life. She accused that the makers of the show hadn't sought her consent in publishing the series. Through her lawyer, she threatened the makers of the show to take down the series from their platforms or else she will be forced to move to the court.

== Earlier attempted rape ==
On 12 July 1997, Anjana formally complained against Ray by writing to the Chief Minister stating that on 11 July Ray invited her on to his office-cum-residence in Cuttack, took her to his bedroom on the pretext of receiving a confidential call, and attempted to rape her. As no action was taken, representatives of several women's organisations met the Chief Minister who suggested a compromise deal. This was rejected by Anjana. She filed a first information report with the Cantonment police station in Cuttack on 19 July 1997. Anjana also accused the Chief Minister of shielding Ray. Ray had to quit the post following a public outcry and the case was taken up by the CBI. The CBI Designated Court sentenced Ray to three years' rigorous imprisonment in February 2000, charging him with attempted rape.
