= Ripunath Seth =

Indian politician (1958–2022)

Member of the Odisha Legislative Assembly
- In office 15 March 1995 – 29 February 2000
- Preceded by: Kishorimani Singh
- Succeeded by: Ashok Kumar Panigrahy
- Constituency: Bijepur

Personal details
- Born: 27 October 1958
- Died: 27 March 2022 (aged 63) Barapali, India
- Party: INC

Ripunath Seth (Odia: ରିପୁନାଥ ସେଠ; 27 October 1958 – 27 March 2022) was an Indian politician. A member of the Indian National Congress, he served in the Odisha Legislative Assembly from 1995 to 2000. He died in Barapali on 27 March 2022 at the age of 63.
