= Jagannath Rout =

Indian politician (1942–2020)

Industry Minister of the Government of Odisha
- In office 7 December 1989 – 3 March 1990

Health and Family Welfare Minister of the Government of Odisha
- In office 21 March 1995 – 24 August 1998

Urban Development Minister of the Government of Odisha
- In office 24 August 1998 – 17 February 1999

Odisha Legislative Assembly
- In office 9 June 1980 – 3 March 1990
- Preceded by: Hrudananda Mallik
- Succeeded by: Hrudananda Mallik
- Constituency: Dhamnagar
- In office 15 March 1995 – 16 March 1999
- Preceded by: Hrudananda Mallik
- Succeeded by: Manas Ranjan Mallik
- Constituency: Dhamnagar

Personal details
- Born: 13 November 1942
- Died: 24 January 2020 (aged 77)
- Party: Indian National Congress

Jagannath Rout (13 November 1942 – 24 January 2020) was an Indian politician from Odisha belonging to Indian National Congress. He was a legislator of the Odisha Legislative Assembly. He also served as a minister of the Government of Odisha.

== Biography ==
Rout was born on 13 November 1942. He was elected as a legislator of the Odisha Legislative Assembly from Dhamnagar in 1980, 1985 and 1995. He resigned from his legislator post on 16 March 1999.

Rout also served as a minister of the Government of Odisha. He served as the Industry Minister 7 December 1989 to 3 March 1990, Health and Family Welfare Minister from 21 March 1995 to 14 August 1998 and Urban Development Minister from 24 August 1998 to 17 February 1999.

Rout died of cardiac arrest on 24 January 2020 at the age of 77.
