= Khunta Assembly constituency =

Former constituency of the Odisha Legislative Assembly

Coordinates: 21.71°N 86.63°E

Khunta
- Former constituency for the Odisha Legislative Assembly

Constituency details
- Country: India
- Region: East India
- State: Odisha
- District: Mayurbhanj
- Lok Sabha constituency: Mayurbhanj
- Established: 1951
- Abolished: 2008
- Reservation: ST

Khunta was an Assembly constituency from Mayurbhanj district of Odisha. It was established in 1951 and abolished in 1956. It was revived in 1961 and abolished in 2008. After 2008 delimitation, It was subsumed by the Baripada Assembly constituency. This constituency was reserved for Schedule Tribes.

The extent of Khunta constituency comprised Khunta police station of Kaptipada sub-division, and Similipal and Kuliana police stations of Sadar sub-division.

== Members of the Legislative Assembly ==
Vote share of Winning candidate
2004	41.37%
2000	39.61%
1995	32.29%
1990	49.13%
1985	47.65%
1980	59.00%
1977	44.93%
1974	53.86%
1971	26.43%
1967	27.71%
1961	40.87%
1951	53.47%

Between 1951 & 2008, 12 elections were held.

List of members elected from Khunta constituency are:

Year	Member	Party
1951	Shakilla Sharen	Socialist Party
1957-1961: Constituency didn't exist
1961	Prasanna Kumar Dash	Praja Socialist Party
1967	Harachand Hansda	Praja Socialist Party
1971	Bira Bhadra Singh	Utkal Congress
1974	Ramesh Soren	Indian National Congress
1977	Ramesh Soren	Indian National Congress
1980	Ramesh Soren	Indian National Congress (I)
1985	Biram Murmu	Indian National Congress
1990	Birabhadra Singh	Janata Dal
1995	Saraswati Hembram	Indian National Congress
2000	Golak Bihari Naik	Bharatiya Janata Party
2004	Golak Bihari Naik	Bharatiya Janata Party

== Election results ==
=== 1951 ===
1952 Orissa Legislative Assembly election: Khunta
Party	Candidate	Votes	%	±%
Socialist Party (India)	Shakilla Sharen	7,985	53.47%	
INC	Dhyan Chandra Tudu	6,949	46.53%	
Turnout		14,934	30.71%	
Registered electors		48,625		
Margin of victory		1,036	6.94%	Steady
Socialist Party (India) win (new seat)				
