= Jatani Assembly constituency =

Constituency of the Odisha legislative assembly in India

Coordinates: 20.17°N 85.71°E

Jatani
- Constituency No. 115 for the Odisha Legislative Assembly
- Jatani Assembly constituency in Khordha district

Constituency details
- Country: India
- Region: East India
- State: Odisha
- Division: Central Division
- District: Khordha
- Lok Sabha constituency: Bhubaneswar
- Established: 1974
- Total electors: 2,47,101 (Note: as on 2024) (Note: as data published by election commission)
- Reservation: None

Member of Legislative Assembly
- 17th Odisha Legislative Assembly
- Incumbent Bibhuti Bhusan Balabantaray
- Party: Biju Janata Dal
- Elected year: 2024

Jatani is a Vidhan Sabha constituency of Khordha district, Odisha, India.

This constituency includes Jatani, Jatani block and 6 Gram panchayats (Gadahaladia, Keranga, Malipur, Tangiapada, Pubusahi and Nalipada-Arjunpur) of Khurda block and 10 GPs (Padhanasahi, Chandaka, Darutheng, Andharua, Paikerapur, Mendhasal, Tamando, Nanput, Kantabad and Ranasinghpur) of Bhubaneswar block.

== Elected members ==
Vote share of winning candidates
2024	39.06%
2019	42.94%
2014	41.92%
2009	47.85%
2004	49.59%
2000	46.98%
1995	49.24%
1990	53.49%
1985	46.56%
1980	61.96%
1977	51.39%

Since its formation in 1974, 12 elections were held till date.

List of members elected from Jatani constituency are:

Year	Member	Party
2024	Bibhuti Bhusan Balabantaray	Biju Janata Dal
2019	Suresh Kumar Routray	Indian National Congress
2014	Bhagirathi Badajena	Biju Janata Dal
2009	Bibhuti Bhusan Balabantaray	Biju Janata Dal
2004	Sarat Chandra Paikray	Biju Janata Dal
2000	Suresh Kumar Routray	Indian National Congress
1995	Suresh Kumar Routray	Indian National Congress
1990	Sarat Chandra Paikray	Janata Dal
1985	Suresh Kumar Routray	Indian National Congress
1980	Suresh Kumar Routray	Indian National Congress (I)
1977	Suresh Kumar Routray	Janata Party
1974	Satyapriya Mohanty	Utkal Congress

== Election results ==
=== 2024 ===
Voting were held on 25th May 2024 in 3rd phase of Odisha Assembly Election & 6th phase of Indian General Election. Counting of votes was on 4th June 2024. In 2024 election, Biju Janata Dal candidate Bibhuti Bhusan Balabantaray defeated Bharatiya Janata Party candidate Biswaranjan Badajena by a margin of 25,221 votes.

2024 Odisha Vidhan Sabha Election, Jatani
Party	Candidate	Votes	%	±%
BJD	Bibhuti Bhusan Balabantaray	68,162	39.06	▲0.82
BJP	Biswaranjan Badajena	42,941	24.61	▲8.24
INC	Santosh Kumar Jena	42,629	24.43	▼18.51
NOTA	None of the above	1,449	0.83	▲0.03
Majority		25,221	14.45	
Turnout		1,74,518	70.63	
BJD gain from INC				

=== 2019 ===
In 2019 election, Indian National Congress candidate Suresh Kumar Routray defeated Biju Janata Dal candidate Bibhuti Bhusan Balabantaray by a margin of 7,522 votes.

2019 Vidhan Sabha Election, Jatani
Party	Candidate	Votes	%	±%
INC	Suresh Kumar Routray	68,841	42.94	▲4.97
BJD	Bibhuti Bhusan Balabantaray	61,319	38.24	▼3.67
BJP	Biswaranjan Badajena	26,256	16.37	▲4.64
NOTA	None of the above	1,284	0.80	
Majority		7,522	4.70	
Turnout		1,60,312	67.46	
INC gain from BJD				

=== 2014 ===
In 2014 election, Biju Janata Dal candidate Bhagirathi Badajena defeated Indian National Congress candidate Suresh Kumar Routray by a margin of 5747 votes.

2014 Vidhan Sabha Election, Jatani
Party	Candidate	Votes	%	±%
BJD	Bhagirathi Badajena	60,976	41.92	−
INC	Suresh Kumar Routray	55,229	37.97	−
BJP	Sudipta Kumar Ray	17,085	11.74	−
NOTA	None of the above	1,564	1.08	−
Majority		5,747	3.95 (Note: %of total valid votes)	−
Turnout		1,45,469	70.35	▲9.85
Registered electors		2,06,792		
BJD hold				

=== 2009 ===
In 2009 election, Biju Janata Dal candidate Bibhuti Bhusan Balabantaray defeated Indian National Congress candidate Suresh Kumar Routray by a margin of 14,925 votes.

2009 Vidhan Sabha Election, Jatani
Party	Candidate	Votes	%	±%
BJD	Bibhuti Bhusan Balabantaray	55,573	47.85	−
INC	Suresh Kumar Routray	40,648	35.00	−
Independent	Sarat Chandra Paikray	8,756	7.54	−
BJP	Sudipta Ray	7,812	6.73	−
Majority		14,925	12.85 (Note: %of total valid votes)	−
Turnout		1,16,142	60.50 (Note: 2004 Voter turnout was 63.31%)	▼2.81
Registered electors		1,91,962		
BJD hold				
