= Laikera Assembly constituency =

Former constituency of the Odisha Legislative Assembly

Laikera
- Former constituency for the Odisha Legislative Assembly

Constituency details
- Country: India
- Region: East India
- State: Odisha
- District: Jharsuguda
- Lok Sabha constituency: Bargarh
- Established: 1967
- Abolished: 2008
- Reservation: ST

Laikera was an Assembly constituency from Jharsuguda district of Odisha. It was established in 1967 and abolished in 2008 following Delimitation. It was subsumed into the Jharsuguda Assembly constituency. This constituency was reserved for Schedule Tribes.

== Elected members ==
Between 1967 & 2008, 10 elections were held.

List of members elected from Laikera constituency are:

Year	Member	Party
1967	Lala Gajendra Singh	Swatantra Party
1971	Rameshwar Singh Naik	Orissa Jana Congress
1974	Hemananda Biswal	Indian National Congress
1977	Rameshwar Singh Naik	Janata Party
1980	Hemananda Biswal	Indian National Congress (I)
1985	Hemananda Biswal	Indian National Congress
1990	Hemananda Biswal	Indian National Congress
1995	Hemananda Biswal	Indian National Congress
2000	Hemananda Biswal	Indian National Congress
2004	Brundaban Majhi	Bharatiya Janata Party
