= Kahnu Charan Lenka =

Indian politician (1939–2026)

Kanhu Charan Lenka
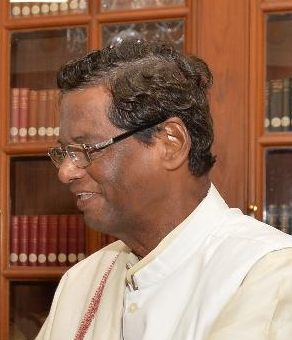
- Lenka in 2015

Member of Parliament, Rajya Sabha
- In office 1988–1994
- Constituency: Odisha

Personal details
- Born: 2 March 1939
- Died: 13 February 2026 (aged 86) Bhubaneswar, Odisha, India
- Party: Indian National Congress
- Spouse: Bijaya Laxmi Lenka
- Children: Satyabrata Lenka, Subrat lenka

Kanhu Charan Lenka (2 March 1939 – 13 February 2026), also spelt Kanu, was an Indian politician and a senior Odia political figure of the Odisha Congress (the provincial party unit of the Indian National Congress). He was twice elected to the Rajya Sabha, the upper house of the Parliament of India from Odisha. He also served as an elected member of the Odisha Legislative Assembly for four terms (1971, 1974, 1980 and 1995).

He started his career in politics during his student years at Ravenshaw College, Cuttack and later on took keen interest in youth organisations, social workers associations and labour unions like INTUC and Hind Mazdoor Sabha.

Lenka was Minister of State for Railways and Union Minister of State for Agriculture under the Narasimha Rao. He was earlier elected to the Odisha Legislative Assembly and he was an Odisha state minister. He was a loyalist of Indira Gandhi and stood by her during the split in the Indian National Congress and subsequently won from the requisitionist faction of the Congress on the cow and the calf symbol.

During his stint in Rajya Sabha, Lenka was member of the electoral college for the presidential elections held in India during 1992.

Lenka died at private hospital in Bhubaneswar, on 13 February 2026, at the age of 86.
