= Ramchandrapur Assembly Constituency =

Former constituency of the Odisha Legislative Assembly

Ramchandrapur
- Former constituency for the Odisha Legislative Assembly

Constituency details
- Country: India
- Region: East India
- State: Odisha
- District: Kendujhar
- Lok Sabha constituency: Kendujhar
- Established: 1961
- Abolished: 2008
- Reservation: None

Ramchandrapur was an Assembly constituency from Kendujhar district of Odisha. It was established in 1961 and abolished in 2008. After 2008 delimitation, It was subsumed by the Telkoi Assembly constituency.

== Elected members ==
Between 1961 & 2008, 11 elections were held.

List of members elected from Ramchandrapur constituency are:

| Year | Member | Party |
|---|---|---|
| 1961 | Muralidhar Kuanr | Indian National Congress |
| 1967 | Rajaballav Mishra | Swatantra Party |
| 1971 | Muralidhar Kuanr | Indian National Congress |
| 1974 | Muralidhar Kuanr | Utkal Congress |
| 1977 | Khirod Prasad Swain | Janata Party |
| 1980 | Niranjan Patnaik | Indian National Congress (I) |
| 1985 | Niranjan Patnaik | Indian National Congress |
| 1990 | Badri Narayan Patra | Janata Dal |
| 1995 | Niranjan Patnaik | Indian National Congress |
| 2000 | Badri Narayan Patra | Independent |
| 2004 | Niranjan Patnaik | Indian National Congress |
