= Suresh Kumar Routray =

Indian politician from Odisha

Member of Odisha Legislative Assembly
- In office 23 May 2019 – 4 Jun 2024
- Preceded by: Bhagirathi Badajena
- Succeeded by: Bibhuti Bhusan Balabantaray
- Constituency: Jatani
- In office 1995–2004
- Preceded by: Sarat Chandra Paikray
- Succeeded by: Sarat Chandra Paikray
- Constituency: Jatani
- In office 1977–1990
- Preceded by: Satyapriya Mohanty
- Succeeded by: Sarat Chandra Paikray
- Constituency: Jatani

Minister of State, Sports & Youth Services
- In office March, 1995 – January, 1996
- In office February, 1999 – December, 1999

Minister of State (Ind), Excise
- In office January, 1996 – March, 2000

Personal details
- Born: 10 August 1945 (age 81) Chhanaghara, Odisha, India
- Party: Indian National Congress
- Other political affiliations: Janata Party
- Spouse: Malati Routray
- Children: 5
- Parent: Shashi Krushna Routray (father)
- Relatives: Prasad Kumar Harichandan (son-in-law)

Suresh Kumar Routray (born 10 August 1945), also popularly known as Sura Routray, is an Indian politician and a former Minister Of States (ind.) Excise (January 1996 - March 2000), former Minister Of State, Sports & Youth Services (March 1995 - January 1996, February 1999- December 1999) also a former member of the Odisha Legislative Assembly, representing the Jatani Assembly constituency. He was first elected in the 1977 Odisha Legislative Assembly election, and was most recently elected as member of the Indian National Congress in the 2019 election.

== Early life and education ==
Routray was born on 10 August 1945, to Shashikrushna Routray and Chhaya Devi. His wife's name is Malati Routray. His son-in-law, Prasad Kumar Harichandan, worked as the Odisha Pradesh Congress Committee President. "Madichala", "Lagatali", "Ready!", and "Very Beautiful" are some of his popular dialogues.

== Electoral history ==
Start	End	Post	Constituency	Party
1977	1980	Member, 7th Odisha legislative assembly	Jatani	Janata
1980	1985	Member, 8th Odisha legislative assembly	Jatani	Indian national congress
1985	1990	Member, 9th Odisha legislative assembly	Jatani	Indian national congress
1995	2000	Member, 11th Odisha legislative assembly	Jatani	Indian national congress
2000	2004	Member, 12th Odisha legislative assembly	Jatani	Indian national congress
2019	2024	Member, 16th Odisha legislative assembly	Jatani	Indian national congress
