= Amarnath Pradhan =

Indian politician

Amarnath Pradhan (born 11 May 1958) is an Indian politician. He was a member of the 15th Indian Parliament, and represented Sambalpur (Lok Sabha constituency). He has a post-graduate degree in Social Work (MSW) from Sam Higginbottom University of Agriculture, Technology and Sciences.

== See also ==
- Sambalpur (Lok Sabha constituency)
