= Basant Kumar Biswal =

Indian politician (1936–2003)

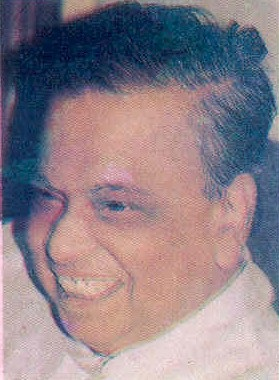

4th Deputy Chief Minister of Odisha
- In office 15 March 1995 – 5 March 2000 Serving with Hemananda Biswal( Till 9 May 1998)
- Preceded by: Nilamani Routray
- Succeeded by: Kanak Vardhan Singh Deo; Pravati Parida

Member of Odisha Legislative Assembly
- In office 1990–2000
- Preceded by: Nityananda Samntaray
- Succeeded by: Debashish Samantaray
- Constituency: Tirtol

Personal details
- Born: Basant Kumar Biswal; 23 August 1936 Tulang village, Jagatsinghpur district
- Died: 7 September 2003 (aged 67)
- Party: Indian National Congress
- Spouse: Meera Biswal
- Children: Ranjib Biswal; Chiranjib Biswal
- Occupation: Farmer

Basant Kumar Biswal (August 23, 1936 – September 7, 2003) was a politician belonging to the Indian National Congress party from Odisha. He was Deputy Chief Minister of Odisha. He was member of the legislative assembly from Tirtol assembly constituency and was Vice-President of the Odisha Pradesh Congress Committee.

He had two sons, Ranjib Biswal a former cricketer, manager of the Indian Cricket Team and Chairman of Indian Premier League, as well as a Rajya Sabha Member of parliament for Odisha, as part of the Indian National Congress party. His second son Chiranjib Biswal is a Congress MLA from Jagatsinghpur assembly constituency and deputy opposition leader of the Odisha assembly.
