= Saraswati Hembram =

Indian politician

Member of the Odisha Legislative Assembly
- In office 1995-2000
- Constituency: Khunta (Vidhan Sabha constituency)
- In office 1980-1990
- Constituency: Kuliana (Vidhan Sabha constituency)

Personal details
- Party: Indian National Congress
- Other political affiliations: Biju Janata Dal

Saraswati Hembram was an Indian politician. She was elected to the Odisha Legislative Assembly as a member of the Indian National Congress.
