= Parama Pujari =

Indian politician

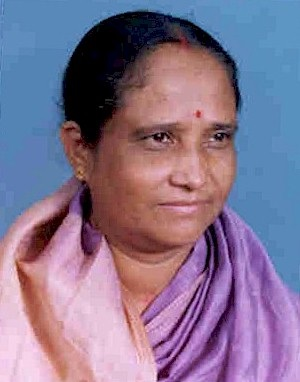

Member of the Odisha Legislative Assembly
- In office 1995-2004
- Preceded by: Gurubari Majhi
- Succeeded by: Dharmu Gond
- In office 1980 -1990
- Preceded by: Rabisingh Majhi
- Succeeded by: Gurubari Majhi
- Constituency: Umerkote

Personal details
- Born: July 1, 1954 (age 71)
- Party: Indian National Congress

Parama Pujari is an Indian politician. She was elected to the Odisha Legislative Assembly as a member of the Indian National Congress.
