= Ramagiri Assembly constituency =

Former constituency of the Odisha Legislative Assembly

Ramagiri
- Former constituency for the Odisha Legislative Assembly

Constituency details
- Country: India
- Region: East India
- State: Odisha
- District: Gajapati
- Lok Sabha constituency: Berhampur
- Established: 1957
- Abolished: 2008
- Reservation: ST

Ramagiri was an Assembly constituency from Gajapati district of Odisha. It was established in 1957 and abolished in 2008. After 2008 delimitation, It was subsumed by the Mohana Assembly constituency. This constituency was reserved for Schedule Tribes.

== Elected members ==
Between 1957 & 2008, 12 elections were held.

List of members elected from Ramagiri constituency are:

Year	Member	Party
As R. Udaigiri Constituency
1957	Ramachandra Bhoya	Indian National Congress
1961	Ramachandra Bhoya	Indian National Congress
As Ramagiri Constituency
1967	Arjun Singh	Indian National Congress
1971	Gorasango Savara	Indian National Congress
1974	Chakradhar Paik	Utkal Congress
1977	Gorasango Savara	Indian National Congress
1980	Gorasango Savara	Indian National Congress (I)
1985	Haladhar Karji	Independent
1990	Haladhar Karji	Indian National Congress
1995	Haladhar Karji	Indian National Congress
2000	Haladhar Karji	Indian National Congress
2004	Bharata Paika	Bharatiya Janata Party
