= Prasad Kumar Harichandan =

Indian politician (born 1964)

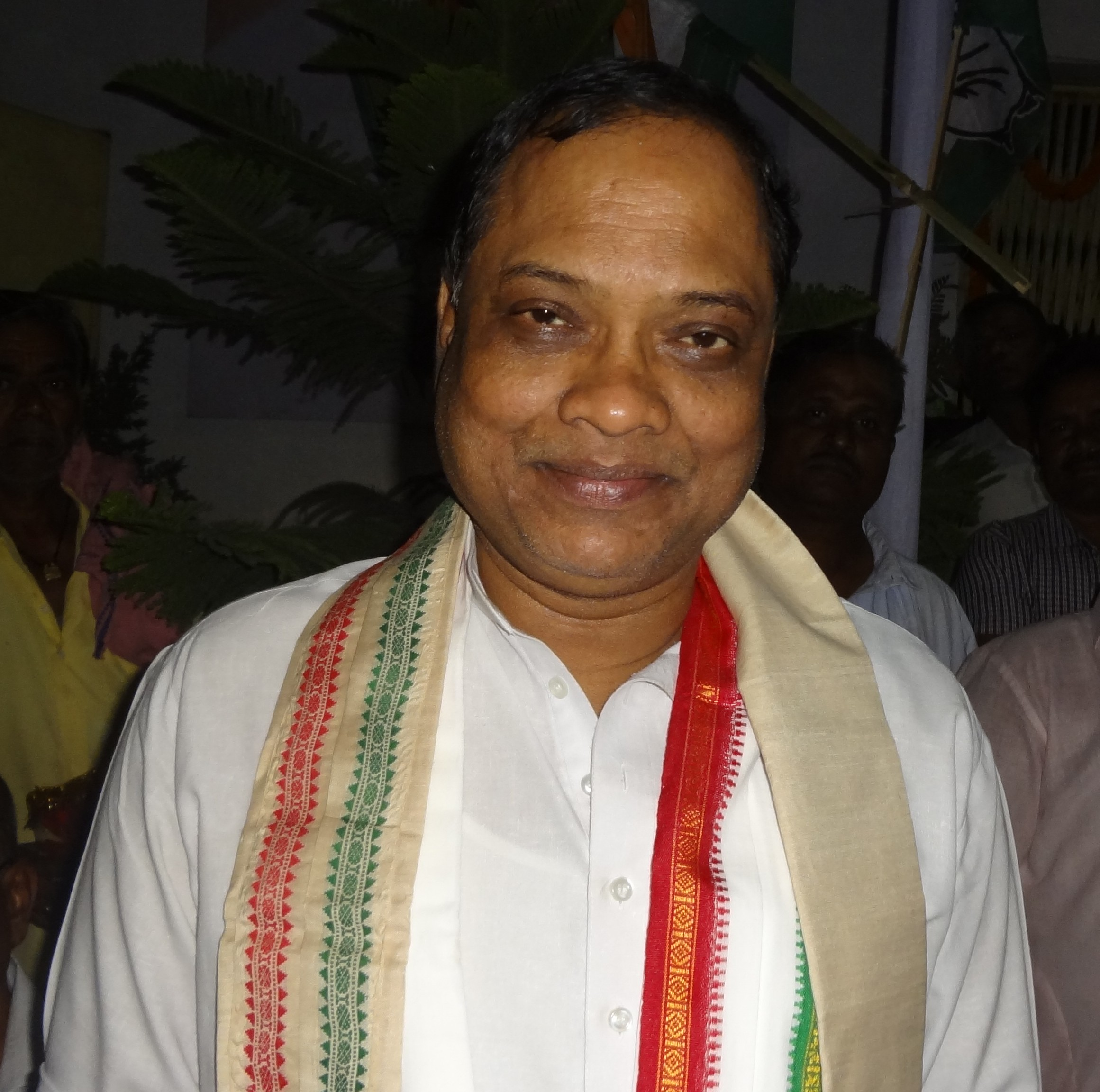

Member: Odisha Legislative Assembly
- In office 2009–2014
- Preceded by: Ramaranjan Baliarsingh
- Succeeded by: Umakanta Samantray
- Constituency: Satyabadi
- In office 1995–2004
- Preceded by: Chandramadhab Mishra
- Succeeded by: Ramaranjan Baliarsingh

Personal details
- Born: Prasad Kumar Harichandan; 12 May 1964 (age 62) Nanakera, Puri District, Odisha
- Party: Congress
- Spouse: Snehashree Harichandan
- Education: Utkal University
- Website: Official Website

Prasad Kumar Harichandan also known as Prasad Harichandan (born: 12 May 1964) is an Oriya politician and the former president of Odisha Pradesh Congress Committee, known for revolutionary slogan, "ମୁଁ ନୁହେଁ, ଆମେ". He is the son-in-law of comedian-cum-politician Sura Routray.

He was born on 12 May 1964 at Nanakera, in Puri district, Odisha. He was elected to the Eleventh, Twelfth and Fourteenth Odisha Legislative Assembly. He was the youngest Minister of State in 1999 and held Home, Science, Technology and Culture departments. He was the Chief Whip of the Congress Legislature Party in 14th Assembly from 2009 to 2014.
