= Raghunath Patnaik =

Indian politician

Raghunath Patnaik was an Indian politician and a veteran leader of the Indian National Congress.

Patnaik was born in a village near Jeypore in the district of Koraput in Odisha. Known as a 'Gentleman Politician' in Odisha, he has been associated in active politics since a very early age and has been working as an active worker of the congress party since then.

In his political career that spanned across nearly six decades, he has won several elections and has been elected as a member of the municipality, chairman of the Jeypore municipality and MLA from Jeypore. He has represented the Jeypore constituency six times in the Odisha legislative assembly and besides being the Leader of Opposition in the assembly has worked as a Cabinet Minister for Finance, Law, Panchaytiraj departments of Government of Odisha several times. He was also Chairman, Law Revision Committee.

He was elected as the member of urban local body of Jeypore for the first time at the age of 21 and was elected as the chairman of Jeypore municipality at the age of 25. During his chairmanship in municipality the electric street lights were introduced in Jeypore replacing the manual oil lamp posts. Establishment of Govt. Women's College and construction of Upper Kolab dam are few among his contributions in the development of the region.

Patnaik died on 12 May 2016, following a brief illness. He was 89.
