= Melchhamunda Assembly constituency =

Former constituency of the Odisha Legislative Assembly

Melchhamunda
- Former constituency for the Odisha Legislative Assembly

Constituency details
- Country: India
- Region: East India
- State: Odisha
- District: Bargarh
- Lok Sabha constituency: Bargarh
- Established: 1971
- Abolished: 2008
- Reservation: None

Melchhamunda was an Assembly constituency from Bargarh district of Odisha. It was established in 1961 and abolished in 2008. After 2008 delimitation, It was subsumed by the Attabira Assembly constituency.

== Members of the Legislative Assembly ==
Between 1971 & 2008, 11 elections were held.

List of members elected from Melchhamunda constituency are:

Year	Member	Party
1961	Sachidananda Padhy	Indian National Congress
1967	Birendra Kumar Sahoo	Swatantra Party
1971	Birendra Kumar Sahoo	Swatantra Party
1974	Prakash Chandra Debta	Indian National Congress
1977	Birendra Kumar Sahoo	Janata Party
1980	Prakash Chandra Debta	Indian National Congress (I)
1985	Prakash Chandra Debta	Indian National Congress
1990	Murari Prasad Mishra	Janata Dal
1995	Prakash Chandra Debta	Indian National Congress
2000	Prakash Chandra Debta	Indian National Congress
2004	Mohammad Rafique	Bharatiya Janata Party
