= Gajadhar Majhi =

Indian politician

Member of Parliament, Lok Sabha
- In office 1971-1977
- Preceded by: Debananda Amat
- Succeeded by: Debananda Amat
- Constituency: Sundargarh, Odisha

Personal details
- Born: 14 June 1942 (age 83) Belmunda, Sundargarh District, Orissa, British India
- Party: Indian National Congress

Gajadhar Majhi is an Indian politician. He was elected to the Lok Sabha, the lower house of the Parliament of India from Sundargarh, Odisha as a member of the Indian National Congress.
