= Hemananda Biswal =

Indian politician (1939–2022)

- ହେମାନନ୍ଦ ବିଶ୍ବାଳ
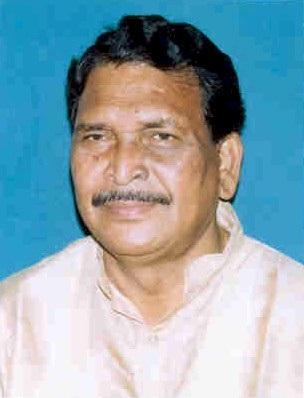

12th Chief Minister of Odisha
- In office 6 December 1999 – 5 March 2000
- Preceded by: Giridhar Gamang
- Succeeded by: Naveen Patnaik
- In office 7 December 1989 – 5 March 1990
- Preceded by: Janaki Ballabh Pattanaik
- Succeeded by: Biju Patnaik

Member of Parliament, Lok Sabha
- In office 16 May 2009 — 16 May 2014
- Preceded by: Jual Oram
- Succeeded by: Jual Oram
- Constituency: Sundargarh

Member of the Odisha Legislative Assembly
- In office 1974–1977
- Preceded by: Rameshwar Singh Naik
- Succeeded by: Rameshwar Singh Naik
- Constituency: Laikera
- In office 1980–2004
- Preceded by: Himself
- Succeeded by: Brundaban Majhi
- Constituency: Laikera

3rd Deputy Chief Minister of Odisha
- In office 15 March 1995 – 9 May 1998 Serving with Basant Kumar Biswal
- Preceded by: Nilamani Routray
- Succeeded by: Pravati Parida; Kanak Vardhan Singh Deo

Personal details
- Born: 1 December 1939 Thakurpada, Orissa, British India
- Died: 25 February 2022 (aged 82) Bhubaneswar, Odisha, India
- Spouse: Urmila Biswal
- Children: Sabita, Sanjukta, Manjulata, Sunita and Amita
- Website: http://hemanandbiswal.com/

Hemananda Biswal (1 December 1939 – 25 February 2022) was an Indian politician. Biswal served as Chief Minister of Odisha and also as the leader of the house in state legislative assembly from 7 December 1989 to 5 March 1990, and again from 6 December 1999 to 5 March 2000. He was the last Congress CM of the state.

He was also the MP of Sundergarh from 2009 to 2014. Biswal was the first tribal chief minister of Odisha.

== Early life and education ==
Biswal was born in Thakurpada village of Odisha on 1 December 1939, to Basudev and Trimani Biswal. He completed intermediate education from Government College, Sundargarh, and by profession was an agriculturist.

== Political career ==
Biswal belonged to the Indian National Congress party. In 1974, he was elected for the first time to the Odisha Legislative Assembly and served until 1977. Later, in 1980, he was again elected from the Jharsuguda as MLA, a position he held until 2004. He was the chief minister of Odisha for the first time from 7 December 1989 to 5 March 1990 and for the second time from 6 December 1999 to 5 March 2000. From 2009 to 2014, he was the MP from Sundargarh.

== Personal life and death ==
Biswal was married to Urmila Biswal and together they had five daughters. He died at a private hospital in Bhubaneswar on 25 February 2022, at the age of 82. He suffered from pneumonia and COVID-19 prior to his death.

Preceded by Janaki Ballabh Pattanaik(1st term); Giridhar Gamang(2nd term)	Chief Minister of Odisha; 7 December 1989 to 5 March 1990 (1st term); 6 December 1999 to 5 March 2000 (2nd term)	Succeeded by Biju Patnaik(1st term); Naveen Patnaik(2nd term)
