= Bhagabat Prasad Mohanty =

Indian politician and lawyer (1929–2019)

Odisha Legislative Assembly
- In office 1971–1974
- Preceded by: Saroj Kanta Kanungo
- Succeeded by: Bed Prakash Agarwal
- Constituency: Kendrapara
- In office 1985–1990
- Preceded by: Indramani Rout
- Succeeded by: Bed Prakash Agarwal
- Constituency: Kendrapara
- In office 1995–2000
- Preceded by: Bed Prakash Agarwal
- Succeeded by: Bed Prakash Agarwal
- Constituency: Kendrapara

Personal details
- Born: 27 November 1929
- Died: 8 December 2019 (aged 90)
- Party: Indian National Congress

Bhagabat Prasad Mohanty (27 November 1929 – 8 December 2019) was an Indian politician and lawyer from Odisha belonging to Indian National Congress. He was elected as a legislator of the Odisha Legislative Assembly three times. He also served as Higher Education Minister of the Government of Odisha.

== Biography ==
Mohanty was born on 27 November 1929. He was elected as a legislator of the Odisha Legislative Assembly from Kendrapara in 1971 as a Praja Socialist Party candidate. Later, he joined Indian National Congress. He was elected as a legislator of the Odisha Legislative Assembly as an Indian National Congress candidate in 1985 and 1995.

Mohanty died on 8 December 2019 at the age of 90.
