= 9th Orissa Legislative Assembly =

9th state legislature of the Indian state of Orissa

←	8th Assembly	10th Assembly	→
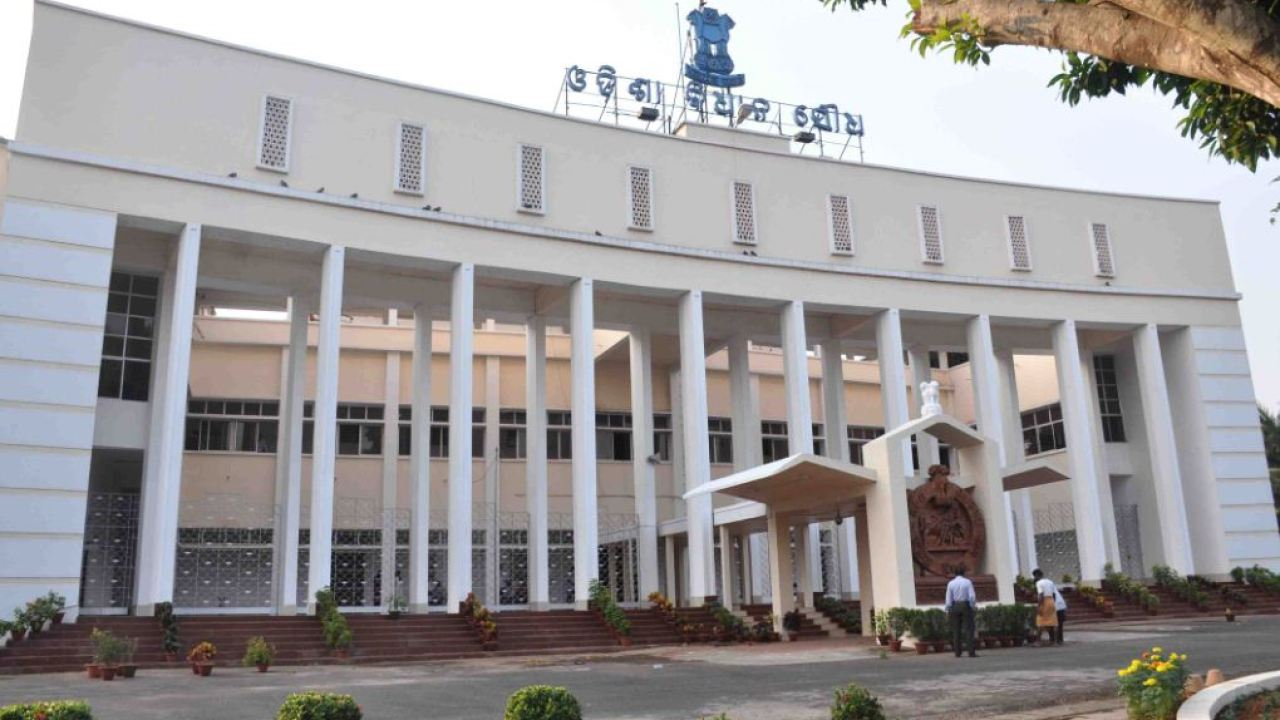
- Front view of Odisha Vidhan Saudha, Bhubaneshwar (2010)

Overview
- Meeting place: Odisha Vidhan Saudha, Bhubaneshwar, Orissa, India
- Term: 9 March 1985 – 3 March 1990
- Election: 1985
- Government: Indian National Congress
- Opposition: Janata Party
- Website: assembly.odisha.gov.in

Orissa Legislative Assembly
- House Composition as assembly begins
- Members: 147
- Governor: Bishambhar Nath Pande; Saiyid Nurul Hasan; Yagya Dutt Sharma
- Speaker: Prasanna Kumar Dash, INC
- Deputy Speaker: Chintamani Dyan Samantra, INC
- Leader of the House (Chief Minister): Janaki Ballabh Patnaik, INC; Hemananda Biswal, INC
- Leader of Opposition: Biju Patnaik, JP
- Party control: Indian National Congress (117/147)
- 11 Sessions with 188 Sittings

The Ninth Orissa Legislative Assembly was convened after 1985 Orissa Legislative Assembly election.

== Brief history ==
Riding on the sympathy wave, after the death of Indira Gandhi, Chief Minister Janaki Ballabh Patnaik won the reelection of 1985 Orissa Assembly election. He along with 5 Cabinet Ministers and 9 Minister of State were administered the oath of office and secrecy by Governor Bishambhar Nath Pande at the Raj Bhavan, Bhubaneswar on 10 March 1985. Ministry was further expanded on 30 May 1985 & 22 July 1986. Following poor performance of Congress party in the 1989 Lok Sabha elections, Shri Patnaik stepped down as CM taking moral responsibility on 7 December 1989. On Same day, Shri Hemananda Biswal along with 6 Cabinet Ministers, 15 Minister of State and 2 Deputy Minister were administered the oath of office and secrecy by Governor Saiyid Nurul Hasan. Shri Biswal resigned on 5 March 1990 following Congress party's defeat in 1990 Odisha Legislative Assembly election.

== House Composition ==
Party	Strength	
Party	Assembly Begins	Assembly Dissolves
Indian National Congress	117	111
Janata Party	21	19
Communist Party of India	1	1
Bharatiya Janata Party	1	1
Independent	7	6
Vacant	-	11

== Office Bearers ==
Post	Portrait	Name	Tenure		Party
Governor		Bishambhar Nath Pande	Assembly Begins	20 November 1988	N/A
Governor		Saiyid Nurul Hasan (Additional Charge)	20 November 1988	20 March 1989	N/A
Governor		Saiyid Nurul Hasan	20 March 1989	6 February 1990	N/A
Governor		Yagya Dutt Sharma	7 February 1990	Assembly Dissolves	N/A
Speaker		Prasanna Kumar Dash; MLA from Baripada	14 March 1985	9 March 1990	Indian National Congress
Deputy Speaker		Chintamani Dyan Samantra; MLA from Chikiti	18 March 1985	3 March 1990	Indian National Congress
Leader of the House (Chief Minister); Leader of INC Legislature Party		Janaki Ballabh Patnaik; MLA from Athgarh	10 March 1985	7 December 1989	Indian National Congress
Leader of the House (Chief Minister); Leader of INC Legislature Party		Hemananda Biswal; MLA from Laikera	7 December 1989	5 March 1990	Indian National Congress
Leader of Opposition; Leader of JP Legislature Party		Biju Patnaik; MLA from Bhubaneswar	22 March 1985	3 March 1990	Janata Party
Pro tem Speaker		Shraddhakar Supakar; MLA from Sambalpur	13 March 1985	3 March 1985	Indian National Congress

== Council of Ministers ==
=== Janaki Ballabh Patnaik Ministry ===
Source
Portfolio	Portrait	Name Constituency	Tenure		Party
Chief Minister; Home; General Administration; Planning & Coordination; Other departments not allocated to any Minister.		Janaki Ballabh Patnaik; MLA from Athgarh	10 March 1985	7 December 1989	INC
Finance		Janaki Ballabh Patnaik; MLA from Athgarh	10 March 1985	30 May 1985	INC
Science & Technology; Environment; Industries; Information & Public Relations; Sports; Works; Mines & Geology; Irrigation & Power; Housing & Urban Development		Janaki Ballabh Patnaik; MLA from Athgarh	10 March 1985	22 July 1986	INC
Revenue		Janaki Ballabh Patnaik; MLA from Athgarh	30 April 1985	30 May 1985	INC
Tourism; Culture		Janaki Ballabh Patnaik; MLA from Athgarh	30 May 1985	19 December 1986	INC
Administrative Reforms, Training Co-ordination & Public Grievances		Janaki Ballabh Patnaik; MLA from Athgarh	23 August 1985	7 December 1989	INC
Fisheries & Animal Husbandry		Janaki Ballabh Patnaik; MLA from Athgarh	22 July 1986	7 December 1989	INC
Finance; Harijan & Tribal Welfare; Health & Family Welfare		Janaki Ballabh Patnaik; MLA from Athgarh	19 December 1986	6 February 1987	INC
Commerce and Transport		Janaki Ballabh Patnaik; MLA from Athgarh	18 October 1989	7 December 1989	INC
Cabinet Minister
Commerce and Transport		Anupa Singh Deo; MLA from Khariar	10 March 1985	22 July 1986	INC
Labour & Employment		Anupa Singh Deo; MLA from Khariar	30 May 1985	22 July 1986	INC
Harijan & Tribal Welfare		Bhajaman Behara; MLA from Talcher	10 March 1985	19 December 1986	INC
Tourism; Culture		Gangadhar Mohapatra; MLA from Brahmagiri	10 March 1985	30 May 1985	INC
Law		Gangadhar Mohapatra; MLA from Brahmagiri	10 March 1985	19 December 1986	INC
Finance		Gangadhar Mohapatra; MLA from Brahmagiri	30 May 1985	19 December 1986	INC
Education & Youth Services		Jugal Kishore Pattanayak; MLA from Bhadrak	10 March 1985	30 May 1985	INC
Education & Youth Services		Jadunath Das Mohapatra; MLA from Soro	30 May 1985	7 December 1989	INC
Sports		Jadunath Das Mohapatra; MLA from Soro	22 July 1986	7 December 1989	INC
Revenue		Niranjan Patnaik; MLA from Ramchandrapur	10 March 1985	30 April 1985	INC
Revenue		Jugal Kishore Pattanayak; MLA from Bhadrak	30 May 1985	7 December 1989	INC
Law		Jugal Kishore Pattanayak; MLA from Bhadrak	19 December 1986	7 December 1989	INC
Finance		Jugal Kishore Pattanayak; MLA from Bhadrak	6 February 1987	7 December 1989	INC
Food & Civil Supplies		Harihar Karan; MLA from Daspalla	22 July 1986	7 December 1989	INC
Irrigation & Power		Sk. Matlub Ali; MLA from Mahanga	22 July 1986	7 December 1989	INC
Parliamentary Affairs in General Administration		Sk. Matlub Ali; MLA from Mahanga	1 September 1986	7 December 1989	INC
Science & Technology; Industries		Niranjan Patnaik; MLA from Ramchandrapur	22 July 1986	7 December 1989	INC
Health & Family Welfare		Niranjan Patnaik; MLA from Ramchandrapur	6 February 1987	7 December 1989	INC
Agriculture		Ras Bihari Behera; MLA from Koksara	22 July 1986	7 December 1989	INC
Harijan & Tribal Welfare; Co-operation		Ras Bihari Behera; MLA from Koksara	6 February 1987	7 December 1989	INC
Minister of State
Community Development & Rural Reconstruction		Batakrushna Jena; MLA from Kissannagar	10 March 1985	22 July 1986	INC
Community Development & Rural Reconstruction		Habibulla Khan; MLA from Nowrangpur	22 July 1986	7 December 1989	INC
Forest		Bhupal Chandra Mohapatra; MLA from Basta	13 March 1985	22 July 1986	INC
Forest; Environment		Dambarudhara Ulaka; MLA from Bissam-cuttack	22 July 1986	7 December 1989	INC
Excise		Dambarudhara Ulaka; MLA from Bissam-cuttack	10 March 1985	30 May 1985	INC
Excise		Nagarjuna Pradhan; MLA from Udayagiri	30 May 1985	7 December 1989	INC
Fisheries & Animal Husbandry		Frida Topno; MLA from Raghunathpali	10 March 1985	22 July 1986	INC
Food & Civil Supplies		Habibulla Khan; MLA from Nowrangpur	10 March 1985	22 July 1986	INC
Health & Family Welfare		Hemananda Biswal; MLA from Laikera	10 March 1985	19 December 1986	INC
Labour & Employment		Mahmmed Muzafar Hussain Khan; MLA from Bolangir	10 March 1985	30 May 1985	INC
Labour & Employment		Bhupal Chandra Mohapatra; MLA from Basta	22 July 1986	7 December 1989	INC
Works		Mahmmed Muzafar Hussain Khan; MLA from Bolangir	30 May 1985	7 December 1989	INC
Housing		Mahmmed Muzafar Hussain Khan; MLA from Bolangir	22 July 1986	7 December 1989	INC
Irrigation		Mohan Nag; MLA from Bhatli	10 March 1985	22 July 1986	INC
Mines & Geology		Mohan Nag; MLA from Bhatli	22 July 1986	7 December 1989	INC
Co-operation		Nagarjuna Pradhan; MLA from Udayagiri	10 March 1985	30 May 1985	INC
Co-operation		Sarat Chandra Panda; MLA from Suruda	30 May 1985	22 July 1986	INC
Agriculture		Sarat Chandra Panda; MLA from Suruda	10 March 1985	22 July 1986	INC
Commerce and Transport; Fisheries & Animal Husbandry		Sarat Chandra Panda; MLA from Suruda	22 July 1986	18 October 1989	INC
Housing & Urban Development		Dambarudhara Ulaka; MLA from Bissam-cuttack	30 May 1985	22 July 1986	INC
Urban Development		Batakrushna Jena; MLA from Kissannagar	22 July 1986	7 December 1989	INC
Information & Public Relations		Sarat Rout; MLA from Sukinda	30 May 1985	22 July 1986	INC
Information & Public Relations		Bhupinder Singh; MLA from Kesinga	22 July 1986	7 December 1989	INC
Irrigation & Power		Bhupinder Singh; MLA from Kesinga	22 July 1986	7 December 1989	INC
Planning & Coordination		Sarat Rout; MLA from Sukinda	30 May 1985	7 December 1989	INC
Tourism; Culture		Sarat Rout; MLA from Sukinda	22 July 1986	7 December 1989	INC
Education & Youth Services; Sports		Frida Topno; MLA from Raghunathpali	22 July 1986	7 December 1989	INC
Deputy Minister
Harijan & Tribal Welfare		Parama Pujari; MLA from Umarkote	22 July 1986	7 December 1989	INC
Community Development & Rural Reconstruction		Saraswati Hembram; MLA from Kuliana	22 July 1986	7 December 1989	INC

=== Hemananda Biswal Ministry ===
Source
Portfolio	Portrait	Name Constituency	Tenure		Party
Chief Minister; Home; General Administration; Planning & Coordination; Industries; Science & Technology; Works; Housing; Community Development & Rural Reconstruction; Other departments not allocated to any Minister.		Hemananda Biswal; MLA from Laikera	7 December 1989	5 March 1990	INC
Cabinet Minister
Commerce and Transport		Anupa Singh Deo; MLA from Khariar	7 December 1989	5 March 1990	INC
Revenue; Excise		Bhagabat Prasad Mohanty; MLA from Kendrapara	7 December 1989	5 March 1990	INC
Harijan & Tribal Welfare		Dambaru Majhi; MLA from Dabugam	7 December 1989	5 March 1990	INC
Finance; Law		Gangadhar Mohapatra; MLA from Brahmagiri	7 December 1989	5 March 1990	INC
Agriculture; Co-operation		Ras Behari Behera; MLA from Koksara	7 December 1989	5 March 1990	INC
Education & Youth Services		Sk. Matlub Ali; MLA from Mahanga	7 December 1989	5 March 1990	INC
Minister of State with Independent Charges
Information & Public Relations		Amarnath Pradhan; MLA from Athmallik	7 December 1989	5 March 1990	INC
Tourism; Sports & Culture		Bibhuti Bhusan Singh Mardaraj; MLA from Khandapara	7 December 1989	5 March 1990	INC
Irrigation & Power		Bhupinder Singh; MLA from Kesinga	7 December 1989	5 March 1990	INC
Urban Development		Dolagobinda Pradhan; MLA from Cuttack Sadar	7 December 1989	5 March 1990	INC
Housing; Labour & Employment		Gajadhar Majhi; MLA from Talsara	7 December 1989	5 March 1990	INC
Mines & Geology		Jayadev Jena; MLA from Anandapur	7 December 1989	5 March 1990	INC
Fisheries & Animal Husbandry		Mohan Nag; MLA from Bhatli	7 December 1989	5 March 1990	INC
Forest & Environment		Netrananda Mallick; MLA from Chandbali	7 December 1989	5 March 1990	INC
Health & Family Welfare		Sitakanta Mahapatra; MLA from Barchana	7 December 1989	5 March 1990	INC
Minister of State
Lift Irrigation		Amarnath Pradhan; MLA from Athmallik	7 December 1989	5 March 1990	INC
Planning & Coordination		Bibhuti Bhusan Singh Mardaraj; MLA from Khandapara	7 December 1989	5 March 1990	INC
Education & Youth Services		Frida Topno; MLA from Raghunathpali	7 December 1989	5 March 1990	INC
Industries		Jagannath Rout; MLA from Dhamnagar	7 December 1989	5 March 1990	INC
Science & Technology		Jayadev Jena; MLA from Anandapur	7 December 1989	5 March 1990	INC
Agriculture; Co-operation		Kartika Prasad Taria; MLA from Birmaharajpur	7 December 1989	5 March 1990	INC
Works		Prakash Chandra Debata; MLA from Melchhamunda	7 December 1989	5 March 1990	INC
Food & Civil Supplies		Raghab Parida; MLA from Aska	7 December 1989	5 March 1990	INC
Community Development & Rural Reconstruction		Saraswati Hembram; MLA from Kuliana	7 December 1989	5 March 1990	INC
Deputy Minister
Health & Family Welfare		Parama Pujari; MLA from Umarkote	7 December 1989	5 March 1990	INC
Harijan & Tribal Welfare; Labour & Employment		Judisthir Jena; MLA from Jaleswar	7 December 1989	5 March 1990	INC

== Members of Legislative Assembly ==
Source
District	AC. No.	Constituency	Member	Party	Remarks
Mayurbhanj	1	Karanjia (ST)	Karunakar Naik	Indian National Congress	
Mayurbhanj	2	Jashipur (ST)	Sambhunath Naik	Independent	
Mayurbhanj	3	Bahalda (ST)	Bhagey Gobardhan	Janata Party	Resigned on December 1989 on his election to 9th Lok Sabha
Mayurbhanj	3	Bahalda (ST)	Vacant (Since 7 December 1989)		
Mayurbhanj	4	Rairangpur (ST)	Bhabendra Nath Majhi	Indian National Congress	Expired on 3 March 1986
Mayurbhanj	4	Rairangpur (ST)	Chaitanya Prasad Majhi	Janata Party	Won in 1986 Bypoll
Mayurbhanj	5	Bangriposi (ST)	Kangoi Singh	Indian National Congress	
Mayurbhanj	6	Kuliana (ST)	Saraswati Hembram	Indian National Congress	
Mayurbhanj	7	Baripada	Prasanna Kumar Dash	Indian National Congress	
Mayurbhanj	8	Baisinga (ST)	Pruthunath Kisku	Indian National Congress	
Mayurbhanj	9	Khunta (ST)	Biram Murmu	Indian National Congress	
Mayurbhanj	10	Udala (ST)	Ramaneswar Madhei	Indian National Congress	
Baleshwar	11	Bhograi	Umarani Patra	Indian National Congress	
Baleshwar	12	Jaleswar	Judisthir Jena	Indian National Congress	
Baleshwar	13	Basta	Bhupal Chandra Mahapatra	Indian National Congress	
Baleshwar	14	Balasore	Gopanarayan Das	Indian National Congress	
Baleshwar	15	Soro	Jadunath Das Mohapatra	Indian National Congress	
Baleshwar	16	Simulia	Padma Lochan Panda	Indian National Congress	
Baleshwar	17	Nilgiri	Sukumar Nayak	Indian National Congress	
Baleshwar	18	Bhandaripokhari (SC)	Panchanan Mandal	Indian National Congress	
Baleshwar	19	Bhadrak	Jugal Kishore Pattanayak	Indian National Congress	
Baleshwar	20	Dhamnagar	Jagannath Rout	Indian National Congress	
Baleshwar	21	Chandbali (SC)	Netrananda Malik	Indian National Congress	
Baleshwar	22	Basudevpur	Madhu Sadan Panigrahi	Indian National Congress	
Cuttack	23	Sukinda	Sarata Rout	Indian National Congress	
Cuttack	24	Korai	Ramachandra Khuntia	Indian National Congress	
Cuttack	25	Jajpur (SC)	Jagannath Mallick	Janata Party	
Cuttack	26	Dharamsala	Kangali Charan Panda	Indian National Congress	
Cuttack	27	Barchana	Sitakanta Mahapatra	Indian National Congress	
Cuttack	28	Bari-Derabisi	Srikant Kumar Jena	Janata Party	Resigned on December 1989 on his election to 9th Lok Sabha
Cuttack	28	Bari-Derabisi	Vacant (Since 7 December 1989)		
Cuttack	29	Binjharpur (SC)	Nabakishore Mallick	Indian National Congress	
Cuttack	30	Aul	Olagobinda Nayak	Indian National Congress	
Cuttack	31	Patamundai (SC)	Ganeswar Behera	Indian National Congress	
Cuttack	32	Rajnagar	Nalinikanta Mohanty	Janata Party	
Cuttack	33	Kendrapara	Bhagabat Prasad Mohanty	Indian National Congress	
Cuttack	34	Patkura	Bijoy Mohapatra	Janata Party	
Cuttack	35	Tirtol	Nityananda Samntaray	Indian National Congress	
Cuttack	36	Ersama	Krushna Chandra Swain	Indian National Congress	
Cuttack	37	Balikuda	Jyotish Chandra Das	Indian National Congress	
Cuttack	38	Jagatsinghpur (SC)	Kailash Chandra Mallik	Indian National Congress	
Cuttack	39	Kissannagar	Batakrishna Jena	Indian National Congress	
Cuttack	40	Mahanga	S. K. Matlub Ali	Indian National Congress	
Cuttack	41	Salepur (SC)	Mayadhar Sethi	Indian National Congress	
Cuttack	42	Gobindpur	Trilochan Kanungo	Independent	Resigned on 15 September 1989.
Cuttack	42	Gobindpur	Vacant (Since 15 September 1989)		
Cuttack	43	Cuttack Sadar	Dola Gobind Pradhan	Indian National Congress	
Cuttack	44	Cuttack City	Sayad Mustafiz Ahemad	Janata Party	
Cuttack	45	Choudwar	Rasananda Sahu	Indian National Congress	
Cuttack	46	Banki	Akshaya Kumar Pattanaik	Indian National Congress	
Cuttack	47	Athgarh	Janaki Ballabh Patnaik	Indian National Congress	
Cuttack	48	Baramba	Lalit Mohan Mohanty	Indian National Congress	
Puri	49	Balipatna (SC)	Raghab Chandra Seth	Indian National Congress	
Puri	50	Bhubaneswar	Biju Patnaik	Janata Party	
Puri	51	Jatni	Suresh Kumar Routray	Indian National Congress	
Puri	52	Pipli	Pradeep Maharathy	Janata Party	
Puri	53	Nimapara (SC)	Rabindra Kumar Sethy	Indian National Congress	
Puri	54	Kakatpur	Surendra Nath Naik	Janata Party	
Puri	55	Satyabadi	Rabindra Kumar Das	Indian National Congress	
Puri	56	Puri	Braja Kishore Tripathy	Janata Party	
Puri	57	Brahmagiri	Gangadhar Mohapatra	Indian National Congress	
Puri	58	Chilka	Debendranath Manasingh	Indian National Congress	
Puri	59	Khurda	Janaki Ballabh Patnaik	Indian National Congress	Elected from two seats, Resigned.
Puri	59	Khurda	Prasanna Kumar Patasani	Independent	Won in 1985 Bypoll.
Puri	60	Begunia	Kailash Chandra Mohapatra	Indian National Congress	
Puri	61	Ranpur	Ramakanta Mishra	Indian National Congress	
Puri	62	Nayagarh	Bhagabat Behera	Janata Party	
Puri	63	Khandapara	Bibhuti Bhusan Singh Mardaraj	Indian National Congress	
Puri	64	Daspalla	Harihar Karan	Indian National Congress	
Ganjam	65	Jaganathprasad (SC)	Damburudhar Sethi	Indian National Congress	
Ganjam	66	Bhanjanagar	Umakanta Misra	Indian National Congress	
Ganjam	67	Suruda	Sarat Chandra Panda	Indian National Congress	
Ganjam	68	Aska	Raghaba Parida	Indian National Congress	
Ganjam	69	Kabisuryanagar	Radha Govinda Sahu	Indian National Congress	
Ganjam	70	Kodala	Ram Krushna Patnaik	Janata Party	
Ganjam	71	Khallikote	V. Sugnana Kumari Deo	Janata Party	
Ganjam	72	Chatrapur	Ashok Kumar Choudhury	Indian National Congress	
Ganjam	73	Hinjili	Udayanath Nayak	Indian National Congress	
Ganjam	74	Gopalpur (SC)	Ghana Syama Behere	Indian National Congress	
Ganjam	75	Berhampur	Sibasankar Sahani	Indian National Congress	
Ganjam	76	Chikiti	Chintamani Dyan Samantara	Indian National Congress	
Ganjam	77	Mohana	Sarat Kumar Jena	Indian National Congress	
Ganjam	78	Ramagiri (ST)	Haladhar Karji	Independent	
Ganjam	79	Parlakhemundi	Trinath Sahu	Indian National Congress	
Koraput	80	Gunupur (ST)	Bhagirathi Gomango	Indian National Congress	
Koraput	81	Bissam-cuttack (ST)	Dambaru Dhar Ulaka	Indian National Congress	
Koraput	82	Rayagada (ST)	Ulaka Rama Chandra	Indian National Congress	
Koraput	83	Lakshmipur (ST)	Anantaram Majhi	Indian National Congress	
Koraput	84	Pottangi (ST)	Chandrama Santha	Indian National Congress	
Koraput	85	Koraput	Nrushimananda Brahma	Indian National Congress	
Koraput	86	Malkangiri (SC)	Nadiabasi Biswas	Independent	
Koraput	87	Chitrakonda (ST)	Gangadhar Madi	Indian National Congress	
Koraput	88	Kotpad (ST)	Basudev Majhi	Indian National Congress	
Koraput	89	Jeypore	Gupta Prasad Das	Indian National Congress	
Koraput	90	Nowrangpur	Habibulla Khan	Indian National Congress	
Koraput	91	Kodinga (ST)	Bhogabati Pujari	Indian National Congress	
Koraput	92	Dabugam (ST)	Domburu Majhi	Indian National Congress	
Koraput	93	Umarkote (ST)	Parama Pujari	Indian National Congress	
Kalahandi	94	Nawapara	Ghasi Ram Majhi	Janata Party	
Kalahandi	95	Khariar	Anup Singh Deo	Indian National Congress	
Kalahandi	96	Dharamgarh (SC)	Jugaram Behera	Indian National Congress	
Kalahandi	97	Koksara	Rahas Bihari Behera	Indian National Congress	
Kalahandi	98	Junagarh	Bikram Keshari Deo	Janata Party	
Kalahandi	99	Bhawanipatna (SC)	Bhakta Charan Das	Janata Party	Resigned on December 1989 on his election to 9th Lok Sabha
Kalahandi	99	Bhawanipatna (SC)	Vacant (Since 7 December 1989)		
Kalahandi	100	Narla (ST)	Kumarmani Sabar	Indian National Congress	
Kalahandi	101	Kesinga	Bhupinder Singh	Indian National Congress	
Phulabani	102	Balliguda (ST)	Laxmikanta Mallik	Indian National Congress	
Phulabani	103	Udayagiri (ST)	Nagarjuna Pradhan	Indian National Congress	
Phulabani	104	Phulbani (SC)	Abhimanyu Behera	Indian National Congress	
Phulabani	105	Boudh	Sujit Kumar Padhi	Indian National Congress	
Balangir	106	Titilagarh (SC)	Purna Chandra Mahananda	Indian National Congress	Expired on 18 May 1989.
Balangir	106	Titilagarh (SC)	Vacant (Since 18 May 1989)		
Balangir	107	Kantabanji	Chaitanya Pradhan	Independent	
Balangir	108	Patnagarh	Sushil Kumar Prushty	Indian National Congress	
Balangir	109	Saintala	Radha Kanta Panda	Indian National Congress	
Balangir	110	Loisingha	Balgopal Mishra	Independent	Resigned on December 1989 on his election to 9th Lok Sabha
Balangir	110	Loisingha	Vacant (Since 7 December 1989)		
Balangir	111	Bolangir	Mahammad Mujafar Hussain Khan	Indian National Congress	
Balangir	112	Sonepur (SC)	Achyuta Biswal	Indian National Congress	
Balangir	113	Binka	Chitaranjan Mishra	Indian National Congress	
Balangir	114	Birmaharajpur	Kartika Prasad Taria	Indian National Congress	
Dhenkanal	115	Athmallik	Amarnath Pradhan	Indian National Congress	
Dhenkanal	116	Angul	Prafulla Misra	Indian National Congress	
Dhenkanal	117	Hindol (SC)	Rabinarayan Naik	Indian National Congress	
Dhenkanal	118	Dhenkanal	Nandini Satpathy	Independent	
Dhenkanal	119	Gondia	Prafulla Kumar Bhanja	Indian National Congress	
Dhenkanal	120	Kamakhyanagar	Prasan Pattanayak	Bharatiya Janata Party	
Dhenkanal	121	Pallahara	Bibhudhendra Pratap Das	Indian National Congress	Resigned on 30 December 1989.
Dhenkanal	121	Pallahara	Vacant (Since 30 December 1989)		
Dhenkanal	122	Talcher (SC)	Bhajaman Behara	Indian National Congress	Disqualified under Anti Defection Law on 15 September 1989.
Dhenkanal	122	Talcher (SC)	Vacant (Since 15 September 1989)		
Sambalpur	123	Padampur	Satyabhusan Sahu	Indian National Congress	
Sambalpur	124	Melchhamunda	Prakashchandra Debta	Indian National Congress	
Sambalpur	125	Bijepur	Nikunja Bihari Singh	Janata Party	
Sambalpur	126	Bhatli (SC)	Mohan Nag	Indian National Congress	
Sambalpur	127	Bargarh	Jadummani Pradhan	Indian National Congress	
Sambalpur	128	Sambalpur	Shraddhakar Supakar	Indian National Congress	
Sambalpur	129	Brajarajnagar	Prasannakumar Panda	Communist Party of India	
Sambalpur	130	Jharsuguda	Birendra Pandey	Indian National Congress	
Sambalpur	131	Laikera (ST)	Hemananda Biswal	Indian National Congress	
Sambalpur	132	Kuchinda (ST)	Jagateshwar Mirdha	Indian National Congress	
Sambalpur	133	Rairakhol (SC)	Abhimanyu Kumar	Indian National Congress	
Sambalpur	134	Deogarh	Raj Kishore Pradhan	Indian National Congress	Resigned on 30 December 1989.
Sambalpur	134	Deogarh	Vacant (Since 30 December 1989)		
Sundergarh	135	Sundargarh	Bharatendra Sekher Deo	Janata Party	
Sundergarh	136	Talsara (ST)	Gajadhar Majhi	Indian National Congress	
Sundergarh	137	Rajgangpur (ST)	Mangala Kisan	Janata Party	
Sundergarh	138	Biramitrapur (ST)	Remish Kerketta	Indian National Congress	
Sundergarh	139	Rourkela	Dilip Ray	Janata Party	
Sundergarh	140	Raghunathpali (ST)	Frida Topno	Indian National Congress	
Sundergarh	141	Bonai (ST)	Basanta Kumar Singh Dandpat	Indian National Congress	
Keonjhar	142	Champua (ST)	Dhanurjay Laguri	Indian National Congress	
Keonjhar	143	Patna	Hrushikesh Naik	Indian National Congress	
Keonjhar	144	Keonjhar (ST)	Chhotaray Majhi	Janata Party	
Keonjhar	145	Telkoi (ST)	Pranaballav Naik	Indian National Congress	
Keonjhar	146	Ramchandrapur	Niranjan Patnaik	Indian National Congress	
Keonjhar	147	Anandapur (SC)	Jayadev Jena	Indian National Congress	

== Bypolls ==
Source
Year	Constituency	Reason for by-poll	Winning candidate	Party
April 1985	Khurda	Resignation of Janaki Ballabh Patnaik	Prasanna Kumar Patasani	Independent
November 1986	Rairangpur (ST)	Death of Bhabendra Nath Majhi	Chaitanya Prasad Majhi	Janata Party
