= Patamundai Assembly constituency =

Former constituency of the Odisha Legislative Assembly

Patamundai
- Former constituency for the Odisha Legislative Assembly

Constituency details
- Country: India
- Region: East India
- State: Odisha
- District: Kendrapara
- Lok Sabha constituency: Kendrapara
- Established: 1951
- Abolished: 2008
- Reservation: SC

Patamundai was an Assembly constituency from Kendrapara district of Odisha. It was established in 1951 and abolished in 1956. It was revived in 1961 and abolished in 2008. After 2008 delimitation, It was subsumed by the Kendrapara & Rajanagar Assembly constituency. This constituency was reserved for Scheduled Caste.

== Elected members ==
Between 1967 & 2008, 12 elections were held.

List of members elected from Patamundai constituency are:

Year	Member	Party
1951	Kumari Ramraj	Independent
1957-1961: Constituency didn't exist
1961	Prahallad Mallik	Indian National Congress
1967	Biswanath Mallik	Praja Socialist Party
1971	Prahallad Mallik	Utkal Congress
1974	Biswanath Mallik	Indian National Congress
1977	Tapas Kumar Das	Janata Party
1980	Biswanath Mallik	Indian National Congress (I)
1985	Ganeswar Behera	Indian National Congress
1990	Radhakanta Sethy	Communist Party of India (Marxist)
1995	Ganeswar Behera	Indian National Congress
2000	Tapas Kumar Das	Biju Janata Dal
2004	Kishore Chandra Tarai	Biju Janata Dal
