= 1985 Orissa Legislative Assembly election =

1985 Assembly election in Odisha, India

1985 Odisha Legislative Assembly election
- March 5, 1985

All 147 seats in the Odisha Legislative Assembly 74 seats needed for a majority
- Registered: 1,53,37,200 (▲10.26%)
- Turnout: 52.27% (▲5.19pp)
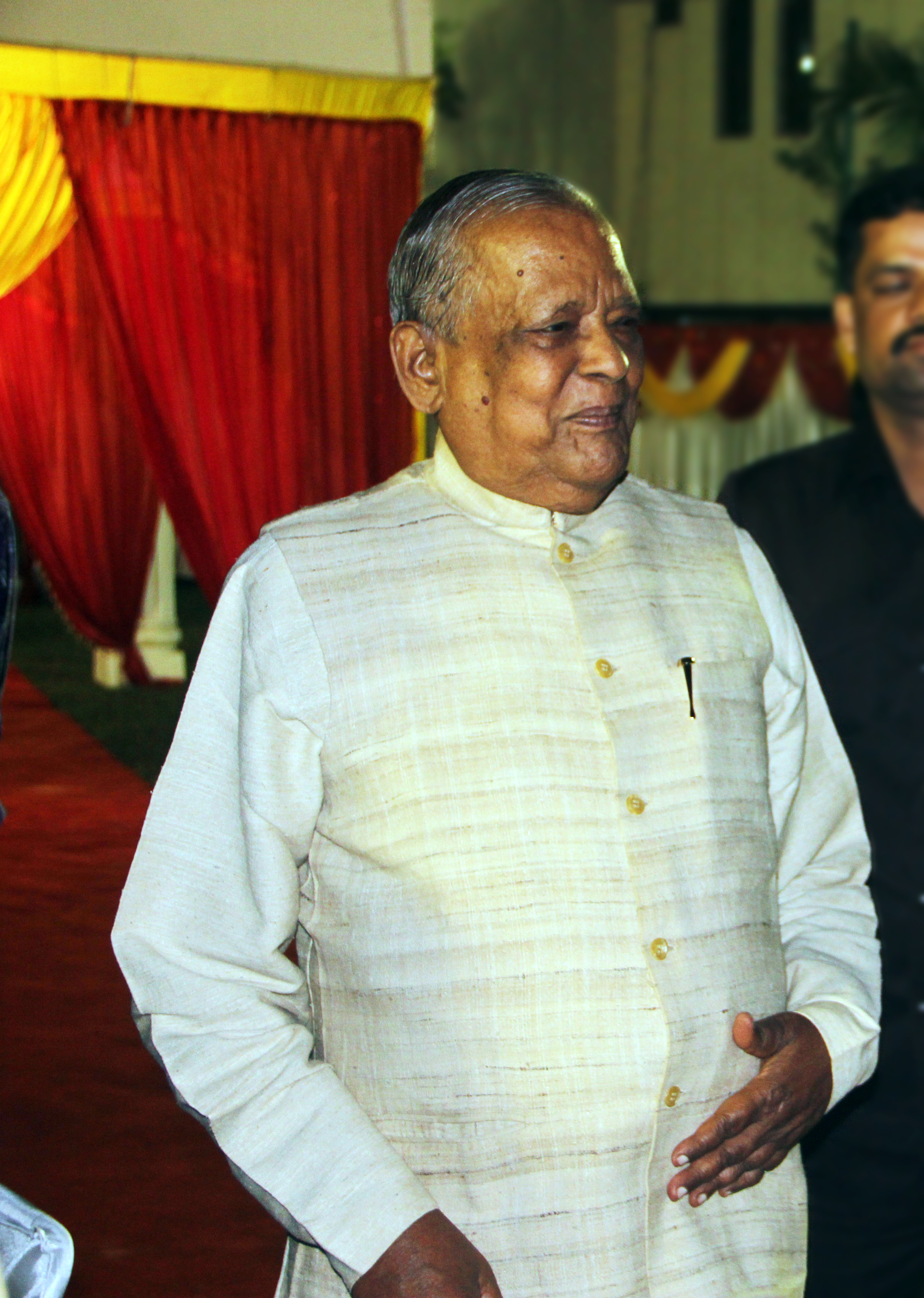

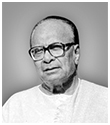
	First party	Second party
Leader	Janaki Ballabh Patnaik	Biju Patnaik
Party	INC	JP
Leader's seat	Athagarh (retained); Khurda (vacanted)	Bhubaneswar
Seats won	117	21
Seat change	▼1	▲18
Popular vote	40,07,258	24,01,566
Percentage	51.08	32.03
Swing	▲3.3	▲26.47
Chief Minister before election
Janaki Ballabh Patnaik
INC(I)
Elected Chief Minister
Janaki Ballabh Patnaik
INC

Elections to the Ninth Odisha Legislative Assembly were held in 1985.

== Constituencies ==
The elections were held for 145 instead of 147 constituencies as a result of some candidates death contesting in Kakatpur and Keonjhar constituency. Out of 147 seats, 22 were reserved for Scheduled Castes, 33 for Scheduled Tribes and 92 for unreserved seats.

== Contesting parties ==
There are seven national parties CPI, INC, BJP, JNP, CPM, ICS and LKD, One state party ICJ three registered unrecognised party Jharkhand Party, JMM and SUC and some Independent Politicians took part in this assembly election. Indian National Congress emerged as the winner by winning 117 seats. Janaki Ballabh Patnaik become the Chief Minister of Odisha and was replaced by Hemananda Biswal for the last few months of this assembly tenure. Biju Patnaik become the Leader of Opposition in the 9th Orissa Assembly.

== Results ==
Source: Election Commission of India
Party				Popular vote			Seats		
Color	Flag	Name	Symbol	Votes	%	±pp	Contested	Won	+/−
		Indian National Congress		4,007,258	51.08	▲3.3	147	117	▼1
		Janata Party		2,401,566	30.61	▲26.47	140	21	▲18
		Communist Party of India		259,508	3.31	▼1.78	27	1	▼3
		Bharatiya Janata Party		204,346	2.60	▲1.24	67	1	▲1
	-	Independents	-	823,850	10.50	▼1.38	374	7	Steady
Total				-	100	-	-	147	-
Valid Votes				7,845,050	51.15				
Invalid Votes				171,533	-				
Total Votes polled / turnout				8,016,583	52.57				
Abstentation				7,320,617	-				
Total No. of Electors				15,337,200					

== Elected members ==
District	AC. No.	Constituency	Member	Party
Mayurbhanj	1	Karanjia (ST)	Karunakar Naik	Indian National Congress
Mayurbhanj	2	Jashipur (ST)	Sambhunath Naik	Independent
Mayurbhanj	3	Bahalda (ST)	Bhagey Gobardhan	Janata Party
Mayurbhanj	4	Rairangpur (ST)	Bhabendra Nath Majhi	Indian National Congress
Mayurbhanj	5	Bangriposi (ST)	Kangoi Singh	Indian National Congress
Mayurbhanj	6	Kuliana (ST)	Saraswati Hembram	Indian National Congress
Mayurbhanj	7	Baripada	Prasanna Kumar Dash	Indian National Congress
Mayurbhanj	8	Baisinga (ST)	Pruthunath Kisku	Indian National Congress
Mayurbhanj	9	Khunta (ST)	Biram Murmu	Indian National Congress
Mayurbhanj	10	Udala (ST)	Ramaneswar Madhei	Indian National Congress
Baleshwar	11	Bhograi	Umarani Patra	Indian National Congress
Baleshwar	12	Jaleswar	Judisthir Jena	Indian National Congress
Baleshwar	13	Basta	Bhupal Chandra Mahapatra	Indian National Congress
Baleshwar	14	Balasore	Gopanarayan Das	Indian National Congress
Baleshwar	15	Soro	Jadunath Das Mohapatra	Indian National Congress
Baleshwar	16	Simulia	Padma Lochan Panda	Indian National Congress
Baleshwar	17	Nilgiri	Sukumar Nayak	Indian National Congress
Baleshwar	18	Bhandaripokhari (SC)	Panchanan Mandal	Indian National Congress
Baleshwar	19	Bhadrak	Jugal Kishore Pattanayak	Indian National Congress
Baleshwar	20	Dhamnagar	Jagannath Rout	Indian National Congress
Baleshwar	21	Chandbali (SC)	Netrananda Malik	Indian National Congress
Baleshwar	22	Basudevpur	Madhu Sadan Panigrahi	Indian National Congress
Cuttack	23	Sukinda	Sarata Rout	Indian National Congress
Cuttack	24	Korai	Ramachandra Khuntia	Indian National Congress
Cuttack	25	Jajpur (SC)	Jagannath Mallick	Janata Party
Cuttack	26	Dharamsala	Kangali Charan Panda	Indian National Congress
Cuttack	27	Barchana	Sitakanta Mahapatra	Indian National Congress
Cuttack	28	Bari-Derabisi	Srikant Kumar Jena	Janata Party
Cuttack	29	Binjharpur (SC)	Nabakishore Mallick	Indian National Congress
Cuttack	30	Aul	Olagobinda Nayak	Indian National Congress
Cuttack	31	Patamundai (SC)	Ganeswar Behera	Indian National Congress
Cuttack	32	Rajnagar	Nalinikanta Mohanty	Janata Party
Cuttack	33	Kendrapara	Bhagabat Prasad Mohanty	Indian National Congress
Cuttack	34	Patkura	Bijoy Mohapatra	Janata Party
Cuttack	35	Tirtol	Nityananda Samntaray	Indian National Congress
Cuttack	36	Ersama	Krushna Chandra Swain	Indian National Congress
Cuttack	37	Balikuda	Jyotish Chandra Das	Indian National Congress
Cuttack	38	Jagatsinghpur (SC)	Kailash Chandra Mallik	Indian National Congress
Cuttack	39	Kissannagar	Batakrishna Jena	Indian National Congress
Cuttack	40	Mahanga	S. K. Matlub Ali	Indian National Congress
Cuttack	41	Salepur (SC)	Mayadhar Sethi	Indian National Congress
Cuttack	42	Gobindpur	Trilochan Kanungo	Independent
Cuttack	43	Cuttack Sadar	Dola Gobind Pradhan	Indian National Congress
Cuttack	44	Cuttack City	Sayad Mustafiz Ahemad	Janata Party
Cuttack	45	Choudwar	Rasananda Sahu	Indian National Congress
Cuttack	46	Banki	Akshaya Kumar Pattanaik	Indian National Congress
Cuttack	47	Athgarh	Janaki Ballabh Patnaik	Indian National Congress
Cuttack	48	Baramba	Lalit Mohan Mohanty	Indian National Congress
Puri	49	Balipatna (SC)	Raghab Chandra Seth	Indian National Congress
Puri	50	Bhubaneswar	Biju Patnaik	Janata Party
Puri	51	Jatni	Suresh Kumar Routray	Indian National Congress
Puri	52	Pipli	Pradeep Maharathy	Janata Party
Puri	53	Nimapara (SC)	Rabindra Kumar Sethy	Indian National Congress
Puri	54	Kakatpur	Surendra Nath Naik	Janata Party
Puri	55	Satyabadi	Rabindra Kumar Das	Indian National Congress
Puri	56	Puri	Braja Kishore Tripathy	Janata Party
Puri	57	Brahmagiri	Gangadhar Mohapatra	Indian National Congress
Puri	58	Chilka	Debendranath Manasingh	Indian National Congress
Puri	59	Khurda	Janaki Ballabh Patnaik	Indian National Congress
Puri	60	Begunia	Kailash Chandra Mohapatra	Indian National Congress
Puri	61	Ranpur	Ramakanta Mishra	Indian National Congress
Puri	62	Nayagarh	Bhagabat Behera	Janata Party
Puri	63	Khandapara	Bibhuti Bhusan Singh Mardaraj	Indian National Congress
Puri	64	Daspalla	Harihar Karan	Indian National Congress
Ganjam	65	Jaganathprasad (SC)	Damburudhar Sethi	Indian National Congress
Ganjam	66	Bhanjanagar	Umakanta Misra	Indian National Congress
Ganjam	67	Suruda	Sarat Chandra Panda	Indian National Congress
Ganjam	68	Aska	Raghaba Parida	Indian National Congress
Ganjam	69	Kabisuryanagar	Radha Govinda Sahu	Indian National Congress
Ganjam	70	Kodala	Ram Krushna Patnaik	Janata Party
Ganjam	71	Khallikote	V. Sugnana Kumari Deo	Janata Party
Ganjam	72	Chatrapur	Ashok Kumar Choudhury	Indian National Congress
Ganjam	73	Hinjili	Udayanath Nayak	Indian National Congress
Ganjam	74	Gopalpur (SC)	Ghana Syama Behere	Indian National Congress
Ganjam	75	Berhampur	Sibasankar Sahani	Indian National Congress
Ganjam	76	Chikiti	Chintamani Dyan Samantara	Indian National Congress
Ganjam	77	Mohana	Sarat Kumar Jena	Indian National Congress
Ganjam	78	Ramagiri (ST)	Haladhar Karji	Independent
Ganjam	79	Parlakhemundi	Trinath Sahu	Indian National Congress
Koraput	80	Gunupur (ST)	Bhagirathi Gomango	Indian National Congress
Koraput	81	Bissam-cuttack (ST)	Dambaru Dhar Ulaka	Indian National Congress
Koraput	82	Rayagada (ST)	Ulaka Rama Chandra	Indian National Congress
Koraput	83	Lakshmipur (ST)	Anantaram Majhi	Indian National Congress
Koraput	84	Pottangi (ST)	Chandrama Santha	Indian National Congress
Koraput	85	Koraput	Nrushimananda Brahma	Indian National Congress
Koraput	86	Malkangiri (SC)	Nadiabasi Biswas	Independent
Koraput	87	Chitrakonda (ST)	Gangadhar Madi	Indian National Congress
Koraput	88	Kotpad (ST)	Basudev Majhi	Indian National Congress
Koraput	89	Jeypore	Gupta Prasad Das	Indian National Congress
Koraput	90	Nowrangpur	Habibulla Khan	Indian National Congress
Koraput	91	Kodinga (ST)	Bhogabati Pujari	Indian National Congress
Koraput	92	Dabugam (ST)	Domburu Majhi	Indian National Congress
Koraput	93	Umarkote (ST)	Parama Pujari	Indian National Congress
Kalahandi	94	Nawapara	Ghasi Ram Majhi	Janata Party
Kalahandi	95	Khariar	Anup Singh Deo	Indian National Congress
Kalahandi	96	Dharamgarh (SC)	Jugaram Behera	Indian National Congress
Kalahandi	97	Koksara	Rahas Bihari Behera	Indian National Congress
Kalahandi	98	Junagarh	Bikram Keshari Deo	Janata Party
Kalahandi	99	Bhawanipatna (SC)	Bhakta Charan Das	Janata Party
Kalahandi	100	Narla (ST)	Kumarmani Sabar	Indian National Congress
Kalahandi	101	Kesinga	Bhupinder Singh	Indian National Congress
Phulabani	102	Balliguda (ST)	Laxmikanta Mallik	Indian National Congress
Phulabani	103	Udayagiri (ST)	Nagarjuna Pradhan	Indian National Congress
Phulabani	104	Phulbani (SC)	Abhimanyu Behera	Indian National Congress
Phulabani	105	Boudh	Sujit Kumar Padhi	Indian National Congress
Balangir	106	Titilagarh (SC)	Purna Chandra Mahananda	Indian National Congress
Balangir	107	Kantabanji	Chaitanya Pradhan	Independent
Balangir	108	Patnagarh	Sushil Kumar Prushty	Indian National Congress
Balangir	109	Saintala	Radha Kanta Panda	Indian National Congress
Balangir	110	Loisingha	Balgopal Mishra	Independent
Balangir	111	Bolangir	Mahammad Mujafar Hussain Khan	Indian National Congress
Balangir	112	Sonepur (SC)	Achyuta Biswal	Indian National Congress
Balangir	113	Binka	Chitaranjan Mishra	Indian National Congress
Balangir	114	Birmaharajpur	Kartika Prasad Taria	Indian National Congress
Dhenkanal	115	Athmallik	Amarnath Pradhan	Indian National Congress
Dhenkanal	116	Angul	Prafulla Misra	Indian National Congress
Dhenkanal	117	Hindol (SC)	Rabinarayan Naik	Indian National Congress
Dhenkanal	118	Dhenkanal	Nandini Satpathy	Independent
Dhenkanal	119	Gondia	Prafulla Kumar Bhanja	Indian National Congress
Dhenkanal	120	Kamakhyanagar	Prasan Pattanayak	Bharatiya Janata Party
Dhenkanal	121	Pallahara	Bibhudhendra Pratap Das	Indian National Congress
Dhenkanal	122	Talcher (SC)	Bhajaman Behara	Indian National Congress
Sambalpur	123	Padampur	Satyabhusan Sahu	Indian National Congress
Sambalpur	124	Melchhamunda	Prakashchandra Debta	Indian National Congress
Sambalpur	125	Bijepur	Nikunja Bihari Singh	Janata Party
Sambalpur	126	Bhatli (SC)	Mohan Nag	Indian National Congress
Sambalpur	127	Bargarh	Jadummani Pradhan	Indian National Congress
Sambalpur	128	Sambalpur	Shraddhakar Supakar	Indian National Congress
Sambalpur	129	Brajarajnagar	Prasannakumar Panda	Communist Party of India
Sambalpur	130	Jharsuguda	Birendra Pandey	Indian National Congress
Sambalpur	131	Laikera (ST)	Hemananda Biswal	Indian National Congress
Sambalpur	132	Kuchinda (ST)	Jagateshwar Mirdha	Indian National Congress
Sambalpur	133	Rairakhol (SC)	Abhimanyu Kumar	Indian National Congress
Sambalpur	134	Deogarh	Raj Kishore Pradhan	Indian National Congress
Sundergarh	135	Sundargarh	Bharatendra Sekher Deo	Janata Party
Sundergarh	136	Talsara (ST)	Gajadhar Majhi	Indian National Congress
Sundergarh	137	Rajgangpur (ST)	Mangala Kisan	Janata Party
Sundergarh	138	Biramitrapur (ST)	Remish Kerketta	Indian National Congress
Sundergarh	139	Rourkela	Dilip Ray	Janata Party
Sundergarh	140	Raghunathpali (ST)	Frida Topno	Indian National Congress
Sundergarh	141	Bonai (ST)	Basanta Kumar Singh Dandpat	Indian National Congress
Keonjhar	142	Champua (ST)	Dhanurjay Laguri	Indian National Congress
Keonjhar	143	Patna	Hrushikesh Naik	Indian National Congress
Keonjhar	144	Keonjhar (ST)	Chhotaray Majhi	Janata Party
Keonjhar	145	Telkoi (ST)	Pranaballav Naik	Indian National Congress
Keonjhar	146	Ramchandrapur	Niranjan Patnaik	Indian National Congress
Keonjhar	147	Anandapur (SC)	Jayadev Jena	Indian National Congress
