= 1995 Orissa Legislative Assembly election =

Assembly elections in Odisha, India

1995 Odisha Legislative Assembly election
- 7 & 9 March 1995

All 147 seats in the Odisha Legislative Assembly 74 seats needed for a majority
- Registered: 2,20,75,775 (▲11.81%)
- Turnout: 73.64% (▲17.01pp)
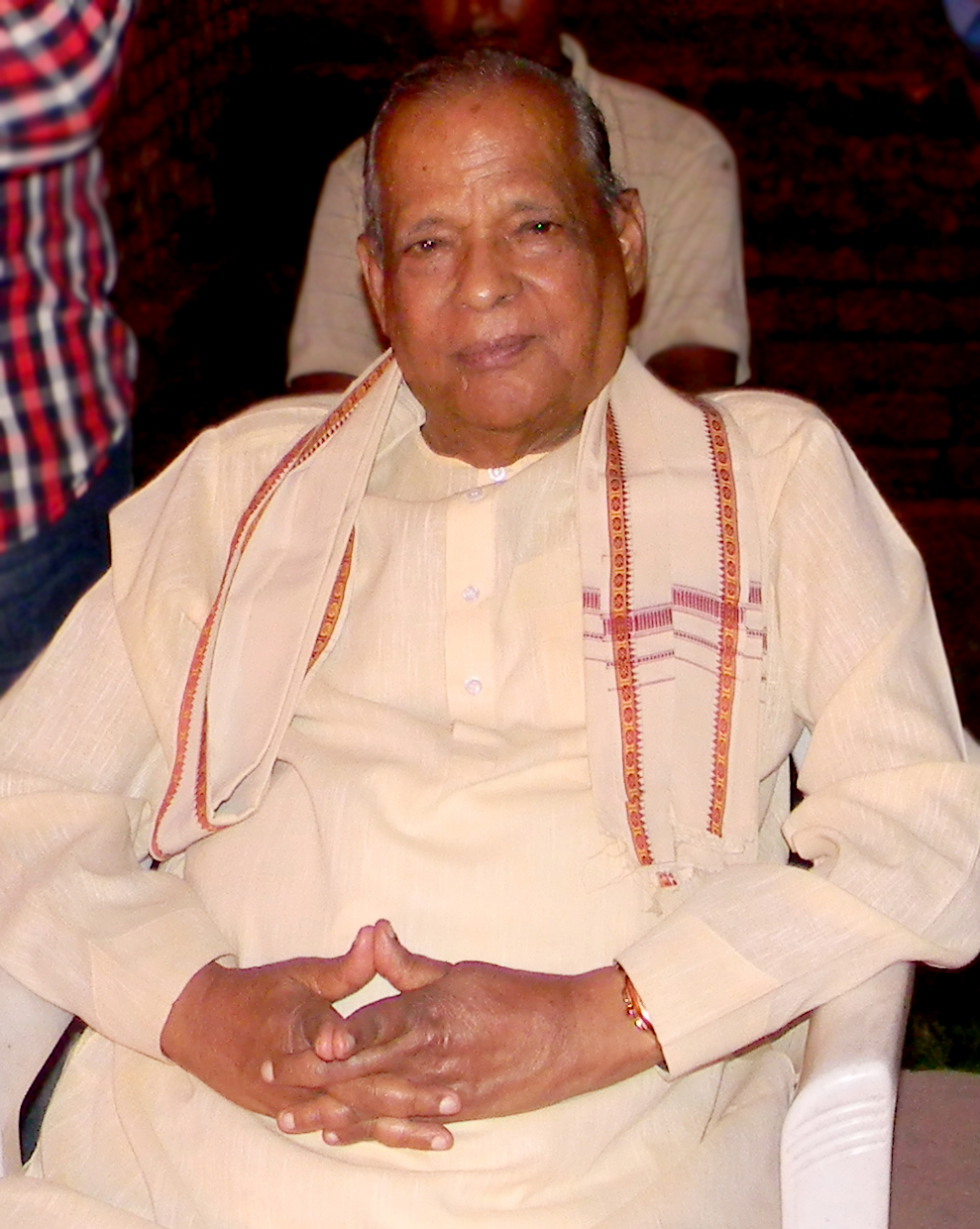

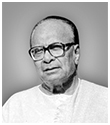
| | Majority party | Minority party |
|---|---|---|
| Leader | Janaki Ballabh Patnaik | Biju Patnaik |
| Party | INC | JD |
| Leader's seat | Begunia | Bhubaneswar |
| Seats before | 5 | 127 |
| Seats won | 80 | 46 |
| Seat change | ▲75 | ▼81 |
| Popular vote | 39.08% | 35.41% |
CM before election
Biju Patnaik
JD
Elected CM
Janaki Ballabh Patnaik
INC

Elections to the Odisha Legislative Assembly were held in March 1995 to elect members of the 147 constituencies in Odisha, India. The Indian National Congress won a majority of seats and Janaki Ballabh Patnaik was appointed as the Chief Minister of Odisha. The number of constituencies was set as 147 by the recommendation of the Delimitation Commission of India.

== Result ==
Source: Election Commission of India
| Party | | | Popular vote | | | Seats | | |
| Flag | Name | Symbol | Votes | % | ±pp | Contested | Won | +/− |
|---|---|---|---|---|---|---|---|---|
| | Indian National Congress | | 6,180,237 | 39.08 | ▲9.3 | 146 | 80 | ▲70 |
| | Janata Dal | | 5,600,853 | 35.41 | ▼18.28 | 146 | 46 | ▼46 |
| | Bharatiya Janata Party | | 1,245,996 | 7.88 | ▲4.32 | 144 | 9 | ▲7 |
| | Communist Party of India | | 2,71,199 | 1.71 | ▼1.27 | 21 | 1 | ▼4 |
| | Jharkhand Mukti Morcha | | 307,517 | 1.94 | ▲1.61 | 16 | 4 | ▲4 |
| - | Jharkhand People's Party | | 27,494 | 0.17 | (new) | 4 | 1 | (new) |
| - | Independents | - | 1,661,485 | 10.51 | ▲3.15 | 682 | 6 | ▲2 |
| Total | | | - | 100 | - | - | 147 | - |
| Valid Votes | | | 15,815,009 | 71.64 | | | | |
| Invalid Votes | | | 440,548 | - | | | | |
| Total Votes polled / turnout | | | 16,255,557 | 73.64 | | | | |
| Abstention | | | 5,820,218 | - | | | | |
| Total No. of Electors | | | 22,075,775 | | | | | |

=== District wise results ===
| District | Seats | | | | | | |
| District | Seats | INC | JND | BJP | JMM | IND | OTH |
| Mayurbhanj | 10 | 5 | 1 | —N/a | 2 | 1 | 1 |
| Balasore | 7 | 4 | 2 | —N/a | —N/a | 1 | —N/a |
| Bhadrak | 5 | 2 | 3 | —N/a | —N/a | —N/a | —N/a |
| Jajpur | 7 | 2 | 5 | —N/a | —N/a | —N/a | —N/a |
| Kendrapara | 5 | 3 | 2 | —N/a | —N/a | —N/a | —N/a |
| Jagatsinghpur | 4 | 3 | 1 | —N/a | —N/a | —N/a | —N/a |
| Cuttack | 10 | 4 | 5 | 1 | —N/a | —N/a | —N/a |
| Khurda | 6 | 3 | 3 | —N/a | —N/a | —N/a | —N/a |
| Puri | 6 | 5 | 1 | —N/a | —N/a | —N/a | —N/a |
| Nayagarh | 4 | 3 | 1 | —N/a | —N/a | —N/a | —N/a |
| Ganjam | 12 | 4 | 6 | 1 | —N/a | 1 | —N/a |
| Gajapati | 3 | 1 | 1 | —N/a | —N/a | 1 | —N/a |
| Rayagada | 3 | 3 | —N/a | —N/a | —N/a | —N/a | —N/a |
| Koraput | 5 | 5 | —N/a | —N/a | —N/a | —N/a | —N/a |
| Malkangiri | 2 | 1 | —N/a | 1 | —N/a | —N/a | —N/a |
| Nowrangpur | 4 | 3 | 1 | —N/a | —N/a | —N/a | —N/a |
| Nawapara | 2 | —N/a | 2 | —N/a | —N/a | —N/a | —N/a |
| Kalahandi | 6 | 1 | 3 | 2 | —N/a | —N/a | —N/a |
| Kandhamal | 3 | 2 | —N/a | —N/a | —N/a | 1 | —N/a |
| Boudh | 1 | —N/a | 1 | —N/a | —N/a | —N/a | —N/a |
| Balangir | 6 | 2 | 2 | 1 | —N/a | 1 | —N/a |
| Subarnapur | 3 | 1 | 2 | —N/a | —N/a | —N/a | —N/a |
| Angul | 5 | 4 | —N/a | 1 | —N/a | —N/a | —N/a |
| Dhenkanal | 3 | 3 | —N/a | —N/a | —N/a | —N/a | —N/a |
| Bargarh | 5 | 3 | 2 | —N/a | —N/a | —N/a | —N/a |
| Sambalpur | 3 | 3 | —N/a | —N/a | —N/a | —N/a | —N/a |
| Jharsuguda | 3 | 2 | —N/a | —N/a | —N/a | —N/a | 1 |
| Deogarh | 1 | —N/a | 1 | —N/a | —N/a | —N/a | —N/a |
| Sundergarh | 7 | 3 | 1 | 1 | 2 | —N/a | —N/a |
| Keonjhar | 6 | 5 | —N/a | 1 | —N/a | —N/a | —N/a |
| Total | 147 | 80 | 46 | 9 | 4 | 6 | 2 |

== Elected members ==
| District | AC. No. | Constituency | Member | Party |
|---|---|---|---|---|
| Mayurbhanj | 1 | Karanjia (ST) | Raghunath Hembram | Janata Dal |
| Mayurbhanj | 2 | Jashipur (ST) | Sambhunath Naik | Independent |
| Mayurbhanj | 3 | Bahalda (ST) | Khelarama Mahali | Jharkhand People's Party |
| Mayurbhanj | 4 | Rairangpur (ST) | Laxman Majhi | Indian National Congress |
| Mayurbhanj | 5 | Bangriposi (ST) | Ajen Murmu | Jharkhand Mukti Morcha |
| Mayurbhanj | 6 | Kuliana (ST) | Sudam Marndi | Jharkhand Mukti Morcha |
| Mayurbhanj | 7 | Baripada | Prasanna Kumar Dash | Indian National Congress |
| Mayurbhanj | 8 | Baisinga (ST) | Pruthunatha Kisku | Indian National Congress |
| Mayurbhanj | 9 | Khunta (ST) | Saraswati Hembram | Indian National Congress |
| Mayurbhanj | 10 | Udala (ST) | Rabaneswara Madhei | Indian National Congress |
| Balasore | 11 | Bhograi | Kamala Das | Janata Dal |
| Balasore | 12 | Jaleswar | Jaynarayana Mohanty | Indian National Congress |
| Balasore | 13 | Basta | Raghunath Mohanty | Janata Dal |
| Balasore | 14 | Balasore | Arun Dey | Independent |
| Balasore | 15 | Soro | Kartika Mohapatra | Indian National Congress |
| Balasore | 16 | Simulia | Padma Lochan Panda | Indian National Congress |
| Balasore | 17 | Nilgiri | Akhyay Kumar Acharya | Indian National Congress |
| Bhadrak | 18 | Bhandaripokhari (SC) | Arjun Charan Sethi | Janata Dal |
| Bhadrak | 19 | Bhadrak | Prafulla Samal | Janata Dal |
| Bhadrak | 20 | Dhamnagar | Jagannath Rout | Indian National Congress |
| Bhadrak | 21 | Chandbali (SC) | Netrananda Mallik | Indian National Congress |
| Bhadrak | 22 | Basudevpur | Bijayshree Routray | Janata Dal |
| Jajpur | 23 | Sukinda | Prafulla Chandra Ghadai | Janata Dal |
| Jajpur | 24 | Korai | Ashok Kumar Das | Janata Dal |
| Jajpur | 25 | Jajpur (SC) | Suryamani Jena | Janata Dal |
| Jajpur | 26 | Dharamsala | Kalpataru Das | Janata Dal |
| Jajpur | 27 | Barchana | Amar Prasad Satpathy | Janata Dal |
| Jajpur | 28 | Bari-Derabisi | Chinmaya Prasada Behera | Indian National Congress |
| Jajpur | 29 | Binjharpur (SC) | Arjuna Das | Indian National Congress |
| Kendrapara | 30 | Aul | Dola Gobinda Nayak | Indian National Congress |
| Kendrapara | 31 | Patamundai (SC) | Ganeswar Behera | Indian National Congress |
| Kendrapara | 32 | Rajnagar | Nalinikanta Mohanty | Janata Dal |
| Kendrapara | 33 | Kendrapara | Bhagabat Prasad Mohanty | Indian National Congress |
| Kendrapara | 34 | Patkura | Bijoy Mohapatra | Janata Dal |
| Jagatsinghpur | 35 | Tirtol | Basanta Kumar Biswal | Indian National Congress |
| Jagatsinghpur | 36 | Ersama | Bijaya Kumar Nayak | Indian National Congress |
| Jagatsinghpur | 37 | Balikuda | Lalatendu Mohapatra | Indian National Congress |
| Jagatsinghpur | 38 | Jagatsinghpur (SC) | Bishnu Charan Das | Janata Dal |
| Cuttack | 39 | Kissannagar | Yudhisthir Das | Janata Dal |
| Cuttack | 40 | Mahanga | Sk. Matlub Alli | Indian National Congress |
| Cuttack | 41 | Salepur (SC) | Rabindra Kumar Behera | Indian National Congress |
| Cuttack | 42 | Gobindpur | Panchanan Kanungo | Janata Dal |
| Cuttack | 43 | Cuttack Sadar | Bijay Lakshmi Sahoo | Indian National Congress |
| Cuttack | 44 | Cuttack City | Samir Dey | Bharatiya Janata Party |
| Cuttack | 45 | Choudwar | Kahnu Charan Lenka | Indian National Congress |
| Cuttack | 46 | Banki | Pravat Tripathy | Janata Dal |
| Cuttack | 47 | Athgarh | Ranendra Pratap Swain | Janata Dal |
| Cuttack | 48 | Baramba | Debiprasad Mishra | Janata Dal |
| Khurda | 49 | Balipatna (SC) | Hrushikesh Nayak | Janata Dal |
| Khurda | 50 | Bhubaneswar | Biju Patnaik | Janata Dal |
| Khurda | 51 | Jatni | Suresh Kumar Routray | Indian National Congress |
| Puri | 52 | Pipli | Yudhistir Samantaray | Indian National Congress |
| Puri | 53 | Nimapara (SC) | Rabindra Kumar Sethy | Indian National Congress |
| Puri | 54 | Kakatpur | Baikunthanath Swain | Indian National Congress |
| Puri | 55 | Satyabadi | Prasad Kumar Harichandan | Indian National Congress |
| Puri | 56 | Puri | Maheswar Mohanty | Janata Dal |
| Puri | 57 | Brahmagiri | Lalatendu Bidyadhar Mohapatra | Indian National Congress |
| Khurda | 58 | Chilka | Debendra Nath Mansingh | Indian National Congress |
| Khurda | 59 | Khurda | Prasanna Kumar Patasani | Janata Dal |
| Khurda | 60 | Begunia | Harihara Sahoo | Indian National Congress |
| Nayagarh | 61 | Ranpur | Ramakanta Mishra | Indian National Congress |
| Nayagarh | 62 | Nayagarh | Sitakanta Mishra | Indian National Congress |
| Nayagarh | 63 | Khandapara | Bibhuti Bhusan Singh Mardaraj | Indian National Congress |
| Nayagarh | 64 | Daspalla | Rudra Madhab Ray | Janata Dal |
| Ganjam | 65 | Jaganathprasad (SC) | Madhaba Nanda Behera | Janata Dal |
| Ganjam | 66 | Bhanjanagar | Bikram Keshari Arukha | Janata Dal |
| Ganjam | 67 | Suruda | Ananta Narayan Singh Deo | Bharatiya Janata Party |
| Ganjam | 68 | Aska | Usha Rani Panda | Indian National Congress |
| Ganjam | 69 | Kabisuryanagar | Harihar Swain | Indian National Congress |
| Ganjam | 70 | Kodala | Ram Krushna Patnaik | Janata Dal |
| Ganjam | 71 | Khallikote | V. Sugnana Kumari Deo | Janata Dal |
| Ganjam | 72 | Chatrapur | Daitari Behara | Indian National Congress |
| Ganjam | 73 | Hinjili | Udayanath Nayak | Indian National Congress |
| Ganjam | 74 | Gopalpur (SC) | Rama Chandra Sethy | Janata Dal |
| Ganjam | 75 | Berhampur | Ramesh Chandra Chyau Patnaik | Janata Dal |
| Ganjam | 76 | Chikiti | Chintamani Dyan Samantara | Independent |
| Gajapati | 77 | Mohana | Surjya Narayan Patro | Janata Dal |
| Gajapati | 78 | Ramagiri (ST) | Haladhar Karjee | Indian National Congress |
| Gajapati | 79 | Parlakhemundi | Trinath Sahu | Independent |
| Rayagada | 80 | Gunupur (ST) | Akshya Kumar Gomango | Indian National Congress |
| Rayagada | 81 | Bissam-cuttack (ST) | Dambarudhar Ulaka | Indian National Congress |
| Rayagada | 82 | Rayagada (ST) | Ulaka Rama Chandra | Indian National Congress |
| Koraput | 83 | Lakshmipur (ST) | Anantaram Majhi | Indian National Congress |
| Koraput | 84 | Pottangi (ST) | Ram Chandra Kadam | Indian National Congress |
| Koraput | 85 | Koraput | Gupta Prasad Das | Indian National Congress |
| Malkangiri | 86 | Malkangiri (SC) | Arabinda Dhali | Bharatiya Janata Party |
| Malkangiri | 87 | Chitrakonda (ST) | Gangadhar Madi | Indian National Congress |
| Koraput | 88 | Kotpad (ST) | Basudev Majhi | Indian National Congress |
| Koraput | 89 | Jeypore | Raghunath Patnaik | Indian National Congress |
| Nowrangpur | 90 | Nowrangpur | Habibulla Khan | Indian National Congress |
| Nowrangpur | 91 | Kodinga (ST) | Sadan Nayak | Indian National Congress |
| Nowrangpur | 92 | Dabugam (ST) | Jadav Majhi | Janata Dal |
| Nowrangpur | 93 | Umarkote (ST) | Parama Pujari | Indian National Congress |
| Nawapara | 94 | Nawapara | Ghasiram Majhi | Janata Dal |
| Nawapara | 95 | Khariar | Duryodhan Majhi | Janata Dal |
| Kalahandi | 96 | Dharamgarh (SC) | Bira Sipka | Janata Dal |
| Kalahandi | 97 | Koksara | Roshini Singh Deo | Janata Dal |
| Kalahandi | 98 | Junagarh | Bikram Keshari Deo | Bharatiya Janata Party |
| Kalahandi | 99 | Bhawanipatna (SC) | Pradipta Kumar Naik | Bharatiya Janata Party |
| Kalahandi | 100 | Narla (ST) | Balabhadra Majhi | Janata Dal |
| Kalahandi | 101 | Kesinga | Bhupinder Singh | Indian National Congress |
| Kandhamal | 102 | Balliguda (ST) | Sahura Mallick | Indian National Congress |
| Kandhamal | 103 | Udayagiri (ST) | Nagarjuna Pradhan | Indian National Congress |
| Kandhamal | 104 | Phulbani (SC) | Dasarathi Behera | Independent |
| Boudh | 105 | Boudh | Satchidananda Dalal | Janata Dal |
| Balangir | 106 | Titilagarh (SC) | Jogendra Behera | Janata Dal |
| Balangir | 107 | Kantabanji | Santosh Singh Saluja | Indian National Congress |
| Balangir | 108 | Patnagarh | Kanak Vardhan Singh Deo | Bharatiya Janata Party |
| Balangir | 109 | Saintala | Surendra Singh Bhoi | Indian National Congress |
| Balangir | 110 | Loisingha | Balgopal Mishra | Independent |
| Balangir | 111 | Bolangir | Ananga Udaya Singh Deo | Janata Dal |
| Subarnapur | 112 | Sonepur (SC) | Kunduru Kushal | Janata Dal |
| Subarnapur | 113 | Binka | Narasingha Mishra | Janata Dal |
| Subarnapur | 114 | Birmaharajpur | Ram Chandra Pradhan | Indian National Congress |
| Angul | 115 | Athmallik | Amarnath Pradhan | Indian National Congress |
| Angul | 116 | Angul | Ramesh Jena | Indian National Congress |
| Dhenkanal | 117 | Hindol (SC) | Maheswar Naik | Indian National Congress |
| Dhenkanal | 118 | Dhenkanal | Nabin Chandra Narayandas | Indian National Congress |
| Dhenkanal | 119 | Gondia | Nandini Satapathy | Indian National Congress |
| Angul | 120 | Kamakhyanagar | Kailash Chandra Mohapatra | Indian National Congress |
| Angul | 121 | Pallahara | Bibhudhendra Pratap Das | Indian National Congress |
| Angul | 122 | Talcher (SC) | Mahesh Sahoo | Bharatiya Janata Party |
| Bargarh | 123 | Padampur | Bijaya Ranjan Singh Bariha | Janata Dal |
| Bargarh | 124 | Melchhamunda | Prakash Chandra Debta | Indian National Congress |
| Bargarh | 125 | Bijepur | Ripunath Seth | Indian National Congress |
| Bargarh | 126 | Bhatli (SC) | Mohan Nag | Indian National Congress |
| Bargarh | 127 | Bargarh | Prasanna Acharya | Janata Dal |
| Sambalpur | 128 | Sambalpur | Durga Shankar Patanaik | Indian National Congress |
| Jharsuguda | 129 | Brajarajnagar | Prasanna Kumar Panda | Communist Party of India |
| Jharsuguda | 130 | Jharsuguda | Birendra Chandra Pandey | Indian National Congress |
| Jharsuguda | 131 | Laikera (ST) | Hemananda Biswal | Indian National Congress |
| Sambalpur | 132 | Kuchinda (ST) | Panu Chandra Naik | Indian National Congress |
| Sambalpur | 133 | Rairakhol (SC) | Abhimanyu Kumar | Indian National Congress |
| Deogarh | 134 | Deogarh | Pradipta Gang Deb | Janata Dal |
| Sundergarh | 135 | Sundargarh | Kishore Chandra Patel | Indian National Congress |
| Sundergarh | 136 | Talsara (ST) | Gajadhar Majhi | Indian National Congress |
| Sundergarh | 137 | Rajgangpur (ST) | Mangala Kisan | Janata Dal |
| Sundergarh | 138 | Biramitrapur (ST) | George Tirkey | Jharkhand Mukti Morcha |
| Sundergarh | 139 | Rourkela | Prabhat Mohapatra | Indian National Congress |
| Sundergarh | 140 | Raghunathpali (ST) | Mansid Ekka | Jharkhand Mukti Morcha |
| Sundergarh | 141 | Bonai (ST) | Jual Oram | Bharatiya Janata Party |
| Keonjhar | 142 | Champua (ST) | Dhanurjay Laguri | Indian National Congress |
| Keonjhar | 143 | Patna | Hrushikesh Naik | Indian National Congress |
| Keonjhar | 144 | Keonjhar (ST) | Jogendra Naik | Bharatiya Janata Party |
| Keonjhar | 145 | Telkoi (ST) | Chandrasena Naik | Indian National Congress |
| Keonjhar | 146 | Ramchandrapur | Niranjan Patnaik | Indian National Congress |
| Keonjhar | 147 | Anandapur (SC) | Jayadev Jena | Indian National Congress |

== Analysis ==
In Orissa, the Janata Dal had won massive landslide victory in 1990 elections by winning 84% of total seats. It completed full 5 year term and in 1995 elections it lost by winning 30% seats, giving way to Congress.

It is believed that one of the main reasons was, the then excise minister Prasanna Acharya banned alcoholic and tobacco products in 1992. It is believed, those who were addicted to it, voted for Congress in following elections of 1995. Congress, after coming to power, withdrew the ban. It justified that State Govt. will earn revenue from this business.

It accused, the JD is depriving the state from economic prosperity and it is prioritising the Coastal Belt instead of Tribal belt. But Congress itself couldn't work for economic progress or Tribal development, when it came to power.

The Janata CM Sri Biju Pattanaik had criticised the tribal districts as, "not even capable of having built a cycle factory, what steel plant would be built?" So JD lost tribal votes.

== See also ==
- List of constituencies of the Odisha Legislative Assembly
- 1995 elections in India
