= 1971 Orissa Legislative Assembly election =

1971 Assembly election in Orissa

- 5 March 1971

All 140 seats in the Orissa Legislative Assembly 71 seats needed for a majority
- Registered: 1,08,51,525 (▲9.91%)
- Turnout: 43.39% (▼0.66pp)

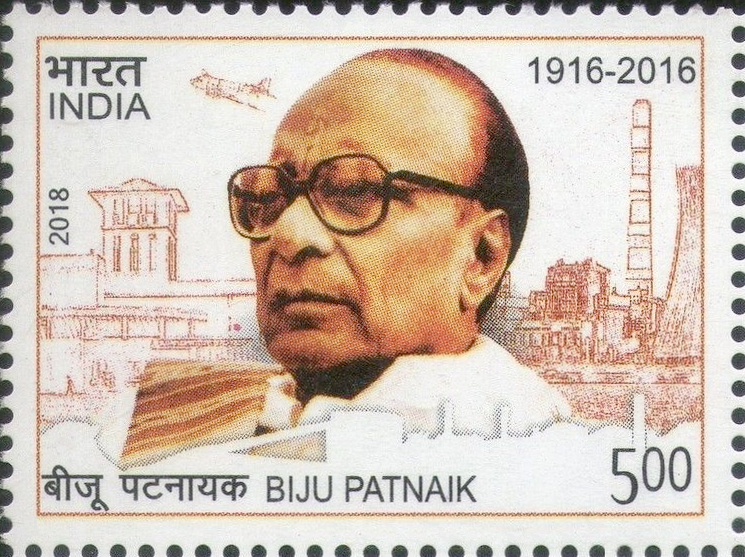
	Majority party	Minority party	Third party
		SWA
Leader	Nandini Satpathy	Rajendra Narayan Singh Deo	Biju Patnaik
Party	INC(R)	SWA	Utkal Congress
Leader's seat	Not contested	Bolangir	Rajanagar (By-elections)
Seats won	51	36	33
Seat change	▲20	▼13	▲33
Popular vote	12,40,668	7,67,815	12,23,014
Percentage	28.18	17.44	23,99
Swing			New Party
Chief Minister before election
Rajendra Narayan Singh Deo
Swatantra Party
Chief Minister
Bishwanath Das
Independent

Elections to the fifth Orissa Legislative Assembly were held in 5 March 1971.

== Constituencies ==
The elections were held for 140 seats. A total of 835 candidates contested for these 140 seats.

== Political parties ==
Three national parties, Communist Party of India, Indian National Congress (R) and Swatantra Party along with the state party Utkal Congress took part in the assembly election. Congress (R) party emerged again as the winner by winning 40% of the seats with a vote share of 28.74%.

== Results ==
Source: Election Commission of India
Party			Popular vote			Seats		
Flag	Name	Symbol	Votes	%	±pp	Contested	Won	+/−
	Indian National Congress (R)		1,240,668	28.18%	▼2.48	129	51	▲20
	Utkal Congress		1,055,826	23.99%	(new)	139	33	(new)
	Swatantra Party		767,815	17.44%	▼5.14	115	36	▼13
	Praja Socialist Party		267,768	6.08%	▼6.18	50	4	▼17
	Communist Party of India		210,811	4.79%	▼0.47	29	4	▼3
	Orissa Jana Congress		227,056	5.16%	▼8.31	66	1	▼25
	Indian National Congress (O)		79,460	1.81%	(new)	50	1	(new)
	Communist Party of India (Marxist)		52,785	1.20%	▲0.04	11	2	▲1
	All India Jharkhand Party		72,291	1.64%	Steady	14	4	Steady
-	Independents	-	332,327	7.55%	▼8.00	190	4	▲1
Total			-	-	-	-	140	-
Valid Votes			4,401,920	40.56				
Invalid Votes			306,454	-				
Total Votes polled / turnout			4,708,374	43.39				
Abstentation			5,694,717	-				
Total No. of Electors			10,851,525					

== Winning candidates ==
District	#	Constituency Name	Winner	Party
Mayurbhanj	1	Karanjia (ST)	Prafulla Kumar Das	Swatantra Party
Mayurbhanj	2	Jashipur (ST)	Lal Mohan Nayak	Indian National Congress (R)
Mayurbhanj	3	Rairangpur (ST)	Siddhalal Murmu	All India Jharkhand Party
Mayurbhanj	4	Bahalda (ST)	Sashi Bhusan Marandi	All India Jharkhand Party
Mayurbhanj	5	Bangriposi (ST)	Radha Mohan Nayak	Swatantra Party
Mayurbhanj	6	Baripada	Pramoda Chandra Bhanjdeo	Independent
Mayurbhanj	7	Muruda (ST)	Kuanria Majhi	Swatantra Party
Mayurbhanj	8	Baisinga (ST)	Prasanna Kumar Dash	Praja Socialist Party
Mayurbhanj	9	Khunta	Birabhadra Singh	Utkal Congress
Mayurbhanj	10	Udala (ST)	Manmohan Tudu	Indian National Congress (R)
Baleshwar	11	Bhograi	Kartikeswar Patra	Indian National Congress (R)
Baleshwar	12	Jaleswar	Prasanta Kumar Pal	Praja Socialist Party
Baleshwar	13	Basta	Chintamani Jena	Utkal Congress
Baleshwar	14	Balasore	Priyanath Nandy	Indian National Congress (R)
Baleshwar	15	Nilgiri	Banamali Das	Communist Party of India (Marxist)
Baleshwar	16	Sore	Jadunath Das Mahapatra	Utkal Congress
Baleshwar	17	Simulia (SC)	Chintamani Jena	Communist Party of India
Baleshwar	18	Bhadrak	Harekrushna Mahatab	Indian National Congress (R)
Baleshwar	19	Dhamnagar	Hrudananda Mallick	Utkal Congress
Baleshwar	20	Chandabali (SC)	Gangadhar Das	Indian National Congress (R)
Baleshwar	21	Basudebpur	Nilamani Routray	Utkal Congress
Cuttack	22	Sukinda	Sanatan Deo	Utkal Congress
Cuttack	23	Dharmasala	Banka Bihari Das	Praja Socialist Party
Cuttack	24	Barchana	Managobinda Samal	Utkal Congress
Cuttack	25	Binjharpur	Pabitramohan Jena	Indian National Congress (R)
Cuttack	26	Jajpur (West)	Prafulla Chandra Ghadei	Indian National Congress (R)
Cuttack	27	Jajpur (East) (SC)	Jaganatha Mallick	Utkal Congress
Cuttack	28	Aul	Sarat Kumar Deb	Swatantra Party
Cuttack	29	Patamundai (SC)	Prahlad Mallik	Utkal Congress
Cuttack	30	Rajanagar	Prahlad Mallik	Utkal Congress
Cuttack	31	Kendrapara	Bhagabat Prasad Mohanty	Praja Socialist Party
Cuttack	32	Patkura	Rajkishore Nayak	Utkal Congress
Cuttack	33	Tirtol	Pratap Chandra Mohanty	Utkal Congress
Cuttack	34	Ersama	Narayana Birabar Samanta	Utkal Congress
Cuttack	35	Balikuda	Basudeba Mohapatra	Indian National Congress (R)
Cuttack	36	Jagatsinghpur (SC)	Laxman Mallick	Indian National Congress (R)
Cuttack	37	Gobindpur	Trilochan Kanungo	Indian National Congress (R)
Cuttack	38	Salepur	Batakrushna Jena	Utkal Congress
Cuttack	39	Mahanga	Sarat Kumar Kar	Utkal Congress
Cuttack	40	Chowdwar	Kanhu Charan Jena	Indian National Congress (R)
Cuttack	41	Cuttack City	Bhairaba Chandra Mohanty	Indian National Congress (R)
Cuttack	42	Cuttack Sadar (SC)	Sura Sethi	Indian National Congress (R)
Cuttack	43	Banki	Gokulananda Praharaj	Utkal Congress
Cuttack	44	Athagarh	Radhanatha Rath	Independent
Cuttack	45	Baramba	Trilochan Harichandan	Swatantra Party
Puri	46	Bhubaneswar	Harekrushna Mahatab	Indian National Congress (R)
Puri	47	Balipatna (SC)	Basanta Behera	Indian National Congress (R)
Puri	48	Pipili	Abhimanyu Ran Singh	Indian National Congress (R)
Puri	49	Nimapara (SC)	Govinda Chandra Sethi	Utkal Congress
Puri	50	Kakatapur	Surendra Nath Naik	Utkal Congress
Puri	51	Satyabadi	Chandramadhaba Mishra	Independent
Puri	52	Puri	Braja Mohan Mohanty	Indian National Congress (R)
Puri	53	Bramhagiri	Gopabandhu Patra	Indian National Congress (R)
Puri	54	Banpur	Ramachandra Praharaja	Swatantra Party
Puri	55	Khurda	Benudhar Baliarsing	Indian National Congress (R)
Puri	56	Begunia	Gangadhara Paikaray	Communist Party of India
Puri	57	Khandapara	Bansidhar Pattnaik	Independent
Puri	58	Daspalla (SC)	Saheb Naik	Indian National Congress (R)
Puri	59	Nayagarh	Achyutananda Mohanty	Utkal Congress
Puri	60	Ranpur	Ramesh Chandra Panda	Communist Party of India (Marxist)
Ganjam	61	Jaganathprasad (SC)	Bacha Naik	Indian National Congress (R)
Ganjam	62	Bhanjanagar	Somanath Rath	Indian National Congress (R)
Ganjam	63	Suruda	Ananta Narayana Singh Deo	Indian National Congress (R)
Ganjam	64	Aska	Krushna Chandra Tripathy	Utkal Congress
Ganjam	65	Kabisuryanagar	Sadananda Mahanty	Communist Party of India
Ganjam	66	Kodala	Ram Krushna Pattanaik	Utkal Congress
Ganjam	67	Khallikote	Trinatha Samantra	Utkal Congress
Ganjam	68	Chatrapur	Lakhmana Mahapatra	Communist Party of India
Ganjam	69	Hinjili	Brundaban Naik	Utkal Congress
Ganjam	70	Dura (SC)	Mohan Nayak	Indian National Congress (R)
Ganjam	71	Berhampur	Binayak Acharya	Indian National Congress (R)
Ganjam	72	Chikati	Satchidananda Deo	Indian National Congress (R)
Ganjam	73	Mohana (ST)	Bhimasena Mandal	Indian National Congress (R)
Ganjam	74	Ramagiri (ST)	Gorosang Soboro	Indian National Congress (R)
Ganjam	75	Paralakhemundi	Darapu Latchanna Naidu	Swatantra Party
Koraput	76	Gunupur (ST)	Bhagirathi Gomango	Indian National Congress (R)
Koraput	77	Bissam Cuttack (ST)	Sripathi Praska	Swatantra Party
Koraput	78	Rayagada (ST)	Raghunatha Himirika	Indian National Congress (R)
Koraput	79	Narayanpatna (ST)	Jogi Tadingi	Indian National Congress (R)
Koraput	80	Nandapur (ST)	Sanu Disari	Utkal Congress
Koraput	81	Malkangiri (ST)	Gangadhar Madhi	Indian National Congress (R)
Koraput	82	Jeypore	Pratap Narayan Singh Deo	Swatantra Party
Koraput	83	Kotpad (ST)	Dhansai Randhari	Swatantra Party
Koraput	84	Nowrangpur	Habibulla Khan	Swatantra Party
Koraput	85	Kodinga (SC)	Purno Chandramirgan	Utkal Congress
Koraput	86	Dabugam (ST)	Dombaru Majhi	Swatantra Party
Koraput	87	Umarkote (ST)	Rabisingh Majhi	Utkal Congress
Kalahandi	88	Nawapara (ST)	Ghasiram Majhi	Swatantra Party
Kalahandi	89	Khariar	Anupa Singh Deo	Indian National Congress (Organization)
Kalahandi	90	Dharmagarh (SC)	Lochan Dhangada Majhi	Swatantra Party
Kalahandi	91	Koksara	Birakesari Deo	Swatantra Party
Kalahandi	92	Junagarh	Trinath Sorab	Swatantra Party
Kalahandi	93	Bhawanipatna (SC)	Dayanidhi Nayak	Swatantra Party
Kalahandi	94	Narla (ST)	Dhaneswar Majhi	Swatantra Party
Kalahandi	95	Kesinga	Bhagaban Bhoi	Swatantra Party
Phulbani	96	Udayagiri (ST)	Gopal Pradhan	Swatantra Party
Phulbani	97	Balliguda (ST)	Naresh Pradhan	Swatantra Party
Phulbani	98	Phulbani (ST)	Jagadish Jani	Indian National Congress (R)
Phulbani	99	Baudh	Natabar Pradhan	Swatantra Party
Balangir	100	Sonepur	Nilambar Raiguru	Swatantra Party
Balangir	101	Binka	Narasingha Mishra	Swatantra Party
Balangir	102	Tusra	Radhamohan Mishra	Swatantra Party
Balangir	103	Bolangir	Rajendra Narayan Singh Deo	Swatantra Party
Balangir	104	Loisinga	Nandakishore Misra	Swatantra Party
Balangir	105	Patnagarh	Ainthu Sahoo	Swatantra Party
Balangir	106	Saintala	Ramesh Chandra Singh Bhoi	Swatantra Party
Balangir	107	Titilagarh (SC)	Tapi Jal	Swatantra Party
Balangir	108	Kantabanji (SC)	Achyutananda Mahananda	Swatantra Party
Sambalpur	109	Padampur	Krupasindhu Bhoi	Indian National Congress (R)
Sambalpur	110	Melchhamunda	Birendra kumar Sahu	Swatantra Party
Sambalpur	111	Bijepur (SC)	Tribikram Mallick	Indian National Congress (R)
Sambalpur	112	Bhatli	Kunja Bihari Naik	Indian National Congress (R)
Sambalpur	113	Bargarh	Chittaranjan Kar	Indian National Congress (R)
Sambalpur	114	Sambalpur	Sriballav Panigrahi	Indian National Congress (R)
Sambalpur	115	Brajarajnagar	Upendra Dikshit	Indian National Congress (R)
Sambalpur	116	Jharsuguda	Jhashaketan Sahu	Indian National Congress (R)
Sambalpur	117	Laikera (ST)	Rameshwar Naik	Indian National Congress (R)
Sambalpur	118	Kuchinda (ST)	Jagateswar Mirdha	Indian National Congress (R)
Sambalpur	119	Rairakhol (SC)	Abhimanyu Kumbhar	Indian National Congress (R)
Sambalpur	120	Deogarh	Bhanugangaa T. Deb Raja	Swatantra Party
Sundargarh	121	Sundargarh	Dibyalochan Sekhar Deo	Indian National Congress (R)
Sundargarh	122	Talsara (ST)	Gangadhar Pradhan	Swatantra Party
Sundargarh	123	Rajgangpur (ST)	Ignace Majhi	All India Jharkhand Party
Sundargarh	124	Bisra (ST)	Kullan Bag	All India Jharkhand Party
Sundargarh	125	Rourkela	Shyam Sundar Mohapatra	Indian National Congress (R)
Sundargarh	126	Bonai (ST)	Hemendra Prasad Mahapatra	Swatantra Party
Keonjhar	127	Champua (ST)	Saharai Oram	Utkal Congress
Keonjhar	128	Patna (ST)	Maheswar Majhi	Utkal Congress
Keonjhar	129	Keonjhar (ST)	Chhotaray Majhi	Utkal Congress
Keonjhar	130	Telkori (ST)	Niladri Nayak	Utkal Congress
Keonjhar	131	Ramachandrapur	Muralidhar Kuanr	Indian National Congress (R)
Keonjhar	132	Anandpur (SC)	Makar Sethi	Indian National Congress (R)
Dhenkanal	133	Pallahara	Narayana Sahu	Indian National Congress (R)
Dhenkanal	134	Kamakhyanagar	Bramhananda Biswal	Indian National Congress (R)
Dhenkanal	135	Gondia	Brundaban Tripathy	Indian National Congress (R)
Dhenkanal	136	Dhenkanal	Surendra Mohan Pattanaik	Indian National Congress (R)
Dhenkanal	137	Talcher (SC)	Brundaban Behera	Orissa Jana Congress
Dhenkanal	138	Chhendipada (SC)	Bhajaman Behera	Utkal Congress
Dhenkanal	139	Angul	Debaraja Sahu	Utkal Congress
Dhenkanal	140	Athamallik	Raja Kishore Pradhan	Utkal Congress

== Government formation ==
The United Front a coalition of Swatantra Party who won 36 Assembly seats and the new regional party Utkal Congress who won 33 Assembly seats formed the government under the leadership of Independent candidate Bishwanath Das.

Das resigned on June 14, 1972, due to defection of a large number of members from the ruling coalition and on same day Nandini Satpathy of the Indian National Congress (R) formed the government and continued till March 1973. Nandini Satpathy ousted due in-fighting of the members after which there was imposition of President's rule in the state.

== See also ==
- 6th Orissa Legislative Assembly
- 1971 elections in India
- 1967 Orissa Legislative Assembly election
- 1974 Orissa Legislative Assembly election
