= Kodala Assembly constituency =

Former constituency of the Odisha Legislative Assembly

Kodala
- Former constituency for the Odisha Legislative Assembly

Constituency details
- Country: India
- Region: East India
- State: Odisha
- District: Ganjam
- Lok Sabha constituency: Aska
- Established: 1951
- Abolished: 2008
- Reservation: None

Kodala was an Assembly constituency from Ganjam district of Odisha. It was established in 1951 and abolished in 2008. After 2008 delimitation, It was subsumed by the Kabisuryanagar Assembly constituency.

== Elected members ==
Between 1951 & 2008, 14 elections were held including one bypoll in 1962. It was a 2-member constituency in 1957 and 1961.

List of members elected from Kodala constituency are:

Year	Member	Party
1951	Banamali Maharana	Socialist Party
1957 (Note: It was a 2 member constituency)	Rama Chandra Mardaraj Deo (Note: from Kodala East)	Indian National Congress
1957	Harihar Das (Note: from Kodala West)	Indian National Congress
1961 (Note: It was a 2 member constituency)	Lingaraj Panigrahi (Note: from Kodala East)	Indian National Congress
1961	Bishwanath Das (Note: from Kodala West)	Indian National Congress
1962 (bypoll) (Note: Resignation of Biswanath Das from Kodala West Seat)	Banamali Maharana	Praja Socialist Party
1967	Banamali Maharana	Praja Socialist Party
1971	Ramakrushna Patnaik	Utkal Congress
1974	Kanhu Charan Naik	Indian National Congress
1977	Ramakrushna Patnaik	Janata Party
1980	Kanhu Charan Naik	Indian National Congress (I)
1985	Ramakrushna Patnaik	Janata Party
1990	Ramakrushna Patnaik	Janata Dal
1995	Ramakrushna Patnaik	Janata Dal
2000	Ramakrushna Patnaik	Biju Janata Dal
2004	Niranjan Pradhan	Biju Janata Dal
