= Jaganathprasad Assembly constituency =

Former constituency of the Odisha Legislative Assembly

Jaganathprasad
- Former constituency for the Odisha Legislative Assembly

Constituency details
- Country: India
- Region: East India
- State: Odisha
- District: Ganjam
- Lok Sabha constituency: Aska
- Established: 1951
- Abolished: 2008
- Reservation: SC

Jaganathprasad was an Assembly constituency from Ganjam district of Odisha. It was established in 1951 and abolished in 1957. It was revived in 1961 and again abolished in 2008. After 2008 delimitation, It was subsumed by the Bhanjanagar Assembly constituency. This constituency was reserved for Schedule Castes.

== Elected members ==
Between 1951 & 2008, 12 elections were held.

List of members elected from Jaganathprasad constituency are:

Year	Member	Party
1951	Biju Patnaik	Indian National Congress
1956-1961: Constituency did not exist
1961	Udia Nayak	Indian National Congress
1967	Udayanath Naik	Indian National Congress
1971	Shribatcha Naik	Indian National Congress
1974	Shribatcha Naik	Utkal Congress
1977	Udaynath Naik	Janata Party
1980	Shribatcha Naik	Indian National Congress (I)
1985	Dambarudhar Sethy	Indian National Congress
1990	Madhaba Nanda Behera	Janata Dal
1995	Madhaba Nanda Behera	Janata Dal
2000	Simanchala Behera	Indian National Congress
2004	Madhaba Nanda Behera	Biju Janata Dal
