= Binka Assembly constituency =

Former constituency of the Odisha Legislative Assembly

Binka
- Former constituency for the Odisha Legislative Assembly

Constituency details
- Country: India
- Region: East India
- State: Odisha
- District: Subarnapur
- Lok Sabha constituency: Bolangir
- Established: 1951
- Abolished: 2008
- Reservation: None

Binka was an Assembly constituency from Subarnapur district of Odisha. It was established in 1951 and abolished in 1957. It was revived in 1961 and abolished in 2008. After 2008 delimitation, It was subsumed by the Birmaharajpur Assembly constituency.

== Elected members ==
Between 1951 & 2008, 11 elections were held.

List of members elected from Binka constituency are:

| Year | Member | Party |
|---|---|---|
| 1951 | Baikunthanath Nepak | All India Ganatantra Parishad |
1957-1961: Constituency didn't exist
| 1961 | Anantaram Nanda | All India Ganatantra Parishad |
| 1967 | Narasimha Charan Mishra | Swatantra Party |
| 1971 | Narasimha Charan Mishra | Swatantra Party |
| 1974 | Radhamohan Mishra | Swatantra Party |
| 1977 | Parikhit Karna | Independent |
| 1980 | Pradeep Hota | Indian National Congress (I) |
| 1985 | Chittaranjan Mishra | Indian National Congress |
| 1990 | Panchanana Mishra | Independent |
| 1995 | Narasingha Mishra | Janata Dal |
| 2000 | Niranjan Pujari | Biju Janata Dal |
| 2004 | Niranjan Pujari | Biju Janata Dal |
