= Gobindpur, Odisha Assembly constituency =

Former constituency of the Odisha Legislative Assembly

Gobindpur
- Former constituency for the Odisha Legislative Assembly

Constituency details
- Country: India
- Region: East India
- State: Odisha
- District: Cuttack
- Lok Sabha constituency: Cuttack
- Established: 1961
- Abolished: 2008
- Reservation: None

Gobindpur was an Assembly constituency from Cuttack district of Odisha. It was established in 1961 and abolished in 2008. After 2008 delimitation, It was subsumed by the Banki Assembly constituency.

== Elected members ==
Between 1961 & 2008, 11 elections were held.

List of members elected from Gobindpur constituency are:

Year	Member	Party
1961	Kanduricharan Mallik	Praja Socialist Party
1967	Muralidhar Kanungo	Orissa Jana Congress
1971	Trilochan Kanungo	Indian National Congress
1974	Sudhansu Malini Ray	Indian National Congress
1977	Panchanan Kanungo	Janata Party
1980	Antaryami Pradhan	Janata Party (Secular)
1985	Trilochan Kanungo	Independent
1990	Rabindra Kumar Mallik	Independent
1995	Panchanan Kanungo	Janata Dal
2000	Panchanan Kanungo	Biju Janata Dal
2004	Rabindra Kumar Mallik	Indian National Congress
