= Sipra Mallick =

Indian politician

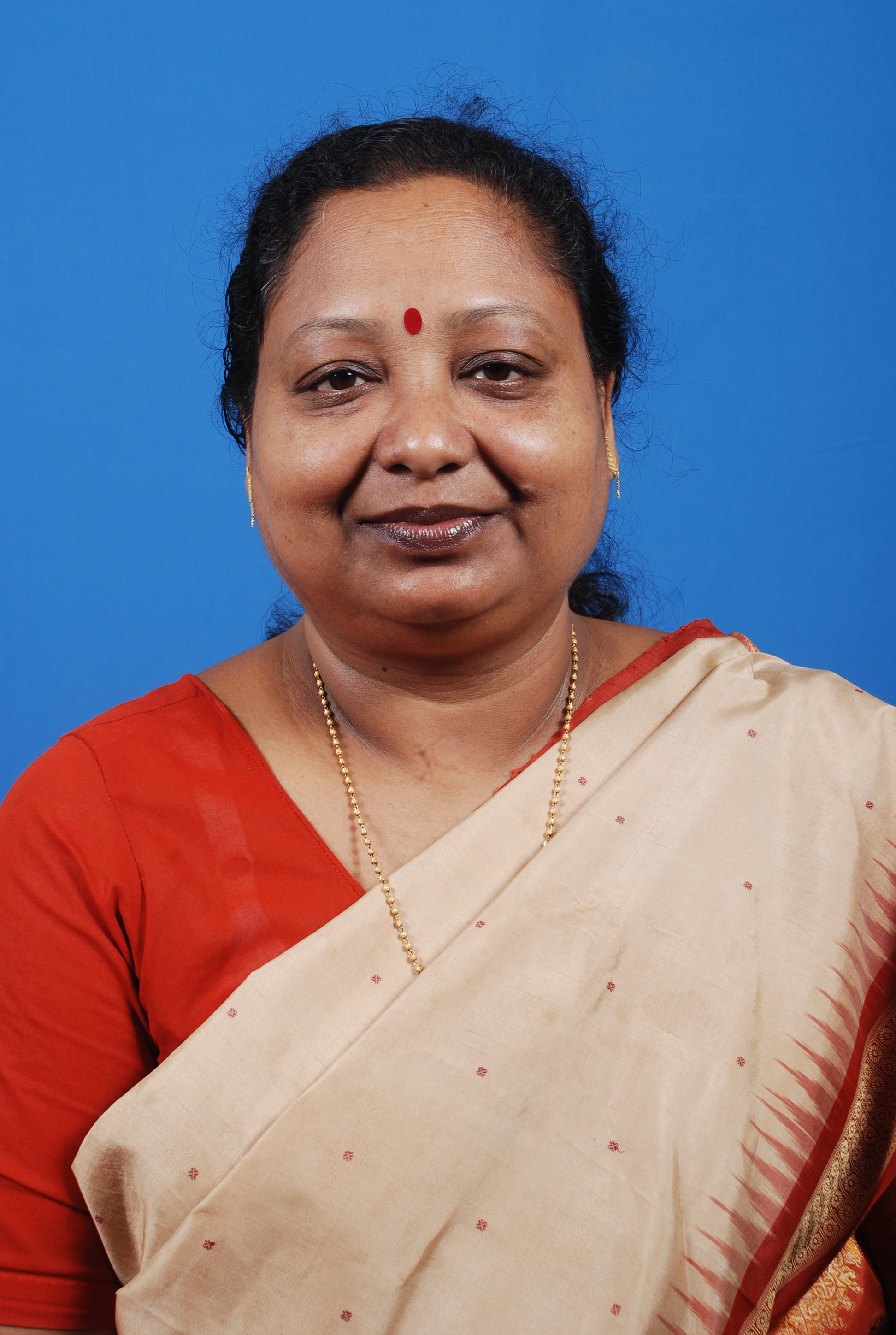

Member of the Odisha Legislative Assembly
- In office 2009-2014
- Preceded by: Utkal Keshari Parida
- Succeeded by: Kishore Chandra Tarai
- Constituency: Kendrapara

Personal details
- Born: September 16, 1961 (age 64)
- Party: Biju Janata Dal
- Other political affiliations: Janata Dal

Sipra Mallick is an Indian politician. She was elected to the Odisha Legislative Assembly as a member of the Biju Janata Dal.
