= Kodinga Assembly constituency =

Former constituency of the Odisha Legislative Assembly

Kodinga
- Former constituency for the Odisha Legislative Assembly

Constituency details
- Country: India
- Region: East India
- State: Odisha
- District: Nabarangpur
- Lok Sabha constituency: Nabarangpur
- Established: 1967
- Abolished: 2008
- Reservation: ST

Kodinga was an Assembly constituency from Nabarangpur district of Odisha. It was established in 1967 and abolished in 2008. After 2008 delimitation, It was subsumed by the Dabugam Assembly constituency. This constituency was reserved for Schedule Tribes.

== Elected members ==
Between 1967 & 2008, 10 elections were held.

List of members elected from Kodinga constituency are:

| Year | Member | Party |
|---|---|---|
| 1967 | Jhitru Nayak | Swatantra Party |
| 1971 | Purna Chandra Mirgan | Utkal Congress |
| 1974 | Sambaru Majhi | Utkal Congress |
| 1977 | Sambaru Majhi | Janata Party |
| 1980 | Dambaru Majhi | Indian National Congress (I) |
| 1985 | Bhagabati Pujari | Indian National Congress |
| 1990 | Shyamaghan Majhi | Janata Dal |
| 1995 | Sadan Nayak | Indian National Congress |
| 2000 | Sadan Nayak | Indian National Congress |
| 2004 | Sadan Nayak | Indian National Congress |
