= Gondia, Odisha Assembly constituency =

Former constituency of the Odisha Legislative Assembly

Gondia
- Former constituency for the Odisha Legislative Assembly

Constituency details
- Country: India
- Region: East India
- State: Odisha
- District: Dhenkanal
- Lok Sabha constituency: Dhenkanal
- Established: 1961
- Abolished: 2008
- Reservation: None

Gondia was an Assembly constituency from Dhenkanal district of Odisha. It was established in 1961 and abolished in 2008. After 2008 delimitation, It was subsumed by the Dhenkanal Assembly constituency.

== Elected members ==
Between 1961 & 2008, 11 elections were held.

List of members elected from Gondia constituency are:

| Year | Member | Party |
|---|---|---|
| 1961 | Kalia Dehuri | All India Ganatantra Parishad |
| 1967 | Haladhar Mishra | Swatantra Party |
| 1971 | Brundaban Tripathy | Indian National Congress |
| 1974 | Sribatsa Nayak | Utkal Congress |
| 1977 | Haladhar Mishra | Janata Party |
| 1980 | Haladhar Mishra | Indian National Congress (Urs) |
| 1985 | Prafulla Kumar Bhanja | Indian National Congress |
| 1990 | Nandini Satpathy | Indian National Congress |
| 1995 | Nandini Satpathy | Indian National Congress |
| 2000 | Nabin Nanda | Biju Janata Dal |
| 2004 | Saroj Kumar Samal | Biju Janata Dal |
