= Baisinga Assembly constituency =

Former constituency of the Odisha Legislative Assembly

Baisinga
- Former constituency for the Odisha Legislative Assembly

Constituency details
- Country: India
- Region: East India
- State: Odisha
- District: Mayurbhanj
- Lok Sabha constituency: Mayurbhanj
- Established: 1957
- Abolished: 2008
- Reservation: ST

Baisinga was an Assembly constituency from Mayurbhanj district of Odisha. It was established in 1957 and abolished in 2008. After 2008 delimitation, It was subsumed by the Badasahi Assembly constituency. It was reserved for the Scheduled Tribes.

== Members of the Legislative Assembly ==
Between 1957 & 2008, 12 elections were held. It was a 2 member constituency for 1957.

List of members elected from Kuliana constituency are:

| Year | Member | Party |
|---|---|---|
| 1957 (Note: It was a 2 member constituency) | Prasanna Kumar Dash | Praja Socialist Party |
| 1957 | Panchanana Das | Indian National Congress |
| 1961 | Arjun Patra | Praja Socialist Party |
| 1967 | Prasanna Kumar Dash | Praja Socialist Party |
| 1971 | Prasanna Kumar Dash | Praja Socialist Party |
| 1974 | Kuanria Majhi | Indian National Congress |
| 1977 | Ramachandra Kisku | Janata Party |
| 1980 | Kuanria Majhi | Indian National Congress (I) |
| 1985 | Pruthunath Kisku | Indian National Congress |
| 1990 | Ananta Charan Majhi | Janata Dal |
| 1995 | Pruthunath Kisku | Indian National Congress |
| 2000 | Kandra Soren | Bharatiya Janata Party |
| 2004 | Pramila Giri | Bharatiya Janata Party |
From 2009 : See Badasahi
