= Koksara Assembly constituency =

Former constituency of the Odisha Legislative Assembly

Koksara
- Former constituency for the Odisha Legislative Assembly

Constituency details
- Country: India
- Region: East India
- State: Odisha
- District: Kalahandi
- Lok Sabha constituency: Kalahandi
- Established: 1961
- Abolished: 2008
- Reservation: None

Koksara was an Assembly constituency from Kalahandi district of Odisha. It was established in 1961 and abolished in 2008. After 2008 delimitation, It was subsumed by the Dharmagarh Assembly constituency.

== Elected members ==
Between 1961 & 2008, 12 elections were held including one bypoll in 1971.

List of members elected from Koksara constituency are:

| Year | Member | Party |
|---|---|---|
| 1961 | Dayanidhi Naik | All India Ganatantra Parishad |
| 1967 | Raghunath Praharaj | Swatantra Party |
| 1971 | Bira Kesari Deo | Swatantra Party |
| 1971 (bypoll) (Note: Resignation of Bira Kesari Deo on his election to Rajya Sabha) | Raghunath Praharaj | Swatantra Party |
| 1974 | Chandrabhanu Singh Deo | Indian National Congress |
| 1977 | Rasabihari Behera | Janata Party |
| 1980 | Manmohan Mathur | Indian National Congress (I) |
| 1985 | Rasabihari Behera | Indian National Congress |
| 1990 | Surendra Pattajoshi | Janata Dal |
| 1995 | Rosni Singh Deo | Janata Dal |
| 2000 | Rosni Singh Deo | Biju Janata Dal |
| 2004 | Pushpendra Singh Deo | Biju Janata Dal |
