= Saintala Assembly constituency =

Former constituency of the Odisha Legislative Assembly

Saintala
- Former constituency for the Odisha Legislative Assembly

Constituency details
- Country: India
- Region: East India
- State: Odisha
- District: Balangir
- Lok Sabha constituency: Bolangir
- Established: 1961
- Abolished: 2008
- Reservation: None

Saintala was an Assembly constituency from Balangir district of Odisha. It was established in 1961 and abolished in 2008. After 2008 delimitation, It was subsumed by the Titlagarh Assembly constituency.

== Elected members ==
Between 1961 & 2008, 11 elections were held.

List of members elected from Saintala constituency are:

Year	Member	Party
1961	Ainthu Sahoo	All India Ganatantra Parishad
1967	Ramesh Chandra Singh Bhoi	Swatantra Party
1971	Ramesh Chandra Singh Bhoi	Swatantra Party
1974	Krushna Chandra Panda	Utkal Congress
1977	Subash Chandra Bag	Janata Party
1980	Ramesh Chandra Singh Bhoi	Indian National Congress (I)
1985	Radhakanta Panda	Indian National Congress
1990	Jagneswar Babu	Janata Dal
1995	Surendra Singh Bhoi	Indian National Congress
2000	Surendra Singh Bhoi	Indian National Congress
2004	Kalikesh Narayan Singh Deo	Biju Janata Dal
