= Kuliana Assembly constituency =

Former constituency of the Odisha Legislative Assembly

Kuliana
- Former constituency for the Odisha Legislative Assembly

Constituency details
- Country: India
- Region: East India
- State: Odisha
- District: Mayurbhanj
- Lok Sabha constituency: Mayurbhanj
- Established: 1974
- Abolished: 2008
- Reservation: ST

Kuliana was an Assembly constituency from Mayurbhanj district of Odisha. It was established in 1974 and abolished in 2008. After 2008 delimitation, It was subsumed by the Bangriposi Assembly constituency. It was reserved for the Scheduled Tribes.

== Members of the Legislative Assembly ==
Between 1974 & 2008, 8 elections were held.

List of members elected from Kuliana constituency are:

Year	Member	Party
1974	Sarat Chandra Singh	Indian National Congress
1977	Niranjan Hembram	Janata Party
1980	Saraswati Hembram	Indian National Congress (I)
1985	Saraswati Hembram	Indian National Congress
1990	Kanhu Soren	Janata Dal
1995	Sudam Marndi	Jharkhand Mukti Morcha
2000	Sudam Marndi	Jharkhand Mukti Morcha
2004	Sananda Marndi	Bharatiya Janata Party
