= Nityananda Samantaray =

Former politician from Odisha, India

- ନିତ୍ୟାନନ୍ଦ ସାମନ୍ତରାୟ

Member of the Odisha Legislative Assembly
- In office 1985–1990
- Preceded by: Basant Kumar Biswal
- Succeeded by: Basant Kumar Biswal
- Constituency: Tirtol

Personal details
- Born: 25 April 1933
- Died: 23 February 2018 (aged 84)
- Citizenship: Indian
- Party: Indian National Congress
- Spouse: Hemalata Samantaray
- Children: Debashish Samantaray (son)
- Parent(s): Bhagaban Samantaray (father); Radhamani Samantaray (mother)
- Occupation: Politician

Nityananda Samantaray (25 April 1933 – 23 February 2018) was an Indian politician who belonged to Odisha. He was active in politics with Indian National Congress, and was elected to Odisha Legislative Assembly from Tirtol Assembly constituency in 1985 Odisha Legislative Assembly election.

== Early life, education and family ==
Samantaray was born on 25 April 1933 to Bhagaban Samantaray and Radhamani Samantaray at Kolar village in Cuttack district.

== Political career ==
Samantaray was active in Odisha politics with the Indian National Congress party and was elected to the 9th Odisha Legislative Assembly from Tirtol Assembly constituency in 1985. Later he contested in 1991 and 1996 Indian general election from Jagatsinghpur Lok Sabha constituency, but defeated both the times.

== Death ==
Samantaray died at 84 on 23 February 2018 due to Cardiac arrest.
