= Kendrapara Assembly constituency =

Constituency of the Odisha legislative assembly in India

Coordinates: 20.49°N 86.42°E

Kendrapara
- Constituency No. 97 for the Odisha Legislative Assembly

Constituency details
- Country: India
- Region: East India
- State: Odisha
- Division: Central Division
- District: Kendrapara
- Lok Sabha constituency: Kendrapara
- Established: 1951
- Total electors: 2,30,413 (Note: as on 2024) (Note: as data published by election commission)
- Reservation: SC

Member of Legislative Assembly
- 17th Odisha Legislative Assembly
- Incumbent Ganeswar Behera
- Party: Biju Janata Dal
- Elected year: 2024

Kendrapara (Sl. No.: 97) is a Vidhan Sabha constituency of Kendrapara district, Odisha.

This constituency includes Kendrapara, Kendrapara block and 12 Gram panchayats (Alapua, Taradipal, Penthapal, Andara, Baluria, Amrutamanohi, Nilakanthapur, Balipatana, Narasinghpur, Badamulabasanta, Dihapada and Singhagan) of Pattamundai block.

== Elected members ==
Vote share of winning candidates
| 2024 | 58.49% |
| 2019 | 43.69% |
| 2014 | 46.93% |
| 2009 | 52.61% |
| 2004 | 50.96% |
| 2000 | 47.90% |
| 1995 | 52.68% |
| 1990 | 60.80% |
| 1985 | 48.28% |
| 1980 | 52.15% |
| 1977 | 62.51% |

Since its formation in 1951, 18 elections were held till date including one bypoll in 1955.

List of members elected from Kendrapara constituency are:

| Year | Member | Party |
|---|---|---|
| 2024 | Ganeswar Behera | Biju Janata Dal |
| 2019 | Shashi Bhusan Behera | Biju Janata Dal |
| 2014 | Kishore Chandra Tarai | Biju Janata Dal |
| 2009 | Sipra Mallick | Biju Janata Dal |
| 2004 | Utkal Keshari Parida | Odisha Gana Parisad |
| 2000 | Bed Prakash Agarwal | Bharatiya Janata Party |
| 1995 | Bhagabat Prasad Mohanty | Indian National Congress |
| 1990 | Bed Prakash Agarwal | Janata Dal |
| 1985 | Bhagabat Prasad Mohanty | Indian National Congress |
| 1980 | Indramani Rout | Indian National Congress (I) |
| 1977 | Bed Prakash Agarwal | Janata Party |
| 1974 | Bed Prakash Agarwal | Utkal Congress |
| 1971 | Bhagabat Prasad Mohanty | Praja Socialist Party |
| 1967 | Sarojakanta Kanungo | Praja Socialist Party |
| 1961 | Dhruba Charan Sahu | Indian National Congress |
| 1957 (Note: It was a 2 member constituency) | Prahlad Mallik | Indian National Congress |
| 1957 | Dinabandhu Sahoo | Indian National Congress |
| 1955 (bypoll) (Note: Resignation of Dinabandhu Sahoo) | Purusottam Nayak | Indian National Congress |
| 1951 | Dinabandhu Sahoo | Indian National Congress |

== Election results ==
=== 2024 ===
Voting were held on 1 June 2024 in 4th phase of Odisha Assembly Election & 7th phase of Indian General Election. Counting of votes was on 4 June 2024. In 2024 election, Biju Janata Dal candidate Ganeswar Behera defeated Bharatiya Janata Party candidate Geetanjali Sethi by a margin of 35,418 votes.

2024 Odisha Vidhan Sabha Election, Kendrapara
| Party | Candidate | Votes | % | ±% |
|---|---|---|---|---|
| BJD | Ganeswar Behera | 90,173 | 58.49 | ▲14.80 |
| BJP | Geetanjali Sethi | 54,755 | 35.52 | ▲20.43 |
| INC | Sipra Mallick | 7,478 | 4.85 | ▼34.49 |
| NOTA | None of the above | 638 | 0.41 | ▲0.09 |
| Majority | | 35,418 | 22.97 | |
| Turnout | | 1,54,166 | 66.91 | |
| BJD hold | | | | |

=== 2019 ===
In 2019 election, Biju Janata Dal candidate Shashi Bhusan Behera defeated Indian National Congress candidate Ganeswar Behera by a margin of 6,585 votes.

2019 Vidhan Sabha Election, Kendrapara
| Party | Candidate | Votes | % | ±% |
|---|---|---|---|---|
| BJD | Shashi Bhusan Behera | 66,132 | 43.69 | |
| INC | Ganeswar Behera | 59,547 | 39.34 | |
| BJP | Sunakar Behera | 22,842 | 15.09 | |
| NOTA | None of the above | 486 | 0.32 | |
| Majority | | 6,585 | 4.35 | |
| Turnout | | 1,51,367 | 69.59 | |
| BJD hold | | | | |

=== 2014 ===
In 2014 election, Biju Janata Dal candidate Kishore Chandra Tarai defeated Indian National Congress candidate Ganeswar Behera by a margin of 5,431 votes.

2014 Vidhan Sabha Election, Kendrapara
| Party | Candidate | Votes | % | ±% |
|---|---|---|---|---|
| BJD | Kishore Chandra Tarai | 65,037 | 46.93 | ▲5.68 |
| INC | Ganeswar Behera | 59,606 | 43.01 | ▲3.82 |
| BJP | Sunakar Behera | 9,981 | 7.2 | ▲1.42 |
| NOTA | None of the above | 682 | 0.49 | − |
| Majority | | 5,431 | 3.92 | |
| Turnout | | 1,38,583 | 71.52 | ▲5.51 |
| Registered electors | | 1,93,764 | | |
| BJD hold | | | | |

=== 2009 ===
In 2009 election, Biju Janata Dal candidate Sipra Mallick defeated Indian National Congress candidate Ganeswar Behera by a margin of 15,931 votes.

2009 Vidhan Sabha Election, Kendrapara
| Party | Candidate | Votes | % | ±% |
|---|---|---|---|---|
| BJD | Sipra Mallick | 62,436 | 52.61 | ▲3.92 |
| INC | Ganeswar Behera | 46,505 | 39.19 | ▲4.28 |
| BJP | Bijay Kumar Mallick | 6,861 | 5.78 | − |
| Majority | | 15,931 | 13.42 (Note: % of total valid votes) | − |
| Turnout | | 1,18,678 | 66.01 | ▲0.86'"`UNIQ−−ref−0000004C−QINU`"' |
| Registered electors | | 1,79,787 | | |
| BJD gain from OGP | | | | |
