= Ramachandra Khuntia =

Indian politician

R. C. Khuntia
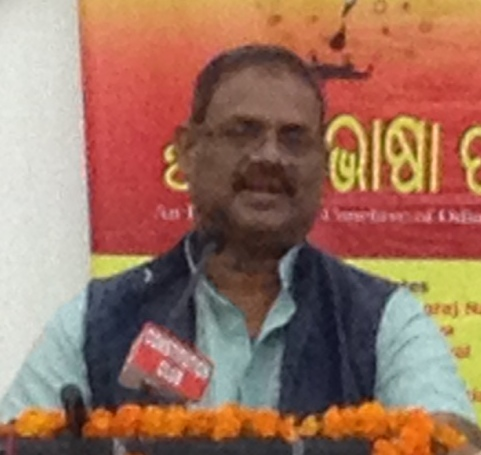

MP of Rajya Sabha for Odisha
- In office 3 April 2008 – 2 April 2014
- Constituency: Odisha
- In office 2 July 1998 – 1 July 2004
- Constituency: Odisha

General Secretary of AICC for Telangana
- In office 1 August 2017 – 12 September 2020
- President: Sonia Gandhi Rahul Gandhi

Personal details
- Born: 10 February 1953 (age 73) Begana, Odisha, India
- Party: Indian National Congress
- Education: Utkal University and Sikkim Manipal University
- Occupation: Politician, advocate, cultivator, educationalist
- Website: khuntia@sansad.nic.in

Rama Chandra Khuntia, usually known as R. C. Khuntia, is an Indian politician. he was a Member of the Rajya Sabha from Odisha from 1998 to 2004 and 2008 to 2014.He serves as the General Secretary of Indian National Congress in charge of Telangana. & the current chairman of International Migrant Workers Working Group of the Geneva based. BWWI. He has many times represented in UN, ILO, MFA, BWI & Solidarity Centrs meetings on action plan for migrant workers. He has also organised Asian Migrant workers in India, Germany, UK & Brussels.

He was elected as the vice-president of IFBWW from 1999 to 2000 as well as the President of the Asia-Pacific Regional Committee of IFBWW. He was a member of the International Executive Board of IFFBW (elected in the World Congress of IFBWW in Zimbabwe). He was a member of the ILO- WHO Joint Committee on Occupational Health. He is the titular member of the IFFBW Asia-Pacific Regional Committee since 1993. He was a delegate in the Closing Ceremony of Global March against Child Labour held in Geneva on 30 May 1998.
