= Ganeswar Behera =

Indian politician

Member of Odisha Legislative Assembly
- Incumbent
- Assumed office 4 June 2024
- Preceded by: Shashi Bhusan Behera
- Constituency: Kendrapara

Personal details
- Political party: Biju Janata Dal
- Profession: Politician

Ganeswar Behera is an Indian politician from Odisha. He is a Member of the Odisha Legislative Assembly from 2024, representing Kendrapara Assembly constituency as a Member of the Biju Janata Dal.

== See also ==
- 2024 Odisha Legislative Assembly election
- Odisha Legislative Assembly
