= Ram Krushna Patnaik =

Indian politician (1940–2021)

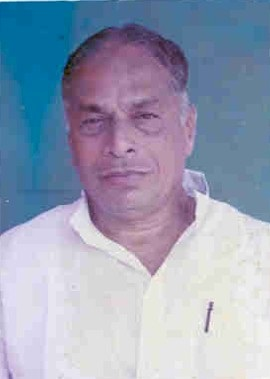
- in 2000s

Personal details
- Born: Ram Krushna Patnaik; 15 August 1940
- Died: 24 December 2021 (aged 81) Bhubaneswar, Odisha, India
- Party: Bharatiya Janata Party
- Other political affiliations: Janata Dal; Biju Janata Dal
- Spouse: Kumudini Patnaik
- Occupation: Advocate,Politician,Social Worker

Ram Krushna Patnaik (15 August 1940 – 24 December 2021) was an Indian politician. He was elected to the Odisha Legislative Assembly from Kodala, Odisha in the 1977, 1980, 1995 and 2000 as a member of the Janata Party, Janata Dal and Biju Janata Dal.

He was Leader of Opposition in Odisha Legislative Assembly from 1996 to 1997. Patnaik died on 24 December 2021, at the age of 81 at his home in Bhubaneswar.
