= 1990 Orissa Legislative Assembly election =

Legislative Assembly election in Odisha, India

1990 Odisha Legislative Assembly election
- February 27, 1990

All 147 seats in the Odisha Legislative Assembly 74 seats needed for a majority
- Registered: 1,97,45,549 (▲28.73%)
- Turnout: 56.63% (▲4.36pp)
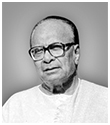

	Majority party	Minority party
Leader	Biju Patnaik	Sarat Pattanayak
Party	JD	INC
Leader since	1985	1989
Leader's seat	Bhubaneswar	Did not contest
Seats before	New	117
Seats won	123	10
Seat change	New	▼107
Popular vote	53.69%	29.78%
CM before election
Hemananda Biswal
INC
Elected CM
Biju Patnaik
JD

Elections to the Orissa Legislative Assembly were held in February 1990 to elect members of the 147 constituencies in Orissa, India. The Janata Party won a majority of seats and Biju Patnaik was appointed as the Chief Minister of Odisha. The number of constituencies was set as 147 by the recommendation of the Delimitation Commission of India.

== Result ==
Source: Election Commission of India
Party				Popular vote			Seats		
Color	Flag	Name	Symbol	Votes	%	±pp	Contested	Won	+/−
		Janata Dal		5,884,443	53.69	(new)	139	123	(new)
		Indian National Congress		3,264,000	29.78	▼21.3	145	10	▼110
		Bharatiya Janata Party		390,060	3.56	▲0.96	63	2	Steady
		Communist Party of India		326,364	2.98	▼0.33	9	5	▲4
		Communist Party of India (Marxist)		91,767	0.84	▼0.3	3	1	▲1
	-	Independents	-	807,000	7.36	▼3.14	389	6	▼1
Total				-	100	-	-	147	-
Valid Votes				10,960,587	55.51				
Invalid Votes				221,565	-				
Total Votes polled / turnout				11,182,152	56.63				
Abstentation				8,563,397	-				
Total No. of Electors				19,745,549					

=== District wise results ===
District	Seats				
District	Seats	JND	INC	IND	OTH
Mayurbhanj	10	8	—N/a	2	—N/a
Baleshwar	12	9	1	1	1
Cuttack	26	23	1	1	1
Puri	16	16	—N/a	—N/a	—N/a
Ganjam	15	11	1	—N/a	3
Koraput	14	11	3	—N/a	—N/a
Kalahandi	8	7	—N/a	—N/a	1
Phulabani	4	3	1	—N/a	—N/a
Balangir	9	8	—N/a	1	—N/a
Dhenkanal	8	6	1	1	—N/a
Sambalpur	12	9	2	—N/a	1
Sundergarh	7	6	—N/a	—N/a	1
Keonjhar	6	6	—N/a	—N/a	—N/a
Total	147	123	10	6	8

== Results by Constituency ==
District	Constituency		%	Winner				Runner-up				Margin	
District	Constituency		%	Candidate	Party	Votes	%	Candidate	Party	Votes	%	Votes	%
Mayurbhanj	1	Karanjia (ST)	46.35	Raghunath Hembram	JD	30,143	61.39	Sukanti Naik	INC	16,721	34.05	13,422	27.34
Mayurbhanj	2	Jashipur (ST)	45.95	Mangal Singh Mudi	JD	19,438	40.88	Sambhunath Naik	IND	14,891	31.32	4,547	9.56
Mayurbhanj	3	Bahalda (ST)	44.54	Khelaram Mahali	IND	20,073	42.22	Nirmal Bhagey	JD	18,597	39.11	1,476	3.11
Mayurbhanj	4	Rairangpur (ST)	45.88	Chaitanya Prasad Majhi	JD	24,011	47.23	Naba Majhi	IND	19,105	37.58	4,906	9.65
Mayurbhanj	5	Bangriposi (ST)	45.29	Sudam Chandra Marndi	IND	14,633	28.43	Purushottam Naik	BJP	10,988	21.35	3,645	7.08
Mayurbhanj	6	Kuliana (ST)	45.59	Kanhu Soren	JD	20,720	39.11	Saraswati Hembram	INC	16,774	31.66	3,946	7.45
Mayurbhanj	7	Baripada	60.67	Chhatish Chandra Dhal	JD	31,114	37.59	Prasanna Kumar Dash	INC	25,335	30.61	5,779	6.98
Mayurbhanj	8	Baisinga (ST)	53.34	Ananta Charan Majhi	JD	30,434	48.82	Kuanria Majhi	INC	24,653	39.55	5,781	9.27
Mayurbhanj	9	Khunta (ST)	58.42	Bira Bhadra Singh	JD	35,387	49.13	Ramesh Soren	INC	20,519	28.49	14,868	20.64
Mayurbhanj	10	Udala (ST)	49.82	Rohidas Soren	JD	26,828	46.68	Durga Charan Tudu	INC	14,317	24.91	12,511	21.77
Baleshwar	11	Bhograi	70.96	Kamala Das	JD	61,687	60.48	Bijaya Kumar Pati	INC	38,845	38.08	22,842	22.40
Baleshwar	12	Jaleswar	68.18	Aswini Kumar Patra	JD	63,644	59.33	Kumar Chakravarty	INC	19,617	18.29	44,027	41.04
Baleshwar	13	Basta	69.72	Raghunath Mohanty	JD	41,654	46.23	Bhupal Chandra	INC	34,852	38.68	6,802	7.55
Baleshwar	14	Balasore	52.76	Arun Dey	CPI	77,904	86.56	Jogendra Prasad Das	UCPI	7,213	8.01	70,691	78.55
Baleshwar	15	Soro	65.67	Kartik Mohapatra	INC	43,460	48.33	Pitamber Panda	CPI	37,458	41.66	6,002	6.67
Baleshwar	16	Simulia	62.18	Parsuram Panigrahi	JD	52,081	64.08	Bhartruhari Mahatab	INC	24,589	30.25	27,492	33.83
Baleshwar	17	Nilgiri	67.08	Chittaranjan Sadangi	IND	31,977	34.38	Pradipta Kumar Panda	CPI(M)	31,917	34.32	60	0.06
Baleshwar	18	Bhandaripokhari (SC)	64.12	Arjun Charan Sethi	JD	56,391	72.25	Purusottam Sethi	INC	20,027	25.66	36,364	46.59
Baleshwar	19	Bhadrak	65.37	Prafulla Samal	JD	53,066	56.62	Jugalkishore Patnaik	INC	35,920	38.33	17,146	18.29
Baleshwar	20	Dhamnagar	67.90	Hrudananda Malliki	JD	52,620	56.21	Jagabandhu Rout	INC	34,384	36.73	18,236	19.48
Baleshwar	21	Chandbali (SC)	65.84	Bairagi Jena	JD	57,040	58.17	Netrananda Mallik	INC	39,776	40.56	17,264	17.61
Baleshwar	22	Basudevpur	71.09	Bijoyshree Routray	JD	54,340	54.44	Purnachandra Nayak	INC	44,129	44.21	10,211	10.23
Cuttack	23	Sukinda	74.15	Prafulla Chandra Ghadai	JD	54,530	54.50	Sarat Rout	INC	32,554	32.54	21,976	21.96
Cuttack	24	Korai	66.86	Ashok Kumar Das	JD	61,138	63.37	Rama Chandra Khuntia	INC	33,630	34.86	27,508	28.51
Cuttack	25	Jajpur (SC)	61.39	Jagannath Mallik	JD	50,118	57.12	Anchal Das	INC	35,951	40.98	14,167	16.14
Cuttack	26	Dharmasala	70.63	Gurcharan Tikayat	JD	52,548	59.48	Kangali Charan Panda	INC	31,133	35.24	21,415	24.24
Cuttack	27	Barchana	72.58	Amar Prasad Satpathy	JD	55,844	55.53	Sitakanta Mohapatra	INC	40,747	40.52	15,097	15.01
Cuttack	28	Bari-Derabisi	65.72	Kulamoni Rout	JD	47,978	56.58	Bhagabat Prasad Mohanty	INC	30,182	35.59	17,796	20.99
Cuttack	29	Binjharpur (SC)	58.53	Pramila Mallik	JD	29,886	38.99	Niranjan Jena	INC	25,616	33.42	4,270	5.57
Cuttack	30	Aul	68.68	Sushree Devi	JD	56,186	56.60	Dolagovinda Nayak	INC	41,276	41.58	14,910	15.02
Cuttack	31	Patamundai (SC)	56.33	Radhakanta Sethy	CPI(M)	35,861	43.96	Prahallad Mallik	INC	23,395	28.68	12,466	15.28
Cuttack	32	Rajnagar	75.51	Nalinikanta Mohanty	JD	58,553	59.20	Bijaya Kumar Pradhan	INC	39,244	39.67	19,309	19.53
Cuttack	33	Kendrapara	69.96	Bed Prakash Agarwala	JD	53,784	60.80	Dillip Misra	INC	29,129	32.93	24,655	27.87
Cuttack	34	Patkura	64.67	Bijay Mohapatra	JD	65,085	72.41	Indramani Rout	INC	18,508	20.59	46,577	51.82
Cuttack	35	Tirtol	73.43	Basanta Kumar Biswal	INC	53,318	50.30	Pratap Chandra Mohanty	JD	51,771	48.84	1,547	1.46
Cuttack	36	Ersama	69.60	Damodar Rout	JD	81,761	71.86	Bijoy Nayak	INC	31,464	27.65	50,297	44.21
Cuttack	37	Balikuda	68.23	Umesh Swain	JD	57,432	62.90	Jyotish Chandra Das	INC	33,869	37.10	23,563	25.80
Cuttack	38	Jagatsinghpur (SC)	65.70	Bishnu Charan Das	JD	59,954	65.36	Lakshman Mallick	INC	30,570	33.33	29,384	32.03
Cuttack	39	Kissannagar	63.28	Yudhisthir Das	JD	37,140	47.35	Gurapada Nanda	INC	20,452	26.07	16,688	21.28
Cuttack	40	Mahanga	74.43	Sarat Kumar Kar	JD	51,089	57.84	Sk. Matlub Ali	INC	36,206	40.99	14,883	16.85
Cuttack	41	Salepur (SC)	62.43	Kalindi Charan Behera	JD	56,088	75.97	Pramod Kumar Jena	INC	14,711	19.92	41,377	56.05
Cuttack	42	Gobindpur	70.58	Rabindra Kumar Mallick	IND	44,751	46.65	Trilochan Kanungo	JD	42,466	44.27	2,285	2.38
Cuttack	43	Cuttack Sadar	55.86	Rajendra Singh	JD	56,824	66.04	Vijayalaxmi Sahoo	INC	25,265	29.36	31,559	36.68
Cuttack	44	Cuttack City	46.84	Sayed Mustafiz Ahmed	JD	56,365	66.39	Samir Dey	BJP	17,238	20.30	39,127	46.09
Cuttack	45	Choudwar	65.11	Raj Kishore Ram	JD	60,866	75.59	Kailash Chandra Baral	INC	19,659	24.41	41,207	51.18
Cuttack	46	Banki	65.30	Ghanashyam Sahoo	JD	46,787	56.08	Jogesh Chandra Rout	IND	31,112	37.29	15,675	18.79
Cuttack	47	Athgarh	61.62	Ranendra Pratap Swain	JD	47,247	56.48	Uma Ballav Rath	IND	25,112	30.02	22,135	26.46
Cuttack	48	Baramba	50.72	Raja Saheb Trilochan Singh Deo	JD	53,677	80.88	Samir Kumar Routray	INC	8,599	12.96	45,078	67.92
Puri	49	Balipatna (SC)	60.89	Hrusikesh Nayak	JD	42,279	59.54	Sura Sethi	INC	19,768	27.84	22,511	31.70
Puri	50	Bhubaneswar	43.10	Biju Patnaik	JD	76,022	80.16	Prasad Kumar Harichandan	INC	14,186	14.96	61,836	65.20
Puri	51	Jatni	64.13	Sarat Chandra Paikray	JD	45,560	53.49	Suresh Kumar Routray	INC	35,790	42.02	9,770	11.47
Puri	52	Pipli	64.73	Pradip Kumar Maharathy	JD	54,397	66.35	Purna Chandra Mishra	INC	24,046	29.33	30,351	37.02
Puri	53	Nimapara (SC)	61.23	Benudhara Sethy	JD	58,540	69.13	Sudam Bhoi	INC	24,174	28.55	34,366	40.58
Puri	54	Kakatpur	73.89	Surendra Nath Naik	JD	58,344	56.21	Baikuntha Nath Swain	INC	41,106	39.60	17,238	16.61
Puri	55	Satyabadi	60.78	Chandramadhab Mishra	JD	39,023	50.51	Rabindra Kumar Das	INC	27,154	35.15	11,869	15.36
Puri	56	Puri	54.91	Braja Kishore Tripathy	JD	64,777	73.20	Belarani Dutta	INC	14,954	16.90	49,823	56.30
Puri	57	Brahmagiri	64.47	Ajay Kumar Jena	JD	47,917	54.15	Gangadhar Mohapatra	INC	28,235	31.91	19,682	22.24
Puri	58	Chilka	63.42	Biswabhusan Harichandan	JD	63,606	68.72	Raghunath Ray	INC	24,120	26.06	39,486	42.66
Puri	59	Khurda	57.08	Prasan Kumar Patsani	JD	53,030	65.37	Rama Chandra Mohapatra	INC	16,897	20.83	36,133	44.54
Puri	60	Begunia	62.36	Surendranath Mishra	JD	51,607	58.80	Kailash Chandra Mohapatra	INC	31,889	36.33	19,718	22.47
Puri	61	Ranpur	63.46	Sarat Chandra Mishra	JD	47,291	54.93	Ramakanta Mishra	INC	35,424	41.15	11,867	13.78
Puri	62	Nayagarh	61.93	Bhagabat Behera	JD	58,434	74.12	Bansidhar Sahoo	INC	19,215	24.37	39,219	49.75
Puri	63	Khandapara	63.11	Arun Kumar Pattnaik	JD	47,904	64.77	Bibhuti Bhusan Singh Mardaraj	INC	23,551	31.84	24,353	32.93
Puri	64	Daspalla	67.36	Rudramadhab Ray	JD	50,165	62.79	Harihar Karan	INC	27,283	34.15	22,882	28.64
Ganjam	65	Jaganathprasad (SC)	53.51	Madhabananda Behera	JD	47,118	64.44	Simanchal Behera	INC	24,664	33.73	22,454	30.71
Ganjam	66	Bhanjanagar	56.62	Rama Krushna Gauda	JD	47,644	63.86	Uma Kanta Misra	INC	25,817	34.61	21,827	29.25
Ganjam	67	Suruda	56.14	Shanti Devi	JD	45,201	57.41	Usha Rani Panda	INC	30,395	38.61	14,806	18.80
Ganjam	68	Aska	55.40	Duti Krushna Panda	CPI	43,816	63.06	Raghaba Parida	INC	22,831	32.86	20,985	30.20
Ganjam	69	Kavisuryanagar	52.21	Nityananda Pradhan	CPI	42,142	55.02	Harihar Swain	INC	28,518	37.23	13,624	17.79
Ganjam	70	Kodala	55.28	Ramakrushna Pattanayak	JD	75,957	92.53	Deenabandhu Nayak	INC	6,132	7.47	69,825	85.06
Ganjam	71	Khallikote	60.70	V. Sugnana Kumari Deo	JD	51,293	59.68	Narayan Sahu	INC	33,699	39.21	17,594	20.47
Ganjam	72	Chatrapur	55.17	Parsuram Panda	CPI	47,321	62.56	Prafulla Chandra Nayak	INC	25,298	33.44	22,023	29.12
Ganjam	73	Hinjili	50.59	Harihar Sahu	JD	32,881	48.22	Udayanath Nayak	INC	27,741	40.68	5,140	7.54
Ganjam	74	Gopalpur (SC)	52.36	Rama Chandra Sethy	JD	39,941	62.83	Ghanasyam Behera	INC	21,133	33.24	18,808	29.59
Ganjam	75	Berhampur	48.13	Binayak Mahapatra	JD	48,576	64.83	Rama Chandra Rath	INC	21,221	28.32	27,355	36.51
Ganjam	76	Chikati	66.03	Usha Devi	JD	53,229	59.93	Chintamani Dyan Samatara	INC	32,651	36.76	20,578	23.17
Ganjam	77	Mohana	46.18	Suriya Narayan Patra	JD	37,334	62.12	Sarat Kumar Jena	INC	9,968	16.59	27,366	45.53
Ganjam	78	Ramagiri (ST)	44.72	Haladhara Karji	INC	21,940	44.21	Ram Chandra Ransingh Nayak	JD	17,772	35.81	4,168	8.40
Ganjam	79	Parlakhemundi	65.24	Darapu Lachana Naidu	JD	51,992	63.21	Basanta Kumar Das	INC	18,647	22.67	33,345	40.54
Koraput	80	Gunupur (ST)	50.27	Ram Murty Gomango	JD	36,203	56.04	Bhagirathi Gomango	INC	26,050	40.32	10,153	15.72
Koraput	81	Bissam-Cuttack (ST)	55.97	Sarangdhar Kadraka	JD	35,419	52.74	Dambarudhar Ulaka	INC	28,621	42.62	6,798	10.12
Koraput	82	Rayaapag (ST)	49.64	Ulaka Ramachandra	INC	37,273	58.30	Lal Bihari Himirika	JD	24,262	37.95	13,011	20.35
Koraput	83	Lakshmipur (ST)	38.67	Akhilla Saunta	JD	21,227	49.91	Ananto Ram Majhi	INC	19,357	45.51	1,870	4.40
Koraput	84	Pottangi (ST)	41.29	Jayaram Pangi	JD	36,831	70.68	Chandrama Santa	INC	10,165	19.51	26,666	51.17
Koraput	85	Koraput	45.48	Harish Chandra Buxi Patra	JD	31,827	55.74	Gupta Prasad Das	INC	15,810	27.69	16,017	28.05
Koraput	86	Malkangiri (SC)	49.94	Naka Kanaya	JD	28,820	45.15	Arabinda Dhali	BJP	25,711	40.28	3,109	4.87
Koraput	87	Chitrakonda (ST)	33.36	Prahallad Dora	JD	22,600	59.18	Gangadhar Madi	INC	11,568	30.29	11,032	28.89
Koraput	88	Kotpad (ST)	45.17	Sadan Naik	JD	24,949	45.41	Basudev Majhi	INC	23,068	41.99	1,881	3.42
Koraput	89	Jeypore	55.34	Raghunath Patnaik	INC	32,947	47.69	Kella Perayya	JD	30,416	44.03	2,531	3.66
Koraput	90	Nowrangpur	61.88	Habibulla Khan	INC	34,790	48.54	Jayadev Kumar Parida	JD	28,984	40.44	5,806	8.10
Koraput	91	Kodinga (ST)	54.54	Shyamaghan Majhi	JD	34,404	58.58	Dambaru Majhi	INC	12,606	21.46	21,798	37.12
Koraput	92	Dabugam (ST)	48.07	Jadav Majhi	JD	46,083	72.29	Phulamani Santa	INC	16,154	25.34	29,929	46.95
Koraput	93	Umarkote (ST)	48.55	Gurubaru Majhi	JD	33,826	56.24	Parama Pujari	INC	20,532	34.14	13,294	22.10
Kalahandi	94	Nawapara	53.85	Ghasiram Majhi	JD	40,997	64.83	Bhanu Prakash Joshi	INC	14,428	22.81	26,569	42.02
Kalahandi	95	Khariar	54.59	Duryodhan Majhi	JD	31,812	49.05	Sushanta Pattanaik	IND	13,495	20.81	18,317	28.24
Kalahandi	96	Dharamgarh (SC)	47.60	Bharat Bhusan Bemal	JD	30,753	54.66	Bhisma Sunani	INC	18,456	32.80	12,297	21.86
Kalahandi	97	Koksara	55.32	Surendra Pattjoshi	JD	26,548	42.17	Ras Behari Behar	INC	13,096	20.80	13,452	21.37
Kalahandi	98	Junagarh	51.20	Bikram Keshari Deo	BJP	25,394	43.02	Ayub Alli Khan	JD	16,126	27.32	9,268	15.70
Kalahandi	99	Bhawanipatna (SC)	44.19	Ajit Das	JD	28,044	49.33	Chandra Naik	INC	23,919	42.08	4,125	7.25
Kalahandi	100	Narla (ST)	42.92	Balabhadra Majhi	JD	30,176	63.91	Kumarmani Sabar	INC	14,142	29.95	16,034	33.96
Kalahandi	101	Kesinga	61.95	Kiran Chandra Singh Deo	JD	38,418	52.91	Bhupindar Singh	INC	28,680	39.50	9,738	13.41
Phulabani	102	Balliguda (ST)	48.72	Bhagaban Konhar	JD	33,686	53.46	Raj Kishore Mallik	INC	22,193	35.22	11,493	18.24
Phulabani	103	Udayagiri (ST)	58.05	Nagarjun Pradhan	INC	38,937	49.78	Rajit Kumar Pradhan	JD	25,972	33.20	12,965	16.58
Phulabani	104	Phulbani (SC)	49.40	Padmanava Behera	JD	42,115	64.00	Abhimanyu Behera	INC	21,990	33.42	20,125	30.58
Phulabani	105	Boudh	61.04	Satchida Nanda Dalal	JD	39,815	51.01	Sujit Kumar Dadhi	INC	24,143	30.93	15,672	20.08
Balangir	106	Titilagarh (SC)	46.90	Jogendra Behera	JD	29,774	54.55	Pankajini Mahanand	INC	15,607	28.59	14,167	25.96
Balangir	107	Kantabanji	49.42	Prasanna Pal	JD	24,857	46.25	Chaitanya Pradhan	INC	11,221	20.88	13,636	25.37
Balangir	108	Patnagarh	55.47	Bibekananda Meher	JD	27,973	43.67	Kanak Vardhan Singh Deo	BJP	26,048	40.66	1,925	3.01
Balangir	109	Saintala	49.77	Jangyeswar Babu	JD	30,669	55.90	Surendra Singh Bhoi	INC	17,555	32.00	13,114	23.90
Balangir	110	Loisingha	59.95	Narasingha Mishra	JD	53,417	74.55	Baishakhu Patel	INC	15,091	21.06	38,326	53.49
Balangir	111	Bolangir	53.85	Ananga Uday Singh Deo	JD	41,406	54.51	Mahammed Muzafar Hussain Khan	INC	22,314	29.37	19,092	25.14
Balangir	112	Sonepur (SC)	46.97	Kunduru Kushal	JD	30,112	49.61	Kartika Taria	INC	14,256	23.49	15,856	26.12
Balangir	113	Binka	61.16	Panchanan Mishra	IND	35,862	41.15	Chandramani Mishra	JD	25,460	29.22	10,402	11.93
Balangir	114	Birmaharajpur	57.73	Rabirarayan Panigrahi	JD	47,645	68.55	Pratyusha Ranjan Mishra	INC	12,573	18.09	35,072	50.46
Dhenkanal	115	Athmallik	53.75	Nagendra Kumar Pradhan	JD	34,347	53.84	Amara Nath Pradhan	INC	22,675	35.55	11,672	18.29
Dhenkanal	116	Angul	52.61	Adwait Prasad Singh	JD	52,749	68.09	Debaraj Sahu	INC	19,407	25.05	33,342	43.04
Dhenkanal	117	Hindol (SC)	50.89	Trinath Nayak	JD	49,712	78.31	Maheswar Naik	INC	13,306	20.96	36,406	57.35
Dhenkanal	118	Dhenkanal	45.01	Tathagata Satpathy	JD	26,214	47.49	Nabin Chandra Narayan Das	IND	13,214	23.94	13,000	23.55
Dhenkanal	119	Gondia	62.61	Nandini Satpathy	INC	37,633	49.37	Haladhar Mishra	JD	32,493	42.63	5,140	6.74
Dhenkanal	120	Kamakhyanagar	60.95	Prasanna Pattnaik	JD	42,703	51.79	Kailash Chandra Mohapatra	INC	37,096	44.99	5,607	6.80
Dhenkanal	121	Pallahara	52.36	Nrusingha Charan Sahoo	JD	55,016	74.94	Narayan Sahu	INC	9,102	12.40	45,914	62.54
Dhenkanal	122	Talcher (SC)	52.26	Brundaban Behera	IND	37,136	44.47	Gopabandhy Naik	INC	20,659	24.74	16,477	19.73
Sambalpur	123	Padampur	56.53	Bijaya Ranjan Singh Bariha	JD	48,217	65.71	Satya Bhusan Sahu	INC	17,807	24.27	30,410	41.44
Sambalpur	124	Melchhamunda	62.12	Murari Prasad Mishra	JD	46,810	62.33	Prakash Chandra Debta	INC	24,933	33.20	21,877	29.13
Sambalpur	125	Bijepur	57.72	Nikunja Bihari Sing	JD	48,934	63.54	Ripunath Seth	INC	22,049	28.63	26,885	34.91
Sambalpur	126	Bhatli (SC)	62.17	Kumar Behera	JD	35,616	45.44	Mohan Nag	INC	26,436	33.73	9,180	11.71
Sambalpur	127	Bargarh	61.78	Prasanna Acharya	JD	63,990	64.85	Jadumani Pradhan	INC	32,955	33.40	31,035	31.45
Sambalpur	128	Sambalpur	49.15	Durga Shankar Patanaik	INC	40,112	45.30	Pramila Bohidar	JD	34,279	38.71	5,833	6.59
Sambalpur	129	Brajarajnagar	55.23	Prasanna Kumar Panda	CPI	44,101	60.76	Sanat Kumar Patjoshi	INC	19,006	26.19	25,095	34.57
Sambalpur	130	Jharsuguda	55.94	Kishore Kumar Mohanty	JD	29,202	38.16	Birendra Pandey	INC	26,907	35.16	2,295	3.00
Sambalpur	131	Laikera (ST)	55.99	Hemananda Biswal	INC	31,177	47.64	Bhabani Shankar Naik	JD	29,540	45.14	1,637	2.50
Sambalpur	132	Kuchinda (ST)	49.75	Brundaban Majhi	JD	36,045	62.05	Jagateswar Mirdha	INC	19,733	33.97	16,312	28.08
Sambalpur	133	Rairakhol (SC)	47.60	Basanta Kumar Mahanada	JD	35,721	60.80	Ashok Kumar Beriha	INC	20,101	34.21	15,620	26.59
Sambalpur	134	Deogarh	42.97	Pradipta Ganga Deb	JD	42,047	72.38	Baba Kishor Patel	INC	9,401	16.18	32,646	56.20
Sundergarh	135	Sundargarh	61.01	Bharatendra Shekhar Deo	JD	51,098	67.04	Kishore Chandra Patel	INC	23,518	30.86	27,580	36.18
Sundergarh	136	Talsara (ST)	48.25	Ranjeet Bhitria	JD	29,925	57.18	Gajadhar Majhi	INC	15,457	29.54	14,468	27.64
Sundergarh	137	Rajgangpur (ST)	48.37	Mangala Kisan	JD	40,674	64.26	Christopher Ekka	INC	14,850	23.46	25,824	40.80
Sundergarh	138	Biramitrapur (ST)	47.66	Satya Narayan Pradhan	JD	21,901	42.61	Remish Kerketta	INC	13,447	26.16	8,454	16.45
Sundergarh	139	Rourkela	45.69	Dilip Kumar Ray	JD	76,520	77.22	Pramod Pradhan	INC	18,507	18.68	58,013	58.54
Sundergarh	140	Raghunathapali (ST)	51.82	Rabidehury	JD	35,611	51.34	Frida Tonpo	INC	25,432	36.67	10,179	14.67
Sundergarh	141	Bonai (ST)	51.64	Jual Oram	BJP	25,921	44.96	Babinarayan Naik	CPI(M)	23,989	41.61	1,932	3.35
Keonjhar	142	Champua (ST)	43.89	Saharai Oram	JD	41,315	73.30	Dhanurjaya Laguri	INC	13,082	23.21	28,233	50.09
Keonjhar	143	Patna (ST)	39.24	Kanhu Charan Naik	JD	32,906	69.41	Hemlata Badanaik	INC	9,009	19.00	23,897	50.41
Keonjhar	144	Keonjhar (ST)	39.99	C. Mahji	JD	30,059	55.20	H. H. Soren	INC	11,762	21.60	18,297	33.60
Keonjhar	145	Telkoi (ST)	40.29	N. Nayak	JD	40,528	72.06	S. Naik	INC	10,573	18.80	29,955	53.26
Keonjhar	146	Ramchandrapur	61.69	Badrinarayan Patra	JD	49,507	60.15	Himadri Nath Jena	INC	14,949	18.16	34,558	41.99
Keonjhar	147	Anandapur (SC)	65.59	Dasarathi Jena	JD	48,947	59.18	Jaydev Jena	INC	33,314	40.28	15,633	18.90

== See also ==
- List of constituencies of the Odisha Legislative Assembly
- 1990 elections in India
