= Fifth Naveen Patnaik ministry =

Government of Odisha (2019 – 2024)

- 29th Ministry of Odisha
- 2019 – 2024
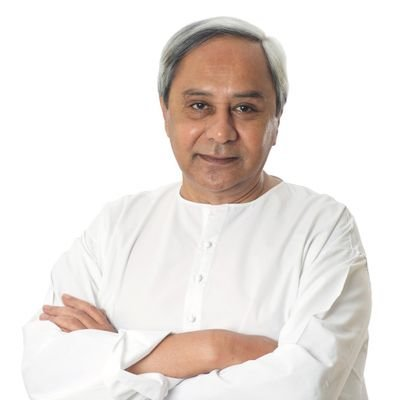
- Naveen Patnaik; Hon'ble Chief Minister of Odisha
- Date formed: 29 May 2019
- Date dissolved: 12 June 2024

People and organisations
- Governor: Ganeshi Lal; Raghubar Das
- Chief Minister: Naveen Patnaik
- No. of ministers: 21
- Member parties: Biju Janata Dal
- Status in legislature: Majority
- Opposition party: Bharatiya Janata Party
- Opposition leader: Pradipta Kumar Naik (2019-2022); Jayanarayan Mishra (2022-2024)

History
- Incoming formation: 16th Odisha Legislative Assembly
- Outgoing formation: 15th Odisha Legislative Assembly
- Election: 2019 Assembly election
- Legislature terms: 5 years, 13 days
- Predecessor: Fourth Naveen Patnaik ministry
- Successor: Mohan Charan Majhi ministry

Naveen Patnaik was elected as Chief Minister of Odisha for a record fifth time in 2019 after securing a landslide victory in 2019 Odisha Legislative Assembly election. The elections were held in the state in four phases coinciding with 2019 Indian general election. The results were declared on 23 May 2019. Biju Janata Dal secured 112 seats out of 147 in the sixteenth Odisha Legislative Assembly. The ministry was informally known as Naveen 5.0.

== Brief history ==
Chief Minister Naveen Patnaik along with 15 Cabinet Ministers and 5 Minister of State with Independent Charges were administered the oath of office and secrecy by Governor Ganeshi Lal at the Raj Bhavan, Bhubaneswar on 29 May 2019.

Entire cabinet was reshuffled on 5 June 2022. All ministers of previous cabinet resigned on 4 June 2022. Odisha Governor Ganeshi Lal administered the oath to the new ministers. Thirteen ministers were sworn in with Cabinet rank while eight were inducted as ministers of state. Nine ministers of the previous cabinet were retained. In a first, five women minister joined the council of ministers.

Further cabinet was expanded with inclusion of 3 new ministers on 22 May 2023.

After a major upset for BJD in 2024 Odisha Assembly election, Shri Patnaik submitted his resignation to Governor on 4 June 2024, paving way for new BJP govt. He continued as Caretaker CM till 12 June 2024.

== Council of Ministers ==
Source
Portfolio	Portrait	Name Constituency	Tenure		Party
Chief Minister; Home; General Administration & Public Grievance; Other departments not allocated to any Minister.		Naveen Patnaik; MLA from Hinjili	29 May 2019	11 June 2024	BJD
Cabinet Minister
Excise		Niranjan Pujari; MLA from Sonepur	29 May 2019	5 June 2022	BJD
Finance		Niranjan Pujari; MLA from Sonepur	29 May 2019	22 May 2023	BJD
Finance		Bikram Keshari Arukha; MLA from Bhanjanagar	22 May 2023	11 June 2024	BJD
Steel & Mines; Works		Prafulla Kumar Mallik; MLA from Kamakshyanagar	29 May 2019	11 June 2024	BJD
Health & Family Welfare		Naba Kishore Das; MLA from Jharsuguda	29 May 2019	14 February 2023	BJD
Health & Family Welfare		Niranjan Pujari; MLA from Sonepur	14 February 2023	11 June 2024	BJD
Agriculture & Farmers Empowerment; Fisheries & Animal Resources Development		Arun Kumar Sahoo; MLA from Nayagarh	29 May 2019	5 June 2022	BJD
Agriculture & Farmers Empowerment; Fisheries & Animal Resources Development		Ranendra Pratap Swain; MLA from Athagarh	5 June 2022	11 June 2024	BJD
Law		Pratap Jena; MLA from Mahanga	29 May 2019	5 June 2022	BJD
Law		Jagannath Saraka; MLA from Bissam Cuttack	5 June 2022	11 June 2024	BJD
S.T. & S.C. Development, Minorities & Backward Classes Welfare		Jagannath Saraka; MLA from Bissam Cuttack	5 June 2022	11 June 2024	BJD
Planning & Convergence		Padmanabha Behera; MLA from Birmaharajpur	29 May 2019	5 June 2022	BJD
Planning & Convergence		Rajendra Dholakia; MLA from Nuapada	5 June 2022	11 June 2024	BJD
Higher Education		Arun Kumar Sahoo; MLA from Nayagarh	29 May 2019	5 June 2022	BJD
Higher Education		Atanu Sabyasachi Nayak; MLA from Mahakalapada	9 June 2023	11 June 2024	BJD
Parliamentary Affairs		Bikram Keshari Arukha; MLA from Bhanjanagar	29 May 2019	5 June 2022	BJD
Parliamentary Affairs		Niranjan Pujari; MLA from Sonepur	5 June 2022	11 June 2024	BJD
Forest & Environment and Climate Change		Bikram Keshari Arukha; MLA from Bhanjanagar	29 May 2019	5 June 2022	BJD
Forest & Environment and Climate Change		Pradip Kumar Amat; MLA from Boudh	5 June 2022	11 June 2024	BJD
Panchayati Raj & Drinking Water		Pratap Jena; MLA from Mahanga	29 May 2019	5 June 2022	BJD
Panchayati Raj & Drinking Water		Pradip Kumar Amat; MLA from Boudh	5 June 2022	11 June 2024	BJD
Information & Public Relations		Pradip Kumar Amat; MLA from Boudh	5 June 2022	11 June 2024	BJD
Housing & Urban Development		Pratap Jena; MLA from Mahanga	29 May 2019	5 June 2022	BJD
Housing & Urban Development		Usha Devi; MLA from Chikiti	5 June 2022	11 June 2024	BJD
School & Mass Education		Sudam Marndi; MLA from Bangriposi	22 May 2023	11 June 2024	BJD
Revenue & Disaster Management		Sudam Marndi; MLA from Bangriposi	29 May 2019	5 June 2022	BJD
Revenue & Disaster Management		Pramila Mallik; MLA from Binjharpur	5 June 2022	21 September 2022	BJD
Revenue & Disaster Management		Ashok Chandra Panda; MLA from Ekamra-Bhubaneswar	21 September 2022	11 June 2024	BJD
Social Security & Empowerment of Persons with Disability; Science & Technology; Public Enterprises		Ashok Chandra Panda; MLA from Ekamra-Bhubaneswar	5 June 2022	11 June 2024	BJD
Co-operation; Food Supplies & Consumer Welfare		Ranendra Pratap Swain; MLA from Athagarh	29 May 2019	5 June 2022	BJD
Co-operation; Food Supplies & Consumer Welfare		Atanu Sabyasachi Nayak; MLA from Mahakalapada	5 June 2022	11 June 2024	BJD
Commerce and Transport		Padmanabha Behera; MLA from Birmaharajpur	29 May 2019	5 June 2022	BJD
Commerce and Transport		Tukuni Sahu; MLA from Titlagarh	5 June 2022	11 June 2024	BJD
Water Resources		Tukuni Sahu; MLA from Titlagarh	5 June 2022	11 June 2024	BJD
Women & Child Development; Mission Shakti		Tukuni Sahu; MLA from Titlagarh	29 May 2019	5 June 2022	BJD
Energy; Industries; Micro, Small & Medium Enterprises		Pratap Keshari Deb; MLA from Aul	5 June 2022	11 June 2024	BJD
Rural Development		Susanta Singh; MLA from Bhatli	29 May 2019	5 June 2022	BJD
Labour & Employees' State Insurance		Susanta Singh; MLA from Bhatli	29 May 2019	5 June 2022	BJD
Labour & Employees' State Insurance		Srikanta Sahu; MLA from Polasara	5 June 2022	22 May 2023	BJD
Labour & Employees' State Insurance		Sarada Prashad Nayak; MLA from Rourkela	22 May 2023	11 June 2024	BJD
Ministers of State with Independent Charges
S.T. & S.C. Development, Minorities & Backward Classes Welfare		Jagannath Saraka; MLA from Bissam Cuttack	29 May 2019	5 June 2022	BJD
Social Security & Empowerment of Persons with Disability; Science & Technology; Public Enterprises		Ashok Chandra Panda; MLA from Ekamra Bhubaneswar	29 May 2019	5 June 2022	BJD
Electronics & Information Technology; Sports & Youth Services		Tusharkanti Behera; MLA from Kakatpur	29 May 2019	11 June 2024	BJD
School & Mass Education		Samir Ranjan Dash; MLA from Nimapara	29 May 2019	22 May 2023	BJD
Information & Public Relations; Water Resources		Raghunandan Das; MLA from Balikuda-Erasama	29 May 2019	5 June 2022	BJD
Energy; Industries; Micro, Small & Medium Enterprises		Dibya Shankar Mishra; MLA from Junagarh	29 May 2019	5 June 2022	BJD
Odia Language, Literature & Culture; Tourism		Jyoti Prakash Panigrahi; MLA from Simulia	29 May 2019	5 June 2022	BJD
Odia Language, Literature & Culture; Tourism		Aswini Kumar Patra; MLA from Jaleswar	5 June 2022	11 June 2024	BJD
Excise		Aswini Kumar Patra; MLA from Jaleswar	5 June 2022	11 June 2024	BJD
Skill Development & Technical Education		Premananda Nayak; MLA from Telkoi	29 May 2019	5 June 2022	BJD
Skill Development & Technical Education		Pritiranjan Gharai; MLA from Sukinda	5 June 2022	11 June 2024	BJD
Rural Development		Pritiranjan Gharai; MLA from Sukinda	5 June 2022	11 June 2024	BJD
Handlooms, Textiles & Handicrafts		Padmini Dian; MLA from Kotpad	29 May 2019	5 June 2022	BJD
Handlooms, Textiles & Handicrafts		Rita Sahu; MLA from Bijepur	5 June 2022	11 June 2024	BJD
Women & Child Development; Mission Shakti		Basanti Hembram; MLA from Karanjia	5 June 2022	11 June 2024	BJD
Higher Education		Rohit Pujari; MLA from Rairakhol	5 June 2022	9 June 2023	BJD
Ministers of State
Home		Dibya Shankar Mishra; MLA from Junagarh	29 May 2019	5 June 2022	BJD
Home		Tusharkanti Behera; MLA from Kakatpur	5 June 2022	11 June 2024	BJD

== Demographics ==
Division	District	Ministers	Cabinet Ministers	Ministers of State
Northern	Angul	0	–	–
Northern	Balangir	1	Tukuni Sahu	–
Northern	Bargarh	2	Susanta Singh	Rita Sahu
Northern	Boudh	1	Pradip Kumar Amat	–
Northern	Dhenkanal	1	Prafulla Kumar Mallik	–
Northern	Deogarh	0	–	–
Northern	Jharsuguda	1	Naba Kishore Das	–
Northern	Keonjhar	1	–	Premananda Nayak
Northern	Nuapada	1	Rajendra Dholakia	–
Northern	Subarnapur	2	Niranjan Pujari; Padmanabha Behera	–
Northern	Sambalpur	1	–	Rohit Pujari
Northern	Sundergarh	1	Sarada Prashad Nayak	–
Central	Balasore	2	–	Aswini Kumar Patra; Jyoti Prakash Panigrahi
Central	Bhadrak	0	–	–
Central	Cuttack	2	Ranendra Pratap Swain; Pratap Jena	–
Central	Jagatsinghpur	1	–	Raghunandan Das
Central	Jajpur	2	Pramila Mallik	Pritiranjan Gharai
Central	Khorda	1	Ashok Chandra Panda	–
Central	Kendrapara	2	Atanu Sabyasachi Nayak; Pratap Keshari Deb	–
Central	Mayurbhanj	2	Sudam Marndi	Basanti Hembram
Central	Nayagarh	1	Arun Kumar Sahoo	–
Central	Puri	2	–	Tusharkanti Behera; Samir Ranjan Dash
Southern	Gajapati	0	–	–
Southern	Ganjam	4	Naveen Patnaik (Chief Minister); Bikram Keshari Arukha; Usha Devi; Srikanta Sahu	–
Southern	Kalahandi	1	–	Dibya Shankar Mishra
Southern	Kandhamal	0	–	–
Southern	Koraput	1	–	Padmini Dian
Southern	Malkangiri	0	–	–
Southern	Nabarangpur	0	–	–
Southern	Rayagada	1	Jagannath Saraka	–

== See also ==
- First Naveen Patnaik ministry
- Mohan Charan Majhi ministry
