= Pravati Parida =

Deputy Chief Minister of Odisha

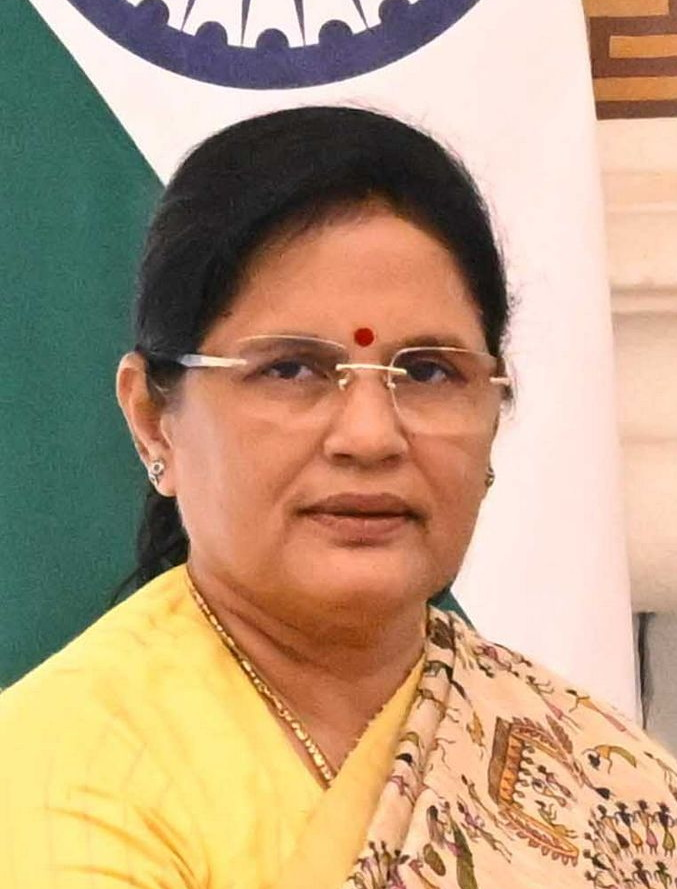
- Parida in 2025

5th Deputy Chief Minister of Odisha
- Incumbent
- Assumed office 12 June 2024 Serving with Kanak Vardhan Singh Deo
- Governor: Raghubar Das; Kambhampati Hari Babu
- Chief Minister: Mohan Charan Majhi
- Preceded by: Basant Kumar Biswal (2000)

Minister of Women & Child Development and Mission Shakti
- Incumbent
- Assumed office 12 June 2024
- Chief Minister: Mohan Charan Majhi
- Preceded by: Basanti Hembram

Minister of Tourism
- Incumbent
- Assumed office 12 June 2024
- Preceded by: Aswini Kumar Patra

Member of the Odisha Legislative Assembly
- Incumbent
- Assumed office 4 June 2024
- Preceded by: Samir Ranjan Dash
- Constituency: Nimapara

Personal details
- Born: 12 May 1966 (age 60) Nimapara, Puri district, Odisha, India
- Party: Bharatiya Janata Party
- Spouse: Shyam Sundar Nayak
- Education: LL.B., M.A. (Public Administration)
- Alma mater: Utkal University
- Profession: Advocate, Social Worker

Pravati Parida (born 12 May 1966) is an Indian politician and advocate from Odisha. She is currently serving as the 5th Deputy Chief Minister of Odisha (the first woman to hold the post) in the Mohan Charan Majhi ministry since June 2024. She also holds the cabinet portfolios for Women and Child Development, Mission Shakti, and Tourism.

She represents the Nimapara constituency in the Odisha Legislative Assembly, having defeated the Biju Janata Dal candidate in the 2024 Odisha Legislative Assembly election. Prior to entering active politics, she served as a government employee and practiced law at the Orissa High Court.

== Early life and education ==
Parida is from Nimapara. She married Shyam Sundar Nayak, a former government servant. She completed her LLB at Utkal University in 1995 and enrolled as an advocate in Odisha High Court, in the same year for some time. Later, she also did M.A. in Public Administration in 2005, also from Utkal University.

== Career ==
Parida won the Nimapara Assembly constituency representing Bharatiya Janata Party in the 2024 Odisha Legislative Assembly election. She polled 95,430 votes and defeated Dilip Kumar Nayak of Biju Janata Dal by a narrow margin of 4,588 votes.

On 12 June 2024, she took oath as Deputy Chief Minister of Odisha along with Kanak Vardhan Singh Deo and Mohan Charan Majhi as chief minister at Janata Maidan, Bhubaneswar. Governor Raghubar Das administered their oath. Prime minister Narendra Modi, home minister Amit Shah, defence minister Rajnath Singh, along with chief ministers of 10 BJP-ruled states were present. She became the first female deputy CM of Odisha.
