= Majhi ministry =

Incumbent Government of Odisha

- 30th Ministry of Odisha
- Incumbent
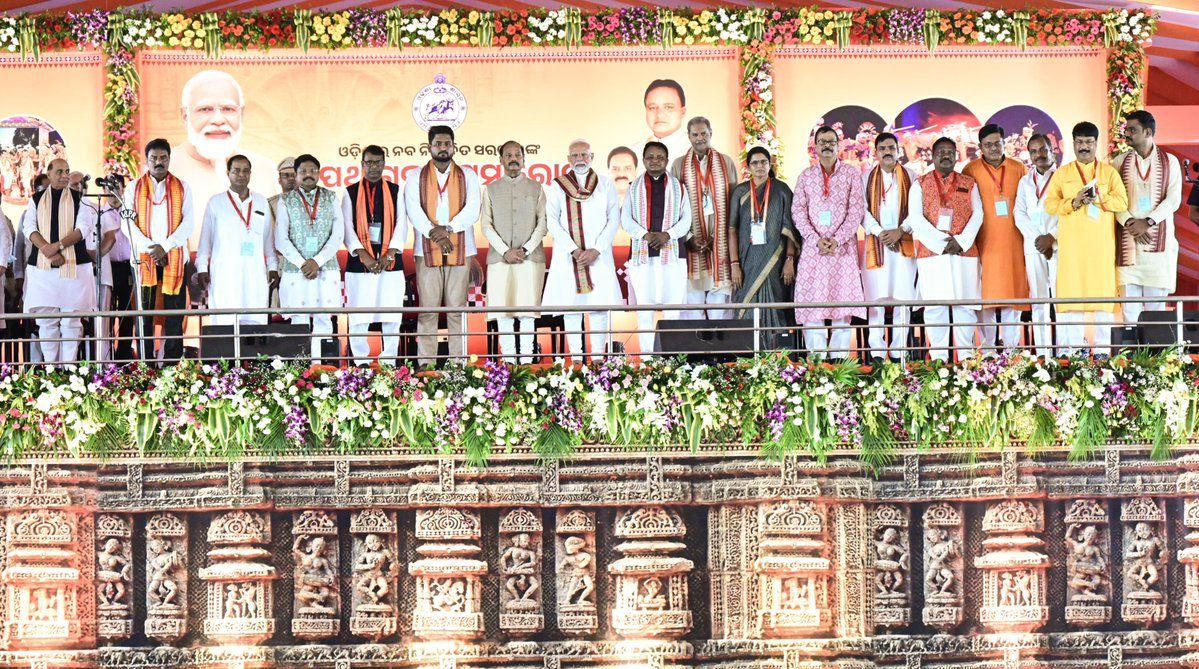
- Mohan Majhi Cabinet along with PM Narendra Modi
- Date formed: 12 June 2024

People and organisations
- Governor: Dr. Hari Babu Kambhampati
- Chief Minister: Mohan Charan Majhi
- Deputy Chief Minister: Kanak Vardhan Singh Deo; Pravati Parida
- No. of ministers: 16
- Member parties: Bharatiya Janata Party
- Status in legislature: Majority
- Opposition party: Biju Janata Dal
- Opposition leader: Naveen Patnaik

History
- Election: 2024 Assembly election
- Legislature terms: 2 years, 154 days
- Predecessor: Fifth Naveen Patnaik ministry

The Mohan Charan Majhi ministry is the incumbent governing council of the state of Odisha, India, formed after the 2024 Odisha Legislative Assembly election. Following the election, Mohan Charan Majhi was elected as the leader of the Bharatiya Janata Party (BJP) legislative group on 11 June 2024. He assumed office as the Chief Minister of Odisha the following day on 12 June 2024, alongside two Deputy Chief Ministers and a 13-member council of ministers.

The government was established after the BJP won a clear majority by securing 78 out of 147 seats in the assembly. The legislative strength of the treasury benches is further augmented to 81 seats with the external support of 3 independent MLAs. This led to the formation of the 17th Odisha Assembly, ending the 24-year governance of the Biju Janata Dal led by Naveen Patnaik.

== Brief history ==
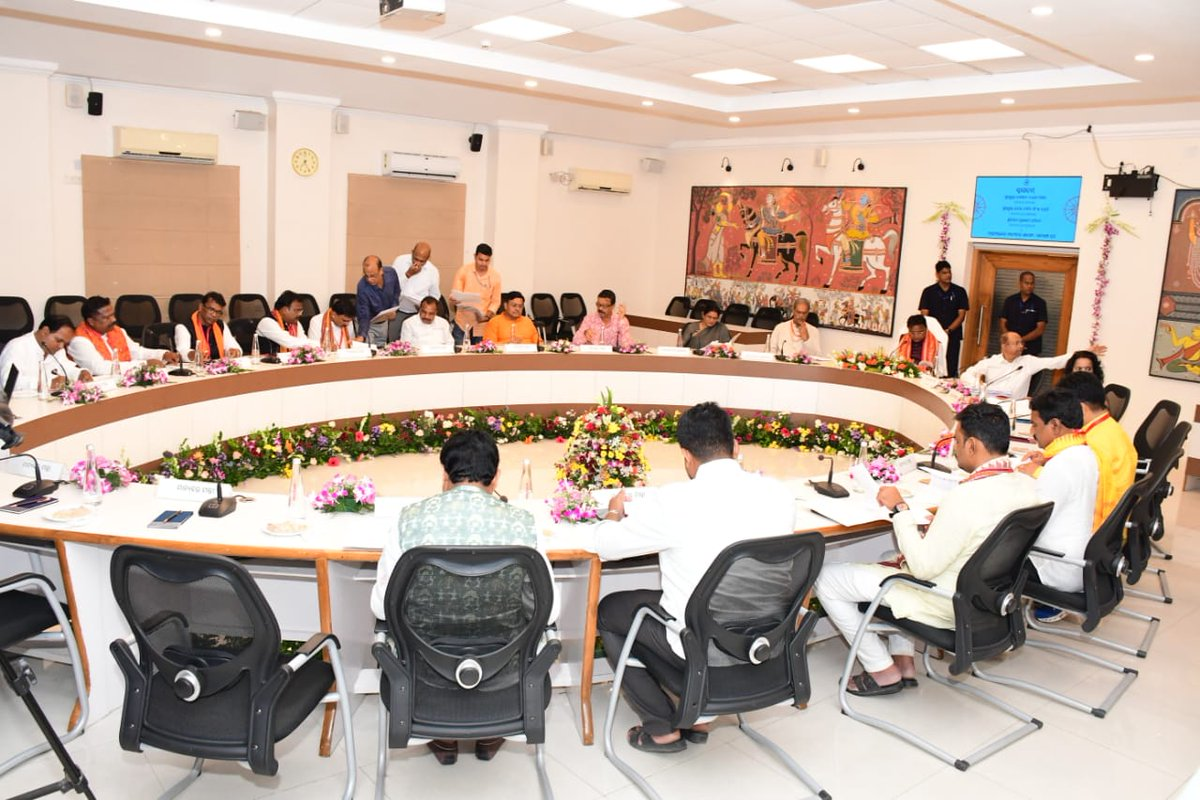
1st Cabinet Meeting of Mohan Charan Majhi ministry in 2024

On 12 June 2024, Chief Minister Mohan Charan Majhi along with his two deputy CMs, 8 Cabinet Ministers, and 5 Minister of State with Independent Charges took oath in Janata Maidan, Bhubaneswar. Governor Raghubar Das administered their oath. Prime Minister Narendra Modi, Home Minister Amit Shah, Defense Minister Rajnath Singh, along with Chief Ministers of 10 BJP ruled states were present.

== Council of Ministers ==
Council of Ministers of the Majhi Ministry
Portrait	Minister Constituency	Portfolio	Took office	Left office	Party
Chief Minister
Mohan Charan Majhi	Mohan Charan Majhi; Kendujhar	Home; General Administration and Public Grievance; Finance; Information and Public Relations; Water Resources; Planning and Convergence; Other departments not allocated to any minister	12 June 2024	Incumbent	BJP
Deputy Chief Ministers
Kanak Vardhan Singh Deo	Kanak Vardhan Singh Deo; Patnagad	Agriculture and Farmers' Empowerment; Energy	12 June 2024	Incumbent	BJP
Pravati Parida	Pravati Parida; Nimapada	Women and Child Development; Mission Shakti; Tourism	12 June 2024	Incumbent	BJP
Cabinet Ministers
Suresh Pujari	Suresh Pujari; Brajarajnagar	Revenue and Disaster Management	12 June 2024	Incumbent	BJP
Rabi Narayan Naik	Rabi Narayan Naik; Kuchinda	Rural Development; Panchayati Raj and Drinking Water	12 June 2024	Incumbent	BJP
Nityananda Gond	Nityananda Gond; Umarkot	School and Mass Education; Scheduled Tribes and Scheduled Castes Development, Minorities and Backward Classes Welfare; Social Security and Empowerment of Persons with Disabilities	12 June 2024	Incumbent	BJP
Krushna Chandra Patra	Krushna Chandra Patra; Dhenkanal	Food Supplies and Consumer Welfare; Science and Technology	12 June 2024	Incumbent	BJP
Prithviraj Harichandan	Prithviraj Harichandan; Chilika	Law; Works; Excise	12 June 2024	Incumbent	BJP
Mukesh Mahaling	Mukesh Mahaling; Loisingha	Health and Family Welfare; Parliamentary Affairs; Electronics and Information Technology	12 June 2024	Incumbent	BJP
Bibhuti Bhusan Jena	Bibhuti Bhusan Jena; Gopalpur	Commerce and Transport; Steel and Mines	12 June 2024	Incumbent	BJP
Krushna Chandra Mahapatra	Krushna Chandra Mohapatra; Morada	Housing and Urban Development; Public Enterprises	12 June 2024	Incumbent	BJP
Ministers of State (Independent Charge)
Ganesh Ram Singh Khuntia	Ganesh Ram Singh Khuntia; Jashipur	Forest, Environment and Climate Change; Labour and Employees' State Insurance	12 June 2024	Incumbent	BJP
Suryabanshi Suraj	Suryabanshi Suraj; Dhamnagar	Higher Education; Sports and Youth Services; Odia Language, Literature and Culture	12 June 2024	Incumbent	BJP
Pradeep Bal Samanta	Pradeep Bal Samanta; Sukinda	Co-operation; Handlooms, Textiles and Handicrafts	12 June 2024	Incumbent	BJP
Gokula Nanda Mallik	Gokula Nanda Mallik; Polasara	Fisheries and Animal Resources Development; Micro, Small and Medium Enterprises	12 June 2024	Incumbent	BJP
Sampad Chandra Swain	Sampad Chandra Swain; Paradeep	Industries; Skill Development and Technical Education	12 June 2024	Incumbent	BJP

== Demographics ==
Division	District	Ministers	Cabinet Ministers	Ministers of State
Northern	Anugola	0	–	–
Northern	Balangir	2	Kanak Vardhan Singh Deo (Deputy CM); Mukesh Mahaling	–
Northern	Bargarh	0	–	–
Northern	Boudh	0	–	–
Northern	Dhenkanal	1	Krushna Chandra Patra	–
Northern	Debagada	0	–	–
Northern	Jharsuguda	1	Suresh Pujari	–
Northern	Kendujhar	1	Mohan Charan Majhi (Chief Minister)	–
Northern	Nuapada	0	–	–
Northern	Sonpur	0	–	–
Northern	Sambalpur	1	Rabi Narayan Naik	–
Northern	Sundaragada	0	–	–
Central	Baleshwar	0	–	–
Central	Bhadrak	1	–	Suryabanshi Suraj
Central	Kataka	0	–	–
Central	Jagatsinghpur	1	–	Sampad Chandra Swain
Central	Jajpur	1	–	Pradeep Bal Samanta
Central	Khordha	1	Prithviraj Harichandan	–
Central	Kendrapada	0	–	–
Central	Mayurbhanj	2	Krushna Chandra Mohapatra	Ganesh Ram Singh Khuntia
Central	Nayagada	0	–	–
Central	Puri	1	Pravati Parida (Deputy CM)	–
Southern	Gajapati	0	–	–
Southern	Ganjam	2	Bibhuti Bhusan Jena	Gokula Nanda Mallik
Southern	Kalahandi	0	–	–
Southern	Kandhamala	0	–	–
Southern	Koraput	0	–	–
Southern	Malkangiri	0	–	–
Southern	Nabarangpur	1	Nityananda Gond	–
Southern	Rayagada	0	–	–
