= Chadheibhol =

Village in Odisha, India

Chadheibhol Chadhaibhol
- Village
- Location in Odisha, India Chadheibhol (India)
- Coordinates: 21°49′26″N 85°49′39″E
- Country: India
- State: Odisha
- District: Mayurbhanj district

Area
  - Total: 2.18 km^{2} (0.84 sq mi)
- Elevation: 478 m (1,568 ft)

Population (2011)
  - Total: 1,538
  - Density: 706/km^{2} (1,830/sq mi)

Languages
  - Official: Odia
  - Major local languages: Mundari, Santali, Bengali, Urdu
- Time zone: UTC+5:30 (IST)
- PIN: 757037
- Telephone code: 02739-xxxxxx
- Vehicle registration: OD11-X-XXXX
- Nearest city: Karanjia, Keonjhar
- Lok Sabha constituency: Keonjhar
- Vidhan Sabha constituency: Karanjia

Chadheibhol (also spelled Chadhaibhol) is a village in the Mayurbhanj district of Odisha, India. The village lies on NH 49 (now part of Asian Highway 46), between Jashipur and Keonjhar. It is about 130 km west of the district headquarters, Baripada, and about 229 km from the state capital, Bhubaneswar.

Chadhaibhol falls under Chitraposi Gram Panchayat within Karanjia block. The Karanjia block map (from GIS Odisha) shows Chadhaibhol listed under that GP.

== Demographics ==
As per the 2011 Census, Chadheibhol had a population of 1,538 people (815 males and 723 females), across about 318 households. Children aged 0–6 years numbered 230 (123 boys and 107 girls). The sex ratio was 887 females per 1,000 males. Literacy stood at 73.62% (male literacy 79.77%, female literacy 66.72%).

Out of the total population, 475 people were engaged in work (400 males, 75 females). Among these, 353 were classified as "main workers" and 122 as "marginal workers." In terms of caste composition, 10 individuals belonged to Scheduled Castes and 98 to Scheduled Tribes.

== Education ==
Chadhaibhol has several educational institutions, including:

- New Govt. Panchayat HS, Chadheibhol (high school), established in 1977, a government coeducational school serving classes 8 to 10
- Chadhaibhol PS (Primary School), established in 1959, a government coeducational school serving classes 1 to 5
- Madrasa Darul Uloom Husainia, Madani Nagar, Chadheibhol (Islamic seminary)

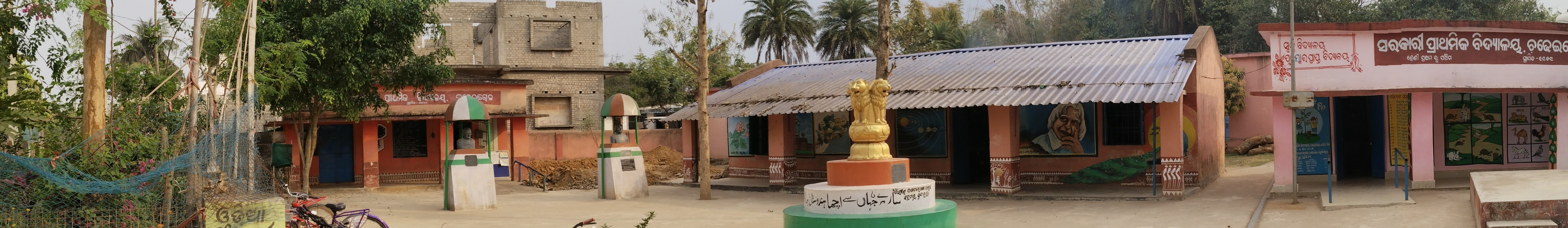
Chadheibhol U.P School

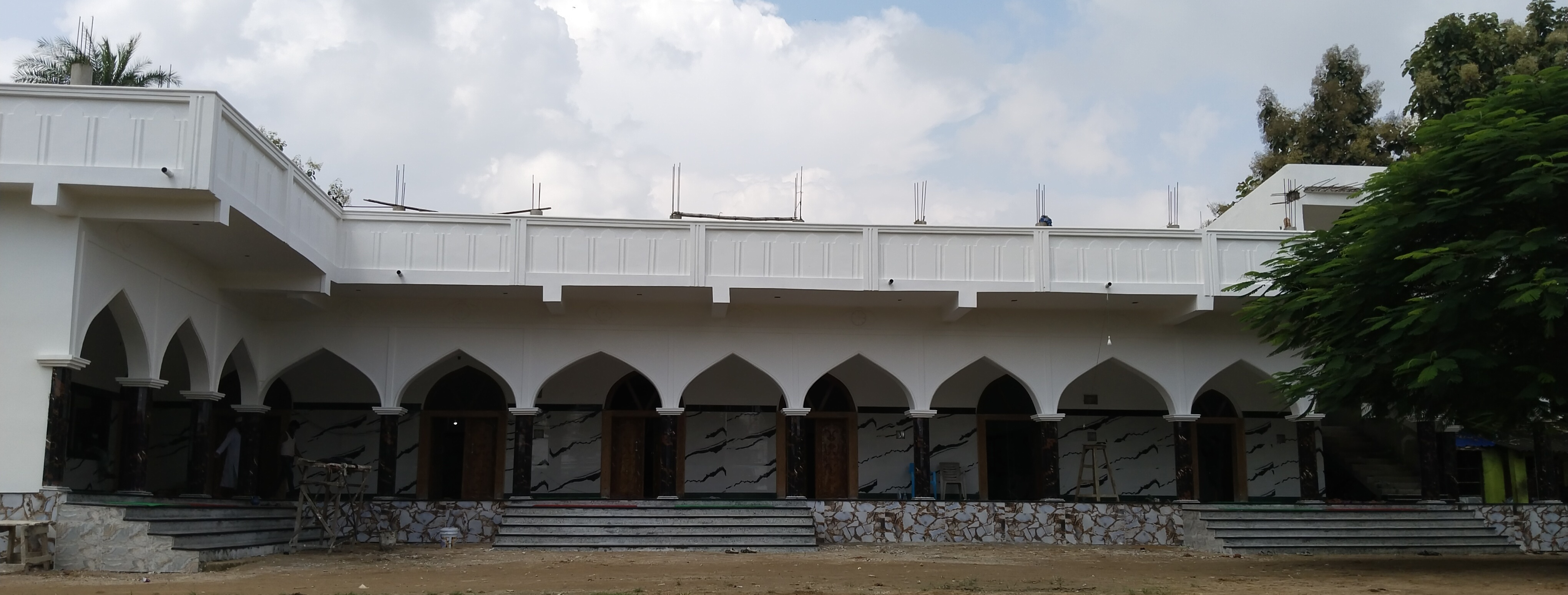
Darul Uloom Husainia, Madani Nagar

== Connectivity ==
Chadhaibhol is well connected by road, situated on NH 49 / AH 46 between Jashipur and Keonjhar. Public and private bus services are available in or near the village.

The nearest major town for services is Karanjia, located approximately 16–22 km away.

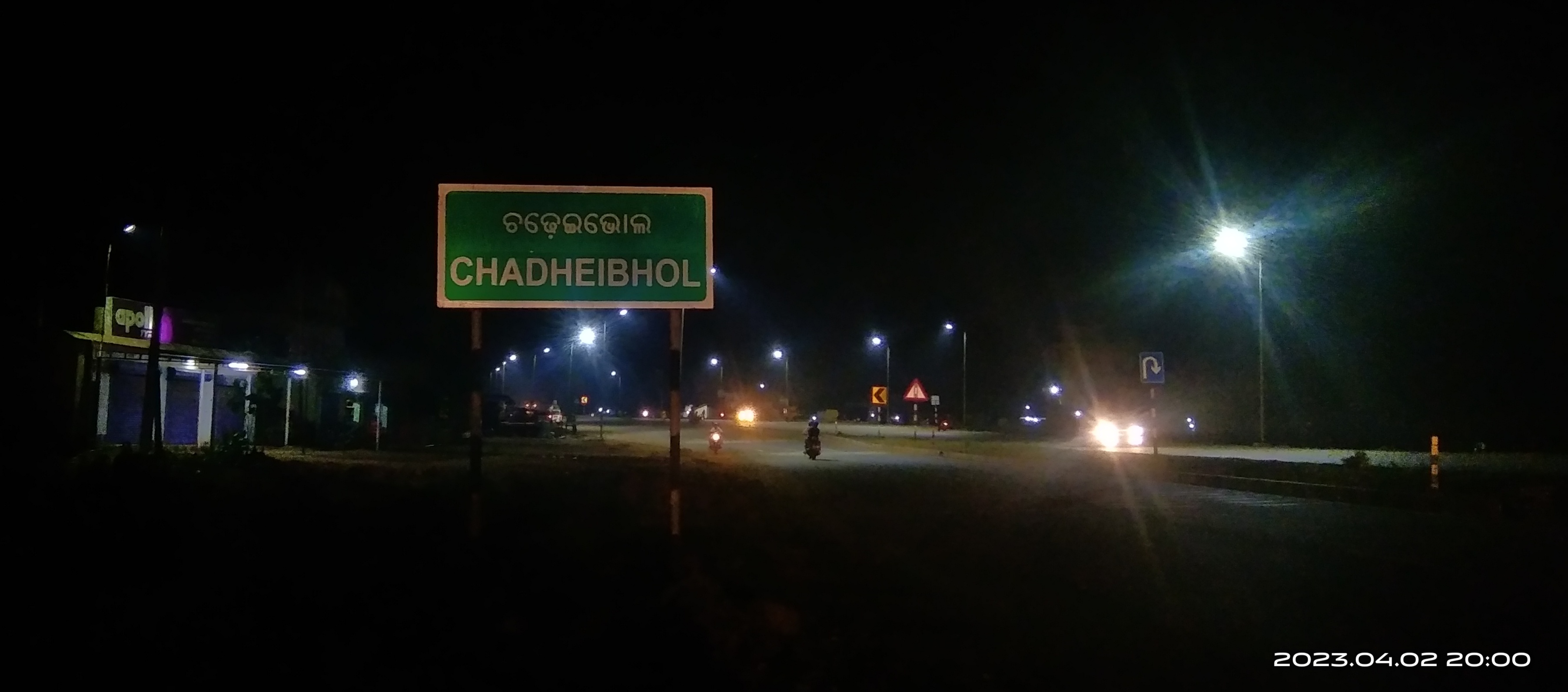
Signboard of National Highway 49 at Chadheibhol, Mayurbhanj district
