= Padma Charan Haiburu =

Indian politician

Member of Odisha Legislative Assembly
- Incumbent
- Assumed office 4 June 2024
- Preceded by: Basanti Hembram
- Constituency: Karanjia

Personal details
- Party: Bharatiya Janata Party
- Profession: Politician

Padma Charan Haiburu is an Indian politician. He was elected to the Odisha Legislative Assembly from Karanjia as a member of the Bharatiya Janata Party.
