= Nilamadhab Hikaka =

Indian politician

Member of the Odisha Legislative Assembly
- Incumbent
- Assumed office 4 June 2024
- Preceded by: Jagannath Saraka
- Constituency: Bissam Cuttack

Personal details
- Party: Indian National Congress
- Profession: Politician

Nilamadhab Hikaka is an Indian politician who was elected to the Odisha Legislative Assembly from 2024, representing Bissam Cuttack as a member of the Indian National Congress.
