= Korei Assembly constituency =

Constituency of the Odisha legislative assembly in India

Coordinates: 20.96°N 86.18°E

Korei
- Constituency No. 53 for the Odisha Legislative Assembly

Constituency details
- Country: India
- Region: East India
- State: Odisha
- Division: Central Division
- District: Jajpur
- Lok Sabha constituency: Jajpur
- Established: 1974
- Total electors: 2,09,605 (Note: as on 2024) (Note: as data published by election commission)
- Reservation: None

Member of Legislative Assembly
- 17th Odisha Legislative Assembly
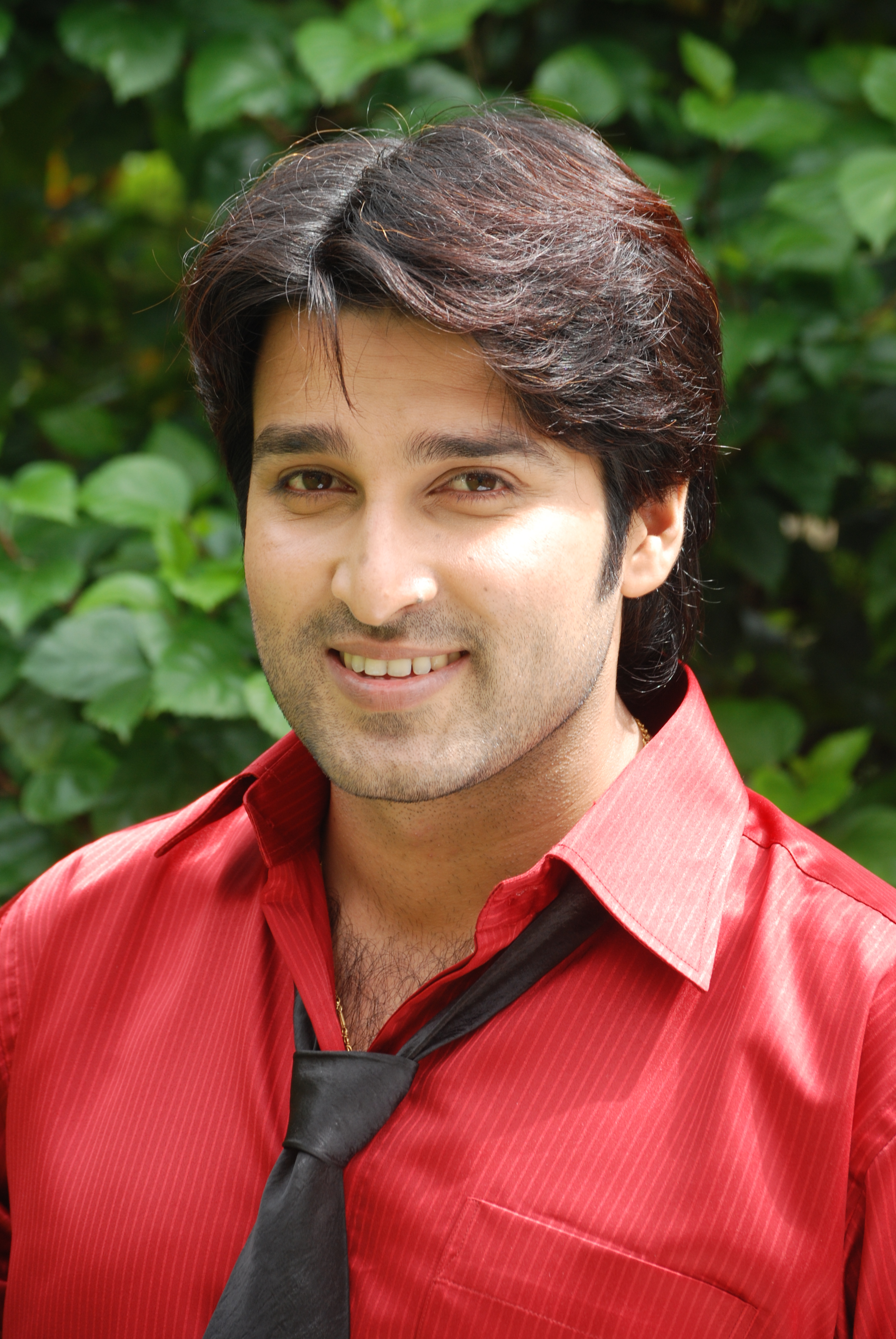
- Incumbent Akash Dasnayak
- Party: Bharatiya Janata Party
- Elected year: 2024

Korei is a Vidhan Sabha constituency of Jajpur district, Odisha, India.

The area of this state legislature constituency includes Byasanagar, Korei block and 9 GPs (Bhotaka, Laxminagar, Pahanga, Badakainchi, Gandhan, Tikarpada, Bahadalpur, Narasinghpur and Mugupal) of Rasulpur block.

== Members of the Legislative Assembly ==
Vote share of winning candidates
2024	48.01%
2019	49.6%
2014	55.75%
2009	56.98%
2004	55.18%
2000	38.21%
1995	49.58%
1990	63.37%
1985	47.77%
1980	54.38%
1977	60.55%

Since its formation in 1974, 12 elections have been held here till 2024.

The members elected from Korei constituency are:

Election	Name	Party
2024	Akash Dasnayak	Bharatiya Janata Party
2019	Ashok Kumar Bal	Biju Janata Dal
2014	Akash Dasnayak	Biju Janata Dal
2009	Pritiranjan Gharai	Biju Janata Dal
2004	Sanchita Mohanty	Bharatiya Janata Party
2000	Ashok Kumar Das	Janata Dal
1995	Ashok Kumar Das	Janata Dal
1990	Ashok Kumar Das	Janata Dal
1985	Rama Chandra Khuntia	Indian National Congress
1980	Ashok Kumar Das	Janata Party (Secular)
1977	Ashok Kumar Das	Janata Party
1974	Ashok Kumar Das	Utkal Congress

== Election results ==
=== 2024 ===
Voting were held on 1st June 2024 in 4th phase of Odisha Assembly Election & 7th phase of Indian General Election. Counting of votes was on 4th June 2024. In 2024 election, Bharatiya Janata Party candidate Akash Dasnayak defeated Biju Janata Dal candidate Sandhyarani Das by a margin of 5,646 votes.

2024 Odisha Legislative Assembly election: Korei
Party	Candidate	Votes	%	±%
BJP	Akash Dasnayak	79,658	48.01	▲19.17
BJD	Sandhyarani Das	74,012	44.61	▼4.99
INC	Bandita Parida	8,177	4.93	▼14.32
NOTA	None of the above	746	0.45	▼0.04
Majority		5,646	3.4	▼17.36
Turnout		1,65,925	79.16	
BJP gain from BJD				

=== 2019 ===
Elections to Korei constituency was held along with 2019 General elections on 29 April 2019. The vote counting was held on 23 May 2019. In 2019 election, Biju Janata Dal candidate Ashok Kumar Bal defeated Bharatiya Janata Party Candidate Biswajeet Nayak by margin of 30724 votes.

2019 Vidhan Sabha Election, Korei
Party	Candidate	Votes	%	±%
BJD	Ashok Kumar Bal	73,403	49.6	▼6.15
BJP	Biswajeet Nayak	42679	28.84	▲17
INC	Bandita Parida	28486	19.25	▼4.19
NOTA	None of the above	731	0.49	▼0.3
Majority		30724	20.76	▼11.55
Turnout		147989	75.51	▼0.16
Registered electors		194,105		
BJD hold				

=== 2014 ===
In 2014 election, Biju Janata Dal candidate Akash Dasnayak defeated Indian National Congress candidate Biswajeet Nayak by a margin of 42,867 votes.

2014 Vidhan Sabha Election, Korei
Party	Candidate	Votes	%	±%
BJD	Akash Dasnayak	73,966	55.75	▼1.23
INC	Biswajeet Nayak	31,099	23.44	▼10.25
BJP	Sanchita Mohanty	15,761	11.88	▲6.22
NOTA	None of the above	911	0.69	−
Majority		42,867	32.31	9.03
Turnout		1,32,681	76.28	9.32
Registered electors		1,73,934		
BJD hold				

=== 2009 ===
In 2009 election, Biju Janata Dal candidate Pritiranjan Gharai defeated Indian National Congress candidate Hemalata Khuntia by a margin of 25,112 votes.

2009 Vidhan Sabha Election, Korei
Party	Candidate	Votes	%	±%
BJD	Pritiranjan Gharai	61,448	56.98	−
INC	Hemalata Khuntia	36,336	33.69	−
BJP	Sanchita Mohanty	6,101	5.66	−
Majority		25,112	23.28 (Note: % of total valid votes)	−
Turnout		1,07,871	66.96	−
BJD gain from BJP				
