= Ramakrushna Gouda =

Indian politician

Member: Odisha Legislative Assembly
- In office 1990–1995
- Preceded by: Umakanta Mishra
- Succeeded by: Bikram Keshari Arukha
- Constituency: Bhanjanagar

Personal details
- Born: 28 November 1932 (age 93) Bhanjanagar, Ganjam, Odisha, India
- Died: 1 May 2010 (aged 77)
- Party: Janata Dal
- Spouse: Anusaya Gouda
- Children: 7 (1 son, 6 daughter)
- Parent: Binayak Gouda (father)
- Profession: Politician, Social Worker

Ramakrushna Gouda was a politician in Odisha. He served as the Member of Legislative Assembly for Bhanjanagar from the year 1990–1995.
