= List of deputy chief ministers of Odisha =

Dy. Head of the Government of Odisha

Deputy Chief Minister of Odisha
- ଓଡ଼ିଶାର ଉପ ମୁଖ୍ୟମନ୍ତ୍ରୀ
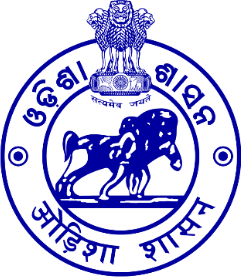
- Emblem of Odisha

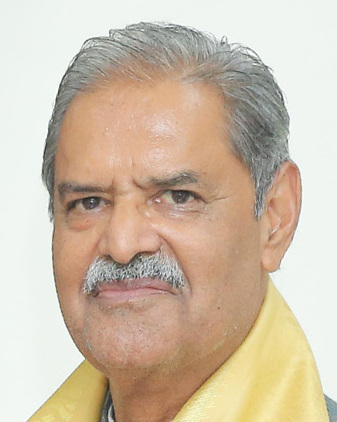
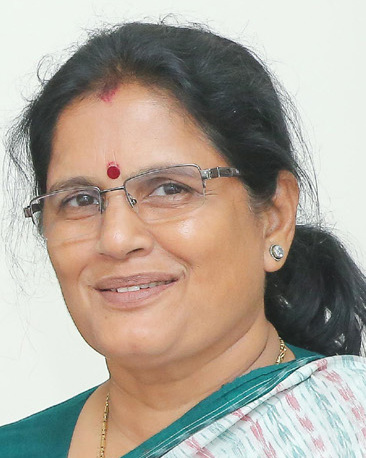
- Shri Kanak Vardhan Singh Deo Smt. Pravati Parida Incumbent; Kanak Vardhan Singh Deo; Pravati Parida since 12 June 2024
- Chief Minister's Office
- Style: Honourable Deputy Chief Minister ମାନ୍ୟବର ଉପ ମୁଖ୍ୟମନ୍ତ୍ରୀ ମହୋଦୟ / ମହୋଦୟା
- Status: Deputy Head of Government
- Abbreviation: DCM
- Member of: Odisha Legislative Assembly; Council of Ministers
- Reports to: Governor of Odisha; Lok Seva Bhavan; Chief Minister of Odisha
- Residence: Bhubaneswar, Odisha
- Seat: Lok Seva Bhavan, Bhubaneswar, Odisha
- Appointer: Governor of Odisha; by convention, based on appointee's ability to command confidence in the Odisha Legislative Assembly
- Term length: At the pleasure of the governor; Legislative Assembly term is 5 years unless dissolved sooner No term limits specified.
- Inaugural holder: Pabitra Mohan Pradhan
- Formation: 8 March 1967 (59 years ago)
- Salary: ₹368,000 (US$3,800)/monthly; ₹4,416,000 (US$46,000)/annually
- Website: cm.odisha.gov.in/cabinet

The deputy chief minister of Odisha is a member of the Cabinet of Odisha Government in the Government of Odisha. Not a constitutional office, it seldom carries any specific powers. A deputy chief minister usually also holds a cabinet portfolio such as home minister or finance minister. In the parliamentary system of government, the chief minister is treated as the "first among equals" in the cabinet; the position of deputy chief minister is used to bring political stability and strength within a coalition government.

== List of deputy chief ministers ==
Parties

Orissa Jana Congress
Utkal Congress
Indian National Congress
Bharatiya Janata Party

| No. | Portrait | Name (Birth–Death) Constituency | Term of office Electoral mandates Time in office | | Other ministerial offices held while Deputy Chief Minister | Political party | Government | | Chief Minister | Refs |
|---|---|---|---|---|---|---|---|---|---|---|
| 1 | | Pabitra Mohan Pradhan (1908–1988); Pallahara | 8 March 1967 | 9 January 1971 | Political and Services; Education; Mining and Geology | Orissa Jana Congress | Singh Deo | 4th | Rajendra Narayan Singh Deo | |
| 1 | | Pabitra Mohan Pradhan (1908–1988); Pallahara | 1967 | | Political and Services; Education; Mining and Geology | Orissa Jana Congress | Singh Deo | 4th | Rajendra Narayan Singh Deo | |
| 1 | | Pabitra Mohan Pradhan (1908–1988); Pallahara | 3 years, 10 months and 1 day | | Political and Services; Education; Mining and Geology | Orissa Jana Congress | Singh Deo | 4th | Rajendra Narayan Singh Deo | |
| 1 | | Pabitra Mohan Pradhan (1908–1988); Pallahara | Pradhan co-founded the Orissa Jana Congress after leaving the Indian National Congress in 1966. Following the 1967 election, he became Odisha's first Deputy Chief Minister in a coalition government with the Swatantra Party. He resigned in January 1971 when the Jana Congress withdrew from the coalition, bringing down the ministry. | | | | | | Rajendra Narayan Singh Deo | |
Office vacant (9 January 1971 – 14 June 1972)
| 2 | | Nilamani Routray (1920–2004); Basudevpur | 14 June 1972 | 1 March 1973 | Industries; Supply; Law | Utkal Congress | Satpathy I | 5th | Nandini Satpathy | |
| 2 | | Nilamani Routray (1920–2004); Basudevpur | 1971 | | Industries; Supply; Law | Utkal Congress | Satpathy I | 5th | Nandini Satpathy | |
| 2 | | Nilamani Routray (1920–2004); Basudevpur | 8 months and 15 days | | Industries; Supply; Law | Utkal Congress | Satpathy I | 5th | Nandini Satpathy | |
| 2 | | Nilamani Routray (1920–2004); Basudevpur | Routray previously served in the United Front cabinet under Bishwanath Das before defecting with Utkal Congress legislators to support a Congress (R) government in June 1972. Appointed Deputy Chief Minister under Nandini Satpathy, he resigned on 1 March 1973 due to policy disagreements, which led to the collapse of the ministry two days later. | | | | | | Nandini Satpathy | |
Office vacant (1 March 1973 – 15 March 1995)
| 3 | | Hemananda Biswal (1939–2022); Laikera | 15 March 1995 | 9 May 1998 | Panchayati Raj; Housing; Public Grievances and Pension Administration | Indian National Congress | Janaki III | 11th | Janaki Ballabh Patnaik | |
| 3 | | Hemananda Biswal (1939–2022); Laikera | 1995 | | Panchayati Raj; Housing; Public Grievances and Pension Administration | Indian National Congress | Janaki III | 11th | Janaki Ballabh Patnaik | |
| 3 | | Hemananda Biswal (1939–2022); Laikera | 3 years, 1 month and 24 days | | Panchayati Raj; Housing; Public Grievances and Pension Administration | Indian National Congress | Janaki III | 11th | Janaki Ballabh Patnaik | |
| 3 | | Hemananda Biswal (1939–2022); Laikera | A former Chief Minister (1989–1990), Biswal was appointed alongside Basant Kumar Biswal when the Congress returned to office in 1995, marking the first time two Deputy Chief Ministers served simultaneously in Odisha. He resigned from the cabinet in May 1998 after being appointed president of the Odisha Pradesh Congress Committee. | | | | | | Janaki Ballabh Patnaik | |
| 4 | | Basant Kumar Biswal (1936–2003); Tirtol | 15 March 1995 | 17 February 1999 | Finance; Water Resources; Parliamentary Affairs | Indian National Congress | Janaki III | 11th | Janaki Ballabh Patnaik | |
| 4 | | Basant Kumar Biswal (1936–2003); Tirtol | 1995 | | Finance; Water Resources; Parliamentary Affairs | Indian National Congress | Janaki III | 11th | Janaki Ballabh Patnaik | |
| 4 | | Basant Kumar Biswal (1936–2003); Tirtol | 3 years, 11 months and 2 days | | Finance; Water Resources; Parliamentary Affairs | Indian National Congress | Janaki III | 11th | Janaki Ballabh Patnaik | |
| 4 | | Basant Kumar Biswal (1936–2003); Tirtol | Appointed alongside Hemananda Biswal in March 1995, he held key economic portfolios including Finance and Water Resources throughout the third J. B. Patnaik administration. His tenure ended when Patnaik resigned as Chief Minister in February 1999. | | | | | | Janaki Ballabh Patnaik | |
Office vacant (17 February 1999 – 12 June 2024)
| 5 | | Kanak Vardhan Singh Deo (born 1956); Patnagarh | 12 June 2024 | Incumbent | Agriculture and Farmers' Empowerment; Energy | Bharatiya Janata Party | Majhi | 17th | Mohan Charan Majhi | |
| 5 | | Kanak Vardhan Singh Deo (born 1956); Patnagarh | 2024 | | Agriculture and Farmers' Empowerment; Energy | Bharatiya Janata Party | Majhi | 17th | Mohan Charan Majhi | |
| 5 | | Kanak Vardhan Singh Deo (born 1956); Patnagarh | 2 years, 4 months and 13 days | | Agriculture and Farmers' Empowerment; Energy | Bharatiya Janata Party | Majhi | 17th | Mohan Charan Majhi | |
| 5 | | Kanak Vardhan Singh Deo (born 1956); Patnagarh | A six-term MLA from Patnagarh, former state BJP president, and grandson of former Chief Minister Rajendra Narayan Singh Deo. He previously served as a cabinet minister in the BJD–BJP coalition governments from 2000 to 2009 before taking office as Deputy Chief Minister in the first BJP government in Odisha. | | | | | | Mohan Charan Majhi | |
| 6 | | Pravati Parida (born 1966); Nimapara | 12 June 2024 | Incumbent | Women and Child Development; Mission Shakti; Tourism | Bharatiya Janata Party | Majhi | 17th | Mohan Charan Majhi | |
| 6 | | Pravati Parida (born 1966); Nimapara | 2024 | | Women and Child Development; Mission Shakti; Tourism | Bharatiya Janata Party | Majhi | 17th | Mohan Charan Majhi | |
| 6 | | Pravati Parida (born 1966); Nimapara | 2 years, 4 months and 13 days | | Women and Child Development; Mission Shakti; Tourism | Bharatiya Janata Party | Majhi | 17th | Mohan Charan Majhi | |
| 6 | | Pravati Parida (born 1966); Nimapara | An advocate and former president of the state BJP Mahila Morcha, Parida was elected to the assembly for the first time from Nimapara in 2024. Appointed alongside Kanak Vardhan Singh Deo, she is the first woman to serve as Deputy Chief Minister of Odisha. | | | | | | Mohan Charan Majhi | |

== Statistics ==
=== Share of time in office by political party ===
Share of total Deputy Chief Minister tenure by political party in Odisha (as of 19 October 2026)
1. Indian National Congress (43.3%)
2. Orissa Jana Congress (23.5%)
3. Bharatiya Janata Party (28.8%)
4. Utkal Congress (4.36%)

(Note: Percentages are calculated from the combined duration of individual Deputy Chief Minister tenures through 19 October 2026. Concurrent tenures are counted separately for each officeholder. The total is 5,967 person-days. Percentages are rounded to two decimal places.)

=== List of deputy chief ministers by length of tenure ===
Deputy Chief Ministers of Odisha by length of tenure
| Rank | Deputy Chief Minister | Political party | Length of tenure | |
| Rank | Deputy Chief Minister | Political party | Longest continuous term | Total time in office |
|---|---|---|---|---|
| 1 | Basant Kumar Biswal | Indian National Congress | 3 years, 339 days | 3 years, 339 days |
| 2 | Pabitra Mohan Pradhan | Orissa Jana Congress | 3 years, 307 days | 3 years, 307 days |
| 3 | Hemananda Biswal | Indian National Congress | 3 years, 55 days | 3 years, 55 days |
| 4 | Kanak Vardhan Singh Deo (Incumbent) | Bharatiya Janata Party | 2 years, 129 days | 2 years, 129 days |
| 5 | Pravati Parida (Incumbent) | Bharatiya Janata Party | 2 years, 129 days | 2 years, 129 days |
| 6 | Nilamani Routray | Utkal Congress | 260 days | 260 days |

(Note: Rankings are based on elapsed days between the start and end dates of each tenure. Kanak Vardhan Singh Deo and Pravati Parida's durations are calculated through 19 October 2026. Basant Kumar Biswal and Hemananda Biswal held office concurrently from 15 March 1995 to 9 May 1998.)

== See also ==
- Government of Odisha
- Governor of Odisha
- Chief Minister of Odisha
- Speaker of the Odisha Legislative Assembly
- Leader of the Opposition in the Odisha Legislative Assembly
- Odisha Legislative Assembly
- Elections in Odisha
- Politics of Odisha
- List of current Indian deputy chief ministers
