= Tukuni Sahu =

Indian politician

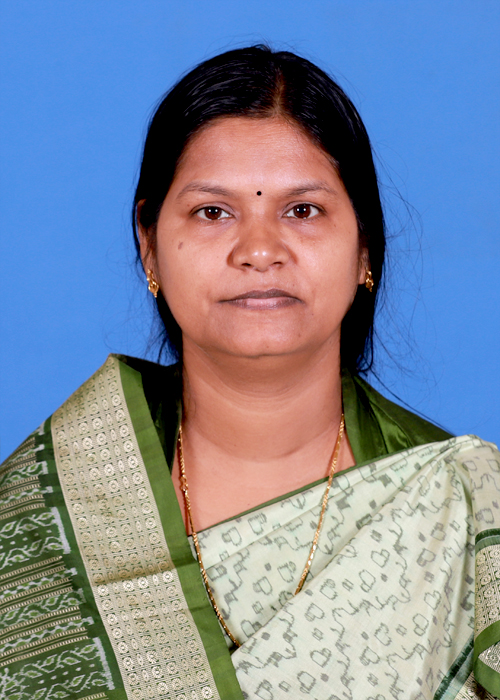

Cabinet Minister Government of Odisha
- In office 29 May 2019 – 11 June 2024
- Chief Minister: Naveen Patnaik
- Ministry and Departments: Commerce and Transport; Water Resources; Women & Child Development; Mission Shakti

Member of Odisha Legislative Assembly
- In office 2014–2024
- Preceded by: Surendra Singh Bhoi
- Succeeded by: Nabin Kumar Jain
- Constituency: Titlagarh

Personal details
- Born: 13 March 1976 (age 50) Balangir, Odisha, India
- Party: Biju Janta Dal
- Spouse: Abhimanyu Sahu
- Education: Graduate
- Alma mater: Utkal University

Tukuni Sahu is an Indian politician from Odisha who was a two time elected Member of the Odisha Legislative Assembly from 2014 and 2019, representing Titlagarh Assembly constituency as a Member of the Biju Janata Dal.

== See also ==
- 2014 Odisha Legislative Assembly election
- Odisha Legislative Assembly
