= Pradeep Bal Samanta =

Indian politician

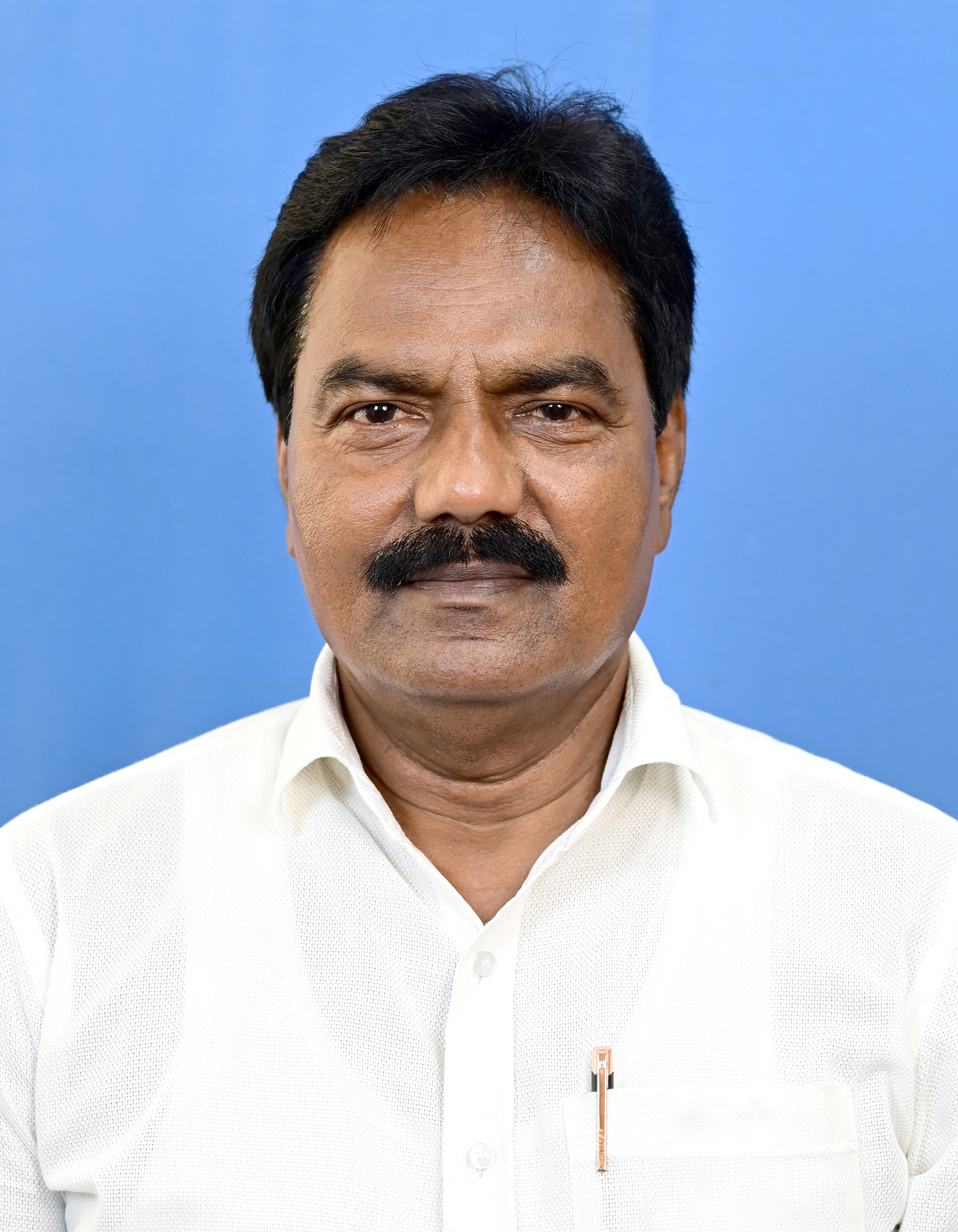
- Samanta in 2024

Minister of State (Independent Charge) for Cooperation, Handloom and Textiles, Government of Odisha
- In office 12 June 2024 – Incumbent
- Chief Minister: Mohan Charan Majhi

Member of Odisha Legislative Assembly
- In office 4 June 2024 – Incumbent
- Preceded by: Pritiranjan Gharai
- Constituency: Sukinda

Personal details
- Party: Bharatiya Janata Party
- Parent: Nabaghan Bal Samantha
- Profession: Politician, Business & Social Service

Pradeep Bal Samanta is an Indian politician and Minister of State (Independent Charge) for Cooperation, Handloom and Textiles in Government of Odisha. He is a member of the Member of Odisha Legislative Assembly from Sukinda Assembly constituency of Jajpur district.

He did his PhD from The Open International university, in Colombo, Sri Lanka in 2008.

On 12 June 2024, he took oath along with Chief Minister Mohan Charan Majhitook oath in Janata Maidan, Bhubaneswar. Governor Raghubar Das administered their oath. Prime Minister Narendra Modi, Home Minister Amit Shah, Defense Minister Rajnath Singh, along with Chief Ministers of 10 BJP-ruled states were present.
