= Jayanarayan Mohanty =

Indian politician (1951–2024)

Personal details
- Born: 11 October 1951 Balasore district, Orissa, India
- Died: 20 January 2024 (aged 72) Bhubaneswar, Odisha, India
- Party: Indian National Congress

Member of the Odisha Assembly for Jaleswar
- In office 15 March 1995 – 6 February 2004
- Preceded by: Aswini Kumar Patra (BJD)
- Succeeded by: Aswini Kumar Patra (BJD)

Jayanarayan Mohanty (Odia: ଜୟନାରାୟଣ ମହାନ୍ତି; 11 October 1951 – 20 January 2024) was an Indian politician who was active in Odisha politics. Representing the Indian National Congress, he served two terms as an MLA in Odisha Legislative Assembly. In the 1995 and 2000 Odisha Legislative Assembly elections, respectively, he was elected to the 11th and 12th Odisha Legislative Assembly from Jaleswar constituency.

== Early and personal life ==
Jayanarayan Mohanty was born on 11 October 1951 in Balasore district, the son of Sambhunath Mohanty. He had a bachelor's degree in commerce. He was married to Shuklata Mohanty with whom he had four children.

== Political career ==
In the 1995 Odisha Legislative Assembly elections, Mohanty contested as a candidate of the Indian National Congress from the Jaleshwar constituency. He won this election and was elected to the 11th Odisha Legislative Assembly. Later, in the 2000 Odisha Legislative Assembly elections, he again contested as a candidate of the Indian National Congress from the Jaleshwar constituency. He won this election and was elected to the 12th Odisha Legislative Assembly.

== Death ==
Mohanty died on 20 January 2024, at the age of 72.
