= Bikram Keshari Arukha =

Indian politician

Cabinet Minister Government of Odisha
- In office 29 May 2019 – 11 June 2024
- Chief Minister: Naveen Patnaik
- Ministry and Departments: Finance; Parliamentary Affairs; Forest & Environment and Climate Change

Member of Odisha Legislative Assembly
- In office 9 March 1995 – 4 Jun 2024
- Preceded by: Ramakrushna Gouda
- Succeeded by: Pradyumna Kumar Nayak
- Constituency: Bhanjanagar

Speaker of Odisha Legislative Assembly
- In office 13 June 2022 – 12 May 2023
- Preceded by: Surjya Narayan Patro
- Succeeded by: Pramila Mallik

Personal details
- Born: 28 September 1962 (age 63) Bhanjanagar, Odisha, India
- Party: Biju Janata Dal

Bikram Keshari Arukha is an Indian politician and Member of Odisha Legislative Assembly from Bhanjanagar Assembly constituency who served as Speaker of Odisha Legislative Assembly till 2023. He is continuously six time MLA from Bhanjanagar Assembly constituency. Bikram Keshari Arukha has publicly stated that if he loses the 2024 election, he will retire from active politics. This declaration has added a significant layer of seriousness and personal stakes to his political campaign."

== Personal life ==
He was born on 28 September 1962 in Ganjam.
