= Pradyumna Kumar Nayak =

Indian politician

Member of Odisha Legislative Assembly Office Address- Kripalu Nagar, Bagdebi Road, Bhanjanagar, Ganjam, 9437308792
- Incumbent
- Assumed office 4 June 2024
- Preceded by: Bikram Keshari Arukha
- Constituency: Bhanjanagar

Personal details
- Born: Tilisingi Current Residence Address-Kripalu Nagar, Bagdebi Road, Bhanjanagar, Ganjam
- Party: Bharatiya Janata Party
- Profession: Politician

Pradyumna Kumar Nayak (born 1967) is an Indian politician from Odisha. He was elected to the Odisha Legislative Assembly from the Bhanjanagar Assembly constituency representing the Bharatiya Janata Party in the 2024 Odisha Legislative Assembly election.

== Early life and education ==
Nayak is from Bhanjanagar, Ganjam district, Odisha. He is the son of Shyama Sundar Nayak. He completed his LLM in 1996 at Capital Law College, Bhubaneshwar which is affiliated with Utkal University. He is a practising advocate.

== Career ==
Nayak became an MLA for the first time winning the Bhanjanagar Assembly constituency representing the Bharatiya Janata Party in the 2024 Odisha Legislative Assembly election. He polled 83,822 votes and defeated his nearest rival, Bikram Keshari Arukha of the Biju Janata Dal, by a margin of 16,324 votes. In the 2019 Odisha Legislative Assembly election, he lost the election on the BJP ticket to Bikram Keshari Arukha of the BJD, by a margin of 9,103 votes.
