= Jaleswar, Odisha Assembly constituency =

Constituency of the Odisha legislative assembly in India

Coordinates: 21.80°N 87.23°E

Jaleswar
- Constituency No. 35 for the Odisha Legislative Assembly

Constituency details
- Country: India
- Region: East India
- State: Odisha
- Division: Central Division
- District: Balasore
- Lok Sabha constituency: Balasore
- Established: 1951
- Total electors: 2,54,539 (Note: as on 2024) (Note: as data published by election commission)
- Reservation: None

Member of Legislative Assembly
- 17th Odisha Legislative Assembly
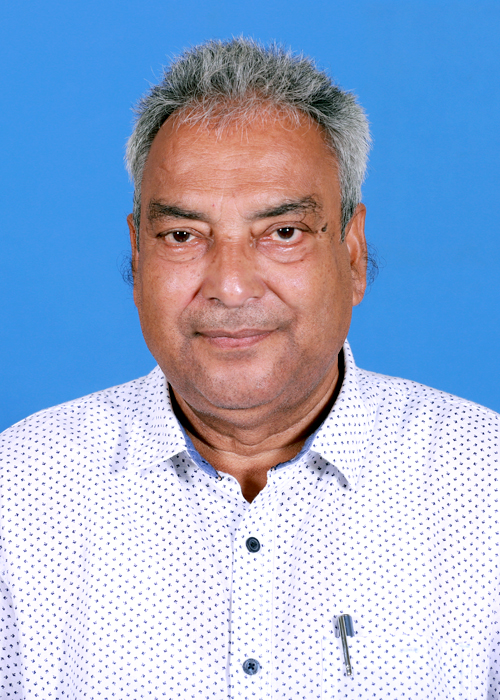
- Incumbent Aswini Kumar Patra
- Party: Biju Janata Dal
- Elected year: 2024

Jaleswar is a Bidhana Sabha constituency of Balasore district, Odisha.

Area of this constituency includes Jaleswar, Jaleswar block and 11 GPs (Natakata, Purusottampur, Kulida, Santoshpur, Raghunathpur, Chormara, Singla, Paunsakulli, Tadada, Putura and Nabara) of Basta block.

== Elected members ==
Vote share of winning candidates
2024	42.37%
2019	48.38%
2014	52.23%
2009	40.95%
2004	51.61%
2000	48.97%
1995	44.44%
1990	59.33%
1985	49.07%
1980	38.02%
1977	62.45%

15 elections held during 1951 to 2014. Elected members from the Jaleswar constituency are:

Year	Member	Party
2024	Aswini Kumar Patra	Biju Janata Dal
2019	Aswini Kumar Patra	Biju Janata Dal
2014	Aswini Kumar Patra	Biju Janata Dal
2009	Debiprasanna Chand	Indian National Congress
2004	Aswini Kumar Patra	Bharatiya Janata Party
2000	Aswini Kumar Patra	Bharatiya Janata Party
1995	Jayanarayan Mohanty	Indian National Congress
1990	Aswini Kumar Patra	Janata Dal
1985	Judhisthir Jena	Indian National Congress
1980	Gadadhar Giri	Janata Party
1977	Gadadhar Giri	Janata Party
1974	Gadadhar Giri	Socialist Party
1971	Prasanna Kumar Paul	Praja Socialist Party
1967	Prasanna Kumar Paul	Praja Socialist Party
1961	Prasanna Kumar Paul	Praja Socialist Party
1957	Prasanna Kumar Paul	Praja Socialist Party
1951	Karunakar Panigrahi	Indian National Congress

== Election results ==
=== 2024 ===
Voting were held on 1 June 2024 in 4th phase of Odisha Assembly Election & 7th phase of Indian General Election. Counting of votes was on 4 June 2024. In 2024 election, Biju Janata Dal candidate Aswini Kumar Patra defeated Bharatiya Janata Party candidate Brajamohan Pradhan by a margin of 319 votes.

2024 Odisha Vidhan Sabha Election, Jaleswar
Party	Candidate	Votes	%	±%
BJD	Aswini Kumar Patra	83,105	42.37	▼6.01
BJP	Brajamohan Pradhan	82,786	42.21	▲13.90
INC	Sudarshan Das	26,692	13.61	▼6.23
Independent	Dibyakam Mohanty	1,568	0.80	
NOTA	None of the above	872	0.44	▼0.08
Majority		319	0.16	
Turnout		1,96,131	77.03	
BJD hold				

=== 2019 ===
In 2019 election, Biju Janata Dal candidate Aswini Kumar Patra defeated Bharatiya Janata Party candidate Jayanarayan Mohanty by a margin of 35,443 votes.

2019 Vidhan Sabha Election, Jaleswar
Party	Candidate	Votes	%	±%
BJD	Aswini Kumar Patra	85,435	48.38	▼3.85
BJP	Jayanarayan Mohanty	49,992	28.31	▲20.14
INC	Sudarsan Das	35,026	19.84	▼11.85
NOTA	None of the above	918	0.52	
Majority		35,443	20.07	
Turnout		176579	74.41	
BJD hold				

=== 2014 ===
In 2014 election, Biju Janata Dal candidate Aswini Kumar Patra defeated Indian National Congress candidate Debiprasanna Chand by a margin of 33,860 votes.

2014 Vidhan Sabha Election, Jaleswar
Party	Candidate	Votes	%	±%
BJD	Aswini Kumar Patra	86,084	52.23	
INC	Debiprasanna Chand	52,224	31.69	▼9.26
BJP	Arun Kumar Bej	13,465	8.17	▼28.46
NOTA	None of the above	725	0.44	−
Majority		33,860	20.54	16.21
Turnout		1,64,807	78.09	7.08
Registered electors		2,11,057		
BJD gain from INC				

=== 2009 ===
In 2009 election, Indian National Congress candidate Debiprasanna Chand defeated Bharatiya Janata Party candidate Aswini Kumar Patra by a margin of 6,304 votes.

2009 Vidhan Sabha Election, Jaleswar
Party	Candidate	Votes	%	±%
INC	Debiprasanna Chand	59,685	40.95	−
BJP	Aswini Kumar Patra	53,381	36.63	−
Independent	Gour Gopal Das	20,251	13.89	−
Majority		6,304	4.33 (Note: %of total valid votes)	−
Turnout		1,45,770	71.01	−
INC gain from BJP				
