= Ranendra Pratap Swain =

Indian politician

Member of Odisha Legislative Assembly
- Incumbent
- Assumed office 4 June 2024
- Preceded by: Ranendra Pratap Swain
- Constituency: Athagarh

Personal details
- Party: Biju Janata Dal
- Profession: Politician

Ranendra Pratap Swain is an Indian politician who was elected to the Odisha Legislative Assembly from Athagarh as a member of the Biju Janata Dal.
