= Karanjia Assembly constituency =

Constituency of the Odisha legislative assembly in India

Coordinates: 21.77°N 85.97°E

Karanjia
- Constituency No. 30 for the Odisha Legislative Assembly

Constituency details
- Country: India
- Region: East India
- State: Odisha
- Division: Central Division
- District: Mayurbhanj
- Lok Sabha constituency: Keonjhar
- Established: 1957
- Total electors: 2,00,408 (Note: as on 2024) (Note: as data published by election commission)
- Reservation: ST

Member of Legislative Assembly
- 17th Odisha Legislative Assembly
- Incumbent Padma Charan Haiburu
- Party: Bharatiya Janata Party
- Elected year: 2024

Karanjia is a Vidhan Sabha constituency of Mayurbhanj district, Odisha.

Area of this constituency includes Karanjia town, Karanjia block, Thakurmunda block and 9 GPs (Padmapokhari, Ramachandrapur, Labnyadeipur, Dewanbahali, Ranipokhari, Sarat, Nota, Sardiha and Kalamgadia) of Kaptipada block of Mayurbhanj district.

== Elected members ==
Vote share of winning candidates
2024	43.48%
2019	42.65%
2014	29.83%
2009	37.31%
2004	41.02%
2000	47.20%
1995	35.06%
1990	61.39%
1985	45.35%
1980	39.21%
1977	57.18%

Since its formation in 1951, 18 elections were held till date.

List of members elected from Karanjia constituency are:

Year	Member	Party
2024	Padma Charan Haiburu	Bharatiya Janata Party
2019	Basanti Hembram	Biju Janata Dal
2014	Bijay Kumar Nayak	Biju Janata Dal
2009	Bijay Kumar Nayak	Biju Janata Dal
2004	Ajit Hembram	Biju Janata Dal
2000	Padma Charan Haiburu	Independent politician
1995	Raghunath Hembram	Janata Dal
1990	Raghunath Hembram	Janata Dal
1985	Karunakar Naik	Indian National Congress
1980	Raghunath Hembram	Janata Party (Secular)
1977	Raghunath Hembram	Janata Party
1974	Karunakar Naik	Indian National Congress
1971	Prafulla Kumar Das	Swatantra Party
1967	Prafulla Kumar Das	Swatantra Party
1961	Pravakar Behera	Indian National Congress
1957	Lal Saheb Nalini Chandra Bhanj Deo	Ganatantra Parishad

== Election results ==
=== 2024 ===
Voting were held on 25 May 2024 in 3rd phase of Odisha Assembly Election & 6th phase of Indian General Election. Counting of votes was on 4 June 2024. In 2024 election, Bharatiya Janata Party candidate Padma Charan Haiburu defeated Biju Janata Dal candidate Basanti Hembram by a margin of 29,499 votes.

2024 Odisha Vidhan Sabha Election, Karanjia
Party	Candidate	Votes	%	±%
BJP	Padma Charan Haiburu	65,357	43.48	
BJD	Basanti Hembram	35,858	23.85	
INC	Laxmidhar Singh	25,471	16.94	
NOTA	None of the above	3,261	2.17	
Majority		29,499	19.63	
Turnout		1,50,319	75.01	
BJP gain from BJD				

=== 2019 ===
In 2019 election, Biju Janata Dal candidate Basanti Hembram defeated Bharatiya Janata Party candidate Padma Charan Haiburu by a margin of 8,763 votes.

2019 Vidhan Sabha Election, Karanjia
Party	Candidate	Votes	%	±%
BJD	Basanti Hembram	60,064	42.65	
BJP	Padma Charan Haiburu	51,301	36.43	
INC	Sudam Charan Naik	10,840	7.7	
NOTA	None of the above	1,989	1.41	
Majority		8,763	6.22	
Turnout		1,40,828	75.41	
BJD hold				

=== 2014 ===
In 2014 election, Biju Janata Dal candidate Bijay Kumar Nayak defeated Bharatiya Janata Party candidate Jyostna Bhansingh by a margin of 13,551 votes.

2014 Vidhan Sabha Election, Karanjia
Party	Candidate	Votes	%	±%
BJD	Bijay Kumar Nayak	38,609	29.83%	−
BJP	Jyostna Bhansingh	25,058	19.36%	−
Independent	Padma Charan Haiburu	24,030	18.56%	−
INC	Baidyanath Singh	19,226	14.85%	−
NOTA	None of the above	2,531	1.96%	−
Majority		13,551	10.47	
Turnout		1,29,444	78.13	
BJD hold				

=== 2009 ===
In 2009 election, Biju Janata Dal candidate Bijay Kumar Nayak defeated Indian National Congress candidate Jabamani Tudu by a margin of 21,401 votes.

2009 Vidhan Sabha Election, Karanjia
Party	Candidate	Votes	%	±%
BJD	Bijay Kumar Nayak	38,934	37.31	
INC	Jabamani Tudu	17,533	16.80	
BJP	Sumantra Naik	16,687	15.99	
Independent	Padma Charan Haiburu	14,597	13.99	
Majority		21,401	20.51 (Note: % of total valid votes)	
Turnout		1,04,527	68.93	
BJD hold				
