= Titlagarh Assembly constituency =

Constituency of the Odisha legislative assembly in India

Coordinates: 20.29°N 83.15°E

Titilagarh
- Constituency No. 69 for the Odisha Legislative Assembly

Constituency details
- Country: India
- Region: East India
- State: Odisha
- Division: Northern Division
- District: Balangir
- Lok Sabha constituency: Bolangir
- Established: 1951
- Total electors: 2,57,804 (Note: as on 2024) (Note: as data published by election commission)
- Reservation: None

Member of Legislative Assembly
- 17th Odisha Legislative Assembly
- Incumbent Nabin Kumar Jain
- Party: Bharatiya Janata Party
- Elected year: 2024

Titilagarh is a Vidhan Sabha constituency of Balangir district, Odisha. After 2008 Delimitation, Saintala Assembly constituency was subsumed into this constituency.

This constituency includes Titlagarh, Titilagarh block, Saintala block and Tentulikhunti (Gudvella) block.

== Elected members ==
Vote share of winning candidates
| 2024 | 48.3% |
| 2019 | 39.79% |
| 2014 | 42.07% |
| 2009 | 39.16% |
| 2004 | 55.78% |
| 2000 | 64.96% |
| 1995 | 62.21% |
| 1990 | 43.67% |
| 1985 | 43.05% |
| 1980 | 55.43% |
| 1977 | 55.91% |

Since its formation in 1951, 17 elections were held till date. It was a 2-member constituency for 1952 & 1957.

Elected members from the Titlagarh constituency are:

| Year | Member | Party |
|---|---|---|
| 2024 | Nabin Kumar Jain | Bharatiya Janata Party |
| 2019 | Tukuni Sahu | Biju Janata Dal |
| 2014 | Tukuni Sahu | Biju Janata Dal |
| 2009 | Surendra Singh Bhoi | Indian National Congress |
| 2004 | Jogendra Behera | Biju Janata Dal |
| 2000 | Jogendra Behera | Biju Janata Dal |
| 1995 | Jogendra Behera | Janata Dal |
| 1990 | Jogendra Behera | Janata Dal |
| 1985 | Purna Chandra Mahananda | Indian National Congress |
| 1980 | Lalit Mohan Gandhi | Indian National Congress (I) |
| 1977 | Lalit Mohan Gandhi | Indian National Congress |
| 1974 | Tapi Jal | Swatantra Party |
| 1971 | Tapi Jal | Swatantra Party |
| 1967 | Achyutananda Mahananda | Swatantra Party |
| 1961 | Achyutananda Mahananda | Swatantra Party |
| 1957 | Achyutananda Mahananda | Ganatantra Parishad |
| 1957 | Rajendra Narayan Singh Deo | Ganatantra Parishad |
| 1951 | Ramesh Chandra Singh Bhoi | Ganatantra Parishad |
| 1951 | Muralidhar Panda | Ganatantra Parishad |

== Election results ==
=== 2024 ===
Voting was held on 20 May 2024 in the 2nd phase of Odisha Assembly Election and the 5th phase of Indian General Election. Counting of votes was completed on 4 June 2024. In 2024 election, Bharatiya Janata Party candidate Nabin Kumar Jain defeated Biju Janata Dal candidate Tukuni Sahu by a margin of 17,399 votes.

2024 Odisha Vidhan Sabha Election, Titlagarh
| Party | Candidate | Votes | % | ±% |
|---|---|---|---|---|
| BJP | Nabin Kumar Jain | 97,854 | 48.3 | ▲22.55 |
| BJD | Tukuni Sahu | 80,455 | 39.72 | ▼0.07 |
| INC | Birendra Bag | 18,097 | 8.93 | ▼20.21 |
| NOTA | None of the above | 2,290 | 1.13 | ▼0.03 |
| Majority | | 17,399 | 8.58 | |
| Turnout | | 2,02,578 | 78.58 | |
| BJP gain from BJD | | | | |

=== 2019 ===
In 2019 election, Biju Janata Dal candidate Tukuni Sahu defeated Indian National Congress candidate Surendra Singh Bhoi by a margin of 19,587 votes.

2019 Odisha Legislative Assembly election: Titlagarh
| Party | Candidate | Votes | % | ±% |
|---|---|---|---|---|
| BJD | Tukuni Sahu | 73,172 | 39.79 | ▼2.28 |
| INC | Surendra Singh Bhoi | 53,585 | 29.14 | ▼4.72 |
| BJP | Ashok Dora | 47,341 | 25.75 | ▲10.75 |
| NOTA | None of the above | 2,025 | 1.10 | |
| Majority | | 19,587 | 10.65 | |
| Turnout | | 1,84,197 | 72.68 | |
| BJD hold | | | | |

=== 2014 ===
In 2014 election, Biju Janata Dal candidate Tukuni Sahu defeated Indian National Congress candidate Surendra Singh Bhoi by a margin of 14,022 votes.

2014 Vidhan Sabha Election, Titlagarh
| Party | Candidate | Votes | % | ±% |
|---|---|---|---|---|
| BJD | Tukuni Sahu | 71,858 | 42.07 | ▲6.19 |
| INC | Surendra Singh Bhoi | 57,836 | 33.86 | ▼5.3 |
| BJP | Mahendra Kumar Thakur | 25,617 | 15.0 | ▼2.61 |
| NOTA | None of the above | 1,748 | 1.02 | − |
| Majority | | 14,022 | 8.21 | 4.93 |
| Turnout | | 1,70,823 | 75.68 | 2.55 |
| Registered electors | | 2,25,713 | | |
| BJD gain from INC | | | | |

=== 2009 ===
In 2009 election, Indian National Congress candidate Surendra Singh Bhoi defeated Biju Janata Dal candidate Jogendra Behera by a margin of 4,838 votes.

2009 Vidhan Sabha Election, Titlagarh
| Party | Candidate | Votes | % | ±% |
|---|---|---|---|---|
| INC | Surendra Singh Bhoi | 57,753 | 39.16 | − |
| BJD | Jogendra Behera | 52,915 | 35,88 | − |
| BJP | Santanu Kumar Naik | 25,976 | 17.61 | − |
| Majority | | 4,838 | 3.28 (Note: % of total valid votes) | − |
| Turnout | | 1,47,520 | 73.13 | − |
| INC gain from BJD | | Swing | 8.02 (Note: 2004 Voter turnout was 65.11%) | |
