= Athagarh Assembly constituency =

Constituency of the Odisha legislative assembly in India

Coordinates: 20.52°N 85.63°E

Athagarh
- Constituency No. 89 for the Odisha Legislative Assembly

Constituency details
- Country: India
- Region: East India
- State: Odisha
- Division: Central Division
- District: Cuttack
- Lok Sabha constituency: Cuttack
- Established: 1951
- Total electors: 2,14,063 (Note: as on 2024) (Note: as data published by election commission)
- Reservation: None

Member of Legislative Assembly
- 17th Odisha Legislative Assembly
- Incumbent Ranendra Pratap Swain
- Party: Biju Janata Dal
- Elected year: 2024

Athagarh (Sl. No.: 89) is a Vidhan Sabha constituency of Cuttack district, Odisha.

This constituency includes Athagad NAC, Athagarh Block, Tigiria Block and 6 Gram panchayats (Kakhadi, Sankarpur, Badasamantarapur, Mangarajpur, Mahisalanda and Brahmapur) of Tangi-Chowdwar Block.

Nearby villages & towns of Tigiria Nizigarh are Baliput, Baneswarpada, Bindhanima, Biriput, Godarabandha, Bhiruda, Godijharia, achalkot, Haridapasi, Sanapatna.

Tigiria is the smallest princely state in Odisha and famous for many historical reasons. Even though as per revenue department it is a village but all facilities available within just one square kilometre.There are 2 Government High schools, two colleges, one head post office, Court, Police station, hospital everything available here. Places of Tourist attraction like Ansupa Lake (12 km), Bhatarika Temple (21 km), Dhabaleswar Temple (25 km) are nearby Tigiria.

== Elected members ==
Vote share of winning candidates
2024	49.46%
2019	60.39%
2014	69.70%
2012 (bypoll)	65.88%
2009	54.70%
2004	52.40%
2000	65.87%
1995	50.82%
1990	56.48%
1985	84.39%
1980 (bypoll)	79.85%
1980	59.68%
1977	44.60%

Since its formation in 1951, 20 elections were held till date including 3 By elections in 1967, 1980 and 2012.

List of members elected from Athagarh constituency are:

Year	Member	Party
2024	Ranendra Pratap Swain	Biju Janata Dal
2019	Ranendra Pratap Swain	Biju Janata Dal
2014	Ranendra Pratap Swain	Biju Janata Dal
2012 (bypoll) (Note: Supreme Court had declared the Athagarh assembly election of 2009 null and void.)	Ranendra Pratap Swain	Biju Janata Dal
2009	Ramesh Jena	Independent politician
2004	Ranendra Pratap Swain	Biju Janata Dal
2000	Ranendra Pratap Swain	Biju Janata Dal
1995	Ranendra Pratap Swain	Janata Dal
1990	Ranendra Pratap Swain	Janata Dal
1985	Janaki Ballabh Patnaik	Indian National Congress
1980 (bypoll) (Note: Resignation of Rasananda Sahu)	Janaki Ballabh Patnaik	Indian National Congress (I)
1980	Rasananda Sahu	Indian National Congress (I)
1977	Rasamanjari Devi	Janata Party
1974	Radhanath Rath	Independent politician
1971	Radhanath Rath	Independent politician
1967 (bypoll) (Note: Resignation of Pabitra Mohan Pradhan)	Radhanath Rath	Independent politician
1967	Pabitra Mohan Pradhan	Orissa Jana Congress
1961	Achyutananda Das	Indian National Congress
1957	Radhanath Rath	Indian National Congress
1951	Radhanath Rath	Indian National Congress

== Election results ==
=== 2024 ===
Voting were held on 25 May 2024 in 3rd phase of Odisha Assembly Election & 6th phase of Indian General Election. Counting of votes was on 4 June 2024. In 2024 election, Biju Janata Dal candidate Ranendra Pratap Swain defeated Bharatiya Janata Party candidate Abhaya Kumar Barik by a margin of 3,584 votes.

2024 Odisha Vidhan Sabha Election, Athagarh
Party	Candidate	Votes	%	±%
BJD	Ranendra Pratap Swain	86,006	49.46	
BJP	Abhaya Kumar Barik	82,422	47.40	
INC	Sudarshan Sahoo	2,405	1.38	
NOTA	None of the above	740	0.43	
Majority		3,584	2.06	
Turnout		1,73,881	81.23	
BJD hold				

=== 2019 ===
In 2019 election, Biju Janata Dal candidate Ranendra Pratap Swain defeated Bharatiya Janata Party candidate Brajendra Kumar Ray by a margin of 57,995 votes.

2019 Vidhan Sabha Election, Athagarh
Party	Candidate	Votes	%	±%
BJD	Ranendra Pratap Swain	98,114	60.39	
BJP	Brajendra Kumar Ray	40,119	24.69	
INC	Uma Ballav Rath	10,945	6.74	
NOTA	None of the above	896	0.55	
Majority		57,995	35.7	
Turnout		1,62,475	79.73	
BJD hold				

=== 2014 ===
In 2014 election, Biju Janata Dal candidate Ranendra Pratap Swain defeated Indian National Congress candidate Bichitrananda Muduli by a margin of 68,487 votes.

2014 Vidhan Sabha Election, Athagarh
Party	Candidate	Votes	%	±%
BJD	Ranendra Pratap Swain	102,605	69.70	−
INC	Bichitrananda Muduli	34,118	23.18	−
BJP	Biswa Sundar Mishra	7,132	4.84	−
NOTA	None of the above	1,572	1.07	−
Majority		68,487	46.52	
Turnout		1,47,212	79.84	
BJD hold				

=== 2012 Bypoll ===
In 2012 by-election, Biju Janata Dal candidate Ranendra Pratap Swain defeated Indian National Congress candidate Suresh Mohapatra by a margin of 47,390 votes.

2012 Vidhan Sabha Bye-Election, Athagarh
Party	Candidate	Votes	%	±%
BJD	Ranendra Pratap Swain	87,604	65.88	−
INC	Suresh Mohapatra	40,214	30.24	−
BJP	Bikram Das	2,452	1.79	−
Majority		47,390	35.64	−
Turnout		1,25,949	72.26	−
BJD gain from Independent				

=== 2009 ===
In 2009 election, Independent candidate Ramesh Rout defeated Independent candidate Bichitrananda Muduli by a margin of 30,351 votes.

2009 Vidhan Sabha Election, Athagarh
Party	Candidate	Votes	%	±%
Independent	Ramesh Rout	68,881	54.70	−
Independent	Bichitrananda Muduli	43,371	34.44	−
INC	Subas Mohanty	7,376	5.86	−
BJP	Rama Narayan Mohanty	3,355	2.66	−
Majority		25,590	20.32 (Note: %of total valid votes)	−
Turnout		1,25,949	72.26	−
Registered electors		1,74,301		
Independent gain from BJD				
