= Nabin Kumar Jain =

Indian politician

Member of Odisha Legislative Assembly
- Incumbent
- Assumed office 4 June 2024
- Preceded by: Tukuni Sahu
- Constituency: Titlagarh

Personal details
- Party: Bharatiya Janata Party
- Profession: Politician

Nabin Kumar Jain is an Indian politician. He was elected to the Odisha Legislative Assembly from Titlagarh as a member of the Bharatiya Janata Party.
