= Bissam Cuttack Assembly constituency =

Constituency of the Odisha legislative assembly in India

Coordinates: 19.51°N 83.51°E

Bissam Cuttack
- Constituency No. 139 for the Odisha Legislative Assembly
- Bissam Cuttack Assembly constituency in Rayagada district

Constituency details
- Country: India
- Region: East India
- State: Odisha
- District: Rayagada
- Lok Sabha constituency: Koraput
- Established: 1951
- Total electors: 2,34,292 (Note: as on 2024) (Note: as data published by election commission)
- Reservation: ST

Member of Legislative Assembly
- 17th Odisha Legislative Assembly
- Incumbent Nilamadhab Hikaka
- Party: Indian National Congress
- Elected year: 2024

Bissam Cuttack is a Vidhan Sabha constituency of Rayagada district, Odisha.

Map of Bissam Cuttack Constituency

This constituency includes Bissam Cuttack block, Kalyansinghpur block, Kolnara block and Muniguda block.

== Elected members ==
Vote share of winning candidates
2024	37.25%
2019	38.27%
2014	43.74%
2009	34.50%
2004	46.86%
2000	46.89%
1995	62.98%
1990	52.74%
1985	66.45%
1980	75.98%
1977	59.56%

Since its formation in 1951, 16 elections were held till date.

List of members elected from Bissam Cuttack constituency are:

Year	Member	Party
2024	Nilamadhab Hikaka	Indian National Congress
2019	Jagannath Saraka	Biju Janata Dal
2014	Jagannath Saraka	Biju Janata Dal
2009	Dambarudhara Ulaka	Indian National Congress
2004	Dambarudhara Ulaka	Indian National Congress
2000	Sarangdhar Kadraka	Biju Janata Dal
1995	Dambarudhara Ulaka	Indian National Congress
1990	Sarangdhar Kadraka	Janata Dal
1985	Dambarudhara Ulaka	Indian National Congress
1980	Dambarudhara Ulaka	Indian National Congress
1977	Dambarudhara Ulaka	Indian National Congress
1974	Dambarudhara Ulaka	Indian National Congress
1971	Praska Sreepathi	Swatantra Party
1967	Biswanath Choudhury	Swatantra Party
1961	Biswanath Choudhury	Swatantra Party
1956-1960 : Constituency did not exist
1951	Syamaghana Ulaka	Ganatantra Parishad

== Election results ==
=== 2024 ===
Voting were held on 13 May 2024 in 1st phase of Odisha Assembly Election & 4th phase of Indian General Election. Counting of votes was on 4 June 2024. In 2024 election, Indian National Congress candidate Nilamadhaba Hikaka defeated Biju Janata Dal candidate Jagannath Saraka by a margin of 9,403 votes.

2024 Odisha Vidhan Sabha Election: Bissam Cuttack
Party	Candidate	Votes	%	±%
INC	Nilamadhab Hikaka	68,446	37.25	▲6.14
BJD	Jagannath Saraka	59,043	32.13	▼6.69
BJP	Jagannath Nundurka	25,480	13.87	▲0.18
NOTA	None of the above	5,256	2.86	▼0.28
Majority		9,403	5.12	▼2.59
Turnout		1,83,770	78.44	▼0.25
INC gain from BJD				

=== 2019 ===
In 2019 election, Biju Janata Dal candidate Jagannath Saraka defeated Indian National Congress candidate Nilamadhab Hikaka by a margin of 13,332 votes.

2019 Odisha Vidhan Sabha Election: Bissam Cuttack
Party	Candidate	Votes	%	±%
BJD	Jagannath Saraka	66,150	38.27	
INC	Nilamadhab Hikaka	52,818	30.56	
BJP	Siba Sankar Ulaka	23,665	13.69	
NOTA	None of the above	5,434	3.14	
Majority		13,332	7.71	
Turnout		1,72,838	78.69	
BJD hold				

=== 2014 ===
In 2014 election, Biju Janata Dal candidate Jagannath Saraka defeated Indian National Congress candidate Dambarudhar Ulaka by a margin of 29,186 votes.

2014 Odisha Vidhan Sabha Election: Bissam Cuttack
Party	Candidate	Votes	%	±%
BJD	Jagannath Saraka	72,366	43.74	▲9.5
INC	Dambarudhar Ulaka	43,180	26.1	▼8.4
BJP	Sarangadhara Kadraka	18,415	11.13	▲5.48
NOTA	None of the above	4,910	2.97	−
Majority		29,186	17.64	▲17.39
Turnout		1,65,442	81.14	▲9.75
Registered electors		2,03,899		
BJD gain from INC				

=== 2009 ===
In 2009 election, Indian National Congress candidate Dambarudhar Ulaka defeated Biju Janata Dal candidate Jagannath Saraka by a margin of 349 votes.

2009 Odisha Vidhan Sabha Election: Bissam Cuttack
Party	Candidate	Votes	%	±%
INC	Dambarudhara Ulaka	47,555	34.50	▲12.36
BJD	Jagannath Saraka	47,206	34.24	▲0.21
BSP	Subardani Wadaka	14,074	10.21	−
BJP	Bidulata Huika	7,785	5.65	−
Majority		349	0.25 (Note: %of total valid votes)	−
Turnout		1,37,861	71.39 (Note: 2004 Voter turnout was 68.24%)	▲3.15
INC hold				
