= Bhanjanagar Assembly constituency =

Constituency of the Odisha legislative assembly in India

Coordinates: 19.93°N 84.58°E

Bhanjanagar
- Constituency No. 123 for the Odisha Legislative Assembly
- Bhanjanagar Assembly constituency in Ganjam district

Constituency details
- Country: India
- Region: East India
- State: Odisha
- Division: Southern Division
- District: Ganjam
- Lok Sabha constituency: Kandhamal
- Established: 1957
- Total electors: 2,39,901 (Note: as on 2024) (Note: as data published by election commission)
- Reservation: None

Member of Legislative Assembly
- 17th Odisha Legislative Assembly
- Incumbent Pradyumna Kumar Nayak
- Party: Bharatiya Janata Party
- Elected year: 2024

Bhanjanagar is a Vidhan Sabha constituency of Ganjam district. Following 2008 delimitation, Jaganathprasad Assembly constituency was subsumed into this constituency.

Area of this constituency includes 22 Gram panchayat (From 141 villages) and 2 blocks namely (Bhanjanagar block) Bhanjanagar, (Jagannathaprasad block) Jagannath Prasad, Ganjam.

== Elected members ==
Vote share of winning candidates
2024	51.06%
2019	48.56%
2014	56.21%
2009	76.50%
2004	52.71%
2000	54.69%
1995	48.15%
1990	63.86%
1985	57.43%
1980	46.48%
1977	58.12%

Since its formation in 1957, 16 elections were held till date. It was a 2-member constituency in 1957.

List of members elected from Bhanjanagar constituency are:

Year	Member	Party
2024	Pradyumna Kumar Nayak	BJP
2019	Bikram Keshari Arukha	BJD
2014	Bikram Keshari Arukha	BJD
2009	Bikram Keshari Arukha	BJD
2004	Bikram Keshari Arukha	BJD
2000	Bikram Keshari Arukha	BJD
1995	Bikram Keshari Arukha	JD
1990	Ramakrushna Gouda	JD
1985	Umakanta Mishra	Indian National Congress
1980	Somanath Rath	Indian National Congress (I)
1977	J.Subharao Prusty	Janata Party
1974	Somanath Rath	Indian National Congress
1971	Somanath Rath	Indian National Congress (R)
1967	Dinabandhu Behera	Indian National Congress
1961	Maguni Charan Pradhan	Indian National Congress
1957 (Note: It was a 2 member constituency)	Suma Naik	Communist Party of India
1957	Govind Pradhan	Communist Party of India

== Election results ==
=== 2024 ===
Voting were held on 20 May 2024 in 2nd phase of Odisha Assembly Election & 5th phase of Indian General Election. Counting of votes was on 4 June 2024. In 2024 election, Bharatiya Janata Party candidate Pradyumna Kumar Nayak defeated Biju Janata Dal candidate Bikram Keshari Arukha by a margin of 16,324 votes.

2024 Odisha Vidhan Sabha Election, Bhanjanagar
Party	Candidate	Votes	%	±%
BJP	Pradyumna Kumar Nayak	83,822	51.06	
BJD	Bikram Keshari Arukha	67,498	41.11	
INC	Prasanta Kumar Bisoyi	5,136	3.13	
NOTA	None of the above	1,941	1.18	
Majority		16,324	9.95	
Turnout		1,64,171	68.43	
BJP gain from BJD				

=== 2019 ===
In 2019 election, Biju Janata Dal candidate Bikram Keshari Arukha defeated Bharatiya Janata Party candidate Pradyumna Kumar Nayak by a margin of 9,103 votes.

2019 Vidhan Sabha Election, Bhanjanagar
Party	Candidate	Votes	%	±%
BJD	Bikram Keshari Arukha	76,879	48.56	
BJP	Pradyumna Kumar Nayak	67,776	42.81	
INC	Sanjay Kumar Tripathy	7,069	4.47	
NOTA	None of the above	1,441	0.91	
Majority		9,103	5.75	
Turnout		1,58,302	68.72	
BJD hold				

=== 2014 ===
In 2014 election, Biju Janata Dal candidate Bikram Keshari Arukha defeated Indian National Congress candidate Binayak Tripathy by a margin of 31,730 votes.

2014 Vidhan Sabha Election, Bhanjanagar
Party	Candidate	Votes	%	±%
BJD	Bikram Keshari Arukha	82,467	56.21	▼20.29
INC	Binayak Tripathy	50,766	34.6	▲20.11
BJP	Pradeep Kumar Sahu	7,834	5.34	▲0.08
NOTA	None of the above	2,807	1.91	
Majority		31,701	21.6	
Turnout		1,46,711	69.87	
BJD hold				

=== 2009 ===
In 2009 election, Biju Janata Dal candidate Bikram Keshari Arukha defeated Indian National Congress candidate Debi Prasad Bisoyi by 73,367 votes.

2009 Vidhan Sabha Election, Bhanjanagar
Party	Candidate	Votes	%	±%
BJD	Bikram Keshari Arukha	90,515	76.50	−
INC	Debi Prasad Bisoyi	17,148	14.49	−
BJP	Shibananda Tripathy	6,228	5.26	−
Majority		73,367	62.01	−
Turnout		1,18,328	59.93	−
BJD hold				
