= Sukinda Assembly constituency =

Assembly constituency in Odisha

Coordinates: 20.96°N 85.92°E

Sukinda
- Constituency No. 54 for the Odisha Legislative Assembly

Constituency details
- Country: India
- Region: East India
- State: Odisha
- Division: Central Division
- District: Jajpur
- Lok Sabha constituency: Jajpur
- Established: 1951
- Total electors: 2,11,032 (Note: as on 2024) (Note: as data published by election commission)
- Reservation: None

Member of Legislative Assembly
- 17th Odisha Legislative Assembly
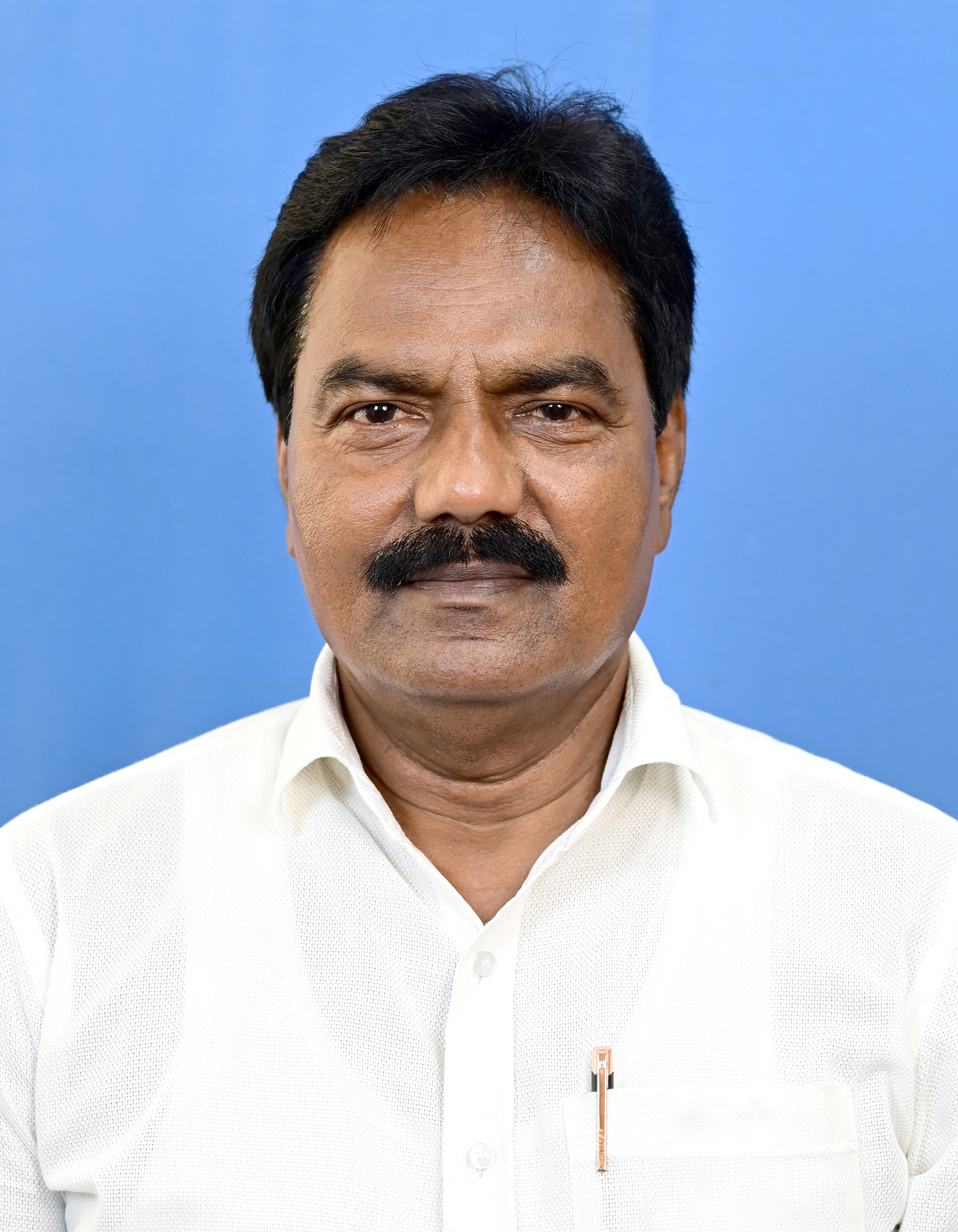
- Incumbent Pradeep Bal Samanta
- Party: Bharatiya Janata Party
- Elected year: 2024

Sukinda is a Vidhan Sabha constituency of Jajpur district, Odisha, India.

The area of this constituency includes Sukinda and Danagadi blocks.

== Elected members ==
Vote share of winning candidates
2024	50.56%
2019	48.20%
2014	39.84%
2009	47.71%
2004	51.17%
2000	63.04%
1995	45.81%
1990	54.50%
1985	38.68%
1980	42.42%
1977	40.04%

Since its formation in 1951, 17 elections have been held to date including one bypoll in 1955.

The list of members elected from the Sukinda constituency are:

Year	Member	Party
2024	Pradeep Bal Samanta	Bharatiya Janata Party
2019	Pritiranjan Gharai	Biju Janata Dal
2014	Pritiranjan Gharai	Biju Janata Dal
2009	Prafulla Chandra Ghadai	Biju Janata Dal
2004	Prafulla Chandra Ghadai	Biju Janata Dal
2000	Prafulla Chandra Ghadai	Biju Janata Dal
1995	Prafulla Chandra Ghadai	Janata Dal
1990	Prafulla Chandra Ghadai	Janata Dal
1985	Sarat Rout	Indian National Congress
1980	Sarat Rout	Indian National Congress (I)
1977	Anandamanjari Debi	Janata Party
1974	Sanatan Deo	Indian National Congress
1971	Sanatan Deo	Utkal Congress
1967	Anandamanjari Debi	Orissa Jana Congress
1961	Baidhar Singh	Indian National Congress
1957-1960 : Constituency didn't exist
1955 (bypoll) (Note: Resignation of Pitambar Bhupati Harichandan Mohapatra)	Narayan Chandra Pati	Praja Socialist Party
1951	Pitambar Bhupati Harichandan Mohapatra	Independent politician

== Election results ==
=== 2024 ===
Voting were held on 1st June 2024 in 4th phase of Odisha Assembly Election & 7th phase of Indian General Election. Counting of votes was on 4th June 2024. In 2024 election, Bharatiya Janata Party candidate Pradeep Bal Samanta defeated Biju Janata Dal candidate Pritiranjan Gharai by a margin of 9,577 votes.

2024 Odisha Legislative Assembly election: Sukinda
Party	Candidate	Votes	%	±%
BJP	Pradeep Bal Samanta	86,733	50.56	▲12.77
BJD	Pritiranjan Gharai	77,156	44.98	▼3.22
INC	Bibhu Bushan Rout	3,677	2.14	▼9.44
NOTA	None of the above	1,185	0.69	▲0.1
Majority		9,577	5.58	▼2.94
Turnout		1,71,536	81.28	
BJP gain from BJD		Swing		

=== 2019 ===
In 2019 election, Biju Janata Dal candidate Pritiranjan Gharai defeated Bharatiya Janata Party candidate Pradeep Bal Samanta by a margin of 16,730 votes.

2019 Odisha Legislative Assembly election: Sukinda
Party	Candidate	Votes	%	±%
BJD	Pritiranjan Gharai	77,510	48.2	▲9.36
BJP	Pradeep Bal Samanta	60,780	37.79	▲35.23
INC	Sarat Raut	18,619	11.58	▼25.04
NOTA	None of the above	941	0.59	▼0.09
Majority		16,730	8.52	▼5.3
Turnout		1,45,890	79.61	▼5.11
Registered electors		1,96,255		
BJD hold		Swing	{{{swing}}}	

=== 2014 ===
In 2014 election, Biju Janata Dal candidate Pritiranjan Gharai defeated Indian National Congress candidate Sarat Raut by a margin of 4,704 votes.

2014 Vidhan Sabha Election, Sukinda
Party	Candidate	Votes	%	±%
BJD	Pritiranjan Gharai	58,122	39.84	▼7.87
INC	Sarat Raut	53,418	36.62	▼9.14
Independent	Pradeep Bal Samanta	17,927	12.29	
AOP	Rabindranath Jarika	6,314	4.33	
BJP	Abhina Kumar Hota	3,738	2.56	0.59
NOTA	None of the above	994	0.68	−
Majority		4,704	3.22	1.27
Turnout		1,45,890	84.72	8.28
Registered electors		1,72,208		
BJD hold				

=== 2009 ===
In 2009 election, Biju Janata Dal candidate Prafulla Chandra Ghadai defeated Indian National Congress candidate Sarat Rout by a margin of 2,403 votes.

2009 Vidhan Sabha Election, Sukinda
Party	Candidate	Votes	%	±%
BJD	Prafulla Chandra Ghadai	58,765	47.71	−
INC	Sarat Raut	56,362	45.76	−
BJP	Dola Gobinda Mohanta	2,428	1.97	−
Majority		2,403	1.95 (Note: % of total valid votes)	−
Turnout		1,23,193	76.44	−
BJD hold				
