= Nimapara Assembly constituency =

Constituency of the Odisha legislative assembly in India

Coordinates: 20.06°N 86.00°E

Nimapara
- Constituency No. 106 for the Odisha Legislative Assembly
- Nimapara Assembly constituency in Puri district

Constituency details
- Country: India
- Region: East India
- State: Odisha
- Division: Central Division
- District: Puri
- Lok Sabha constituency: Jagatsinghpur
- Established: 1961
- Total electors: 2,47,961 (Note: as on 2024) (Note: as data published by election commission)
- Reservation: None

Member of Legislative Assembly
- 17th Odisha Legislative Assembly
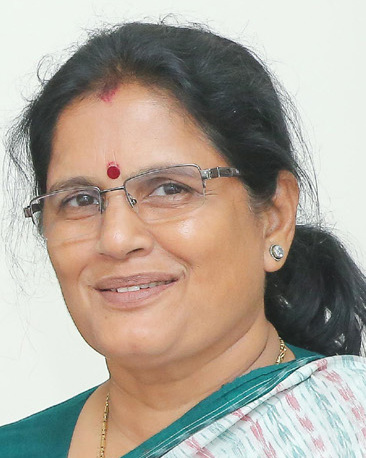
- Incumbent Pravati Parida; Deputy Chief Minister of Odisha
- Party: Bharatiya Janata Party
- Elected year: 2024

Nimapara is a Vidhan Sabha constituency of Puri district, Odisha.

This constituency includes Nimapada, Nimapada block and 14 Gram panchayats (Nuakholamara, Rahangorada, Andhra Ichhapur, Ganeswarpur, Gop, Bedapur, Badatara, Nagapur, Bantaligram, Baniasahi, Erabanga, Kuanpada and Payara) of Gop block.

== Elected members ==
Vote share of winning candidates
2024	48.45%
2019	48.96%
2014	51.62%
2009	53.50%
2004	45.51%
2000	46.82%
1995	31.45%
1990	69.13%
1985	40.18%
1980	41.95%
1977	41.99%

Since its formation in 1961, 15 elections were held till date.

List of members elected from Nimapara constituency are:

Year	Member	Party
2024	Pravati Parida	Bharatiya Janata Party
2019	Samir Ranjan Dash	Biju Janata Dal
2014	Samir Ranjan Dash	Biju Janata Dal
2009	Samir Ranjan Dash	Biju Janata Dal
2004	Baidhar Mallick	Bharatiya Janata Party
2000	Baidhar Mallick	Bharatiya Janata Party
1995	Rabindra Kumar Sethy	Indian National Congress
1990	Benudhar Sethi	Janata Dal
1985	Rabindra Kumar Sethy	Indian National Congress
1980	Rabindra Kumar Sethy	Indian National Congress (I)
1977	Gobinda Chandra Sethi	Janata Party
1974	Nilamani Sethy	Indian National Congress
1971	Gobinda Chandra Sethi	Utkal Congress
1967	Nilamani Sethy	Orissa Jana Congress
1961	Gobinda Chandra Sethi	Indian National Congress

== Election results ==
=== 2024 ===
Voting were held on 1 June 2024 in 4th phase of Odisha Assembly Election & 7th phase of Indian General Election. Counting of votes was on 4 June 2024. In 2024 election, Bharatiya Janata Party candidate Pravati Parida defeated Biju Janata Dal candidate Dilip Kumar Nayak by a margin of 4,588 votes.

2024 Odisha Vidhan Sabha Election, Nimapara
Party	Candidate	Votes	%	±%
BJP	Pravati Parida	95,430	48.45	▲17.28
BJD	Dilip Kumar Nayak	90,842	46.12	▼2.84
INC	Siddharth Routray	7,066	3.59	▼14.44
NOTA	None of the above	451	0.23	▼0.14
Majority		4,588	2.33	▼15.46
Turnout		1,96,968	79.44	
BJP gain from BJD				

=== 2019 ===
In 2019 election, Biju Janata Dal candidate Samir Ranjan Dash defeated Bharatiya Janata Party candidate Pravati Parida by a margin of 32,008 votes.

2019 Odisha Vidhan Sabha Election, Nimapara
Party	Candidate	Votes	%	±%
BJD	Samir Ranjan Dash	91,160	48.96	
BJP	Pravati Parida	59,152	31.17	
INC	Dillip Kumar Nayak	33,576	18.03	
NOTA	None of the above	684	0.37	
Majority		32,008	17.79	
Turnout		1,86,198	77.27	
BJD hold				

=== 2014 ===
In 2014 election, Biju Janata Dal candidate Samir Ranjan Dash defeated Bharatiya Janata Party candidate Pravati Parida by a margin of 29,637 votes.

2014 Odisha Vidhan Sabha Election, Nimapara
Party	Candidate	Votes	%	±%
BJD	Samir Ranjan Dash	86,958	51.62	
BJP	Pravati Parida	57,321	34.03	
INC	Biswaranjan Mohanty	20,748	12.32	
NOTA	None of the above	571	0.34	
Majority		29,637	17.59	
Turnout		1,68,450	76.21	
BJD hold				

=== 2009 ===
In 2009 election, Biju Janata Dal candidate Samir Ranjan Dash defeated Indian National Congress candidate Satyabrata Patra by a margin of 39,154 votes.

2009 Odisha Vidhan Sabha Election, Nimapara
Party	Candidate	Votes	%	±%
BJD	Samir Ranjan Dash	80,762	53.50	−
INC	Satyabrata Patra	41,608	27.56	−
BJP	Sankarsan Parida	19,183	12.71	−
Independent	Pravati Parida	6,820	4.52	−
Majority		39,154	25.94 (Note: % of total valid votes)	−
Turnout		1,51,004	70.74	−
BJD gain from BJP		Swing	▼0.9	
