= Samir Ranjan Dash =

Indian politician

Member of Odisha Legislative Assembly
- In office 2009–2024
- Preceded by: Baidhar Mallick
- Succeeded by: Pravati Parida (Deputy CM Of Odisha)
- Constituency: Nimapara

Personal details
- Political party: Bharatiya Janata Party
- Profession: Politician

Samir Ranjan Dash is an Indian politician from Odisha. He was a three time elected Member of the Odisha Legislative Assembly from 2009, 2014, and 2019, representing Nimapara Assembly constituency as a Member of the Biju Janata Dal.

== See also ==
- 2019 Odisha Legislative Assembly election
- Odisha Legislative Assembly
