= Aswini Kumar Patra =

Indian politician (born 1950)

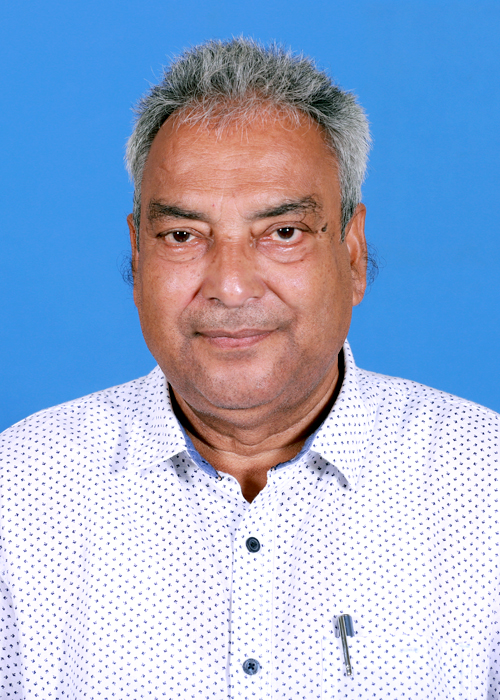

Personal details
- Born: 9 July 1950 (age 76) Balasore district, Odisha, India
- Party: Janata Dal; Bharatiya Janata Party; Biju Janata Dal
- Occupation: Politician

Member of the Odisha Assembly for Jaleswar
- In office 3 March 1990 – 15 March 1995
- Preceded by: Judhisthira Jena (Congress)
- Succeeded by: Jayanarayan Mohanty (Congress)
- In office 5 March 2000 – 19 May 2009
- Preceded by: Jayanarayana Mohanty (Congress)
- Succeeded by: Debi Prasanna Chand (Congress)
- In office 25 May 2014 – Continuing
- Preceded by: Debi Prasanna Chand (Congress)

Aswini Kumar Patra (Odia: ଅଶ୍ୱିନୀ କୁମାର ପାତ୍ର; 9 July 1950) is an Indian politician who is active in Odisha politics. Representing the Janata Dal, Bharatiya Janata Party, Biju Janata Dal, he has served four terms as an MLA in Odisha Legislative Assembly. He was elected to the 10th, 13th and 15th Odisha Legislative Assembly from the Jaleswar constituency in 1990, 2004 and 2014 elections respectively.

== Biography ==
Aswini Kumar Patra was born on 9 July 1950 in Balasore district, the son of Satchindra Nath Patra. He has a bachelor of arts degree, studied law and worked as a lawyer. He is married to Shuklata Mohanty with whom he has three daughters.

== Political career ==
In the 1990 Odisha Legislative Assembly election, Patra contested from the Jaleshwar constituency as a candidate of Janata Dal. He won this election and was elected to the 10th Odisha Legislative Assembly. Later, in the 2000 and 2004 Odisha Legislative Assembly election, he contested as a candidate of the Bharatiya Janata Party from the Jaleswar constituency. He won this election and was elected to the 12th and 13th Odisha Legislative Assemblies. In the 2014 Odisha Legislative Assembly election, Patra again contested from the Jaleshwar constituency as a Biju Janata Dal candidate. He won this election and was elected to the 15th Odisha Legislative Assembly. Patra retained his seat in the 2019 election.
