= Jagannath Saraka =

Indian politician

Cabinet Minister
- In office 29 May 2022 – 2024

Personal details
- Party: Biju Janata Dal
- Spouse: Damayanti Kilaka
- Education: Law Graduate
- Occupation: Politician

Jagannath Saraka (Odia: ଜଗନ୍ନାଥ ସାରକା, born 10 June 1973) is a politician from Odisha. He is a member of Biju Janata Dal (BJD) political party. He represented the Bissamcuttack Vidhan Sabha constituency in 2014 and 2019 assembly elections.

== Early life ==
Jagannath Saraka hails from Munda village under Jhigidi Post Office of Rayagada district. He started his career as an advocate after completing his law degree.

== Political career ==
In 2014 assembly elections, he won from the Bissam cuttack Vidhan Sabha constituency by defeating Indian National Congress candidate Dambarudhar Ulaka by a margin of 29,186 votes. In 2019, he got elected again and became a minister of state of Scheduled Caste and Schedule Tribe development, Minorities and Backward classes welfare in the ministry of Naveen Patnaik.

State Legislative Assembly
Preceded by Dambarudhara Ulaka (INC)	Member of the Odisha Legislative Assembly from Bissam Cuttack Assembly constituency 2009–	Incumbent
