= Pritiranjan Gharai =

Indian politician (born 1973)

Minister of State (Independent Charge) for Rural Development, Skill Development & Technical Education
- In office 5 June 2022 – 11 June 2024
- Preceded by: Sudam Marndi
- Succeeded by: Rabi Narayan Naik (Rural Development); Sampad Chandra Swain (Skill Development & Technical Education)
- Constituency: Sukinda

Personal details
- Born: 6 October 1973 (age 52)
- Party: Biju Janata Dal
- Spouse: Jhilik Bhattacharjee (m. 2020)
- Parent: Prafulla Chandra Ghadai

Pritiranjan Gharai (born 6 October 1973) is an Indian politician from Odisha. A member of the Biju Janata Dal (BJD), he served as the Minister of State (Independent Charge) for Rural Development, Skill Development & Technical Education in the Fifth Naveen Patnaik ministry from 2022 to 2024. He previously represented the Korei (2009–2014) and Sukinda (2014–2024) constituencies in the Odisha Legislative Assembly.

== Political career ==
Gharai was elected from Korei in 2009 and subsequently won from Sukinda in 2014 and 2019. He was inducted into the cabinet on 5 June 2022. In the 2024 elections, he lost the Sukinda seat to Pradeep Bal Samanta of the Bharatiya Janata Party.

== Personal life ==
Gharai is the son of BJD leader Prafulla Chandra Ghadai and is married to actress Jhilik Bhattacharjee.

== Political career ==
Gharai began his legislative career in 2009 when he was elected from the Korei constituency. He later shifted to the Sukinda constituency, successfully winning the seat in both the 2014 and 2019 assembly elections. On 5 June 2022, he was inducted into the Odisha state cabinet to lead the portfolios for Rural Development as well as Skill Development & Technical Education.

Gharai ran for re-election from Sukinda in the 2024 Odisha Legislative Assembly election but lost to Pradeep Bal Samanta of the Bharatiya Janata Party by a margin of 9,577 votes.

== Personal life ==
Gharai is the son of veteran BJD politician and former state minister Prafulla Chandra Ghadai. In March 2020, he married Ollywood actress Jhilik Bhattacharjee. The couple has twin daughters born in 2022.

== Career ==
He was sworn in as minister on 5 June 2022. Earlier, he was a member of the 14th & 15th Odisha Legislative Assembly. In 2024 Assembly elections he was defeated by a huge margin by BJP candidate Pradeep Bal Samanta.
