= Basanti Hembram =

Indian politician

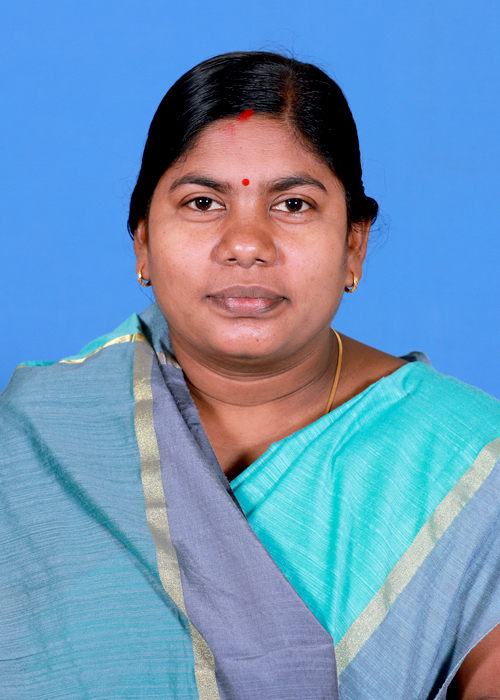

Karanjia
- Governor: Ganeshi Lal
- Constituency: Karanjia
- Incumbent
- Assumed office 2019
- Preceded by: Bijay Naik
- Incumbent
- Assumed office 2019
- Constituency: Karanjia

Personal details
- Party: BJD
- Spouse: Bir Birsing Hembram
- Education: Bachelor of Arts

Basanti Hembram is an Indian politician representing the Biju Janta Dal party. She was elected as the Member of Legislative Assembly in 2019 from Karanjia, Odisha and won by 8763 votes. In January 2021, villagers from Kadamodaka village stopped her convoy and made her walk 7 km to inspect the damage done by elephants in the area. However, she later said that she herself stopped to inquire and know more about the problems.
