= 10th Orissa Legislative Assembly =

10th state legislature of the Indian state of Orissa

←	9th Assembly	11th Assembly	→
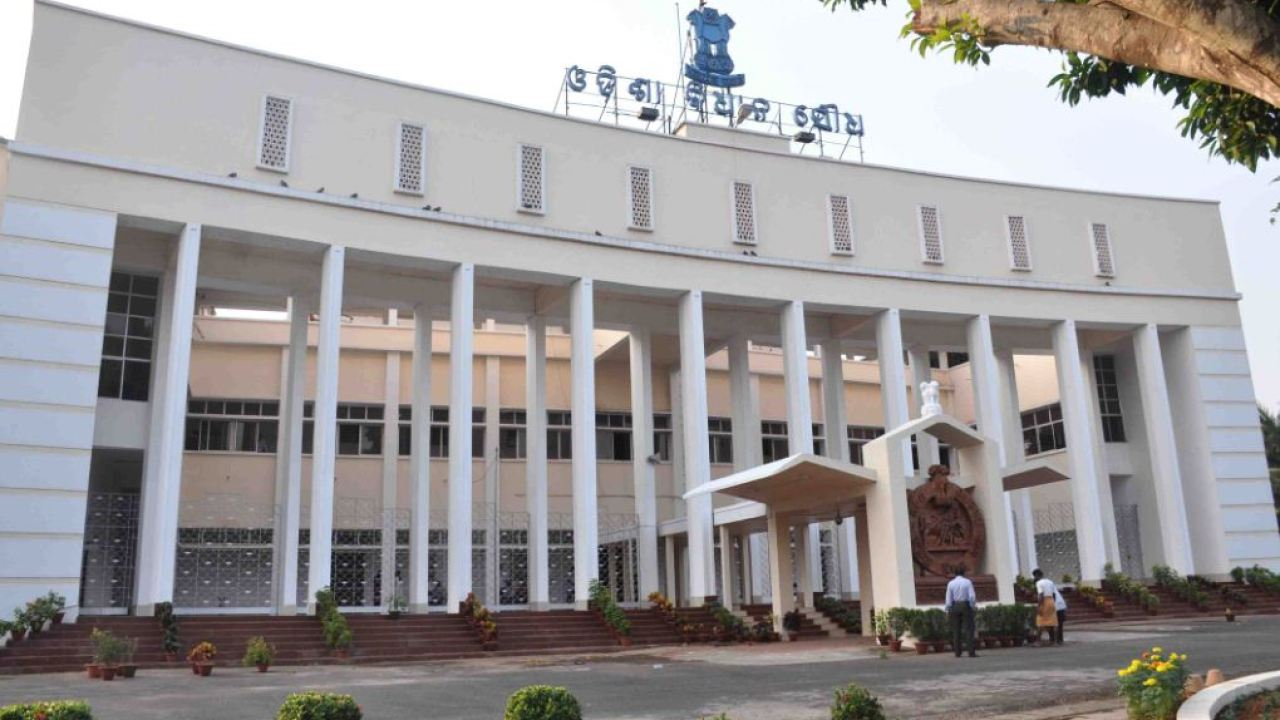
- Front view of Odisha Vidhan Saudha, Bhubaneshwar (2010)

Overview
- Meeting place: Odisha Vidhan Saudha, Bhubaneshwar, Orissa, India
- Term: 3 March 1990 – 15 March 1995
- Election: 1990 Orissa Legislative Assembly election
- Government: Janata Dal
- Opposition: Indian National Congress
- Website: assembly.odisha.gov.in

Orissa Legislative Assembly
- House Composition as assembly begins
- Members: 147
- Governor: Yagya Dutt Sharma; Saiyid Nurul Hasan (Acting); B. Satya Narayan Reddy
- Speaker: Yudhistir Das, JD
- Deputy Speaker: Prahlad Dora, JD
- Leader of the House (Chief Minister): Biju Patnaik, JD
- Leader of Opposition: No Official Opposition (Note: No party was able to secure 10% of the assembly strength i.e. 14 Seats)
- Party control: Janata Dal (123/147)
- 17 Sessions with 239 Sittings

The Tenth Orissa Legislative Assembly was convened after 1990 Orissa Legislative Assembly election.

== Brief history ==
The Congress Party which was in power from 1980 to 1990 had lost the confidence of the people because of continuous intra-party squabbles and allegation of corruption. Janata Dal led by Biju Patnaik came to power after winning in landslide 123 seats. Chief Minister Biju Patnaik along with 9 Cabinet Ministers, 5 Minister of State and 1 Deputy Minister were administered the oath of office and secrecy by Governor Yagya Dutt Sharma on 15 March 1990. Further cabinet was expanded/reshuffled on 24 July 1990, 1 January 1991, 4 December 1991 and 4 January 1993. Shri Patnaik resigned on 15 March 1995 following his party's defeat in 1995 Odisha Legislative Assembly election.

== House Composition ==
Party	Strength	
Party	Assembly Begins	Assembly Dissolves
Janata Dal	123	116
Indian National Congress	10	10
Communist Party of India	5	5
Bharatiya Janata Party	2	3
Communist Party of India (Marxist) / Orissa Communist Party	1	1
Independent	6	8

== Office Bearers ==
Post	Portrait	Name	Tenure		Party
Governor		Yagya Dutt Sharma	Assembly Begins	1 February 1993	N/A
Governor		Saiyid Nurul Hasan (Additional Charge)	1 February 1993	31 May 1993	N/A
Governor		B. Satya Narayan Reddy	1 June 1993	Assembly Dissolves	N/A
Speaker		Yudhistir Das; MLA from Kissannagar	9 March 1990	22 March 1995	Janata Dal
Deputy Speaker		Prahlad Dora; MLA from Chitrakonda	20 March 1990	15 March 1995	Janata Dal
Leader of the House (Chief Minister); Leader of JD Legislature Party		Biju Patnaik; MLA from Bhubaneswar	5 March 1990	15 March 1995	Janata Dal
Minister for Parliamentary Affairs		Bijoy Mohapatra; MLA from Patkura	15 March 1990	15 March 1995	Janata Dal
Leader of Opposition	No Official Opposition				
Pro tem Speaker		Ghasiram Majhi; MLA from Nawapara	5 March 1990	7 March 1990	Janata Dal

== Council of Ministers ==
Source
Portfolio	Portrait	Name Constituency	Tenure		Party
Chief Minister; General Administration; Other departments not allocated to any Minister.		Biju Patnaik; MLA from Bhubaneswar	15 March 1990	15 March 1995	JD
Power; Mines & Geology; Community Development & Rural Reconstruction; Tourism; Sports & Culture; Youth Services; Information & Public Relations; Commerce and Transport; Food & Civil Supplies		Biju Patnaik; MLA from Bhubaneswar	15 March 1990	24 July 1990	JD
Planning & Coordination; Science & Technology; Industries; Harijan & Tribal Welfare; Labour & Employment; Fisheries & Animal Husbandry		Biju Patnaik; MLA from Bhubaneswar	15 March 1990	1 January 1991	JD
Home		Biju Patnaik; MLA from Bhubaneswar	15 March 1990	4 January 1993	JD
Steel & Mines		Biju Patnaik; MLA from Bhubaneswar	24 July 1990	15 March 1995	JD
Energy; Finance; Public Grievances & Pension		Biju Patnaik; MLA from Bhubaneswar	24 July 1990	1 January 1991	JD
Science & Technology		Biju Patnaik; MLA from Bhubaneswar	1 January 1991	15 March 1995	JD
Aviation in Commerce and Transport		Biju Patnaik; MLA from Bhubaneswar	4 December 1991	15 March 1995	JD
Environment		Biju Patnaik; MLA from Bhubaneswar	4 December 1991	4 January 1993	JD
Home (except Jails); Handlooms & Textiles; Public Enterprises; Planning & Coordination		Biju Patnaik; MLA from Bhubaneswar	4 January 1993	15 March 1995	JD
Cabinet Minister
Works; Housing & Urban Development		Nalinikanta Mohanty; MLA from Rajanagar	15 March 1990	15 March 1995	JD
Law		Narasingha Mishra; MLA from Loisingha	15 March 1990	15 March 1995	JD
Forest; Environment		Adwait Prasad Singh; MLA from Angul	15 March 1990	1 January 1991	JD
Forest & Environment		Harish Chandra Buxipatra; MLA from Koraput	1 January 1991	4 December 1991	JD
Forest		Harish Chandra Buxipatra; MLA from Koraput	4 December 1991	4 January 1993	JD
Forest		Adwait Prasad Singh; MLA from Angul	4 January 1993	15 March 1995	JD
Irrigation; Parliamentary Affairs		Bijoy Mohapatra; MLA from Patkura	15 March 1990	15 March 1995	JD
Education in Education & Youth Services		Chaitanya Prasad Majhi; MLA from Rairangpur	15 March 1990	1 January 1991	JD
Education		Chaitanya Prasad Majhi; MLA from Rairangpur	1 January 1991	4 January 1993	JD
Higher Education in Education		Chaitanya Prasad Majhi; MLA from Rairangpur	4 January 1993	15 March 1995	JD
Health & Family Welfare		Ghasiram Majhi; MLA from Nawapara	15 March 1990	1 January 1991	JD
Health & Family Welfare		Bairagi Jena; MLA from Chandabali	1 January 1991	4 January 1993	JD
Health		Sayed Mustafiz Ahmed; MLA from Cuttack City	4 January 1993	15 March 1995	JD
Agriculture		Jagannath Mallick; MLA from Jajpur	15 March 1990	4 January 1993	JD
Agriculture		Ram Krushna Patnaik; MLA from Kodala	4 January 1993	15 March 1995	JD
Co-operation		Jagannath Mallick; MLA from Jajpur	15 March 1990	1 January 1991	JD
Co-operation		Adwait Prasad Singh; MLA from Angul	1 January 1991	4 January 1993	JD
Co-operation		Biswabhusan Harichandan; MLA from Chilika	4 January 1993	15 March 1995	JD
Finance		Ram Krushna Patnaik; MLA from Kodala	15 March 1990	24 July 1990	JD
Finance		Bed Prakash Agarwal; MLA from Kendrapara	1 January 1991	15 March 1995	JD
Revenue		Surendra Nath Naik; MLA from Kakatpur	15 March 1990	15 March 1995	JD
Excise		Surendra Nath Naik; MLA from Kakatpur	15 March 1990	1 January 1991	JD
Excise		Prasanna Acharya; MLA from Bargarh	1 January 1991	4 January 1993	JD
Rural Development		Ram Krushna Patnaik; MLA from Kodala	24 July 1990	4 January 1993	JD
Rural Development (except Lift Irrigation & Minor Irrigation)		Prasanna Acharya; MLA from Bargarh	4 January 1993	15 March 1995	JD
Lift Irrigation & Minor Irrigation		Saharai Oram; MLA from Champua	4 January 1993	15 March 1995	JD
Industries (except Handlooms & Textiles)		Dilip Kumar Ray; MLA from Rourkela	1 January 1991	15 March 1995	JD
Harijan & Tribal Welfare		Ghasiram Majhi; MLA from Nawapara	1 January 1991	4 January 1993	JD
Tribal Welfare		Ghasiram Majhi; MLA from Nawapara	4 January 1993	15 March 1995	JD
Harijan Welfare		Jagannath Mallick; MLA from Jajpur	4 January 1993	15 March 1995	JD
Handlooms & Textiles Industries		Sayed Mustafiz Ahmed; MLA from Cuttack City	1 January 1991	4 January 1993	JD
Sports & Culture; Youth Services		Sarat Kumar Kar; MLA from Mahanga	1 January 1991	15 March 1995	JD
Information & Public Relations		Sarat Kumar Kar; MLA from Mahanga	1 January 1991	4 January 1993	JD
Information & Public Relations		Bairagi Jena; MLA from Chandabali	4 January 1993	15 March 1995	JD
Tourism		Ananga Udaya Singh Deo; MLA from Bolangir	1 January 1991	15 March 1995	JD
Commerce and Transport		Bhagabat Behera; MLA from Nayagarh	24 July 1990	4 December 1991	JD
Commerce and Transport (except Aviation)		Bhagabat Behera; MLA from Nayagarh	4 December 1991	4 January 1993	JD
Commerce and Transport (except Aviation)		Harish Chandra Buxipatra; MLA from Koraput	4 January 1993	15 March 1995	JD
Food & Civil Supplies		Biswabhusan Harichandan; MLA from Chilika	24 July 1990	4 January 1993	JD
Food & Civil Supplies		Bhagabat Behera; MLA from Nayagarh	4 January 1993	15 March 1995	JD
Panchayati Raj		Damodar Rout; MLA from Ersama	24 July 1990	4 January 1993	JD
Panchayati Raj (except Social Welfare)		Damodar Rout; MLA from Ersama	4 January 1993	15 March 1995	JD
Public Grievances & Pension		Prasanna Kumar Patasani; MLA from Khurda	1 January 1991	15 March 1995	JD
School & Mass Education		Prafulla Chandra Ghadei; MLA from Sukinda	4 January 1993	15 March 1995	JD
Energy		Kalindi Behera; MLA from Salepur	4 January 1993	15 March 1995	JD
Minister of State with Independent Charges
Planning & Coordination; Public Enterprises		Prafulla Chandra Ghadei; MLA from Sukinda	7 January 1991	4 January 1993	JD
Rural Electrification		Kalindi Behera; MLA from Salepur	7 January 1991	4 January 1993	JD
Labour & Employment		Prafulla Samal; MLA from Bhadrak	7 January 1991	15 March 1995	JD
Fisheries & Animal Husbandry		Surjya Narayan Patro; MLA from Mohana	7 January 1991	15 March 1995	JD
Family Welfare		Kamala Das; MLA from Bhograi	4 January 1993	15 March 1995	JD
Excise		Jayaram Pangi; MLA from Pottangi	4 January 1993	15 March 1995	JD
Social Welfare		Padmanabha Behera; MLA from Phulbani	4 January 1993	15 March 1995	JD
Handicraft & Cottage Industries		Chhotaray Majhi; MLA from Keonjhar	4 January 1993	15 March 1995	JD
Environment		Mangala Kisan; MLA from Rajgangpur	4 January 1993	15 March 1995	JD
Jails		Kiran Chandra Singh Deo; MLA from Kesinga	4 January 1993	15 March 1995	JD
Minister of State
Harijan & Tribal Welfare		Chhotaray Majhi; MLA from Keonjhar	15 March 1990	4 January 1993	JD
Rural Development		Saharai Oram; MLA from Champua	15 March 1990	4 January 1993	JD
Primary & Adult Education		Kamala Das; MLA from Bhograi	15 March 1990	4 January 1993	JD
Health & Family Welfare		Kamala Das; MLA from Bhograi	4 January 1993	15 March 1995	JD
Forest; Environment		Mangala Kisan; MLA from Rajgangpur	15 March 1990	1 January 1991	JD
Forest & Environment		Mangala Kisan; MLA from Rajgangpur	1 January 1991	15 March 1995	JD
Industries		Dilip Kumar Ray; MLA from Rourkela	15 March 1990	1 January 1991	JD
Industries		Jadav Majhi; MLA from Dabugam	1 January 1991	15 March 1995	JD
Health & Family Welfare		Sayed Mustafiz Ahmed; MLA from Cuttack City	15 March 1990	1 January 1991	JD
Health & Family Welfare		Trinath Naik; MLA from Hindol	1 January 1991	17 October 1992	JD
Planning & Coordination		Jadav Majhi; MLA from Dabugam	15 March 1990	1 January 1991	JD
Fisheries & Animal Husbandry		Surjya Narayan Patro; MLA from Mohana	15 March 1990	1 January 1991	JD
Labour & Employment		Prafulla Samal; MLA from Bhadrak	15 March 1990	1 January 1991	JD
Handlooms & Textiles		Prasanna Acharya; MLA from Bargarh	15 March 1990	1 January 1991	JD
Co-operation		Jayaram Pangi; MLA from Pottangi	25 July 1990	4 January 1993	JD
Agriculture		Jayaram Pangi; MLA from Pottangi	25 July 1990	1 January 1991	JD
Panchayati Raj		Padmanabha Behera; MLA from Phulbani	1 January 1991	15 March 1995	JD
Irrigation		Raghunath Hembram; MLA from Karanjia	1 January 1991	15 March 1995	JD
Works; Housing & Urban Development		Kiran Chandra Singh Deo; MLA from Kesinga	1 January 1991	4 January 1993	JD
Deputy Minister
Tourism; Sports & Culture		Padmanabha Behera; MLA from Phulbani	15 March 1990	1 January 1991	JD

== Members of Legislative Assembly ==
Source
District	AC. No.	Constituency	Member	Party	Remarks
Mayurbhanj	1	Karanjia (ST)	Raghunath Hembram	Janata Dal	
Mayurbhanj	2	Jashipur (ST)	Mangal Singh Mudi	Janata Dal	
Mayurbhanj	3	Bahalda (ST)	Khelaram Mahali	Independent	
Mayurbhanj	4	Rairangpur (ST)	Chaitanya Prasad Majhi	Janata Dal	
Mayurbhanj	5	Bangriposi (ST)	Sudam Marndi	Independent	Disqualified on 7 January 1992 under Article 190 (3) of the Constitution for a period of 3 years.
Mayurbhanj	5	Bangriposi (ST)	Vacant (since 7 January 1992)		
Mayurbhanj	6	Kuliana (ST)	Kanhu Soren	Janata Dal	
Mayurbhanj	7	Baripada	Chhatish Chandra Dhal	Janata Dal	
Mayurbhanj	8	Baisinga (ST)	Ananta Charan Majhi	Janata Dal	
Mayurbhanj	9	Khunta (ST)	Birabhadra Singh	Janata Dal	
Mayurbhanj	10	Udala (ST)	Rohidas Soren	Janata Dal	
Baleshwar	11	Bhograi	Kamala Das	Janata Dal	
Baleshwar	12	Jaleswar	Aswini Kumar Patra	Janata Dal	
Baleshwar	13	Basta	Raghunath Mohanty	Janata Dal	
Baleshwar	14	Balasore	Arun Dey	Communist Party of India	
Baleshwar	15	Soro	Kartik Mohapatra	Indian National Congress	
Baleshwar	16	Simulia	Parsuram Panigrahi	Janata Dal	
Baleshwar	17	Nilgiri	Chittaranjan Sadangi	Independent	
Baleshwar	18	Bhandaripokhari (SC)	Arjun Charan Sethi	Janata Dal	Resigned in May 1996 on his election to 10th Lok Sabha.
Baleshwar	18	Bhandaripokhari (SC)	Prafulla Kumar Jena	Janata Dal	Won in 1991 Bypoll.
Baleshwar	19	Bhadrak	Prafulla Samal	Janata Dal	
Baleshwar	20	Dhamnagar	Hrudananda Malliki	Janata Dal	Expired on 1 March 1990.
Baleshwar	20	Dhamnagar	Manas Ranjan Mallik	Janata Dal	Won in 1990 Bypoll.
Baleshwar	21	Chandbali (SC)	Bairagi Jena	Janata Dal	
Baleshwar	22	Basudevpur	Bijayshree Routray	Janata Dal	
Cuttack	23	Sukinda	Prafulla Chandra Ghadai	Janata Dal	
Cuttack	24	Korai	Ashok Kumar Das	Janata Dal	
Cuttack	25	Jajpur (SC)	Jagannath Mallick	Janata Dal	Resigned on 16 November 1994.
Cuttack	25	Jajpur (SC)	Vacant (since 16 November 1994)		
Cuttack	26	Dharamsala	Gurcharan Tikayat	Janata Dal	
Cuttack	27	Barchana	Amar Prasad Satpathy	Janata Dal	
Cuttack	28	Bari-Derabisi	Kulamani Rout	Janata Dal	
Cuttack	29	Binjharpur (SC)	Pramila Mallik	Janata Dal	
Cuttack	30	Aul	Sushree Devi	Janata Dal	
Cuttack	31	Patamundai (SC)	Radhakanta Sethy	Communist Party of India (Marxist)	
Cuttack	31	Patamundai (SC)	Radhakanta Sethy	Independent	Recognized as Independent member on 19 September 1991.
Cuttack	31	Patamundai (SC)	Radhakanta Sethy	Orissa Communist Party	Recognized as Orissa Communist Party member on 4 March 1992.
Cuttack	32	Rajnagar	Nalinikanta Mohanty	Janata Dal	
Cuttack	33	Kendrapara	Bed Prakash Agarwal	Janata Dal	
Cuttack	34	Patkura	Bijoy Mohapatra	Janata Dal	
Cuttack	35	Tirtol	Basant Kumar Biswal	Indian National Congress	
Cuttack	36	Ersama	Damodar Rout	Janata Dal	
Cuttack	37	Balikuda	Umesh Swain	Janata Dal	
Cuttack	38	Jagatsinghpur (SC)	Bishnu Charan Das	Janata Dal	
Cuttack	39	Kissannagar	Yudhistir Das	Janata Dal	Speaker
Cuttack	40	Mahanga	Sarat Kumar Kar	Janata Dal	
Cuttack	41	Salepur (SC)	Kalindi Charan Behera	Janata Dal	
Cuttack	42	Gobindpur	Rabindra Kumar Mallick	Independent	
Cuttack	43	Cuttack Sadar	Rajendra Singh	Janata Dal	
Cuttack	44	Cuttack City	Syed Mustafiz Ahmed	Janata Dal	
Cuttack	45	Choudwar	Raj Kishore Ram	Janata Dal	
Cuttack	46	Banki	Ghanasyam Sahoo	Janata Dal	
Cuttack	47	Athgarh	Ranendra Pratap Swain	Janata Dal	
Cuttack	48	Baramba	Trilochan Singh Deo	Janata Dal	
Puri	49	Balipatna (SC)	Hrusikesh Nayak	Janata Dal	
Puri	50	Bhubaneswar	Biju Patnaik	Janata Dal	Chief Minister
Puri	51	Jatni	Sarat Chandra Paikray	Janata Dal	Expelled from party on 25 January 1995.
Puri	51	Jatni	Sarat Chandra Paikray	Independent	
Puri	52	Pipli	Pradeep Maharathy	Janata Dal	
Puri	53	Nimapara (SC)	Benudhara Sethy	Janata Dal	
Puri	54	Kakatpur	Surendra Nath Naik	Janata Dal	
Puri	55	Satyabadi	Chandramadhab Mishra	Janata Dal	Expelled from party on 25 January 1995.
Puri	55	Satyabadi	Chandramadhab Mishra	Independent	
Puri	56	Puri	Braja Kishore Tripathy	Janata Dal	Resigned in May 1996 on his election to 10th Lok Sabha.
Puri	56	Puri	Umaballav Rath	Janata Dal	Won in 1991 Bypoll, Expelled from party on 25 January 1995.
Puri	56	Puri	Umaballav Rath	Independent	
Puri	57	Brahmagiri	Ajay Kumar Jena	Janata Dal	
Puri	58	Chilka	Biswabhusan Harichandan	Janata Dal	Resigned on 6 November 1994.
Puri	58	Chilka	Vacant (since 6 November 1994)		
Puri	59	Khurda	Prasanna Kumar Patasani	Janata Dal	
Puri	60	Begunia	Surendranath Mishra	Janata Dal	
Puri	61	Ranpur	Sarat Chandra Mishra	Janata Dal	
Puri	62	Nayagarh	Bhagabat Behera	Janata Dal	
Puri	63	Khandapara	Arun Kumar Pattnaik	Janata Dal	
Puri	64	Daspalla	Rudra Madhab Ray	Janata Dal	
Ganjam	65	Jaganathprasad (SC)	Madhabananda Behera	Janata Dal	
Ganjam	66	Bhanjanagar	Rama Krushna Gouda	Janata Dal	
Ganjam	67	Suruda	Shanti Devi	Janata Dal	
Ganjam	68	Aska	Duti Krushna Panda	Communist Party of India	
Ganjam	69	Kabisuryanagar	Nityananda Pradhan	Communist Party of India	
Ganjam	70	Kodala	Ram Krushna Patnaik	Janata Dal	
Ganjam	71	Khallikote	V. Sugnana Kumari Deo	Janata Dal	
Ganjam	72	Chatrapur	Parsuram Panda	Communist Party of India	
Ganjam	73	Hinjili	Harihar Sahu	Janata Dal	
Ganjam	74	Gopalpur (SC)	Rama Chandra Sethy	Janata Dal	
Ganjam	75	Berhampur	Binayak Mahapatra	Janata Dal	
Ganjam	76	Chikiti	Usha Devi	Janata Dal	
Ganjam	77	Mohana	Surjya Narayan Patro	Janata Dal	
Ganjam	78	Ramagiri (ST)	Haladhara Karji	Indian National Congress	
Ganjam	79	Parlakhemundi	Darappu Lachana Naidu	Janata Dal	
Koraput	80	Gunupur (ST)	Rama Murthy Gomango	Janata Dal	
Koraput	81	Bissam-cuttack (ST)	Sarangadhar Kadraka	Janata Dal	
Koraput	82	Rayagada (ST)	Ramachandra Ulaka	Indian National Congress	
Koraput	83	Lakshmipur (ST)	Akhilla Saunta	Janata Dal	
Koraput	84	Pottangi (ST)	Jayaram Pangi	Janata Dal	
Koraput	85	Koraput	Harish Chandra Buxipatra	Janata Dal	
Koraput	86	Malkangiri (SC)	Naka Kanaya	Janata Dal	Expired on 2 April 1992.
Koraput	86	Malkangiri (SC)	Arabinda Dhali	Bharatiya Janata Party	Won in 1992 Bypoll.
Koraput	87	Chitrakonda (ST)	Prahalad Dora	Janata Dal	Deputy Speaker
Koraput	88	Kotpad (ST)	Sadan Naik	Janata Dal	
Koraput	89	Jeypore	Raghunath Patnaik	Indian National Congress	
Koraput	90	Nowrangpur	Habibulla Khan	Indian National Congress	
Koraput	91	Kodinga (ST)	Shyamaghan Majhi	Janata Dal	
Koraput	92	Dabugam (ST)	Jadav Majhi	Janata Dal	
Koraput	93	Umarkote (ST)	Gurubari Majhi	Janata Dal	
Kalahandi	94	Nawapara	Ghasiram Majhi	Janata Dal	
Kalahandi	95	Khariar	Duryodhan Majhi	Janata Dal	
Kalahandi	96	Dharamgarh (SC)	Bharat Bhusan Bemal	Janata Dal	
Kalahandi	97	Koksara	Surendra Pattjoshi	Janata Dal	
Kalahandi	98	Junagarh	Bikram Keshari Deo	Bharatiya Janata Party	
Kalahandi	99	Bhawanipatna (SC)	Ajit Das	Janata Dal	
Kalahandi	100	Narla (ST)	Balabhadra Majhi	Janata Dal	
Kalahandi	101	Kesinga	Kiran Chandra Singh Deo	Janata Dal	
Phulabani	102	Balliguda (ST)	Bhagaban Kanhar	Janata Dal	
Phulabani	103	Udayagiri (ST)	Nagarjuna Pradhan	Indian National Congress	
Phulabani	104	Phulbani (SC)	Padmanabha Behara	Janata Dal	
Phulabani	105	Boudh	Satchidananda Dalal	Janata Dal	
Balangir	106	Titilagarh (SC)	Jogendra Behera	Janata Dal	
Balangir	107	Kantabanji	Prasanna Pal	Janata Dal	
Balangir	108	Patnagarh	Bibekananda Meher	Janata Dal	
Balangir	109	Saintala	Jangyeswar Babu	Janata Dal	
Balangir	110	Loisingha	Narasingha Mishra	Janata Dal	
Balangir	111	Bolangir	Ananga Udaya Singh Deo	Janata Dal	
Balangir	112	Sonepur (SC)	Kunduru Kushal	Janata Dal	
Balangir	113	Binka	Panchanan Mishra	Independent	
Balangir	114	Birmaharajpur	Rabirarayan Panigrahi	Janata Dal	
Dhenkanal	115	Athmallik	Nagendra Kumar Pradhan	Janata Dal	
Dhenkanal	116	Angul	Adwait Prasad Singh	Janata Dal	
Dhenkanal	117	Hindol (SC)	Trinath Nayak	Janata Dal	Expired on 17 October 1992.
Dhenkanal	117	Hindol (SC)	Patta Nayak	Janata Dal	Won in 1993 Bypoll.
Dhenkanal	118	Dhenkanal	Tathagata Satpathy	Janata Dal	
Dhenkanal	119	Gondia	Nandini Satpathy	Indian National Congress	
Dhenkanal	120	Kamakhyanagar	Prasanna Pattnaik	Janata Dal	
Dhenkanal	121	Pallahara	Nrusingha Charan Sahu	Janata Dal	
Dhenkanal	122	Talcher (SC)	Brundaban Behera	Independent	
Sambalpur	123	Padampur	Bijaya Ranjan Singh Bariha	Janata Dal	
Sambalpur	124	Melchhamunda	Murari Prasad Mishra	Janata Dal	
Sambalpur	125	Bijepur	Nikunja Bihari Singh	Janata Dal	Expired on 24 August 1991.
Sambalpur	125	Bijepur	Kishorimani Singh	Janata Dal	Won in 1991 Bypoll.
Sambalpur	126	Bhatli (SC)	Kumar Behera	Janata Dal	Disqualified on 1 December 1994 under the Tenth Schedule of the Constitution of India.
Sambalpur	126	Bhatli (SC)	Vacant (since 1 December 1994)		
Sambalpur	127	Bargarh	Prasanna Acharya	Janata Dal	
Sambalpur	128	Sambalpur	Durga Shankar Patanaik	Indian National Congress	
Sambalpur	129	Brajarajnagar	Prasanna Kumar Panda	Communist Party of India	
Sambalpur	130	Jharsuguda	Kishore Kumar Mohanty	Janata Dal	
Sambalpur	131	Laikera (ST)	Hemananda Biswal	Indian National Congress	
Sambalpur	132	Kuchinda (ST)	Brundaban Majhi	Janata Dal	
Sambalpur	133	Rairakhol (SC)	Basanta Kumar Mahanada	Janata Dal	
Sambalpur	134	Deogarh	Pradipta Ganga Deb	Janata Dal	
Sundergarh	135	Sundargarh	Bharatendra Shekhar Deo	Janata Dal	
Sundergarh	136	Talsara (ST)	Ranjeet Bhitria	Janata Dal	
Sundergarh	137	Rajgangpur (ST)	Mangala Kisan	Janata Dal	
Sundergarh	138	Biramitrapur (ST)	Satya Narayan Pradhan	Janata Dal	
Sundergarh	139	Rourkela	Dilip Kumar Ray	Janata Dal	
Sundergarh	140	Raghunathpali (ST)	Rabi Dehury	Janata Dal	
Sundergarh	141	Bonai (ST)	Jual Oram	Bharatiya Janata Party	
Keonjhar	142	Champua (ST)	Saharai Oram	Janata Dal	
Keonjhar	143	Patna	Kanhu Charan Naik	Janata Dal	
Keonjhar	144	Keonjhar (ST)	Chhotaray Majhi	Janata Dal	
Keonjhar	145	Telkoi (ST)	Niladri Nayak	Janata Dal	
Keonjhar	146	Ramchandrapur	Badri Narayan Patra	Janata Dal	
Keonjhar	147	Anandapur (SC)	Dasarathi Jena	Janata Dal	

== Bypolls ==
Source
Year	Constituency	Reason for by-poll	Winning candidate	Party
April 1990	Dhamnagar	Death of Hrudananda Malliki	Manas Ranjan Mallik	Janata Dal
November 1991	Bhandaripokhari (SC)	Resignation of Arjun Charan Sethi	Prafulla Kumar Jena	Janata Dal
November 1991	Puri	Resignation of Braja Kishore Tripathy	Umaballav Rath	Janata Dal
November 1991	Bijepur	Death of Nikunja Bihari Singh	Kishorimani Singh	Janata Dal
June 1992	Malkangiri (SC)	Death of Naka Kanaya	Arabinda Dhali	Bharatiya Janata Party
May 1993	Hindol (SC)	Death of Trinath Nayak	Patta Nayak	Janata Dal
