= 7th Orissa Legislative Assembly =

7th state legislature of the Indian state of Orissa

←	6th Assembly	8th Assembly	→
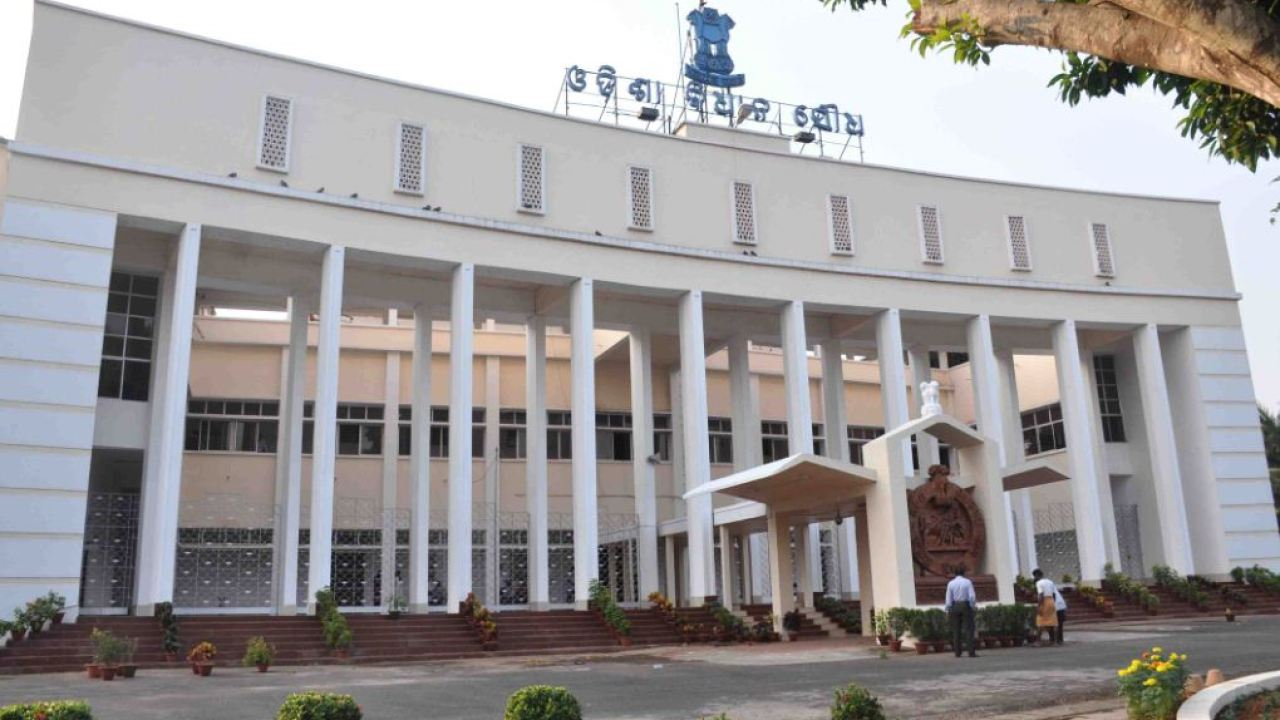
- Front view of Odisha Vidhan Saudha, Bhubaneshwar (2010)

Overview
- Meeting place: Odisha Vidhan Saudha, Bhubaneshwar, Odisha, India
- Term: 29 June 1977 – 17 February 1980
- Election: 1977 Orissa Legislative Assembly election
- Government: Janata Party
- Opposition: Indian National Congress (R); Indian National Congress (I); Orissa Janata Partry; Janata Party
- Website: assembly.odisha.gov.in

Orissa Legislative Assembly
- House Composition
- Members: 147
- Governor: Harcharan Singh Brar; Bhagwat Dayal Sharma
- Speaker: Satyapriya Mohanty, JP
- Deputy Speaker: Himansu Sekhar Padhi, JP
- Leader of the House (Chief Minister): Nilamani Routray, JP
- Leader of Opposition: Chintamani Panigrahi, INC (R); Brundaban Nayak, INC (I); Prahlad Mallik, OJP; Ananta Narayan Singh Deo, JP
- Party control: Janata Party (110/147)
- 7 Sessions with 121 Sittings

The Seventh Orissa Legislative Assembly was convened after 1977 Orissa Legislative Assembly election.

== Brief history ==
After lifting of nationwide Emergency & Janata Party's high margin win in 1977 election, PM Morarji Desai dismissed 9 Congress led state govt including Odisha by imposing President's rule under Article 356 and called snap election of these state's assemblies. Janata Party came to power after winning in landslide of 110 seats. Shri Nilamani Routray was sworn in as CM of Odisha. After Cong's landslide win in 1980 election, PM Indira Gandhi dismissed 9 opposition led state govt including Odisha by imposing President's rule under Article 356 and called snap election of these state's assemblies. Shri Routray resigned on 17 February 1980.

== House Composition ==
Party	Strength
Janata Party	110
Indian National Congress (R)	26
Communist Party of India (Marxist)	1
Communist Party of India	1
Independent	9

== Office Bearers ==
Post	Portrait	Name	Tenure		Party
Governor		Harcharan Singh Brar	Assembly Begins	22 September 1977	N/A
Governor		Bhagwat Dayal Sharma	23 September 1977	Assembly Dissolves	N/A
Speaker		Satyapriya Mohanty; MLA from Bhubaneswar	1 July 1977	17 February 1980	Janata Party
Deputy Speaker		Surendra Nath Naik; MLA from Kakatpur	27 July 1977	17 February 1980	Janata Party
Leader of the House (Chief Minister)		Nilamani Routray; MLA from Basudevpur	26 June 1977	17 February 1980	Janata Party
Leader of Opposition		Chintamani Panigrahi; MLA from Begunia	29 June 1977	20 February 1978	Indian National Congress (R)
Leader of Opposition		Brundaban Nayak; MLA from Hinjili	20 February 1978	3 September 1979	Indian National Congress (I)
Leader of Opposition		Prahlad Mallik; MLA from Patkura	3 September 1979	13 February 1980	Orissa Janata Party
Leader of Opposition		Ananta Narayan Singh Deo; MLA from Surada	13 February 1980	17 February 1980	Janata Party

== Council of Ministers ==
Source
Portfolio	Portrait	Name Constituency	Tenure		Party
Chief Minister; Home; Planning & Coordination; Political & Services (till 1979); Political & Services (except Parliamentary Affairs) (after 1979); Other departments not allocated to any Minister.		Nilamani Routray; MLA from Basudevpur	26 June 1977	17 February 1980	JP
Information & Public Relations; Labour & Employment; Housing		Nilamani Routray; MLA from Basudevpur	25 October 1979	17 February 1980	JP
Cabinet Minister
Revenue; Lift Irrigation & Power in Irrigation & Power		Pratap Chandra Mohanty; MLA from Tirtol	26 June 1977	17 February 1980	JP
Commerce in Commerce & Transport		Pratap Chandra Mohanty; MLA from Tirtol	26 June 1977	25 October 1979	JP
Commerce in Commerce & Transport		Bed Prakash Agarwal; MLA from Kendrapara	25 October 1979	17 February 1980	JP
Education & Youth Services		Pradipta Kishore Das; MLA from Jeypore	26 June 1977	25 October 1979	JP
Education & Youth Services		Pratap Chandra Mohanty; MLA from Tirtol	25 October 1979	17 February 1980	JP
Health & Family Welfare		Pradipta Kishore Das; MLA from Mahanga	26 June 1977	25 October 1979	JP
Health & Family Welfare		Ghasiram Majhi; MLA from Nawapara	25 October 1979	17 February 1980	JP
Agriculture; Co-operation		Prahlad Mallik; MLA from Patkura	26 June 1977	25 October 1979	JP
Agriculture; Co-operation		Jagannath Mallik; MLA from Jajpur	25 October 1979	17 February 1980	JP
Tribal & Rural Welfare		Prahlad Mallik; MLA from Patkura	26 June 1977	25 October 1979	JP
Tribal & Rural Welfare		Ghasiram Majhi; MLA from Nawapara	25 October 1979	17 February 1980	JP
Irrigation in Irrigation & Power		Prahlad Mallik; MLA from Patkura	26 June 1977	25 October 1979	JP
Irrigation in Irrigation & Power		Sarat Kumar Deb; MLA from Aul	25 October 1979	17 February 1980	JP
Finance		Ram Prasad Mishra; MLA from Loisingha	26 June 1977	17 February 1980	JP
Animal Husbandry in Fisheries & Animal Husbandry		Ram Prasad Mishra; MLA from Loisingha	26 June 1977	25 October 1979	JP
Forest		Natabara Pradhan; MLA from Boudh	26 June 1977	17 February 1980	JP
Fisheries in Fisheries & Animal Husbandry		Natabara Pradhan; MLA from Boudh	26 June 1977	17 February 1980	JP
Fisheries & Animal Husbandry		Natabara Pradhan; MLA from Boudh	25 October 1979	17 February 1980	JP
Works		Natabara Pradhan; MLA from Boudh	26 June 1977	25 October 1979	JP
Works		Brundaban Nayak; MLA from Hinjili	25 October 1979	17 February 1980	JP
Transport in Commerce & Transport		Natabara Pradhan; MLA from Boudh	26 June 1977		JP
Transport in Commerce & Transport		Bed Prakash Agarwal; MLA from Kendrapara	25 October 1979	17 February 1980	JP
Labour & Employment; Housing		Biswa Bhusan Harichandan; MLA from Chilka	26 June 1977	25 October 1979	JP
Food & Civil Supplies; Law		Biswa Bhusan Harichandan; MLA from Chilka	26 June 1977	25 October 1979	JP
Food & Civil Supplies; Law		Natabara Pradhan; MLA from Boudh	25 October 1979	17 February 1980	JP
Culture		Biswa Bhusan Harichandan; MLA from Chilka	26 June 1977	25 October 1979	JP
Culture		Bed Prakash Agarwal; MLA from Kendrapara	25 October 1979	17 February 1980	JP
Industries; Mines & Geology		Harish Chandra Buxipatra; MLA from Koraput	26 June 1977	17 February 1980	JP
Tourism		Harish Chandra Buxipatra; MLA from Koraput	26 June 1977	25 October 1979	JP
Tourism		Bed Prakash Agarwal; MLA from Kendrapara	25 October 1979	17 February 1980	JP
Parliamentary Affairs in Political & Services		Bed Prakash Agarwal; MLA from Kendrapara	25 October 1979	17 February 1980	JP
Rural Development		Harish Chandra Buxipatra; MLA from Koraput	26 June 1977	25 October 1979	JP
Rural Development		Brundaban Nayak; MLA from Hinjili	25 October 1979	17 February 1980	JP
Urban Development; Excise (till 1979); Excise & Prohibition (after 1979)		Jhasketan Sahu; MLA from Sambalpur	26 June 1977	17 February 1980	JP
Community Development & Social Welfare		Adwait Prasad Singh; MLA from Angul	25 October 1979	17 February 1980	JP
Minister of State
Tribal & Rural Welfare		Birabhadra Singh; MLA from Udala	26 June 1977	17 February 1980	JP
Lift Irrigation & Power in Irrigation & Power		Birabhadra Singh; MLA from Udala	25 October 1979	17 February 1980	JP
Health & Family Welfare		Ghasiram Majhi; MLA from Nawapara	26 June 1977	25 October 1979	JP
Health & Family Welfare		Maheswar Baug; MLA from Basta	25 October 1979	17 February 1980	JP
Forest		Ghasiram Majhi; MLA from Nawapara	26 June 1977	25 October 1979	JP
Forest		Raghunath Hembram; MLA from Karanjia	25 October 1979	17 February 1980	
Animal Husbandry in Fisheries & Animal Husbandry		Ghasiram Majhi; MLA from Nawapara	26 June 1977	25 October 1979	JP
Animal Husbandry in Fisheries & Animal Husbandry		Premchand Bhagat; MLA from Biramitrapur	25 October 1979	17 February 1980	JP
Community Development & Social Welfare; Public Relations in Home (till 1979); Information & Public Relations (after 1979)		Adwait Prasad Singh; MLA from Angul	26 June 1977	25 October 1979	JP
Community Development & Social Welfare; Public Relations in Home (till 1979); Information & Public Relations (after 1979)		Damodar Rout; MLA from Ersama	25 October 1979	17 February 1980	JP
Co-operation		Adwait Prasad Singh; MLA from Angul	26 June 1977	25 October 1979	JP
Co-operation		Nabin Kumar Pradhan; MLA from Bargarh	25 October 1979	17 February 1980	JP
Rural Development; Fisheries in Fisheries & Animal Husbandry		Saharai Oram; MLA from Angul	26 June 1977	17 February 1980	JP
Labour & Employment; Housing; Law (till 1979); Law (except Hindu Religious Endowments) (after 1979)		Ignace Majhi; MLA from Talsara	26 June 1977	17 February 1980	JP
Hindu Religious Endowments in Law; Agriculture		Muralidhar Guru; MLA from Bolangir	25 October 1979	17 February 1980	JP
Jails in Home; Commerce & Transport		Harihar Swain; MLA from Angul	26 June 1977	17 February 1980	JP
Tourism; Culture		Harihar Swain; MLA from Angul	25 October 1979	17 February 1980	JP
Excise & Prohibition		Rabi Singh Majhi; MLA from Umerkote	25 October 1979	17 February 1980	JP
Education & Youth Services; Culture		Kalindi Behera; MLA from Salepur	25 October 1979	17 February 1980	JP
Urban Development; Industries		Srikant Kumar Jena; MLA from Bari Derabisi	25 October 1979	17 February 1980	JP

== Members of Legislative Assembly ==
Source
District	AC. No.	Constituency	Member	Party	Remarks
Mayurbhanj	1	Karanjia (ST)	Raghunath Hemram	Janata Party	
Mayurbhanj	2	Jashipur (ST)	Kanhuram Hembram	Janata Party	
Mayurbhanj	3	Bahalda (ST)	Sunaram Soren	Janata Party	
Mayurbhanj	4	Rairangpur (ST)	Arjun Majhi	Janata Party	
Mayurbhanj	5	Bangriposi (ST)	Purusottam Naik	Janata Party	
Mayurbhanj	6	Kuliana (ST)	Niranjan Hembram	Janata Party	
Mayurbhanj	7	Baripada	Prasanna Kumar Dash	Indian National Congress (R)	
Mayurbhanj	8	Baisinga (ST)	Ram Chandar Kisku	Janata Party	
Mayurbhanj	9	Khunta (ST)	Ramesh Soren	Indian National Congress (R)	
Mayurbhanj	10	Udala (ST)	Birabhadra Singh	Janata Party	
Baleshwar	11	Bhograi	Sushant Chand	Janata Party	
Baleshwar	12	Jaleswar	Gadadhar Giri	Janata Party	
Baleshwar	13	Basta	Maheshwar Baug	Janata Party	
Baleshwar	14	Balasore	Kartik Chandar Rout	Janata Party	
Baleshwar	15	Soro	Haraprasad Mohapatra	Janata Party	
Baleshwar	16	Simulia	Gopinath Das	Janata Party	
Baleshwar	17	Nilgiri	Rajendra Chandra Mardaraj	Janata Party	
Baleshwar	18	Bhandaripokhari (SC)	Kapila Charan Sethi	Janata Party	
Baleshwar	19	Bhadrak	Ratnakar Mohanty	Janata Party	
Baleshwar	20	Dhamnagar	Hrudananda Mallick	Janata Party	
Baleshwar	21	Chandbali (SC)	Gangadhar Das	Janata Party	
Baleshwar	22	Basudevpur	Nilamani Routray	Janata Party	Chief Minister
Cuttack	23	Sukinda	Ananda Manjari Devi	Janata Party	
Cuttack	24	Korai	Ashok Kumar Das	Janata Party	
Cuttack	25	Jajpur (SC)	Jaganath Malik	Janata Party	
Cuttack	26	Dharamsala	Rabi Das	Janata Party	
Cuttack	27	Barchana	Managobinda Samal	Janata Party	
Cuttack	28	Bari-Derabisi	Srikant Kumar Jena	Janata Party	
Cuttack	29	Binjharpur (SC)	Santanu Kumar Das	Janata Party	
Cuttack	30	Aul	Sarat Kumar Deb	Janata Party	
Cuttack	31	Patamundai (SC)	Tapas Kumar Das	Janata Party	
Cuttack	32	Rajnagar	Nalinikanta Mohanty	Janata Party	
Cuttack	33	Kendrapara	Bed Prakash Agrawal	Janata Party	
Cuttack	34	Patkura	Prahallad Mallick	Janata Party	Leader of Opposition
Cuttack	35	Tirtol	Pratap Chandra Mohanty	Janata Party	
Cuttack	36	Ersama	Damodar Rout	Janata Party	
Cuttack	37	Balikuda	Umesh Swain	Janata Party	
Cuttack	38	Jagatsinghpur (SC)	Kanduri Charan Mallik	Janata Party	
Cuttack	39	Kissannagar	Batakrishna Jena	Janata Party	
Cuttack	40	Mahanga	Pradipta Kishore Das	Janata Party	
Cuttack	41	Salepur (SC)	Kalindi Charan Behera	Janata Party	
Cuttack	42	Gobindpur	Panchanan Kanungo	Janata Party	
Cuttack	43	Cuttack Sadar	Sangram Keshari Mohapatra	Janata Party	
Cuttack	44	Cuttack City	Biswanath Pandit	Janata Party	
Cuttack	45	Choudwar	Rajkishore Ram	Janata Party	
Cuttack	46	Banki	Jogesh Chandra Rout	Indian National Congress (R)	
Cuttack	47	Athgarh	Rasmanjari Devi	Janata Party	
Cuttack	48	Baramba	Trilochan Singh Deo	Independent	
Puri	49	Balipatna (SC)	Gopinath Bhoi	Janata Party	
Puri	50	Bhubaneswar	Satyapriya Mohanty	Janata Party	Speaker
Puri	51	Jatni	Suresh Kumar Routray	Janata Party	
Puri	52	Pipli	Kiran Lekha Mohanty	Janata Party	
Puri	53	Nimapara (SC)	Govinda Chandra Sethi	Janata Party	
Puri	54	Kakatpur	Surendra Nath Naik	Janata Party	Deputy Speaker
Puri	55	Satyabadi	Chandra Madhab Misra	Janata Party	
Puri	56	Puri	Braja Kishore Tripathy	Janata Party	
Puri	57	Brahmagiri	Ajay Kumar Jena	Janata Party	
Puri	58	Chilka	Biswabhusan Harichandan	Janata Party	
Puri	59	Khurda	Sudarsan Mohanty	Janata Party	
Puri	60	Begunia	Chintamani Panigrahi	Indian National Congress (R)	Leader of Opposition
Puri	61	Ranpur	Ramesh Chandra Panda	Communist Party of India (Marxist)	
Puri	62	Nayagarh	Bhagabat Behera	Janata Party	
Puri	63	Khandapara	Satyasundar Mishra	Independent	
Puri	64	Daspalla	Harihar Karan	Indian National Congress (R)	
Ganjam	65	Jaganathprasad (SC)	Udayanath Naik	Janata Party	
Ganjam	66	Bhanjanagar	Jami Subba Rao Prusty	Janata Party	
Ganjam	67	Suruda	Ananta Narayan Singh Deo	Janata Party	Leader of Opposition
Ganjam	68	Aska	Harihar Swain	Janata Party	
Ganjam	69	Kabisuryanagar	Tarini Patnaik	Janata Party	
Ganjam	70	Kodala	Ram Krushna Patnaik	Janata Party	
Ganjam	71	Khallikote	V. Sugnana Kumari Deo	Janata Party	
Ganjam	72	Chatrapur	Biswanath Sahu	Communist Party of India	
Ganjam	73	Hinjili	Brundaban Nayak	Indian National Congress (R)	Leader of Opposition
Ganjam	74	Gopalpur (SC)	Ghansyam Behera	Indian National Congress (R)	
Ganjam	75	Berhampur	Ratna Manjari Devi	Independent	
Ganjam	76	Chikiti	Jagannath Pati	Janata Party	
Ganjam	77	Mohana	Udaya Narayan Devi	Independent	
Ganjam	78	Ramagiri (ST)	Gorosang Savara	Indian National Congress (R)	
Ganjam	79	Parlakhemundi	Bijaya Kumar Jena	Independent	
Koraput	80	Gunupur (ST)	Bhagirathi Gomango	Indian National Congress (R)	
Koraput	81	Bissam-cuttack (ST)	Dambarudhar Ulaka	Indian National Congress (R)	
Koraput	82	Rayagada (ST)	Ulaka Ramachandra	Indian National Congress (R)	
Koraput	83	Lakshmipur (ST)	Akhili Saunta	Janata Party	
Koraput	84	Pottangi (ST)	Jayaram Pangi	Janata Party	
Koraput	85	Koraput	Harish Chandra Buxipatra	Janata Party	
Koraput	86	Malkangiri (SC)	Naka Kannaya	Janata Party	
Koraput	87	Chitrakonda (ST)	Prahalad Dora	Janata Party	
Koraput	88	Kotpad (ST)	Basudev Majhi	Indian National Congress (R)	
Koraput	89	Jeypore	Raghunath Patnaik	Indian National Congress (R)	
Koraput	90	Nowrangpur	Habibulla Khan	Indian National Congress (R)	
Koraput	91	Kodinga (ST)	Domburu Majhi	Indian National Congress (R)	
Koraput	92	Dabugam (ST)	Shyamoghono Majhi	Janata Party	
Koraput	93	Umarkote (ST)	Rabisingh Majhi	Janata Party	
Kalahandi	94	Nawapara	Ghasiram Majhi	Janata Party	
Kalahandi	95	Khariar	Kapil Narayan Tiwari	Independent	
Kalahandi	96	Dharamgarh (SC)	Gajanan Nayak	Indian National Congress (R)	
Kalahandi	97	Koksara	Rasa Behari Behera	Indian National Congress (R)	
Kalahandi	98	Junagarh	Maheshwar Barad	Indian National Congress (R)	
Kalahandi	99	Bhawanipatna (SC)	Dayanidhi Nayak	Indian National Congress (R)	
Kalahandi	100	Narla (ST)	Tejraj Majhi	Indian National Congress (R)	
Kalahandi	101	Kesinga	Nagendranath Choudhury	Janata Party	
Phulabani	102	Balliguda (ST)	Sadananda Konhor	Independent	
Phulabani	103	Udayagiri (ST)	Ranjit Kumar Pradhan	Janata Party	
Phulabani	104	Phulbani (SC)	Prahallad Behera	Janata Party	
Phulabani	105	Boudh	Natabar Pradhan	Janata Party	
Balangir	106	Titilagarh (SC)	Lalit Mohan Gandhi	Indian National Congress (R)	
Balangir	107	Kantabanji	Prasanna Kumar Pal	Indian National Congress (R)	
Balangir	108	Patnagarh	Bibekananda Meher	Janata Party	
Balangir	109	Saintala	Subash Chandra Bag	Janata Party	
Balangir	110	Loisingha	Ram Prasad Misra	Janata Party	
Balangir	111	Bolangir	Muralidhar Guru	Janata Party	
Balangir	112	Sonepur (SC)	Debaraj Seth	Janata Party	
Balangir	113	Binka	Parakhita Karana	Independent	
Balangir	114	Birmaharajpur	Surendra Pradhan	Janata Party	
Dhenkanal	115	Athmallik	Balakrushna Pattanayak	Janata Party	
Dhenkanal	116	Angul	Adwait Prasad Singh	Janata Party	
Dhenkanal	117	Hindol (SC)	Trinath Naik	Janata Party	
Dhenkanal	118	Dhenkanal	Nandini Satpathy	Janata Party	
Dhenkanal	119	Gondia	Haldnar Misra	Janata Party	
Dhenkanal	120	Kamakhyanagar	Prasanna Kumar Pattnayak	Janata Party	
Dhenkanal	121	Pallahara	Dharanidhar Pradhan	Independent	
Dhenkanal	122	Talcher (SC)	Brundaban Behera	Janata Party	
Sambalpur	123	Padampur	Bir Bikramaditya Singh Bariha	Janata Party	
Sambalpur	124	Melchhamunda	Birendra Kumar Sahoo	Janata Party	
Sambalpur	125	Bijepur	Nityananda Gartia	Janata Party	
Sambalpur	126	Bhatli (SC)	Bimbadhar Kuanr	Janata Party	
Sambalpur	127	Bargarh	Nabin Kumar Pradhan	Janata Party	
Sambalpur	128	Sambalpur	Jhasketan Sahoo	Janata Party	
Sambalpur	129	Brajarajnagar	Upendra Diksit	Indian National Congress (R)	
Sambalpur	130	Jharsuguda	Sairindra Nayak	Indian National Congress (R)	
Sambalpur	131	Laikera (ST)	Rameshwar Singh Naik	Janata Party	
Sambalpur	132	Kuchinda (ST)	Jagateswar Mirdha	Indian National Congress (R)	
Sambalpur	133	Rairakhol (SC)	Basanta Kumar Mahananda	Janata Party	
Sambalpur	134	Deogarh	Bhanu Ganga Tribhuban Deb	Janata Party	
Sundergarh	135	Sundargarh	Kishore Chandra Patel	Indian National Congress (R)	
Sundergarh	136	Talsara (ST)	Ignace Majhi	Janata Party	
Sundergarh	137	Rajgangpur (ST)	Brajamohan Kishan\	Janata Party	
Sundergarh	138	Biramitrapur (ST)	Prem Chand Bhagat	Janata Party	
Sundergarh	139	Rourkela	Braja Kishore Mohanty	Janata Party	
Sundergarh	140	Raghunathpali (ST)	Rabi Dehuri	Janata Party	
Sundergarh	141	Bonai (ST)	Hemanta Kumar Singh Dandpat	Janata Party	
Keonjhar	142	Champua (ST)	Saharai Oram	Janata Party	
Keonjhar	143	Patna	Maheswar Majhi	Janata Party	
Keonjhar	144	Keonjhar (ST)	Kumar Majhi	Janata Party	
Keonjhar	145	Telkoi (ST)	Niladri Naik	Janata Party	
Keonjhar	146	Ramchandrapur	Khirod Prasad Swain	Janata Party	
Keonjhar	147	Anandapur (SC)	Makar Sethi	Janata Party	

== Bypolls ==
No Bypolls were held.
