= Second Biju Patnaik ministry =

Government of Odisha (1990 – 1995)

- 21st Ministry of Orissa
- 1990 – 1995
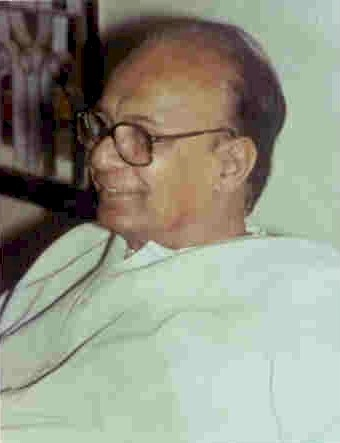
- Biju Patnaik; Hon'ble Chief Minister of Orissa
- Date formed: 5 March 1990
- Date dissolved: 15 March 1995

People and organisations
- Governor: Yagya Dutt Sharma; Saiyid Nurul Hasan (Acting); B. Satya Narayan Reddy
- Chief Minister: Biju Patnaik
- No. of ministers: 25
- Member parties: Janata Dal
- Status in legislature: Majority
- Opposition party: No Official Opposition (Note: No party was able to secure 10% of the assembly strength i.e. 14 Seats)

History
- Incoming formation: 10th Orissa Legislative Assembly
- Outgoing formation: 9th Orissa Legislative Assembly
- Election: 1990 Assembly election
- Legislature terms: 5 years, 10 days
- Predecessor: First Hemananda Biswal ministry
- Successor: Third Janaki Ballabh Patnaik ministry

Biju Patnaik was elected as the chief minister of Orissa for second time in 1990 after Janata Dal secured a landslide victory in the 1990 Orissa Legislative Assembly election. The elections were held in February 1990. JD secured 123 seats out of 147 in the tenth Orissa Legislative Assembly.

== Brief history ==
The Congress Party which was in power from 1980 to 1990 had lost the confidence of the people because of continuous intra-party squabbles and allegation of corruption.

Chief Minister Biju Patnaik along with 9 Cabinet Ministers, 5 Minister of State and 1 Deputy Minister were administered the oath of office and secrecy by Governor Yagya Dutt Sharma on 15 March 1990.

Further cabinet was expanded/reshuffled in 24 July 1990, 1 January 1991, 4 December 1991 and 4 January 1993.

Shri Patnaik resigned on 15 March 1995 following his party's defeat in 1995 Orissa Legislative Assembly election.

== Council of Ministers ==
Source
Portfolio	Portrait	Name Constituency	Tenure		Party
Chief Minister; General Administration; Other departments not allocated to any Minister.		Biju Patnaik; MLA from Bhubaneswar	15 March 1990	15 March 1995	JD
Power; Mines & Geology; Community Development & Rural Reconstruction; Tourism; Sports & Culture; Youth Services; Information & Public Relations; Commerce and Transport; Food & Civil Supplies		Biju Patnaik; MLA from Bhubaneswar	15 March 1990	24 July 1990	JD
Planning & Coordination; Science & Technology; Industries; Harijan & Tribal Welfare; Labour & Employment; Fisheries & Animal Husbandry		Biju Patnaik; MLA from Bhubaneswar	15 March 1990	1 January 1991	JD
Home		Biju Patnaik; MLA from Bhubaneswar	15 March 1990	4 January 1993	JD
Steel & Mines		Biju Patnaik; MLA from Bhubaneswar	24 July 1990	15 March 1995	JD
Energy; Finance; Public Grievances & Pension		Biju Patnaik; MLA from Bhubaneswar	24 July 1990	1 January 1991	JD
Science & Technology		Biju Patnaik; MLA from Bhubaneswar	1 January 1991	15 March 1995	JD
Aviation in Commerce and Transport		Biju Patnaik; MLA from Bhubaneswar	4 December 1991	15 March 1995	JD
Environment		Biju Patnaik; MLA from Bhubaneswar	4 December 1991	4 January 1993	JD
Home (except Jails); Handlooms & Textiles; Public Enterprises; Planning & Coordination		Biju Patnaik; MLA from Bhubaneswar	4 January 1993	15 March 1995	JD
Cabinet Minister
Works; Housing & Urban Development		Nalinikanta Mohanty; MLA from Rajanagar	15 March 1990	15 March 1995	JD
Law		Narasingha Mishra; MLA from Loisingha	15 March 1990	15 March 1995	JD
Forest; Environment		Adwait Prasad Singh; MLA from Angul	15 March 1990	1 January 1991	JD
Forest & Environment		Harish Chandra Buxipatra; MLA from Koraput	1 January 1991	4 December 1991	JD
Forest		Harish Chandra Buxipatra; MLA from Koraput	4 December 1991	4 January 1993	JD
Forest		Adwait Prasad Singh; MLA from Angul	4 January 1993	15 March 1995	JD
Irrigation; Parliamentary Affairs		Bijoy Mohapatra; MLA from Patkura	15 March 1990	15 March 1995	JD
Education in Education & Youth Services		Chaitanya Prasad Majhi; MLA from Rairangpur	15 March 1990	1 January 1991	JD
Education		Chaitanya Prasad Majhi; MLA from Rairangpur	1 January 1991	4 January 1993	JD
Higher Education in Education		Chaitanya Prasad Majhi; MLA from Rairangpur	4 January 1993	15 March 1995	JD
Health & Family Welfare		Ghasiram Majhi; MLA from Nawapara	15 March 1990	1 January 1991	JD
Health & Family Welfare		Bairagi Jena; MLA from Chandabali	1 January 1991	4 January 1993	JD
Health		Sayed Mustafiz Ahmed; MLA from Cuttack City	4 January 1993	15 March 1995	JD
Agriculture		Jagannath Mallick; MLA from Jajpur	15 March 1990	4 January 1993	JD
Agriculture		Ram Krushna Patnaik; MLA from Kodala	4 January 1993	15 March 1995	JD
Co-operation		Jagannath Mallick; MLA from Jajpur	15 March 1990	1 January 1991	JD
Co-operation		Adwait Prasad Singh; MLA from Angul	1 January 1991	4 January 1993	JD
Co-operation		Biswabhusan Harichandan; MLA from Chilika	4 January 1993	15 March 1995	JD
Finance		Ram Krushna Patnaik; MLA from Kodala	15 March 1990	24 July 1990	JD
Finance		Bed Prakash Agarwal; MLA from Kendrapara	1 January 1991	15 March 1995	JD
Revenue		Surendra Nath Naik; MLA from Kakatpur	15 March 1990	15 March 1995	JD
Excise		Surendra Nath Naik; MLA from Kakatpur	15 March 1990	1 January 1991	JD
Excise		Prasanna Acharya; MLA from Bargarh	1 January 1991	4 January 1993	JD
Rural Development		Ram Krushna Patnaik; MLA from Kodala	24 July 1990	4 January 1993	JD
Rural Development (except Lift Irrigation & Minor Irrigation)		Prasanna Acharya; MLA from Bargarh	4 January 1993	15 March 1995	JD
Lift Irrigation & Minor Irrigation		Saharai Oram; MLA from Champua	4 January 1993	15 March 1995	JD
Industries (except Handlooms & Textiles)		Dilip Kumar Ray; MLA from Rourkela	1 January 1991	15 March 1995	JD
Harijan & Tribal Welfare		Ghasiram Majhi; MLA from Nawapara	1 January 1991	4 January 1993	JD
Tribal Welfare		Ghasiram Majhi; MLA from Nawapara	4 January 1993	15 March 1995	JD
Harijan Welfare		Jagannath Mallick; MLA from Jajpur	4 January 1993	15 March 1995	JD
Handlooms & Textiles Industries		Sayed Mustafiz Ahmed; MLA from Cuttack City	1 January 1991	4 January 1993	JD
Sports & Culture; Youth Services		Sarat Kumar Kar; MLA from Mahanga	1 January 1991	15 March 1995	JD
Information & Public Relations		Sarat Kumar Kar; MLA from Mahanga	1 January 1991	4 January 1993	JD
Information & Public Relations		Bairagi Jena; MLA from Chandabali	4 January 1993	15 March 1995	JD
Tourism		Ananga Udaya Singh Deo; MLA from Bolangir	1 January 1991	15 March 1995	JD
Commerce and Transport		Bhagabat Behera; MLA from Nayagarh	24 July 1990	4 December 1991	JD
Commerce and Transport (except Aviation)		Bhagabat Behera; MLA from Nayagarh	4 December 1991	4 January 1993	JD
Commerce and Transport (except Aviation)		Harish Chandra Buxipatra; MLA from Koraput	4 January 1993	15 March 1995	JD
Food & Civil Supplies		Biswabhusan Harichandan; MLA from Chilika	24 July 1990	4 January 1993	JD
Food & Civil Supplies		Bhagabat Behera; MLA from Nayagarh	4 January 1993	15 March 1995	JD
Panchayati Raj		Damodar Rout; MLA from Ersama	24 July 1990	4 January 1993	JD
Panchayati Raj (except Social Welfare)		Damodar Rout; MLA from Ersama	4 January 1993	15 March 1995	JD
Public Grievances & Pension		Prasanna Kumar Patasani; MLA from Khurda	1 January 1991	15 March 1995	JD
School & Mass Education		Prafulla Chandra Ghadei; MLA from Sukinda	4 January 1993	15 March 1995	JD
Energy		Kalindi Behera; MLA from Salepur	4 January 1993	15 March 1995	JD
Minister of State with Independent Charges
Planning & Coordination; Public Enterprises		Prafulla Chandra Ghadei; MLA from Sukinda	7 January 1991	4 January 1993	JD
Rural Electrification		Kalindi Behera; MLA from Salepur	7 January 1991	4 January 1993	JD
Labour & Employment		Prafulla Samal; MLA from Bhadrak	7 January 1991	15 March 1995	JD
Fisheries & Animal Husbandry		Surjya Narayan Patro; MLA from Mohana	7 January 1991	15 March 1995	JD
Family Welfare		Kamala Das; MLA from Bhograi	4 January 1993	15 March 1995	JD
Excise		Jayaram Pangi; MLA from Pottangi	4 January 1993	15 March 1995	JD
Social Welfare		Padmanabha Behera; MLA from Phulbani	4 January 1993	15 March 1995	JD
Handicraft & Cottage Industries		Chhotaray Majhi; MLA from Keonjhar	4 January 1993	15 March 1995	JD
Environment		Mangala Kisan; MLA from Rajgangpur	4 January 1993	15 March 1995	JD
Jails		Kiran Chandra Singh Deo; MLA from Kesinga	4 January 1993	15 March 1995	JD
Minister of State
Harijan & Tribal Welfare		Chhotaray Majhi; MLA from Keonjhar	15 March 1990	4 January 1993	JD
Rural Development		Saharai Oram; MLA from Champua	15 March 1990	4 January 1993	JD
Primary & Adult Education		Kamala Das; MLA from Bhograi	15 March 1990	4 January 1993	JD
Health & Family Welfare		Kamala Das; MLA from Bhograi	4 January 1993	15 March 1995	JD
Forest; Environment		Mangala Kisan; MLA from Rajgangpur	15 March 1990	1 January 1991	JD
Forest & Environment		Mangala Kisan; MLA from Rajgangpur	1 January 1991	15 March 1995	JD
Industries		Dilip Kumar Ray; MLA from Rourkela	15 March 1990	1 January 1991	JD
Industries		Jadav Majhi; MLA from Dabugam	1 January 1991	15 March 1995	JD
Health & Family Welfare		Sayed Mustafiz Ahmed; MLA from Cuttack City	15 March 1990	1 January 1991	JD
Health & Family Welfare		Trinath Naik; MLA from Hindol	1 January 1991	17 October 1992	JD
Planning & Coordination		Jadav Majhi; MLA from Dabugam	15 March 1990	1 January 1991	JD
Fisheries & Animal Husbandry		Surjya Narayan Patro; MLA from Mohana	15 March 1990	1 January 1991	JD
Labour & Employment		Prafulla Samal; MLA from Bhadrak	15 March 1990	1 January 1991	JD
Handlooms & Textiles		Prasanna Acharya; MLA from Bargarh	15 March 1990	1 January 1991	JD
Co-operation		Jayaram Pangi; MLA from Pottangi	25 July 1990	4 January 1993	JD
Agriculture		Jayaram Pangi; MLA from Pottangi	25 July 1990	1 January 1991	JD
Panchayati Raj		Padmanabha Behera; MLA from Phulbani	1 January 1991	15 March 1995	JD
Irrigation		Raghunath Hembram; MLA from Karanjia	1 January 1991	15 March 1995	JD
Works; Housing & Urban Development		Kiran Chandra Singh Deo; MLA from Kesinga	1 January 1991	4 January 1993	JD
Deputy Minister
Tourism; Sports & Culture		Padmanabha Behera; MLA from Phulbani	15 March 1990	1 January 1991	JD

== Demographics ==
Division	District	Ministers	Cabinet Ministers	Ministers of State
Northern	Angul	1	Adwait Prasad Singh	–
Northern	Balangir	2	Narasingha Mishra; Ananga Udaya Singh Deo	–
Northern	Bargarh	1	Prasanna Acharya	–
Northern	Dhenkanal	1	–	Trinath Naik
Northern	Deogarh	0	–	–
Northern	Jharsuguda	0	–	–
Northern	Keonjhar	2	Saharai Oram	Chhotaray Majhi
Northern	Subarnapur	0	–	–
Northern	Sambalpur	0	–	–
Northern	Sundergarh	2	Dilip Kumar Ray	Mangala Kisan
Central	Balasore	1	–	Kamala Das
Central	Bhadrak	2	Bairagi Jena	Prafulla Samal
Central	Cuttack	3	Sayed Mustafiz Ahmed; Sarat Kumar Kar; Kalindi Behera	–
Central	Jagatsinghpur	2	Damodar Rout	–
Central	Jajpur	2	Jagannath Mallick; Prafulla Chandra Ghadei	–
Central	Khorda	3	Biju Patnaik (Chief Minister); Biswabhusan Harichandan; Prasanna Kumar Patasani	–
Central	Kendrapara	3	Nalinikanta Mohanty; Bed Prakash Agarwal; Bijoy Mohapatra	–
Central	Mayurbhanj	2	Chaitanya Prasad Majhi	Raghunath Hembram
Central	Nayagarh	1	Bhagabat Behera	–
Central	Puri	1	Surendra Nath Naik	–
Southern	Boudh	0	–	–
Southern	Gajapati	0	–	–
Southern	Ganjam	2	Ram Krushna Patnaik	Surjya Narayan Patro
Southern	Kalahandi	1	–	Kiran Chandra Singh Deo
Southern	Kandhamal	1	–	Padmanabha Behera
Southern	Koraput	2	Harish Chandra Buxipatra	Jayaram Pangi
Southern	Malkangiri	0	–	–
Southern	Nabarangpur	1	–	Jadav Majhi
Southern	Nuapada	1	Ghasiram Majhi	–
Southern	Rayagada	0	–	–
