= 1977 Orissa Legislative Assembly election =

1977 Assembly election in Orissa

- June 10, 1977

All 147 seats in the Orissa Legislative Assembly 74 seats needed for a majority
- Registered: 1,26,39,382 (▲7.19%)
- Turnout: 41.79% (▼9.91pp)
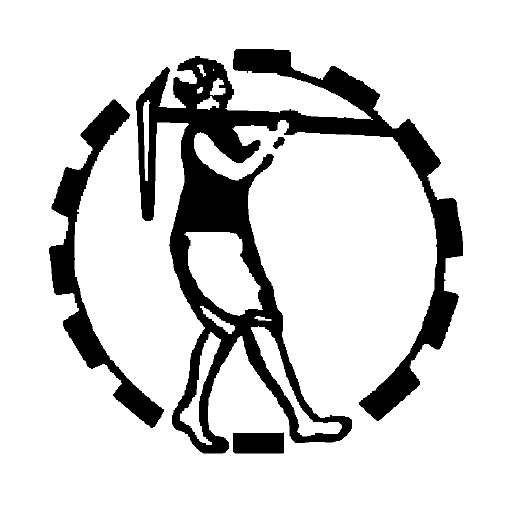

	Majority party	Minority party
Leader	Nilamani Routray	Binayak Acharya
Party	JP	INC
Leader's seat	Basudebapur(won)	Bolangir(lost)
Seats won	110	26
Seat change	New	▼43
Popular vote	25,27,787	15,94,505
Percentage	49.2%	31.00
CM before election
Vacant
President's rule
Elected CM
Nilamani Routray
Janata Party

Elections to the seventh Orissa Legislative Assembly were held 1977.

== Constituencies ==
The elections were held for 147 seats. A total of 604 candidates contested for these 147 seats.

== Political Parties ==
In 1974, Utkal Congress merged into Bharatiya Lok Dal to form Orissa Janata Party. Orissa Janata Party which also included Indian National Congress (O) – where "O" stood for "Organisation" or "Old" along with Samyukta Socialist Party and the Bharatiya Jana Sangh came together to form Janata Party to oppose Indira Gandhi and the Congress (R).

Three national parties, Communist Party of India, Indian National Congress, and Janata Party took part in the assembly election.

== Results ==
Source: Election Commission of India
Party			Popular vote			Seats		
Flag	Name	Symbol	Votes	%	±pp	Contested	Won	+/−
	Janata Party		2,527,787	49.17	New entry	147	110	New entry
	Indian National Congress		1,594,505	31.02	▼6.42	146	26	▼43
	Communist Party of India		183,485	3.57	▼1.3	25	1	▼6
	Communist Party of India (Marxist)		45,219	0.88	▼0.3	4	1	▼3
-	Independents	-	738,545	14.37	▼1.38	264	9	▼2
Total			-	100	-	-	147	-
Valid Votes			5,140,549	40.67				
Invalid Votes			140,861	-				
Total Votes polled / turnout			5,281,410	41.79				
Abstentation			7,357,972	-				
Total No. of Electors			12,639,382					

== Elected members ==
District	AC. No.	Constituency	Winner Candidate	Party
Mayurbhanj	1	Karanjia (ST)	Raghunath Hemram	Janata Party
Mayurbhanj	2	Jashipur (ST)	Kanhuram Hembram	Janata Party
Mayurbhanj	3	Bahalda (ST)	Sunaram Soren	Janata Party
Mayurbhanj	4	Rairangpur (ST)	Arjun Majhi	Janata Party
Mayurbhanj	5	Bangriposi (ST)	Purusottam Naik	Janata Party
Mayurbhanj	6	Kuliana (ST)	Niranjan Hembram	Janata Party
Mayurbhanj	7	Baripada	Prasanna Kumar Dash	Indian National Congress
Mayurbhanj	8	Baisinga (ST)	Ram Chandar Kisku	Janata Party
Mayurbhanj	9	Khunta (ST)	Ramesh Soren	Indian National Congress
Mayurbhanj	10	Udala (ST)	Birabhadra Singh	Janata Party
Baleshwar	11	Bhograi	Sushant Chand	Janata Party
Baleshwar	12	Jaleswar	Gadadhar Giri	Janata Party
Baleshwar	13	Basta	Maheshwar Baug	Janata Party
Baleshwar	14	Balasore	Kartik Chandar Rout	Janata Party
Baleshwar	15	Soro	Haraprasad Mohapatra	Janata Party
Baleshwar	16	Simulia	Gopinath Das	Janata Party
Baleshwar	17	Nilgiri	Rajendra Chandra Mardaraj	Janata Party
Baleshwar	18	Bhandaripokhari (SC)	Kapila Charan Sethi	Janata Party
Baleshwar	19	Bhadrak	Ratnakar Mohanty	Janata Party
Baleshwar	20	Dhamnagar	Hrudananda Mallick	Janata Party
Baleshwar	21	Chandbali (SC)	Gangadhar Das	Janata Party
Baleshwar	22	Basudevpur	Nilamani Routray	Janata Party
Cuttack	23	Sukinda	Ananda Manjari Devi	Janata Party
Cuttack	24	Korai	Ashok Kumar Das	Janata Party
Cuttack	25	Jajpur (SC)	Jaganath Malik	Janata Party
Cuttack	26	Dharamsala	Rabi Das	Janata Party
Cuttack	27	Barchana	Managobinda Samal	Janata Party
Cuttack	28	Bari-Derabisi	Srikant Kumar Jena	Janata Party
Cuttack	29	Binjharpur (SC)	Santanu Kumar Das	Janata Party
Cuttack	30	Aul	Sarat Kumar Deb	Janata Party
Cuttack	31	Patamundai (SC)	Tapas Kumar Das	Janata Party
Cuttack	32	Rajnagar	Nalinikanta Mohanty	Janata Party
Cuttack	33	Kendrapara	Bed Prakash Agrawal	Janata Party
Cuttack	34	Patkura	Prahallad Mallick	Janata Party
Cuttack	35	Tirtol	Pratap Chandra Mohanty	Janata Party
Cuttack	36	Ersama	Damodar Rout	Janata Party
Cuttack	37	Balikuda	Umesh Swain	Janata Party
Cuttack	38	Jagatsinghpur (SC)	Kanduri Charan Mallik	Janata Party
Cuttack	39	Kissannagar	Batakrishna Jena	Janata Party
Cuttack	40	Mahanga	Pradipta Kishore Das	Janata Party
Cuttack	41	Salepur (SC)	Kalindi Charan Behera	Janata Party
Cuttack	42	Gobindpur	Panchanan Kanungo	Janata Party
Cuttack	43	Cuttack Sadar	Sangram Keshari Mohapatra	Janata Party
Cuttack	44	Cuttack City	Biswanath Pandit	Janata Party
Cuttack	45	Choudwar	Rajkishore Ram	Janata Party
Cuttack	46	Banki	Jogesh Chandra Rout	Indian National Congress
Cuttack	47	Athgarh	Rasmanjari Devi	Janata Party
Cuttack	48	Baramba	Trilochan Singh Deo	Independent
Puri	49	Balipatna (SC)	Gopinath Bhoi	Janata Party
Puri	50	Bhubaneswar	Satyapriya Mohanty	Janata Party
Puri	51	Jatni	Suresh Kumar Routray	Janata Party
Puri	52	Pipli	Kiran Lekha Mohanty	Janata Party
Puri	53	Nimapara (SC)	Govinda Chandra Sethi	Janata Party
Puri	54	Kakatpur	Surendra Nath Naik	Janata Party
Puri	55	Satyabadi	Chandra Madhab Misra	Janata Party
Puri	56	Puri	Braja Kishore Tripathy	Janata Party
Puri	57	Brahmagiri	Ajay Kumar Jena	Janata Party
Puri	58	Chilka	Biswabhusan Harichandan	Janata Party
Puri	59	Khurda	Sudarsan Mohanty	Janata Party
Puri	60	Begunia	Chintamani Panigrahi	Indian National Congress
Puri	61	Ranpur	Ramesh Chandra Panda	Communist Party of India (Marxist)
Puri	62	Nayagarh	Bhagabat Behera	Janata Party
Puri	63	Khandapara	Satyasundar Mishra	Independent
Puri	64	Daspalla	Harihar Karan	Indian National Congress
Ganjam	65	Jaganathprasad (SC)	Udayanath Naik	Janata Party
Ganjam	66	Bhanjanagar	Jami Subba Rao Prusty	Janata Party
Ganjam	67	Suruda	Ananta Narayan Singh Deo	Janata Party
Ganjam	68	Aska	Harihar Swain	Janata Party
Ganjam	69	Kabisuryanagar	Tarini Patnaik	Janata Party
Ganjam	70	Kodala	Ram Krushna Patnaik	Janata Party
Ganjam	71	Khallikote	V. Sugnana Kumari Deo	Janata Party
Ganjam	72	Chatrapur	Biswanath Sahu	Communist Party of India
Ganjam	73	Hinjili	Brundaban Nayak	Indian National Congress
Ganjam	74	Gopalpur (SC)	Ghansyam Behera	Indian National Congress
Ganjam	75	Berhampur	Ratna Manjari Devi	Independent
Ganjam	76	Chikiti	Jagannath Pati	Janata Party
Ganjam	77	Mohana	Udaya Narayan Devi	Independent
Ganjam	78	Ramagiri (ST)	Gorosang Savara	Indian National Congress
Ganjam	79	Parlakhemundi	Bijaya Kumar Jena	Independent
Koraput	80	Gunupur (ST)	Bhagirathi Gomango	Indian National Congress
Koraput	81	Bissam-cuttack (ST)	Dambarudhar Ulaka	Indian National Congress
Koraput	82	Rayagada (ST)	Ulaka Ramachandra	Indian National Congress
Koraput	83	Lakshmipur (ST)	Akhili Saunta	Janata Party
Koraput	84	Pottangi (ST)	Jayaram Pangi	Janata Party
Koraput	85	Koraput	Harish Chandra Buxipatra	Janata Party
Koraput	86	Malkangiri (SC)	Naka Kannaya	Janata Party
Koraput	87	Chitrakonda (ST)	Prahalad Dora	Janata Party
Koraput	88	Kotpad (ST)	Basudev Majhi	Indian National Congress
Koraput	89	Jeypore	Raghunath Patnaik	Indian National Congress
Koraput	90	Nowrangpur	Habibulla Khan	Indian National Congress
Koraput	91	Kodinga (ST)	Domburu Majhi	Indian National Congress
Koraput	92	Dabugam (ST)	Shyamoghono Majhi	Janata Party
Koraput	93	Umarkote (ST)	Rabisingh Majhi	Janata Party
Kalahandi	94	Nawapara	Ghasiram Majhi	Janata Party
Kalahandi	95	Khariar	Kapil Narayan Tiwari	Independent
Kalahandi	96	Dharamgarh (SC)	Gajanan Nayak	Indian National Congress
Kalahandi	97	Koksara	Rasa Behari Behera	Indian National Congress
Kalahandi	98	Junagarh	Maheshwar Barad	Indian National Congress
Kalahandi	99	Bhawanipatna (SC)	Dayanidhi Nayak	Indian National Congress
Kalahandi	100	Narla (ST)	Tejraj Majhi	Indian National Congress
Kalahandi	101	Kesinga	Nagendranath Choudhury	Janata Party
Phulabani	102	Balliguda (ST)	Sadananda Konhor	Independent
Phulabani	103	Udayagiri (ST)	Ranjit Kumar Pradhan	Janata Party
Phulabani	104	Phulbani (SC)	Prahallad Behera	Janata Party
Phulabani	105	Boudh	Natabar Pradhan	Janata Party
Balangir	106	Titilagarh (SC)	Lalit Mohan Gandhi	Indian National Congress
Balangir	107	Kantabanji	Prasanna Kumar Pal	Indian National Congress
Balangir	108	Patnagarh	Bibekananda Meher	Janata Party
Balangir	109	Saintala	Subash Chandra Bag	Janata Party
Balangir	110	Loisingha	Ram Prasad Misra	Janata Party
Balangir	111	Bolangir	Muralidhar Guru	Janata Party
Balangir	112	Sonepur (SC)	Debaraj Seth	Janata Party
Balangir	113	Binka	Parakhita Karana	Independent
Balangir	114	Birmaharajpur	Surendra Pradhan	Janata Party
Dhenkanal	115	Athmallik	Balakrushna Pattanayak	Janata Party
Dhenkanal	116	Angul	Adwait Prasad Singh	Janata Party
Dhenkanal	117	Hindol (SC)	Trinath Naik	Janata Party
Dhenkanal	118	Dhenkanal	Nandini Satpathy	Janata Party
Dhenkanal	119	Gondia	Haldnar Misra	Janata Party
Dhenkanal	120	Kamakhyanagar	Prasanna Kumar Pattnayak	Janata Party
Dhenkanal	121	Pallahara	Dharanidhar Pradhan	Independent
Dhenkanal	122	Talcher (SC)	Brundaban Behera	Janata Party
Sambalpur	123	Padampur	Bir Bikramaditya Singh Bariha	Janata Party
Sambalpur	124	Melchhamunda	Birendra Kumar Sahoo	Janata Party
Sambalpur	125	Bijepur	Nityananda Gartia	Janata Party
Sambalpur	126	Bhatli (SC)	Bimbadhar Kuanr	Janata Party
Sambalpur	127	Bargarh	Nabin Kumar Pradhan	Janata Party
Sambalpur	128	Sambalpur	Jhasketan Sahoo	Janata Party
Sambalpur	129	Brajarajnagar	Upendra Diksit	Indian National Congress
Sambalpur	130	Jharsuguda	Sairindra Nayak	Indian National Congress
Sambalpur	131	Laikera (ST)	Rameshwar Singh Naik	Janata Party
Sambalpur	132	Kuchinda (ST)	Jagateswar Mirdha	Indian National Congress
Sambalpur	133	Rairakhol (SC)	Basanta Kumar Mahananda	Janata Party
Sambalpur	134	Deogarh	Bhanu Ganga Tribhuban Deb	Janata Party
Sundergarh	135	Sundargarh	Kishore Chandra Patel	Indian National Congress
Sundergarh	136	Talsara (ST)	Ignace Majhi	Janata Party
Sundergarh	137	Rajgangpur (ST)	Brajamohan Kishan	Janata Party
Sundergarh	138	Biramitrapur (ST)	Prem Chand Bhagat	Janata Party
Sundergarh	139	Rourkela	Braja Kishore Mohanty	Janata Party
Sundergarh	140	Raghunathpali (ST)	Rabi Dehuri	Janata Party
Sundergarh	141	Bonai (ST)	Hemanta Kumar Singh Dandpat	Janata Party
Keonjhar	142	Champua (ST)	Saharai Oram	Janata Party
Keonjhar	143	Patna	Maheswar Majhi	Janata Party
Keonjhar	144	Keonjhar (ST)	Kumar Majhi	Janata Party
Keonjhar	145	Telkoi (ST)	Niladri Naik	Janata Party
Keonjhar	146	Ramchandrapur	Khirod Prasad Swain	Janata Party
Keonjhar	147	Anandapur (SC)	Makar Sethi	Janata Party

== Government Formation ==
The Janata Party emerged again as the winner by winning 78% of the seats with a vote share of 49%. Nilamani Routray become the Chief Minister of the state.

== See also ==
- 1977 elections in India
- 1974 Orissa Legislative Assembly election
- 1980 Orissa Legislative Assembly election
