= Speaker of the Odisha Legislative Assembly =

Presiding officer of Odisha legislative assembly

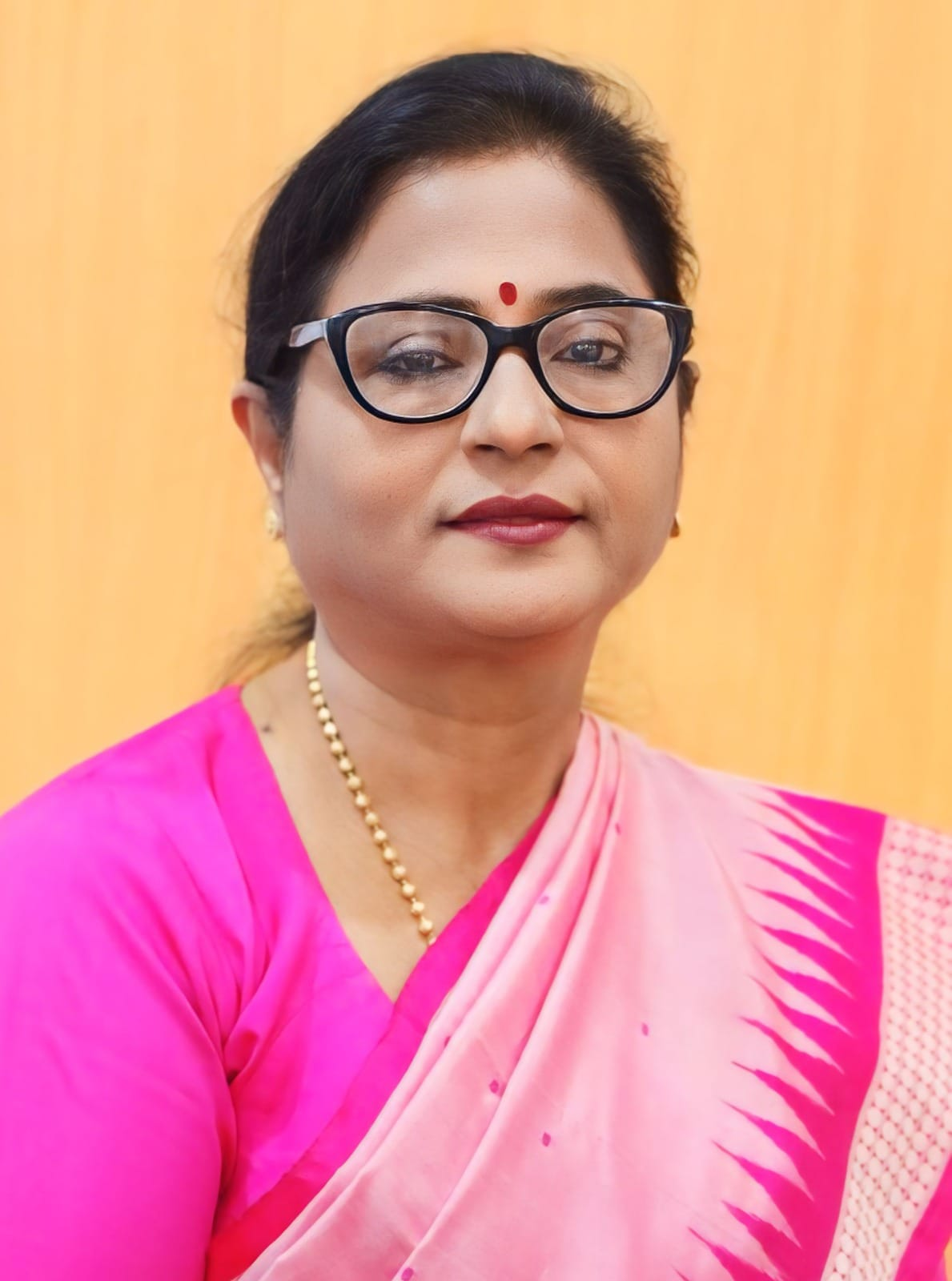
- Incumbent; Surama Padhy since 20 June 2024
- Odisha Legislative Assembly
- Style: Honourable Speaker Sir/Madam
- Member of: Odisha Legislative Assembly
- Residence: Residence of the Speaker, Bhubaneswar
- Seat: Office of the Speaker, Odisha Legislative Assembly
- Appointer: Members of the Odisha Legislative Assembly
- Term length: Duration of the Assembly i.e. 5 years
- Inaugural holder: Mukunda Prasad Das
- Deputy: Bhabani Shankar Bhoi
- Salary: ₹97,500 (US$1,000)/monthly; ₹1,170,000 (US$12,000)/annually

The Speaker of the Odisha Legislative Assembly is the presiding officer of the Legislative Assembly of Odisha, the main law-making body for the Indian state of Odisha.

In the Republic of India, the various central and state legislatures are presided by either a Speaker or a Chairman. The Speaker is elected in the very first meeting of the Odisha Legislative Assembly after the General elections for a term of 5 years from amongst the members of the Vidhan Sabha. The Speaker holds office until either they ceases to be a member of the Vidhan Sabha or he himself resigns. The Speaker can be removed from office by a resolution passed in the Vidhan Sabha by an effective majority of its members. In the absence of a Speaker, the meeting of Odisha Legislative Assembly is presided over by the Deputy Speaker.

== List of speakers ==
Speakers of the Odisha Legislative Assembly
| No. | Portrait | Name (Birth–Death) Constituency | Term of office | | | Chief Minister(s) | Assembly (Election) | Party |
|---|---|---|---|---|---|---|---|---|
| 1 | | Mukunda Prasad Das (1887–1969); Central Balasore Sadar | 28 July 1937 | 29 May 1946 | 8 years, 305 days | Krushna Chandra Gajapati; Bishwanath Das; Krushna Chandra Gajapati | 1st Provincial (1937) | Indian National Congress |
| 2 | | Lal Mohan Patnaik (1891–1956); Indian Christian | 29 May 1946 | 6 March 1952 | 5 years, 282 days | Harekrushna Mahatab; Nabakrushna Choudhuri | 2nd Provincial (1946) | Indian National Congress |
| 3 | | Nanda Kishore Das (1907–1986); Soro | 6 March 1952 | 27 May 1957 | 5 years, 82 days | Nabakrushna Choudhuri; Harekrushna Mahatab | 1st (1952) | Indian National Congress |
| 4 | | Nilakantha Das (1884–1967); Satyabadi | 27 May 1957 | 25 February 1961 | 3 years, 274 days | Harekrushna Mahatab | 2nd (1957) | Indian National Congress |
President's rule (25 February – 23 June 1961)
| 5 | | Lingaraj Panigrahi (1896–1969); Kodala East | 1 July 1961 | 18 March 1967 | 5 years, 260 days | Biju Patnaik; Biren Mitra; Sadashiva Tripathy | 3rd (1961) | Indian National Congress |
| 6 | | Nandakishore Mishra (1906–1992); Loisingha | 18 March 1967 | 11 January 1971 | 3 years, 299 days | Rajendra Narayan Singh Deo | 4th (1967) | Swatantra Party |
President's rule (11 January – 3 April 1971)
| (6) | | Nandakishore Mishra (1906–1992); Loisingha | 12 April 1971 | 3 March 1973 | 1 year, 325 days | Bishwanath Das; Nandini Satpathy | 5th (1971) | Swatantra Party |
President's rule (3 March 1973 – 6 March 1974)
| 7 | | Brajamohan Mohanty (1923–1999); Puri | 21 March 1974 | 16 December 1976 | 2 years, 270 days | Nandini Satpathy | 6th (1974) | Indian National Congress |
President's rule (16 December – 29 December 1976)
| (7) | | Brajamohan Mohanty (1923–1999); Puri | 30 December 1976 | 30 April 1977 | 121 days | Binayak Acharya | 6th (1974) | Indian National Congress |
President's rule (30 April – 26 June 1977)
| 8 | | Satyapriya Mohanty (1905–1999); Bhubaneswar | 1 July 1977 | 17 February 1980 | 2 years, 231 days | Nilamani Routray | 7th (1977) | Janata Party |
President's rule (17 February – 9 June 1980)
| 9 | | Somnath Rath (1924–2013); Bhanjanagar | 12 June 1980 | 11 February 1984 | 3 years, 244 days | Janaki Ballabh Patnaik | 8th (1980) | Indian National Congress |
| 10 | | Prasanna Kumar Dash (1919–2005); Baripada | 22 February 1984 | 14 March 1985 | 1 year, 20 days | Janaki Ballabh Patnaik | 8th (1980) | Indian National Congress |
| 10 | | Prasanna Kumar Dash (1919–2005); Baripada | 14 March 1985 | 9 March 1990 | 4 years, 360 days | Janaki Ballabh Patnaik; Hemananda Biswal | 9th (1985) | Indian National Congress |
| 11 | | Yudhistir Das (1923–2014); Kissannagar | 9 March 1990 | 22 March 1995 | 5 years, 13 days | Biju Patnaik | 10th (1990) | Janata Dal |
| 12 | | Kishore Chandra Patel (born 1946); Sundargarh | 22 March 1995 | 14 January 1996 | 298 days | Janaki Ballabh Patnaik; Giridhar Gamang; Hemananda Biswal | 11th (1995) | Indian National Congress |
| 13 | | Chintamani Dyan Samantra (born 1940); Chikiti | 16 February 1996 | 10 March 2000 | 4 years, 23 days | Janaki Ballabh Patnaik; Giridhar Gamang; Hemananda Biswal | 11th (1995) | Independent |
| 14 | | Sarat Kumar Kar (1939–2020); Mahanga | 10 March 2000 | 21 May 2004 | 4 years, 72 days | Naveen Patnaik | 12th (2000) | Biju Janata Dal |
| 15 | | Maheswar Mohanty (1956–2023); Puri | 21 May 2004 | 31 March 2008 | 3 years, 315 days | Naveen Patnaik | 13th (2004) | Biju Janata Dal |
| 16 | | Prahlad Dora (Acting) (1946–2021); Chitrakonda | 31 March 2008 | 19 August 2008 | 141 days | Naveen Patnaik | 13th (2004) | Bharatiya Janata Party |
| 17 | | Kishore Kumar Mohanty (1958–2021); Jharsuguda | 19 August 2008 | 25 May 2009 | 279 days | Naveen Patnaik | 13th (2004) | Biju Janata Dal |
| 18 | | Pradip Kumar Amat (born 1952); Boudh | 25 May 2009 | 20 May 2014 | 4 years, 360 days | Naveen Patnaik | 14th (2009) | Biju Janata Dal |
| 19 | | Niranjan Pujari (born 1961); Sonepur | 26 May 2014 | 6 May 2017 | 2 years, 345 days | Naveen Patnaik | 15th (2014) | Biju Janata Dal |
| 20 | | Pradip Kumar Amat (born 1952); Boudh | 16 May 2017 | 31 May 2019 | 2 years, 15 days | Naveen Patnaik | 15th (2014) | Biju Janata Dal |
| 21 | | Surjya Narayan Patro (1948–2023); Digapahandi | 1 June 2019 | 4 June 2022 | 3 years, 3 days | Naveen Patnaik | 16th (2019) | Biju Janata Dal |
| 22 | | Bikram Keshari Arukha (born 1962); Bhanjanagar | 13 June 2022 | 12 May 2023 | 333 days | Naveen Patnaik | 16th (2019) | Biju Janata Dal |
| 23 | | Pramila Mallik (born 1963); Binjharpur | 22 September 2023 | 3 June 2024 | 255 days | Naveen Patnaik | 16th (2019) | Biju Janata Dal |
| 24 | | Surama Padhy (born 1960); Ranpur | 20 June 2024 | Incumbent | 2 years, 147 days | Mohan Charan Majhi | 17th (2024) | Bharatiya Janata Party |

== List of deputy speakers ==
Share of time in office for Odisha Deputy Speakers by party (1937–present)
1. Indian National Congress (53.1%)
2. Biju Janata Dal (17.2%)
3. Bharatiya Janata Party (13.0%)
4. Janata Dal (5.91%)
5. Praja Socialist Party (4.49%)
6. Janata Party (3.04%)
7. Utkal Congress (2.17%)
8. Independent (1.04%)

Deputy Speakers of the Odisha Legislative Assembly
| No. | Portrait | Name (Birth–Death) | Constituency | Term of office | | | Assembly (Election) | Party |
|---|---|---|---|---|---|---|---|---|
| 1 | | Nanda Kishore Das (1907–1986) | South Balasore Sadar | 28 July 1937 | 14 September 1945 | 8 years, 48 days | 1st Provincial (1937) | Indian National Congress |
| 2 | | Adruti Laxmibai (1899–1986) | Berhampur Town | 29 May 1946 | 20 February 1952 | 5 years, 267 days | 2nd Provincial (1946) | Indian National Congress |
| 3 | | Mahammed Hanif | Bhadrak | 8 March 1952 | 4 March 1957 | 4 years, 361 days | 1st (1952) | Indian National Congress |
| 4 | | Jadumani Mangaraj (1894–1964) | Barchana | 29 May 1957 | 25 February 1961 | 3 years, 272 days | 2nd (1957) | Indian National Congress |
President's rule (25 February – 23 June 1961)
| 5 | | Lokanath Mishra (1909–1967) | Patkura | 28 August 1961 | 1 March 1967 | 5 years, 185 days | 3rd (1961) | Indian National Congress |
| 6 | | Harihar Bahinipati (1927–2005) | Puri | 29 March 1967 | 11 January 1971 | 3 years, 288 days | 4th (1967) | Praja Socialist Party |
President's rule (11 January – 3 April 1971)
| 7 | | Narayan Birabar Samanta (1900–1999) | Erasama | 6 May 1971 | 3 March 1973 | 1 year, 301 days | 5th (1971) | Utkal Congress |
President's rule (3 March 1973 – 6 March 1974)
| 8 | | Chintamani Jena (1929–2008) | Basta | 29 March 1974 | 30 April 1977 | 3 years, 32 days | 6th (1974) | Indian National Congress |
President's rule (30 April – 26 June 1977)
| 9 | | Surendra Nath Naik (1937–2024) | Kakatpur | 27 July 1977 | 17 February 1980 | 2 years, 205 days | 7th (1977) | Janata Party |
President's rule (17 February – 9 June 1980)
| 10 | | Himansu Sekhar Padhi | Boudh | 2 July 1980 | 9 March 1985 | 4 years, 250 days | 8th (1980) | Indian National Congress |
| 11 | | Chintamani Dyan Samantra (born 1940) | Chikiti | 18 March 1985 | 3 March 1990 | 4 years, 350 days | 9th (1985) | Indian National Congress |
| 12 | | Prahlad Dora (1946–2021) | Chitrakonda | 20 March 1990 | 15 March 1995 | 4 years, 360 days | 10th (1990) | Janata Dal |
| (11) | | Chintamani Dyan Samantra (born 1940) | Chikiti | 28 March 1995 | 12 February 1996 | 321 days | 11th (1995) | Independent |
| 13 | | Bibhuti Bhusan Singh Mardaraj (1955–2025) | Khandapada | 15 March 1996 | 29 February 2000 | 3 years, 351 days | 11th (1995) | Indian National Congress |
| 14 | | Rama Chandra Panda (born 1949) | Chhatrapur | 27 March 2000 | 6 February 2004 | 3 years, 316 days | 12th (2000) | Bharatiya Janata Party |
| (12) | | Prahlad Dora (1946–2021) | Chitrakonda | 3 July 2004 | 19 May 2009 | 4 years, 320 days | 13th (2004) | Bharatiya Janata Party |
| 15 | | Lal Bihari Himirika (born 1948) | Rayagada | 10 June 2009 | 10 May 2011 | 1 year, 334 days | 14th (2009) | Biju Janata Dal |
| 16 | | Sananda Marndi (born 1971) | Baripada | 17 August 2011 | 18 May 2014 | 2 years, 274 days | 14th (2009) | Biju Janata Dal |
| 16 | | Sananda Marndi (born 1971) | Baripada | 16 June 2014 | 29 May 2019 | 4 years, 347 days | 15th (2014) | Biju Janata Dal |
| 17 | | Rajanikant Singh (born 1955) | Angul | 27 June 2019 | 8 November 2023 | 4 years, 134 days | 16th (2019) | Biju Janata Dal |
| 18 | | Saluga Pradhan (born 1959) | G. Udayagiri | 21 November 2023 | 3 June 2024 | 195 days | 16th (2019) | Biju Janata Dal |
| 19 | | Bhabani Shankar Bhoi (born 1980) | Talsara | 24 July 2024 | Incumbent | 2 years, 113 days | 17th (2024) | Bharatiya Janata Party |

== List of Pro tem Speakers ==
| Assembly | Year | Name | Party |
|---|---|---|---|
| 1st Provincial | 1937 | Bichitrananda Das | Independent |
| 2nd Provincial | 1946 | Lakshminarayan Sahu | Indian National Congress |
| 1st | 1952 | Maulabi Mahammed Hanif | Indian National Congress |
| 2nd | 1957 | Nanda Kishore Das | Indian National Congress |
| 3rd | 1961 | Lingaraj Panigrahi | Indian National Congress |
| 4th | 1967 | Harihar Bahinipati | Praja Socialist Party |
| 5th | 1971 | Narayan Birabar Samanta | Utkal Congress |
| 6th | 1974 | Chintamani Jena | Indian National Congress |
| 7th | 1977 | Surendranath Naik | Janata Party |
| 8th | 1980 | Prasanna Kumar Dash | Indian National Congress |
| 9th | 1985 | Shraddhakar Supakar | Indian National Congress |
| 10th | 1990 | Ghasiram Majhi | Janata Dal |
| 11th | 1995 | Ghasiram Majhi | Janata Dal |
| 12th | 2000 | Habibullah Khan | Indian National Congress |
| 13th | 2004 | Habibullah Khan | Indian National Congress |
| 14th | 2009 | V. Sugnana Kumari Deo | Biju Janata Dal |
| 15th | 2014 | V. Sugnana Kumari Deo | Biju Janata Dal |
| 16th | 2019 | Amar Prasad Satpathy | Biju Janata Dal |
| 17th | 2024 | Ranendra Pratap Swain | Biju Janata Dal |

== See also ==
- Government of Odisha
- Governors of Odisha
- Chief Minister of Odisha
- Deputy Chief Ministers of Odisha
- Leader of the Opposition in the Odisha Legislative Assembly
- Odisha Legislative Assembly
- Elections in Odisha
- Politics of Odisha
