= Raghunath Jagadala =

Indian politician

Member of Odisha Legislative Assembly
- Incumbent
- Assumed office 4 June 2024
- Preceded by: Padmanabha Behera
- Constituency: Birmaharajpur

Personal details
- Party: Bharatiya Janata Party
- Profession: Politician

Raghunath Jagadala is an Indian politician. He was elected to the Odisha Legislative Assembly from Birmaharajpur as a member of the Bharatiya Janata Party.
