= Pragati Legislature Party =

- Founded: 1973
- Dissolved: 1974
- Merged into: Bharatiya Lok Dal

The Pragati Legislature Party(Also called Pragati Dal) was a political grouping in the Legislative Assembly of the Indian state Orissa. PLP was formed in 1973 by the Utkal Congress, Swatantra Party and others. The PLP leader Biju Patnaik, was elected as the Leader of the Opposition of the Assembly on 9 February 1973. His tenure as Leader of Opposition lasted until 3 March the same year. On that date President's Rule was introduced in the state.

PLP and its member organizations later merged into Bharatiya Lok Dal in the end of 1974.

== Background ==
Politics in early 70's Orissa was very fluid. The election of 1971 threw a hung assembly. A coalition government was formed by Utkala Congress, Swatantra Party, Jharkhand Party and others. This government under leadership of Bishwanath Das lasted about a year. There were defections and it lost majority. A Congress government headed by Nandini Satpathy came into power by inducting the defectors from Utkal Congress. However the Satpathy government lost majority in six months when the ex-Utkal Congress Members decided to revive Utkal Congress. Satpathy Decided to call an election. On the eve of election Swatantra Party, Utkal Congress and Swadhin Congress decided to form Pragati Legislature Party. PLP staked claim to form government, but the Governor B.D Jatti dissolved the assembly and called for election.

== Organisation ==
PLP was not a political party in a conventional sense. Its different constituents fought elections under different symbols and campaigned under different flags. It was led by 3 stalwarts of Orissa politics, Rajendra Narayan Singh Deo, Biju Patnaik, and Harekrushna Mahatab.

== Electoral performance ==
PLP won 56 seats in the 1974 mid-term elections. Biju Patnaik was elected as leader of opposition.
