= Yudhistir Das =

Indian politician

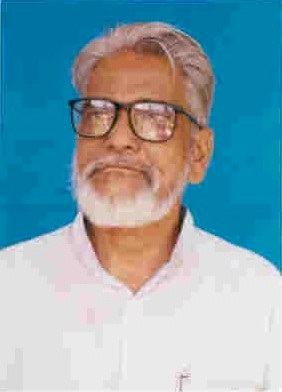

Speaker: 10th Odisha Legislative Assembly
- In office 9 March 1990 – 22 March 1995
- Preceded by: Prasanna Kumar Dash
- Succeeded by: Kishore Chandra Patel
- Constituency: Kissannagar

Member: 10th and 11th Odisha Legislative Assembly
- In office 1990–2000
- Constituency: Kissannagar

Personal details
- Born: 25 September 1923 Nalibar, Cuttack District, Odisha
- Died: 18 February 2014 (aged 90) Bhubaneswar
- Party: Janata Dal
- Other political affiliations: Janata Party, Lok Dal
- Profession: Politician

Yudhistir Das (c. 25 September 1923 – 18 February 2014) was an Indian politician. He was elected to the Odisha Legislative Assembly in the 1990 polls, as a Janata Dal candidate. He served as List of speakers of the Odisha Legislative Assembly speaker of the Odisha Legislative Assembly. As of 2000, he was the president of Viswa Oriya Sammilan (a cultural organisation).
