= Cuttack City Assembly constituency =

Former constituency of the Odisha Legislative Assembly

Cuttack City
- Former constituency for the Odisha Legislative Assembly

Constituency details
- Country: India
- Region: East India
- State: Odisha
- District: Cuttack
- Lok Sabha constituency: Cuttack
- Established: 1951
- Abolished: 2009
- Reservation: None

Cuttack City was an Assembly constituency from Cuttack district of Odisha. It was established in 1951 and abolished in 2008. Following 2008 delimitation, it was subsumed by the Barabati-Cuttack Assembly constituency.

== Members of Legislative Assembly ==
Between 1951 & 2008, 11 elections were held.

List of members elected from Cuttack City constituency are:

Year	Member	Party
1951	Biren Mitra	Indian National Congress
1957	Biren Mitra	Indian National Congress
1961	Biren Mitra	Indian National Congress
1967	Biren Mitra	Indian National Congress
1971	Bhairab Chandra Mohanty	Indian National Congress (R)
1972^	Nandini Satpathy	Indian National Congress
1974	Srikanta Panda	Utkal Congress
1977	Biswanath Pandit	Janata Party
1980	Srikanta Panda	Indian National Congress (I)
1985	Syed Mustafiz Ahmed	Janata Party
1990	Syed Mustafiz Ahmed	Janata Dal
1995	Samir Dey	Bharatiya Janata Party
2000	Samir Dey	Bharatiya Janata Party
2004	Samir Dey	Bharatiya Janata Party
2009 onwards : See Barabati-Cuttack

== Election results ==
=== 2004 ===
2004 Odisha Vidhan Sabha Election, Cuttack City
Party	Candidate	Votes	%	±%
BJP	Samir Dey	58,908	52.72%	
INC	Suresh Mohapatra	48,749	43.63%	
Margin of victory		10,159	9.09%	
Turnout		1,11,720		
BJP hold				

=== 2000 ===
2000 Odisha Vidhan Sabha Election, Cuttack City
Party	Candidate	Votes	%	±%
BJP	Samir Dey	63,819	62.47%	
INC	Syed Mustafiz Ahmed	30,044	29.41%	
Margin of victory		33,775	33.06%	
Turnout		1,02,163		
BJP hold				
