= Bairagi Jena =

Politician from Odisha, India

Member of Parliament, Lok Sabha
- In office 1977–1980
- Preceded by: Arjun Charan Sethi
- Succeeded by: Arjun Charan Sethi
- Constituency: Bhadrak, Odisha

Personal details
- Born: 4 June 1929
- Died: 9 July 2002 (aged 73)
- Party: Janata Party
- Spouse: Sumati Dei

Bairagi Jena was an Indian politician. He was elected to the Lok Sabha, the lower house of the Parliament of India from Bhadrak in Odisha as a member of the Janata Party.
