= Jagannath Mallick =

Indian politician

Odisha Legislative Assembly
- In office 1971–1994
- Constituency: Jajpur

Agriculture & co-operation Minister (Odisha)
- In office 1978–1994

Member of Parliament, Lok Sabha
- In office 1999–2004
- Constituency: Jajpur

Personal details
- Born: 10 July 1937 Mohantypatna, Orissa
- Died: 7 August 2016 (aged 79)
- Party: Pragati Legislature Party, Biju Janata Dal
- Spouse: Kalyani Mallick
- Children: 3

Jagannath Mallick (10 July 1937 – 7 August 2016) was an Indian politician and the member of parliament. He initially served as the member of Odisha Legislative Assembly and the Agriculture and co-operation minister in the state or Odisha.

== Life and background ==
Mallick was born and raised in Mahantypatna, Mangalpur, Jajpur, Orissa. He earned a Bachelor of Arts and higher diploma in cooperative education at Utkal University, Bhubaneswar. He actively participated in social works and authored several books.

== Career ==
Mallick was a member of Odisha Legislative Assembly from 1971 to 1994 and served as cabinet minister from 1978 to 1980 and 1990 to 1994 of the Odisha state when affiliated with Pragati Legislature Party. It was 1999 when he contested first parliamentary elections on Biju Janata Dal's ticket and was elected the parliament member during the thirteenth general elections of India, and remained in office till the term ended.

== Personal life ==
Mallick was married to Kalyani Mallick on 7 July 1957 and had two daughters and one son.

== Death ==
Mallick was suffering from kidney disease and was taken to a private hospital where he remained under medical treatment for some days. However, on 7 April 2016, he died in hospital due to kidney failure and multiple organ dysfunction.
