= Surjya Narayan Patro =

Indian politician (1948–2023)

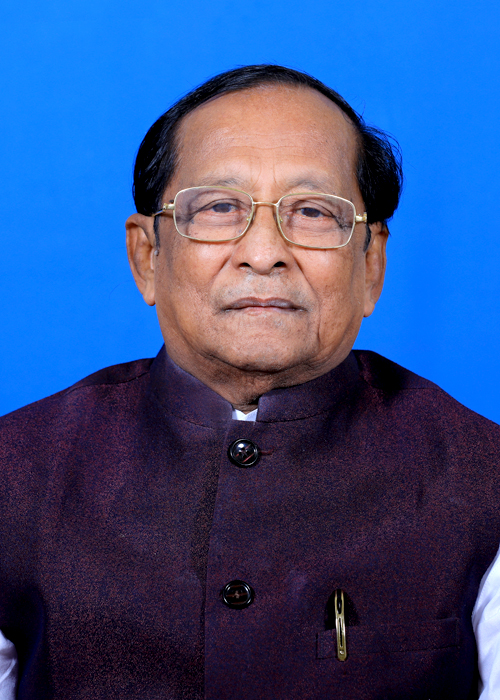

Speaker of the Odisha Legislative Assembly
- In office 1 June 2019 – 4 June 2022
- Preceded by: Pradip Kumar Amat
- Succeeded by: Bikram Keshari Arukha

Member of Odisha Legislative Assembly
- In office 2009–2023
- Constituency: Digapahandi
- In office 1990–2009
- Preceded by: Sarat Kumar Jena
- Succeeded by: Chakradhara Paik
- Constituency: Mohana

Personal details
- Born: 24 December 1948 Berhampur, Odisha, India
- Died: 2 September 2023 (aged 74) Bhubaneshwar, Odisha, India
- Party: Biju Janata Dal
- Occupation: Politician

Surjya Narayan Patro (24 December 1948 – 2 September 2023) was an Indian politician from Biju Janata Dal who served as Speaker of Odisha Legislative Assembly. In June 2022, he resigned from his post.

== Death ==
Patro died on 2 September 2023, at the age of 74.
