= Ratna Manjari Devi =

Indian politician (1935–2019)

Member of the Odisha Legislative Assembly
- In office 1977-1980
- Preceded by: Binayak Acharya
- Succeeded by: Krushna Chandra Pattnaik
- Constituency: Berhampur

Personal details
- Born: January 1, 1935
- Died: January 21, 2019 (aged 84)
- Party: Independent

Ratna Manjari Devi was an Indian politician. She was elected to the Odisha Legislative Assembly as an independent defeating Binayak Acharya in 1977 from Berhampur.
