= Kesinga Assembly constituency =

Former constituency of the Odisha Legislative Assembly

Kesinga
- Former constituency for the Odisha Legislative Assembly

Constituency details
- Country: India
- Region: East India
- State: Odisha
- District: Kalahandi
- Lok Sabha constituency: Kalahandi
- Established: 1961
- Abolished: 2008
- Reservation: None

Kesinga was an Assembly constituency from Kalahandi district of Odisha. It was established in 1961 as Madanpur Rampur constituency & in 1966 delimitation, the name was changed to Kesinga. It was abolished in 2008. After 2008 delimitation, It was subsumed by the Narla and Bhawanipatna.

== Members of Legislative Assembly ==
Between 1961 & 2008, 11 elections were held.

List of members elected from Kesinga constituency are:

Year	Member	Party
As Madanpur Rampur constituency
1961	Birakeshari Deo	All India Ganatantra Parishad
As Kesinga constituency
1967	Bhagaban Bhoi	Swatantra Party
1971	Bhagaban Bhoi	Swatantra Party
1974	Sarat Chandra Singh Deo	Swatantra Party
1977	Nagendra Nath Choudhury	Janata Party
1980	Bhupinder Singh	Indian National Congress (I)
1985	Bhupinder Singh	Indian National Congress
1990	Kiran Chandra Singh Deo	Janata Dal
1995	Bhupinder Singh	Indian National Congress
2000	Dhaneswar Majhi	Bharatiya Janata Party
2004	Dhaneswar Majhi	Bharatiya Janata Party
