= Birmaharajpur Assembly constituency =

Constituency of the Odisha legislative assembly in India

Coordinates: 20.87°N 84.05°E

Birmaharajpur
- Constituency No. 64 for the Odisha Legislative Assembly

Constituency details
- Country: India
- Region: East India
- State: Odisha
- Division: Northern Division
- District: Subarnapur
- Lok Sabha constituency: Bolangir
- Established: 1951
- Total electors: 2,16,088 (Note: as on 2024) (Note: as data published by election commission)
- Reservation: SC

Member of Legislative Assembly
- 17th Odisha Legislative Assembly
- Incumbent Raghunath Jagadala
- Party: Bharatiya Janata Party
- Elected year: 2024

Birmaharajpur is a Vidhan Sabha constituency of Subarnapur district, Odisha. After 2008 Delimitation, Binka Assembly constituency was subsumed into this constituency.

This constituency includes Binika NAC, Birmaharajpur block, Ullunda block and 13 GPs (Babupalli, Bankigirdi, Bausuni, Bhandar, Charda, Kaintara, Mahadevpalli, Meghala, Seledi, Shankara, Silati, Sindurpur and Singhijuba) of Binika block.

== Elected members ==
Vote share of winning candidates
2024	48.19%
2019	39.07%
2014	46.01%
2009	48.67%
2003 (bypoll)	53.62%
2004	54.04%
2000	36.12%
1995	37.56%
1990	68.55%
1985	38.54%
1980	48.29%
1977	64.56%

Since its formation in 1951, 14 elections were held till date including in one bypoll in 2006. The constituency didn't exist from 1957 to 1971.

Elected members from the Birmaharajpur constituency are:

Year	Member	Party
2024	Raghunath Jagadala	Bharatiya Janata Party
2019	Padmanabha Behera	Biju Janata Dal
2014	Padmanabha Behera	Biju Janata Dal
2009	Padmanabha Behera	Biju Janata Dal
2004	Sanjeeb Kumar Sahoo	Biju Janata Dal
2003 (Bypoll) (Note: Death of Baishnaba Pradhan)	Sanjeeb Kumar Sahoo	Biju Janata Dal
2000	Baishnaba Pradhan	Biju Janata Dal
1995	Rama Chandra Pradhan	Indian National Congress
1990	Rabinarayan Panigrahi	Janata Dal
1985	Kartika Prasad Taria	Indian National Congress
1980	Hrushikesh Hota	Indian National Congress (I)
1977	Surendra Pradhan	Janata Party
1974	Hrushikesh Hota	Indian National Congress
1957-1971 : Constituency did not exist
1951	Achutananda Mahakur	Ganatantra Parishad

== Election results ==
=== 2024 ===
Voting were held on 20 May 2024 in 2nd phase of Odisha Assembly Election & 5th phase of Indian General Election. Counting of votes was on 4 June 2024. In 2024 election, Bharatiya Janata Party candidate Raghunath Jagadala defeated Biju Janata Dal candidate Padmanabh Behera by a margin of 21,946 votes.

2024 Odisha Vidhan Sabha Election, Birmaharajpur
Party	Candidate	Votes	%	±%
BJP	Raghunath Jagadala	85,680	48.19	▲16.94
BJD	Padmanabha Behera	63,734	35.84	▼3.23
INC	Pradip Kumar Sethy	22,576	12.7	▼11.71
NOTA	None of the above	1,559	0.88	▲0.24
Majority		21,946	12.35	
Turnout		1,77,809	82.29	
BJP gain from BJD				

=== 2019 ===
In 2014 election, Biju Janata Dal candidate Padmanabha Behera defeated Bharatiya Janata Party candidate Raghunath Jagdala by a margin of 13,057 votes.

2019 Vidhan Sabha Election, Birmaharajpur
Party	Candidate	Votes	%	±%
BJD	Padmanabha Behera	65,202	39.07	▼6.94
BJP	Raghunath Jagadala	52,145	31.25	▲6.48
INC	Binod Patra	40,735	24.41	▲0.93
NOTA	None of the above	1,074	0.64	
Majority		13,057	7.82	
Turnout		1,66,883	79.83	
BJD hold				

=== 2014 ===
In 2014 election, Biju Janata Dal candidate Padmanabha Behera defeated Bharatiya Janata Party candidate Ananda Barik by a margin of 31,290 votes.

2014 Vidhan Sabha Election, Birmaharajpur
Party	Candidate	Votes	%	±%
BJD	Padmanabha Behera	67,774	46.01	▼2.66
BJP	Ananda Barik	36,484	24.77	▲8.96
INC	Kartik Prasad Taria	34,589	23.48	▼8.34
NOTA	None of the above	2,201	1.49	−
Majority		31,290	21.24	
Turnout		1,47,305	79.66	7.14
Registered electors		1,84,923		
BJD hold				

=== 2009 ===
In 2009 election, Biju Janata Dal candidate Padmanabha Behera defeated Indian National Congress candidate Binod Patra by a margin of 21,401 votes.

2009 Vidhan Sabha Election, Birmaharajpur
Party	Candidate	Votes	%	±%
BJD	Padmanabha Behera	61,803	48.67	▼5.37
INC	Binod Patra	40,402	31.82	−
BJP	Damayanti Barik	20,075	15.81	−
Majority		21,401	16.85 (Note: %of total valid votes)	−
Turnout		1,27,013	72.52	−
BJD hold				
