= Kumar Majhi =

Indian politician

Member of Parliament, Lok Sabha
- In office 1971-1977
- Preceded by: Gurucharan Naik
- Succeeded by: Govinda Munda
- Constituency: Keonjhar, Odisha

Personal details
- Born: 10 February 1943 (age 83) Purunapani, Keonjhar District, Odisha British India
- Party: Indian National Congress
- Spouse: Mandadari Majhi

Kumar Majhi was an Indian politician. He was elected to the Lok Sabha, lower house of the Parliament of India from Keonjhar in Odisha as a member of the Indian National Congress.
