= Padmanabha Behera =

Indian politician

Member of Odisha Legislative Assembly
- In office 2009–2024
- Constituency: Birmaharajpur
- In office 2004–2009
- Constituency: Phulbani
- In office 1990–1995
- Constituency: Phulbani

Member of Parliament, Lok Sabha
- In office 1998–2004
- Constituency: Phulbani, Odisha

Personal details
- Born: 16 March 1956 (age 69) Bilupadar, Kandhamal district, Odisha
- Political party: Biju Janata Dal
- Spouse: Bishnu Priya Behera
- Parent: Late Kartika Behera
- Profession: Politician

Padmanabha Behera is an Indian politician from Odisha. He was a five time elected Member of the Odisha Legislative Assembly from Birmaharajpur Assembly constituency in 2009, 2014 and 2019 and Phulbani Assembly constituency in 1990 & 2004. He was also elected to Lok Sabha for 2 times from Phulbani Lok Sabha constituency in 1998 & 1999. He has been Minister of Commerce and Transport in Odisha Government. His wife, Bishnu Priya Behera was also minister in Odisha Govt.

== See also ==
- 2009 Odisha Legislative Assembly election
- Odisha Legislative Assembly
