= Kissannagar Assembly Constituency =

Former constituency of the Odisha Legislative Assembly

Kissannagar
- Former constituency for the Odisha Legislative Assembly

Constituency details
- Country: India
- Region: East India
- State: Odisha
- District: Cuttack
- Lok Sabha constituency: Cuttack
- Established: 1951
- Abolished: 2008
- Reservation: None

Kissannagar was an Assembly constituency from Cuttack district of Odisha. It was established in 1951 and abolished in 1957. It was revived in 1974 and abolished in 2008. Following 2008 Delimitation, It was subsumed into the Barabati-Cuttack Assembly constituency.

== Elected members ==
Between 1951 & 2008, 9 elections were held.

List of members elected from Kissannagar constituency are:

Year	Member	Party
1951	Rajakrushna Bose	Indian National Congress
1957-1974: Constituency didn't exist
1974	Batakrushna Jena	Utkal Congress
1977	Batakrushna Jena	Janata Party
1980	Surendranath Patnaik	Independent
1985	Batakrushna Jena	Indian National Congress
1990	Yudhistir Das	Janata Dal
1995	Yudhistir Das	Janata Dal
2000	Pratap Jena	Biju Janata Dal
2004	Pratap Jena	Biju Janata Dal
From 2009: Barabati-Cuttack
