= Ajay Kumar Jena =

Indian politician (1943–2023)

Member of the Odisha Legislative Assembly for Brahmagiri Assembly
- In office 3 March 1990 – 15 March 1995
- Preceded by: Gangadhara Mohapatra
- Succeeded by: Lalatendu Bidyadhar Mohapatra
- In office 26 June 1977 – 17 February 1980
- Preceded by: Sidheswar Panigrahi
- Succeeded by: Gangadhara Mohapatra

Personal details
- Born: 27 July 1943
- Died: 24 October 2023 (aged 80)
- Party: Janata Party; Janata Dal

Ajaya Kumar Jena (Odia: ଅଜୟ କୁମାର ଜେନା; 27 July 1943 – 24 October 2023) was an Indian politician. A member of the Janata Party and later Janata Dal, he served in the Odisha Legislative Assembly from 1977 to 1980 and again from 1990 to 1995.

Jena died on 24 October 2023, at the age of 80.
