= Chilika Assembly constituency =

Constituency of the Odisha legislative assembly in India

Coordinates: 19.52°N 85.10°E

Chilika
- Constituency No. 118 for the Odisha Legislative Assembly
- Chilika Assembly constituency in Khordha district

Constituency details
- Country: India
- Region: East India
- State: Odisha
- Division: Central Division
- District: Khordha
- Lok Sabha constituency: Puri
- Established: 1974
- Total electors: 2,34,073 (Note: as on 2024) (Note: as data published by election commission)
- Reservation: None

Member of Legislative Assembly
- 17th Odisha Legislative Assembly
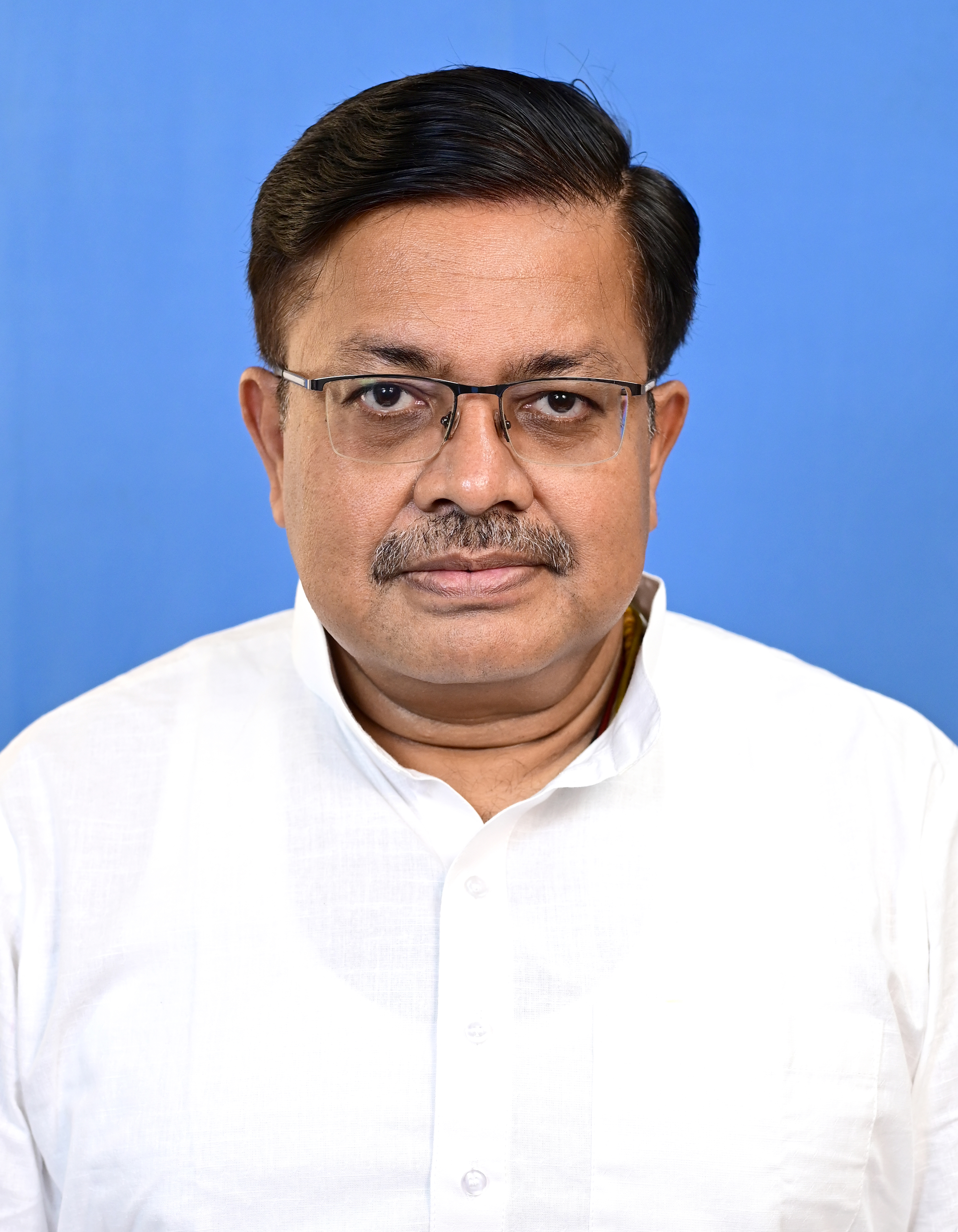
- Incumbent Prithviraj Harichandan
- Party: Bharatiya Janata Party
- Elected year: 2024

Chilika is a Vidhan Sabha constituency of Khordha district, Odisha, India.

This constituency includes Banapur, Balugaon, and Chilika block.

== Elected members ==
Vote share of winning candidates
2024	49.51%
2019	50.29%
2014	46.70%
2009	45.59%
2004	52.81%
2000	57.40%
1995	51.33%
1990	68.72%
1985	54.80%
1980	50.14%
1977	41.61%

Since its formation in 1951, 12 elections were held till date.

List of members elected from Chilika constituency are:

Year	Member	Party
2024	Prithviraj Harichandan	Bharatiya Janata Party
2019	Prasanta Kumar Jagadev	Biju Janata Dal
2014	Bibhuti Bhusan Harichandan	Bharatiya Janata Party
2009	Raghunath Sahu	Biju Janata Dal
2004	Bibhuti Bhusan Harichandan	Bharatiya Janata Party
2000	Bibhuti Bhusan Harichandan	Bharatiya Janata Party
1995	Debendranath Mansingh	Indian National Congress
1990	Biswabhusan Harichandan	Janata Dal
1985	Debendranath Mansingh	Indian National Congress
1980	Debendranath Mansingh	Indian National Congress (I)
1977	Biswabhusan Harichandan	Janata Party
1974 (Bypoll) (Note: In 1974 Odisha Legislative Assembly election, no nomination was filed, thus no election was held.)	Raghunath Ray	Indian National Congress

== Election results ==
=== 2024 ===
Voting was held on 25 May 2024 in the 3rd phase of the Odisha Assembly Election & 6th phase of the Indian General Election. The counting of votes was on 4 June 2024. In 2024 assembly election, Bharatiya Janata Party candidate Prithiviraj Harichandan defeated Biju Janata Dal candidate Raghunath Sahu by a margin of 4,566 votes.

2024 Odisha Vidhan Sabha Election, Chilika
Party	Candidate	Votes	%	±%
BJP	Prithviraj Harichandan	83,264	49.51	
BJD	Raghunath Sahu	78,698	46.8	
INC	Pradeep Kumar Swain	3,082	1.83	
NOTA	None of the above	1,048	0.62	
Majority		4,566	2.71	
Turnout		1,68,161	71.84	
BJP gain from BJD				

=== 2019 ===
In the 2019 election, Biju Janata Dal candidate Prasanta Kumar Jagadev defeated Bharatiya Janata Party candidate Prithviraj Harichandan by a margin of 10,856 votes.

2019 Vidhan Sabha Election, Chilika
Party	Candidate	Votes	%	±%
BJD	Prasanta Kumar Jagadev	80,133	50.29	
BJP	Prithviraj Harichandan	69,277	43.48	
INC	Pradip Kumar Swain	4,939	3.1	
NOTA	None of the above	881	0.55	
Majority		10856	6.81	
Turnout		1,59,340	70.84	
BJD gain from BJP				

=== 2014 ===
In 2014 election, Bharatiya Janata Party candidate Bibhuti Bhusan Harichandan defeated Biju Janata Dal candidate Raghunath Sahu by a margin of 541 votes.

2014 Vidhan Sabha Election, Chilika
Party	Candidate	Votes	%	±%
BJP	Bibhuti Bhusan Harichandan	69,433	46.7	−
BJD	Raghunath Sahu	68,892	46.34	−
INC	Manasi Pradhan	5,182	3.49	−
NOTA	None of the above	1,310	0.88	−
Majority		541	0.36	
Turnout		1,48,671	73.3	
Registered electors		2,00,341		
BJP gain from BJD				

=== 2009 ===
In 2009 election, Biju Janta Dal candidate Raghunath Sahu defeated Bharatiya Janata Party candidate Bibhuti Bhusan Harichandan by a margin of 3,066 votes.

2009 Vidhan Sabha Election, Chilika
Party	Candidate	Votes	%	±%
BJD	Raghunath Sahu	57,216	45.59	−
BJP	Bibhuti Bhusan Harichandan	54,150	43.15	−
INC	Manas Ranjan Mangaraj	11,204	8.93	−
Majority		3,066	2.44 (Note: %of total valid votes)	−
Turnout		1,25,512	66.04 (Note: 2004 Voter turnout was 68.12%)	▼2.08
Registered electors		1,90,062		
BJD gain from BJP				
