= Syed Mustafiz Ahmed =

Indian politician (1941–2017)

- ସୟଦ ମୁସ୍ତାଫିଜ ଅହମଦ
- Born: 21 December 1941
- Died: 11 September 2017 (aged 75); Cuttack
- Citizenship: Indian
- Political party: Janata Dal, Janata Party

Syed Mustafiz Ahmed (21 December 1941 - 11 September 2017, Cuttack) was an Indian politician who was member of Odisha Legislative Assembly from 1985 to 1995. He served as health and family Welfare Minister besides holding the portfolio of Textile and Industry Departments in chief minister Biju Patnaik's cabinet from 1990 to 1995. He was member of Janata Dal.

He died on 11 September 2017.
