= Kiran Chandra Singh Deo =

Indian politician and Freedom fighter

- କିରଣ ଚନ୍ଦ୍ର ସିଂହ ଦେଓ

Member: 10th Odisha Legislative Assembly
- In office 1990–1990
- Preceded by: Bhupinder Singh
- Succeeded by: Bhupinder Singh
- Constituency: Kesinga

Personal details
- Born: 19 March 1930
- Died: 3 December 2011 (aged 81) Purulia, West Bengal
- Cause of death: Heart failure
- Citizenship: Indian
- Party: Biju Janata Dal
- Other political affiliations: Janata Dal
- Spouse: Sushila Singh Deo
- Parent: Madan Mohan Singh Deo (father)
- Occupation: Politician

Kiran Chandra Singh Deo (9 March 1930 – 3 December 2011) was an Indian politician and Freedom fighter from Odisha. He was one of the founding members of Biju Janata Dal in Odisha politics. He was elected to the Odisha Legislative Assembly from Kesinga Vidhan Sabha constituency in the 1990 Odisha Legislative Assembly election as a member of the Janata Dal.

== Early life and family ==
Kiran Chandra Singh Deo was born on 9 March 1930 in Kalahandi district Odisha to Madan Mohan Singh Deo.

== Political career ==
Kiran Chandra Singh Deo joined the Students' Movement in 1946 against feudal forces. Later he joined politics and joined Janata Dal. In the 1990 Odisha Vidhan Sabha election, he was elected to the 10th Odisha Legislative Assembly from the Kesinga Vidhan Sabha constituency. He was the PWD and Works minister from 1991 to 1995 in Biju Patnaik's Government.

In 1997, when Biju Janata Dal was formed by Naveen Patnaik, he joined BJD. He was the chief of the BJD Kalahandi district from 1997 to 2009. Singhdeo was the president of Bhawanipatna Central Cooperative Bank from 2004 to 2008. He was working president of Kalahandi District Athletics Association from 2007.

== Death ==
He died on 3 December 2011 due to Heart failure at the age of 81. He was in Purulia of West Bengal to attend a marriage function when he suffered a heart attack. Though he was rushed to a hospital, he had been declared brought dead.
