= Bed Prakash Agarwal =

Indian politician (died 2019)

Bed Prakash Agarwal (died April 20, 2019) was an Indian politician.

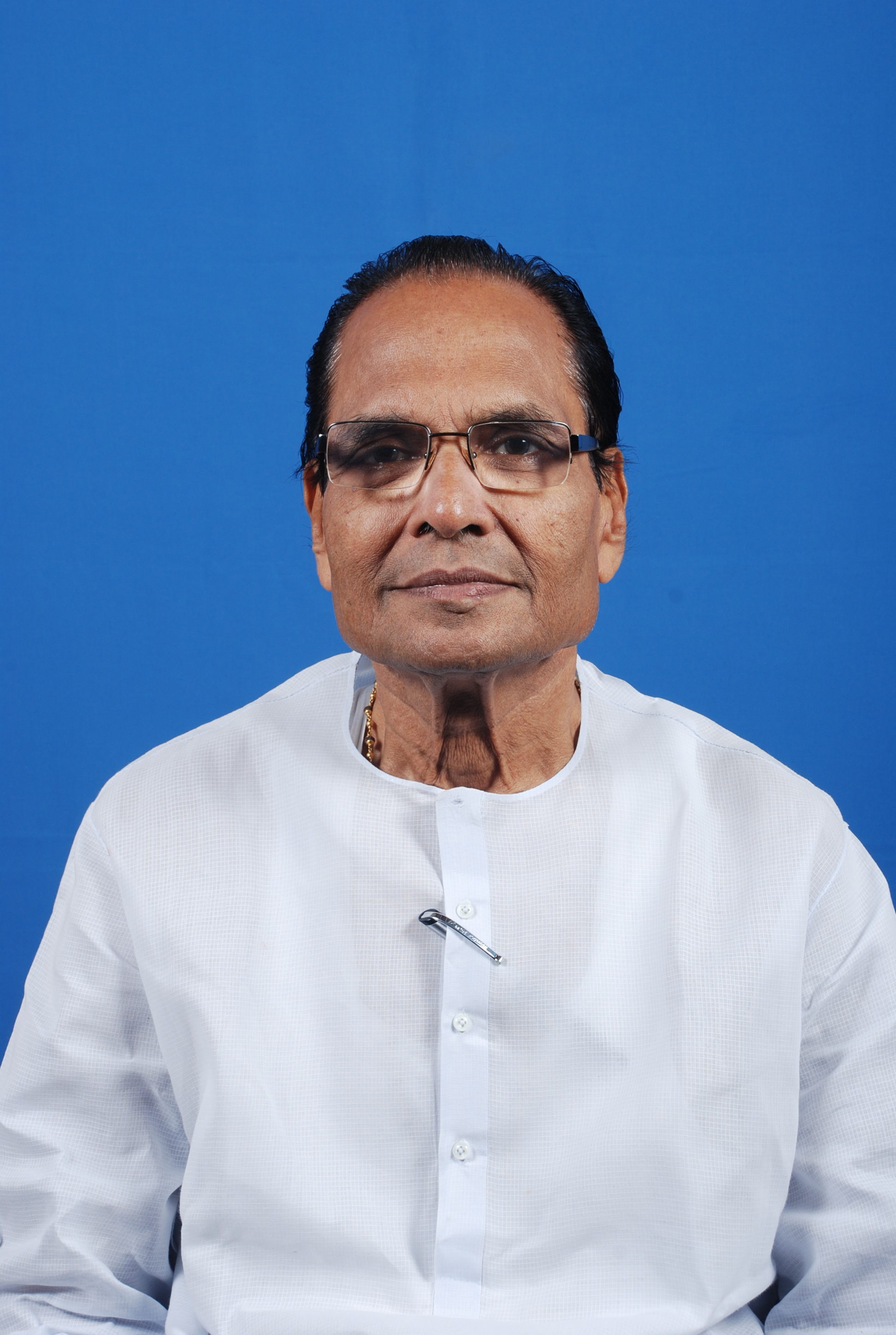
Bed Prakash Agarawal

== Biography ==
Agarwal was of Marwari descent and a native of Patkura. He was a member of the Kendrapara municipal council from 1957 to 1970, when he began serving as chairman of the municipality. He left office in 1974 to contest the Kendrapara seat in the Odisha Legislative Assembly, and was seated as a representative of the Utkal Congress. Agarwal switched affiliations to the Janata Party and was reelected in 1977. He grew close to Biju Patnaik, joined the Janata Dal for the 1990 elections, and served as finance minister within Patnaik's government. Following Patnaik's death in 1997, Agarwal contested the 2000 Odisha legislative elections as a member of the Bharatiya Janata Party. Agarwal won the Patkura seat in 2009 and 2014, for Biju Janata Dal, and remained the BJD candidate for the 2019 elections until his death in Bhubaneswar on 20 April 2019.
