= Birabhadra Singh =

Indian politician

Personal details
- Born: 3 March 1945 (age 81) Basipitha, Khunta, Mayurbhanj District, Odisha
- Spouse: Malati Singh
- Parent: Shri Dalaka Singh (father)
- Education: M.A.
- Alma mater: Utkal University

Birabhadra Singh (born 3 March 1945) is an Indian politician from Odisha. He is a three time member of the Odisha Legislative Assembly and a former deputy chief minister of Odisha. He was also a former Rajya Sabha member from 2000 to 2006. Singh, a close friend of former President of India, Ramnath Kovind, met him when the president visited Odisha in December 2019.

== Early life and education ==
Singh is from Talakanda, Khunta post, Mayurbhanj district, Odisha. He is the son of late Dalaka Singh. He married Malati Singh and together they have a son and two daughters. He is a post graduate in arts and education. He was a student of Utkal University during 1965 and 1966.

== Career ==
Singh first became an MLA from and served the 5th Odisha Legislative Assembly from Khunta Assembly constituency as a member of Utkal Congress from 1971 to 1973. He won for a second time in 1977 from Udala Assembly constituency, which is also reserved for Scheduled Tribe community. He became an MLA for the third time winning the 1990 Odisha Legislative Assembly election from Khunta representing Janata Dal. He served as an irrigation and power minister and the deputy chief minister from 21 January 1972 to 14 June 1972. From June 1977 to February 1980, he was the minister of state for tribal and rural welfare and later he worked as a minister of state for irrigation, for a short period from October 1979 to February 1980.
