= Harish Chandra Buxipatra =

Indian politician (1933–2000)

Harish Chandra Buxipatra (17 November 1933 – 27 October 2000) was an Indian politician from the State of Orissa. He was a member of Orissa Legislative Assembly from Koraput constituency during 1974 and in 1990 (Tenth Assembly – 3 March 1990 to 15 March 1995) and became a minister. He was an activist and writer who took active part in the JP movement. Shri Baxipatra Joined C.P.I. in 1959 during student career. He was a trade unionist and also head of AISF of the State. Later in 1973, he joined Utkal Congress.

He is survived by one son namely Bhrugu Baxipatra and 3 daughters.
