= V. Sugnana Kumari Deo =

Indian politician (1936/1937–2024)

V. Sugyani Kumari Deo
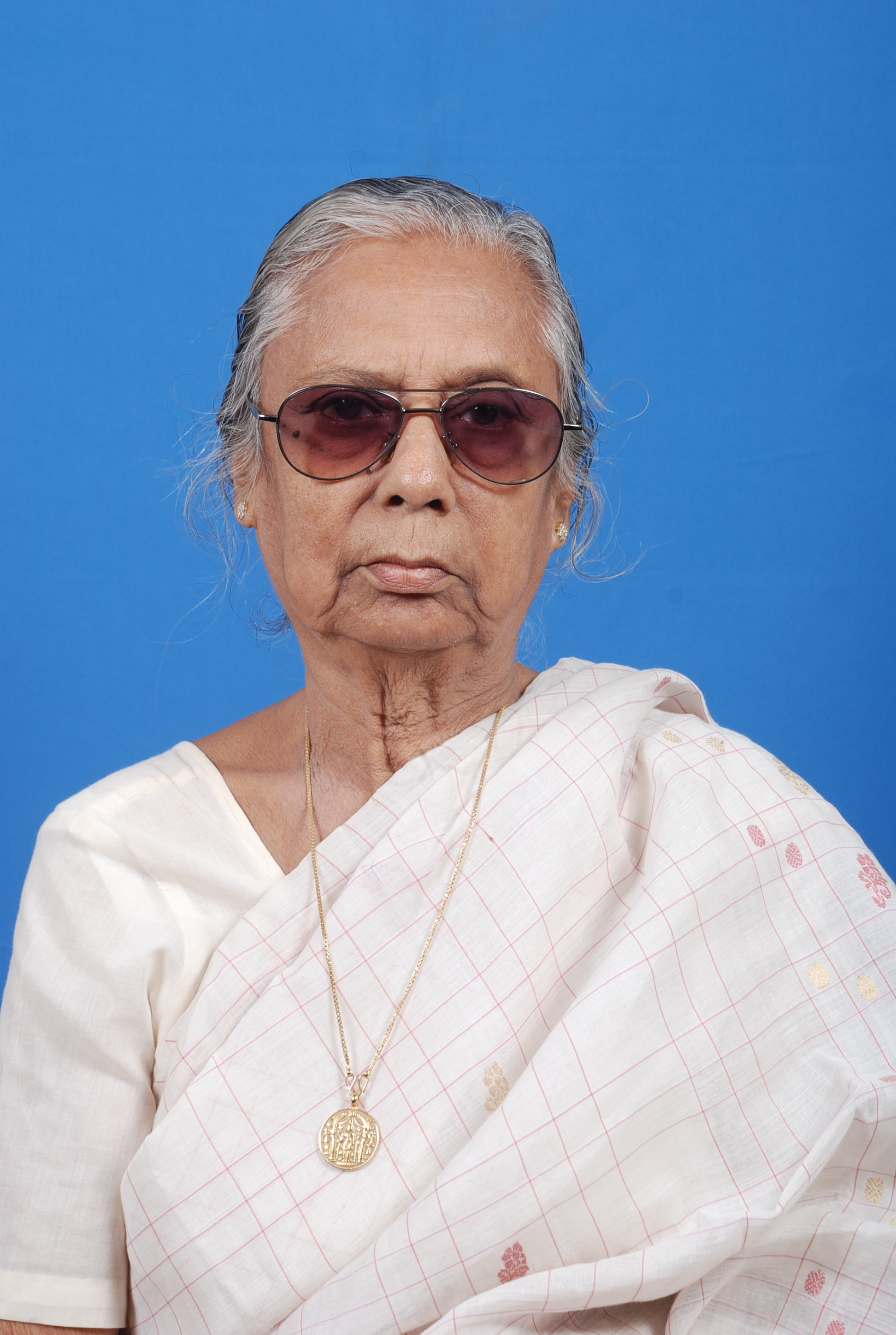

Member of Odisha Legislative assembly
- In office 2009–2019
- Constituency: Kabisuryanagar

Personal details
- Born: 8 August 1937
- Died: 10 February 2024 (aged 87) Chennai, Tamil Nadu, India
- Party: Biju Janata Dal

V. Sugyani Kumari Deo (1936/1937 – 10 February 2024) was an Indian politician from Odisha. She was first elected to state assembly in 1963 and won a total of 10 times in her political career. Deo belonged to the royal family of Khallikote and was the daughter-in-law of Raja Ramchandra Mardaraja Deo. She was the Pro-tem speaker of the 15th Odisha assembly. Deo died on 10 February 2024, at the age of 87.
