= Bhagabat Behera =

Indian politician from Odisha (1940–2002)

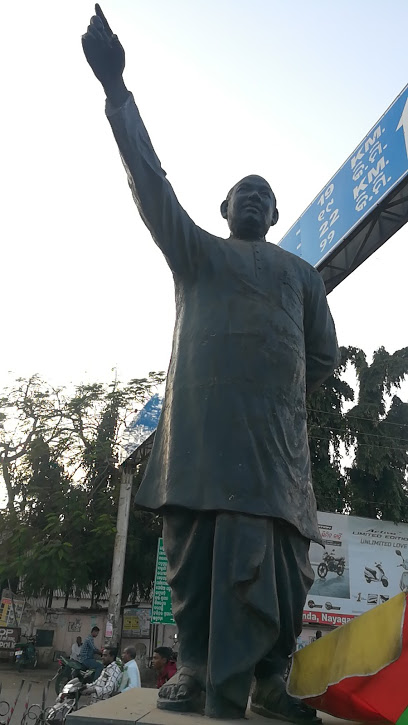
- Statue of Behera at Khandapada Road in Nayagarh District

Minister for Commerce & Transport, Government of Odisha
- In office 1990–1991

Minister for Commerce & Transport (Except Aviation), Government of Odisha
- In office 1991–1993

Minister for Food & Civil Supplies , Government of Odisha
- In office 1993–1995

Minister for School & Mass Education, Government of Odisha
- In office 2000–2002

Member:Odisha Legislative Assembly (Nayagarh Assembly)
- In office 1974–1977
- In office 1977–1980
- In office 1985–1990
- In office 1990–1995
- In office 2000 – 3 June 2002(Expired)

Personal details
- Born: March 2, 1940 Nayagarh, Odisha, (British India)
- Died: 3 June 2002 (aged 62)
- Party: Biju Janata Dal
- Other political affiliations: Socialist Party (1974–1977), Janata (1977–1980), Janata Party (1985–1990), Janata Dal (1990–1995), Biju Janata Dal (2000– expired)
- Spouse: Mandakini Behera
- Children: 4 daughters
- Parent: Narayan Behera (father)
- Education: M.A., LL.B
- Profession: lawyer, politician

Bhagabat Behera (1940–2002) was an Indian politician from Odisha. He was a close associate of Biju Patnaik, and was also a former Cabinet Minister and 5-time MLA from Nayagarh in the Odisha Legislative Assembly.

== Early life and education ==
Bhagabat Behera was born to Narayan Behera in a Hindu Gopal (Yadav) family at Biruda Gram Panchayat of Nayagarh, Odisha. He completed his graduation from Ravenshaw University, Cuttack.
