= Utkal Congress =

- Abbreviation: UC
- Founded: 1969
- Dissolved: 1974
- Merged into: Pragati Legislature Party; Bharatiya Lok Dal (eventually)
- ECI Status: Dissolved

Utkal Congress was a political party in the Indian state of Odisha. It was formed in 1969 when Biju Patnaik left Indian National Congress. After the 1971 Odisha elections UC took part in the Bishwanath Das ministry in the state. In 1974 Utkal Congress merged into Pragati Legislature Party which eventually merged into Bharatiya Lok Dal.

== Background ==
Odisha was a stronghold of Congress in the immediate post-independence era. However factionalism was rife. A group of Congress dissidents led by Harekrushna Mahatab split in 1967 to form Jana Congress. In the 1967 general election, most of the leadership of Congress lost. In 1969 Congress split at national level forming Congress(O) and Congress(R). Biju Patnaik remained with Congress(R) which was led by Indira Gandhi. However, in 1970 Rajya sabha elections the state unit proposed a different candidate to that of the central leadership. However, in the election both candidates lost. This caused Biju Patnaik led group to sever all the ties from the central leadership. Initially named as Utkal Pradesh Congress, the group ultimately chose Utkal Congress as their name with Biju Patnaik, Rabi Ray along with securing support from two former Chief Ministers of Odisha - Harekrushna Mahtab, R.N.Singh Deo (Swatantra Party) & the Samyukta Socialist Party whose state unit merged into the Utkal Congress in 1972 following the SSP's dissolution.

== Electoral history ==
Biju Patnaik resigned from Congress(R) on 6 April 1970. Following that he along with his colleagues Nilamani Routray formed the state based party in the model of DMK. This fledgling party Fought its first election soon after in 1971 General elections. It secured 24% votes and 32 seats. It formed a coalition with Swatantra Party and formed a government under leadership Bishwanath Das. This government did not last for long and few of the Utkal Congress members wanted to go back to Congress(I) (Congress(R) had named itself Congress (I) at this point). So a Congress(I) government under the leadership of Nandini Satpathy formed. However this government did not last long either. There was an election in 1974 to Odisha legislature. Utkal Congress formed a coalition with Swatatantra party and a group of Congress (I) members led by Harekrushna Mahtab called Pragati Legislature party. In the election Utkal Congress slightly increased it tally to 35 seats. However Congress won the majority. At the end of 1974 all the constituents of Pragati Legislature party merged with Charan Singh led Bharatiya Lok Dal.

== See also ==
- Indian National Congress breakaway parties
