= 17th Odisha Legislative Assembly =

17th state legislature of the Indian state of Odisha

←	16th Assembly
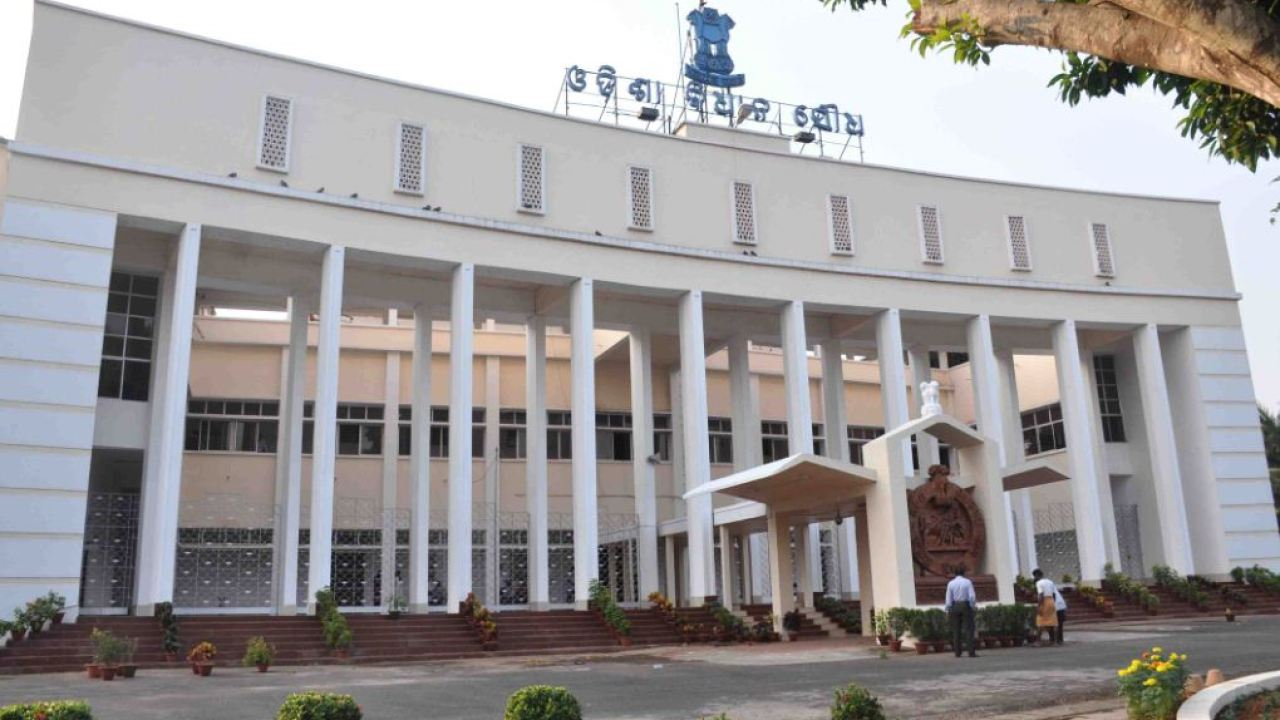
- Front view of Odisha Bidhana Soudha, Bhubaneswar

Overview
- Meeting place: Odisha Vidhan Saudha, Bhubaneswar, Odisha, India
- Term: 4 June 2024 – Incumbent
- Election: 2024 Odisha Legislative Assembly election
- Government: Bharatiya Janata Party
- Opposition: Biju Janata Dal
- Website: assembly.odisha.gov.in

Odisha Legislative Assembly
- House Composition as of today
- Members: 147
- Governor: Raghubar Das; Kambhampati Hari Babu; Braj Mohan Ram
- Speaker: Surama Padhy, BJP
- Deputy Speaker: Bhabani Shankar Bhoi, BJP
- Leader of the House (Chief Minister): Mohan Charan Majhi, BJP
- Deputy Leader of the House (Deputy Chief Minister): Kanak Vardhan Singh Deo, BJP; Pravati Parida, BJP
- Leader of Opposition: Naveen Patnaik, BJD
- Party control: BJP (81/147)
- 7 Sessions with 78 Sittings

The Seventeenth Odisha Legislative Assembly was constituted after the 2024 Odisha Legislative Assembly elections, which were concluded on 1 June 2024, with the previous assembly term ending on 24 June 2024.

== Brief history ==
Following the BJP's victory in the 2024 election, Chief Minister Mohan Charan Majhi, along with his two deputy Chief Ministers, eight Cabinet Ministers, and five Ministers of State with Independent Charge, were administered their oaths of office and secrecy by Governor Raghubar Das at Janata Maidan, Bhubaneswar on 12 June 2024. Prime Minister Narendra Modi, Home Minister Amit Shah, Defense Minister Rajnath Singh, and Chief Ministers from 10 BJP-ruled states attended the ceremony.

In 2025, the BJP won the Nuapada by-election, increasing its assembly strength to 79 seats.

Following allegations of cross-voting during the March 2026 Rajya Sabha elections, the BJD suspended eight of its MLAs and the INC suspended three of its MLAs from internal party activities, subsequently filing disqualification petitions with the Speaker under the Tenth Schedule. On 22 June 2026, Assembly Speaker Surama Padhy dismissed all 11 petitions due to procedural defects and lack of authenticated evidence, allowing the legislators to retain their full legislative membership under their original party banners.

== House Composition ==
Party	Strength	
Party	Assembly Begins	As of today
Bharatiya Janata Party	78	79
Biju Janata Dal	51	50
Indian National Congress	14	14
Communist Party of India (Marxist)	1	1
Independent	3	3
Total	147	147

== Office bearers ==
Office bearers of the 17th Odisha Legislative Assembly
Position	Portrait	Name	Took office	Left office	Party
Governor		Raghubar Das	Assembly Begins	2 January 2025	N/A
Governor		Kambhampati Hari Babu	3 January 2025	17 October 2026	N/A
Governor		Braj Mohan Ram	18 October 2026	Incumbent	N/A
Speaker		Surama Padhy; MLA for Ranpur	20 June 2024	Incumbent	BJP
Deputy Speaker		Bhabani Shankar Bhoi; MLA for Talsara	25 July 2024	Incumbent	BJP
Leader of the House (Chief Minister)		Mohan Charan Majhi; MLA for Keonjhar	12 June 2024	Incumbent	BJP
Deputy Leader of the House (Deputy Chief Minister)		Kanak Vardhan Singh Deo; MLA for Patnagarh	12 June 2024	Incumbent	BJP
Deputy Leader of the House (Deputy Chief Minister)		Pravati Parida; MLA for Nimapara	12 June 2024	Incumbent	BJP
Minister for Parliamentary Affairs		Dr. Mukesh Mahaling; MLA for Loisingha	12 June 2024	Incumbent	BJP
Government Chief Whip		Saroj Kumar Pradhan; MLA for Boudh	22 July 2024	Incumbent	BJP
Government Deputy Chief Whip		Gobinda Chandra Das; MLA for Remuna	22 July 2024	Incumbent	BJP
Leader of the Opposition		Naveen Patnaik; MLA for Hinjili	19 June 2024	Incumbent	BJD
Deputy Leader of the Opposition		Prasanna Acharya; MLA for Rairakhol	19 June 2024	Incumbent	BJD
Opposition Chief Whip		Pramila Mallik; MLA for Binjharpur	24 June 2024	Incumbent	BJD
Opposition Deputy Chief Whip		Pratap Keshari Deb; MLA for Aul	24 June 2024	Incumbent	BJD
Leader of Congress Legislature Party		Rama Chandra Kadam; MLA for Pottangi	21 July 2024	Incumbent	INC
Deputy Leader of Congress Legislature Party		Ashok Das; MLA for Basudevpur	21 July 2024	Incumbent	INC
Congress Chief Whip		Lt. Col. (Retd.) Dr. C. S. Raazen Ekka; MLA for Rajgangpur	21 July 2024	Incumbent	INC
Pro tem Speaker		Ranendra Pratap Swain; MLA for Athagarh	17 June 2024	19 June 2024	BJD

== Council of Minister ==
Majhi Ministry Council of Ministers
Portfolio	Portrait	Minister	Constituency	Took office	Left office	Party
Chief Minister; Home; General Administration & Public Grievance; Finance; Information & Public Relations; Water Resources; Planning & Convergence; Other departments not allocated to any Minister		Mohan Charan Majhi	Keonjhar	12 June 2024	Incumbent	BJP
Deputy Chief Ministers
Agriculture & Farmers' Empowerment; Energy		Kanak Vardhan Singh Deo	Patnagarh	12 June 2024	Incumbent	BJP
Women & Child Development; Mission Shakti; Tourism		Pravati Parida	Nimapara	12 June 2024	Incumbent	BJP
Cabinet Ministers
Revenue & Disaster Management		Suresh Pujari	Brajarajnagar	12 June 2024	Incumbent	BJP
Rural Development; Panchayati Raj & Drinking Water		Rabi Narayan Naik	Kuchinda	12 June 2024	Incumbent	BJP
School & Mass Education; S.T. & S.C. Development, Minorities & Backward Classes Welfare; Social Security & Empowerment of Persons with Disabilities		Nityananda Gond	Umerkote	12 June 2024	Incumbent	BJP
Food Supplies & Consumer Welfare; Science & Technology		Krushna Chandra Patra	Dhenkanal	12 June 2024	Incumbent	BJP
Law; Works; Excise		Prithviraj Harichandan	Chilika	12 June 2024	Incumbent	BJP
Health & Family Welfare; Parliamentary Affairs; Electronics & Information Technology		Dr. Mukesh Mahaling	Loisingha	12 June 2024	Incumbent	BJP
Commerce & Transport; Steel & Mines		Bibhuti Bhusan Jena	Gopalpur	12 June 2024	Incumbent	BJP
Housing & Urban Development; Public Enterprises		Dr. Krushna Chandra Mohapatra	Morada	12 June 2024	Incumbent	BJP
Ministers of State with Independent Charge
Forest, Environment & Climate Change; Labour & Employees' State Insurance		Ganesh Ram Singh Khuntia	Jashipur	12 June 2024	Incumbent	BJP
Higher Education; Sports & Youth Services; Odia Language, Literature & Culture		Suryabanshi Suraj	Dhamnagar	12 June 2024	Incumbent	BJP
Co-operation; Handlooms, Textiles & Handicrafts		Pradeep Bal Samanta	Sukinda	12 June 2024	Incumbent	BJP
Fisheries & Animal Resources Development; Micro, Small & Medium Enterprises		Gokula Nanda Mallik	Polasara	12 June 2024	Incumbent	BJP
Industries; Skill Development & Technical Education		Sampad Chandra Swain	Paradeep	12 June 2024	Incumbent	BJP

== Members of Legislative Assembly ==
Source
District	Ac. No.	Constituency	Name	Party	Remarks
Bargarh	1	Padampur	Barsha Singh Bariha	Biju Janata Dal	
Bargarh	2	Bijepur	Sanat Kumar Gartia	Bharatiya Janata Party	
Bargarh	3	Bargarh	Ashwini Kumar Sarangi	Bharatiya Janata Party	
Bargarh	4	Attabira (SC)	Nihar Ranjan Mahanand	Bharatiya Janata Party	
Bargarh	5	Bhatli	Irasis Acharya	Bharatiya Janata Party	
Jharsuguda	6	Brajarajnagar	Suresh Pujari	Bharatiya Janata Party	Cabinet Minister
Jharsuguda	7	Jharsuguda	Tankadhar Tripathy	Bharatiya Janata Party	
Sundargarh	8	Talsara (ST)	Bhabani Shankar Bhoi	Bharatiya Janata Party	Deputy Speaker
Sundargarh	9	Sundargarh (ST)	Jogesh Kumar Singh	Biju Janata Dal	
Sundargarh	10	Biramitrapur (ST)	Rohit Joseph Tirkey	Biju Janata Dal	
Sundargarh	11	Raghunathpali (SC)	Durga Charan Tanti	Bharatiya Janata Party	
Sundargarh	12	Rourkela	Sarada Prashad Nayak	Biju Janata Dal	
Sundargarh	13	Rajgangpur (ST)	C. S. Raazen Ekka	Indian National Congress	Chief Whip, Congress
Sundargarh	14	Bonai (ST)	Laxman Munda	Communist Party of India (Marxist)	
Sambalpur	15	Kuchinda (ST)	Rabi Narayan Naik	Bharatiya Janata Party	Cabinet Minister
Sambalpur	16	Rengali (SC)	Sudarshan Haripal	Biju Janata Dal	
Sambalpur	17	Sambalpur	Jayanarayan Mishra	Bharatiya Janata Party	
Sambalpur	18	Rairakhol	Prasanna Acharya	Biju Janata Dal	Deputy Leader of Opposition
Deogarh	19	Deogarh	Romanch Ranjan Biswal	Biju Janata Dal	
Keonjhar	20	Telkoi (ST)	Fakir Mohan Naik	Bharatiya Janata Party	
Keonjhar	21	Ghasipura	Badri Narayan Patra	Biju Janata Dal	
Keonjhar	22	Anandpur (SC)	Abhimanyu Sethi	Biju Janata Dal	
Keonjhar	23	Patna (ST)	Akhila Chandra Naik	Bharatiya Janata Party	
Keonjhar	24	Keonjhar (ST)	Mohan Charan Majhi	Bharatiya Janata Party	Chief Minister
Keonjhar	25	Champua	Sanatan Mahakud	Biju Janata Dal	Suspended from Party for Anti Party Activities
Mayurbhanj	26	Jashipur (ST)	Ganesh Ram Singh Khuntia	Bharatiya Janata Party	Minister of State (I/C)
Mayurbhanj	27	Saraskana (ST)	Bhadav Hansdah	Bharatiya Janata Party	
Mayurbhanj	28	Rairangpur (ST)	Jalen Naik	Bharatiya Janata Party	
Mayurbhanj	29	Bangriposi (ST)	Sanjali Murmu	Bharatiya Janata Party	
Mayurbhanj	30	Karanjia (ST)	Padma Charan Haiburu	Bharatiya Janata Party	
Mayurbhanj	31	Udala (ST)	Bhaskar Madhei	Bharatiya Janata Party	
Mayurbhanj	32	Badasahi (SC)	Sanatan Bijuli	Bharatiya Janata Party	
Mayurbhanj	33	Baripada (ST)	Prakash Soren	Bharatiya Janata Party	
Mayurbhanj	34	Morada	Krushna Chandra Mohapatra	Bharatiya Janata Party	Cabinet Minister
Balasore	35	Jaleswar	Aswini Kumar Patra	Biju Janata Dal	
Balasore	36	Bhograi	Goutam Buddha Das	Biju Janata Dal	
Balasore	37	Basta	Subasini Jena	Biju Janata Dal	Suspended from Party for cross voting in 2026 RS election
Balasore	38	Balasore	Manas Kumar Dutta	Bharatiya Janata Party	
Balasore	39	Remuna (SC)	Gobinda Chandra Das	Bharatiya Janata Party	Deputy Govt. Chief Whip
Balasore	40	Nilagiri	Santosh Khatua	Bharatiya Janata Party	
Balasore	41	Soro (SC)	Madhab Dhada	Biju Janata Dal	
Balasore	42	Simulia	Padma Lochan Panda	Bharatiya Janata Party	
Bhadrak	43	Bhandaripokhari	Sanjib Kumar Mallick	Biju Janata Dal	
Bhadrak	44	Bhadrak	Sitansu Sekhar Mohapatra	Bharatiya Janata Party	
Bhadrak	45	Basudevpur	Ashok Kumar Das	Indian National Congress	Deputy Leader of Congress Legislature Party
Bhadrak	46	Dhamnagar (SC)	Suryabanshi Suraj	Bharatiya Janata Party	Minister of State (I/C)
Bhadrak	47	Chandabali	Byomakesh Ray	Biju Janata Dal	
Jajpur	48	Binjharpur (SC)	Pramila Mallik	Biju Janata Dal	Chief Whip, BJD
Jajpur	49	Bari	Biswa Ranjan Mallick	Biju Janata Dal	
Jajpur	50	Barchana	Amar Kumar Nayak	Bharatiya Janata Party	
Jajpur	51	Dharmasala	Himanshu Sekhar Sahoo	Independent	Supports Bharatiya Janata Party
Jajpur	52	Jajpur	Sujata Sahu	Biju Janata Dal	
Jajpur	53	Korei	Akash Dasnayak	Bharatiya Janata Party	
Jajpur	54	Sukinda	Pradeep Bal Samanta	Bharatiya Janata Party	Minister of State (I/C)
Dhenkanal	55	Dhenkanal	Krushna Chandra Patra	Bharatiya Janata Party	Cabinet Minister
Dhenkanal	56	Hindol (SC)	Simarani Nayak	Bharatiya Janata Party	
Dhenkanal	57	Kamakhyanagar	Satrughan Jena	Bharatiya Janata Party	
Dhenkanal	58	Parjanga	Bibhuti Bhusan Pradhan	Bharatiya Janata Party	
Angul	59	Pallahara	Ashok Mohanty	Bharatiya Janata Party	
Angul	60	Talcher	Braja Kishore Pradhan	Biju Janata Dal	
Angul	61	Angul	Pratap Chandra Pradhan	Bharatiya Janata Party	
Angul	62	Chhendipada (SC)	Agasti Behera	Bharatiya Janata Party	
Angul	63	Athmallik	Nalini Kanta Pradhan	Biju Janata Dal	
Subarnapur	64	Birmaharajpur (SC)	Raghunath Jagadala	Bharatiya Janata Party	
Subarnapur	65	Sonepur	Niranjan Pujari	Biju Janata Dal	
Bolangir	66	Loisingha (SC)	Mukesh Mahaling	Bharatiya Janata Party	Cabinet Minister
Bolangir	67	Patnagarh	Kanak Vardhan Singh Deo	Bharatiya Janata Party	Deputy Chief Minister
Bolangir	68	Bolangir	Kalikesh Narayan Singh Deo	Biju Janata Dal	
Bolangir	69	Titlagarh	Nabin Kumar Jain	Bharatiya Janata Party	
Bolangir	70	Kantabanji	Laxman Bag	Bharatiya Janata Party	
Nuapada	71	Nuapada	Rajendra Dholakia	Biju Janata Dal	Died on 8 September 2025
Nuapada	71	Nuapada	Jay Dholakia	Bharatiya Janata Party	Won in November 2025 Bypoll
Nuapada	72	Khariar	Adhiraj Mohan Panigrahi	Biju Janata Dal	
Nabarangpur	73	Umarkote (ST)	Nityananda Gond	Bharatiya Janata Party	Cabinet Minister
Nabarangpur	74	Jharigam (ST)	Narsing Bhatra	Bharatiya Janata Party	
Nabarangpur	75	Nabarangpur (ST)	Gouri Shankar Majhi	Bharatiya Janata Party	
Nabarangpur	76	Dabugam (ST)	Manohar Randhari	Biju Janata Dal	
Kalahandi	77	Lanjigarh (ST)	Pradip Kumar Dishari	Biju Janata Dal	
Kalahandi	78	Junagarh	Dibya Shankar Mishra	Biju Janata Dal	
Kalahandi	79	Dharmagarh	Sudhir Ranjan Pattjoshi	Bharatiya Janata Party	
Kalahandi	80	Bhawanipatna (SC)	Sagar Charan Das	Indian National Congress	
Kalahandi	81	Narla	Manorama Mohanty	Biju Janata Dal	
Kandhamal	82	Baliguda (ST)	Chakramani Kanhar	Biju Janata Dal	Suspended from Party for cross voting in 2026 RS election
Kandhamal	83	G. Udayagiri (ST)	Prafulla Chandra Pradhan	Indian National Congress	
Kandhamal	84	Phulbani (ST)	Uma Charan Mallick	Bharatiya Janata Party	
Boudh	85	Kantamal	Kanhai Charan Danga	Bharatiya Janata Party	
Boudh	86	Boudh	Saroj Kumar Pradhan	Bharatiya Janata Party	Govt. Chief Whip
Cuttack	87	Baramba	Bijaya Kumar Dalabehera	Independent	Supports Bharatiya Janata Party
Cuttack	88	Banki	Devi Ranjan Tripathy	Biju Janata Dal	Suspended from Party for cross voting in 2026 RS election
Cuttack	89	Athgarh	Ranendra Pratap Swain	Biju Janata Dal	
Cuttack	90	Barabati-Cuttack	Sofia Firdous	Independent politician	Suspended from Party for cross voting in 2026 RS election
Cuttack	91	Choudwar-Cuttack	Souvic Biswal	Biju Janata Dal	Suspended from Party for cross voting in 2026 RS election
Cuttack	92	Niali (SC)	Chhabi Malik	Bharatiya Janata Party	
Cuttack	93	Cuttack Sadar (SC)	Prakash Chandra Sethi	Bharatiya Janata Party	
Cuttack	94	Salipur	Prasanta Behera	Biju Janata Dal	
Cuttack	95	Mahanga	Sarada Prasad Padhan	Independent	Supports Bharatiya Janata Party
Kendrapara	96	Patkura	Arvind Mohapatra	Biju Janata Dal	Suspended from Party for Anti Party Activities
Kendrapara	97	Kendrapara (SC)	Ganeswar Behera	Biju Janata Dal	
Kendrapara	98	Aul	Pratap Keshari Deb	Biju Janata Dal	Deputy Chief Whip, BJD
Kendrapara	99	Rajanagar	Dhruba Charan Sahoo	Biju Janata Dal	
Kendrapara	100	Mahakalapada	Durga Prasan Nayak	Bharatiya Janata Party	
Jagatsinghpur	101	Paradeep	Sampad Chandra Swain	Bharatiya Janata Party	Minister of State (I/C)
Jagatsinghpur	102	Tirtol (SC)	Ramakanta Bhoi	Biju Janata Dal	Suspended from Party for cross voting in 2026 RS election
Jagatsinghpur	103	Balikuda-Erasama	Sarada Prasanna Jena	Biju Janata Dal	
Jagatsinghpur	104	Jagatsinghpur	Amarendra Das	Bharatiya Janata Party	
Puri	105	Kakatpur (SC)	Tusharkanti Behera	Biju Janata Dal	
Puri	106	Nimapara	Pravati Parida	Bharatiya Janata Party	Deputy Chief Minister
Puri	107	Puri	Sunil Kumar Mohanty	Biju Janata Dal	
Puri	108	Brahmagiri	Upasna Mohapatra	Bharatiya Janata Party	
Puri	109	Satyabadi	Om Prakash Mishra	Bharatiya Janata Party	
Puri	110	Pipili	Ashrit Pattanayak	Bharatiya Janata Party	
Khordha	111	Jayadev (SC)	Naba Kishor Mallick	Biju Janata Dal	Suspended from Party for cross voting in 2026 RS election
Khordha	112	Bhubaneswar Central	Ananta Narayan Jena	Biju Janata Dal	
Khordha	113	Bhubaneswar North	Susant Kumar Rout	Biju Janata Dal	
Khordha	114	Ekamra Bhubaneswar	Babu Singh	Bharatiya Janata Party	
Khordha	115	Jatani	Bibhuti Bhusan Balabantaray	Biju Janata Dal	
Khordha	116	Begunia	Pradip Kumar Sahu	Biju Janata Dal	
Khordha	117	Khurda	Prasanta Kumar Jagadev	Bharatiya Janata Party	
Khordha	118	Chilika	Prithviraj Harichandan	Bharatiya Janata Party	Cabinet Minister
Nayagarh	119	Ranpur	Surama Padhy	Bharatiya Janata Party	Speaker
Nayagarh	120	Khandapada	Dusmanta Kumar Swain	Bharatiya Janata Party	
Nayagarh	121	Daspalla (SC)	Ramesh Chandra Behera	Biju Janata Dal	
Nayagarh	122	Nayagarh	Arun Kumar Sahoo	Biju Janata Dal	
Ganjam	123	Bhanjanagar	Pradyumna Kumar Nayak	Bharatiya Janata Party	
Ganjam	124	Polasara	Gokula Nanda Mallik	Bharatiya Janata Party	Minister of State (I/C)
Ganjam	125	Kabisuryanagar	Pratap Chandra Nayak	Bharatiya Janata Party	
Ganjam	126	Khalikote (SC)	Purna Chandra Sethy	Bharatiya Janata Party	
Ganjam	127	Chhatrapur (SC)	Krushna Chandra Nayak	Bharatiya Janata Party	
Ganjam	128	Aska	Saroj Kumar Padhi	Bharatiya Janata Party	
Ganjam	129	Surada	Nilamani Bisoyi	Bharatiya Janata Party	
Ganjam	130	Sanakhemundi	Ramesh Chandra Jena	Indian National Congress	Suspended from Party for cross voting in 2026 RS election
Ganjam	131	Hinjili	Naveen Patnaik	Biju Janata Dal	Leader of Opposition
Ganjam	132	Gopalpur	Bibhuti Bhushan Jena	Bharatiya Janata Party	Cabinet Minister
Ganjam	133	Berhampur	K. Anil Kumar	Bharatiya Janata Party	
Ganjam	134	Digapahandi	Sidhant Mohapatra	Bharatiya Janata Party	
Ganjam	135	Chikiti	Manoranjan Dyan Samantara	Bharatiya Janata Party	
Gajapati	136	Mohana (ST)	Dasarathi Gomango	Indian National Congress	Suspended from Party for cross voting in 2026 RS election
Gajapati	137	Paralakhemundi	Rupesh Kumar Panigrahi	Biju Janata Dal	
Rayagada	138	Gunupur (ST)	Satyajeet Gomango	Indian National Congress	
Rayagada	139	Bissam Cuttack (ST)	Nilamadhab Hikaka	Indian National Congress	
Rayagada	140	Rayagada (ST)	Kadraka Appala Swamy	Indian National Congress	
Koraput	141	Lakshmipur (ST)	Pabitra Saunta	Indian National Congress	
Koraput	142	Kotpad (ST)	Rupu Bhatra	Bharatiya Janata Party	
Koraput	143	Jeypore	Tara Prasad Bahinipati	Indian National Congress	
Koraput	144	Koraput (SC)	Raghuram Machha	Bharatiya Janata Party	
Koraput	145	Pottangi (ST)	Rama Chandra Kadam	Indian National Congress	Leader of Congress Legislature Party
Malkangiri	146	Malkangiri (ST)	Narasinga Madkami	Bharatiya Janata Party	
Malkangiri	147	Chitrakonda (ST)	Mangu Khilla	Indian National Congress	

== Bypolls ==
Date	Constituency		Previous MLA		Reason	Elected MLA	
11 November 2025	71	Nuapada	Rajendra Dholakia	Biju Janata Dal	Died on 8 September 2025	Jay Dholakia	Bharatiya Janata Party

== See also ==
- 2024 Odisha Legislative Assembly election
- Odisha Legislative Assembly
- List of constituencies of the Odisha Legislative Assembly
- Government of Odisha
- List of governors of Odisha
- List of chief ministers of Odisha
