= Government of Odisha =

State government of Odisha, India

Government of Odisha ଓଡ଼ିଶା ସରକାର
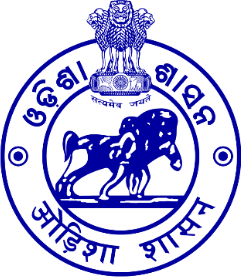
- Emblem of Odisha

- Flag of India
- Formation: 1 April 1936; 90 years ago (Utkal Dibas)
- Country: Republic of India
- Constitution: Constitution of India
- Website: www.odisha.gov.in
- Seat of Government: Lok Seva Bhavan, Bhubaneswar

Legislative Branch
- Legislature: Odisha Legislature
- Legislature Type: Unicameral
- House: Odisha Legislative Assembly (ଓଡ଼ିଶା ବିଧାନ ସଭା)
- Speaker of the House: Surama Padhy, BJP
- Deputy Speaker: Bhabani Shankar Bhoi, BJP
- Leader of the House: Mohan Charan Majhi, BJP (Chief Minister)
- Deputy Leaders of the House: Kanak Vardhan Singh Deo, BJP; Pravati Parida, BJP (Deputy Chief Ministers)
- Leader of the Opposition: Naveen Patnaik, BJD
- Members in Assembly: 147
- Meeting Place: Odisha Bidhan Soudha, Bhubaneswar

Executive Branch
- Governor (Head of State): Braj Mohan Ram (Appointed by the President of India)
- Chief Minister (Head of Government): Mohan Charan Majhi, BJP
- Deputy Chief Minister(s) (Deputy Heads of Government): Kanak Vardhan Singh Deo, BJP; Pravati Parida, BJP
- Chief Secretary (Head of Civil Service): Anu Garg, IAS
- Director General (Head of Police Service): Shri Vinaytosh Mishra, IPS
- Advocate General (Chief Legal Advisor): Pitambar Acharya
- State Cabinet: State Council of Ministers
- Cabinet Appointer: Governor of Odisha
- Government Departments: 40 Departments
- Current Composition of the Council of Ministers: (Chief Minister: 1); (Deputy Chief Ministers: 2); (Cabinet Ministers: 8); (Ministers of State: 5); Total Members = 16
- Meeting Place: Lok Seva Bhavan, Bhubaneswar
- Responsible to: Odisha Legislative Assembly
- State Budget: ₹310,000 crore (US$33 billion) (FY 2026–27)

Judiciary Branch
- High Court: Orissa High Court
- Chief Justice: Bibhu Prasad Routray (acting)
- Appointed by: President of India (in consultation with the CJI and Governor)
- Court Seat: Kataka
- Territorial Jurisdiction: Odisha
- Sanctioned Judge Strength: 33 (24 Permanent, 9 Additional)

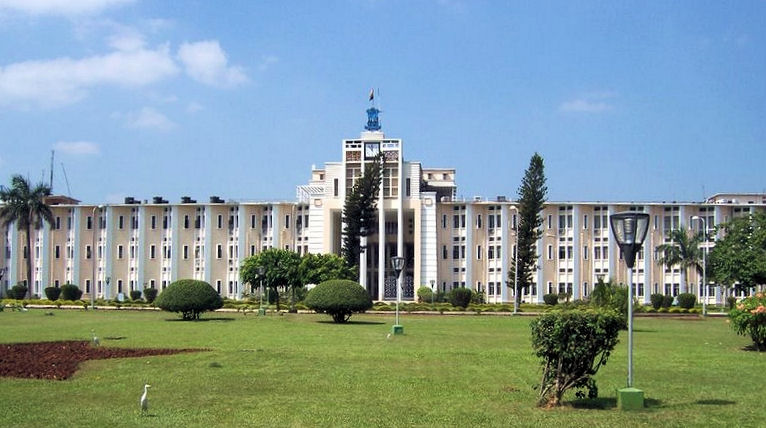
Lok Seva Bhavan (Secretariat of Odisha), Bhubaneswar

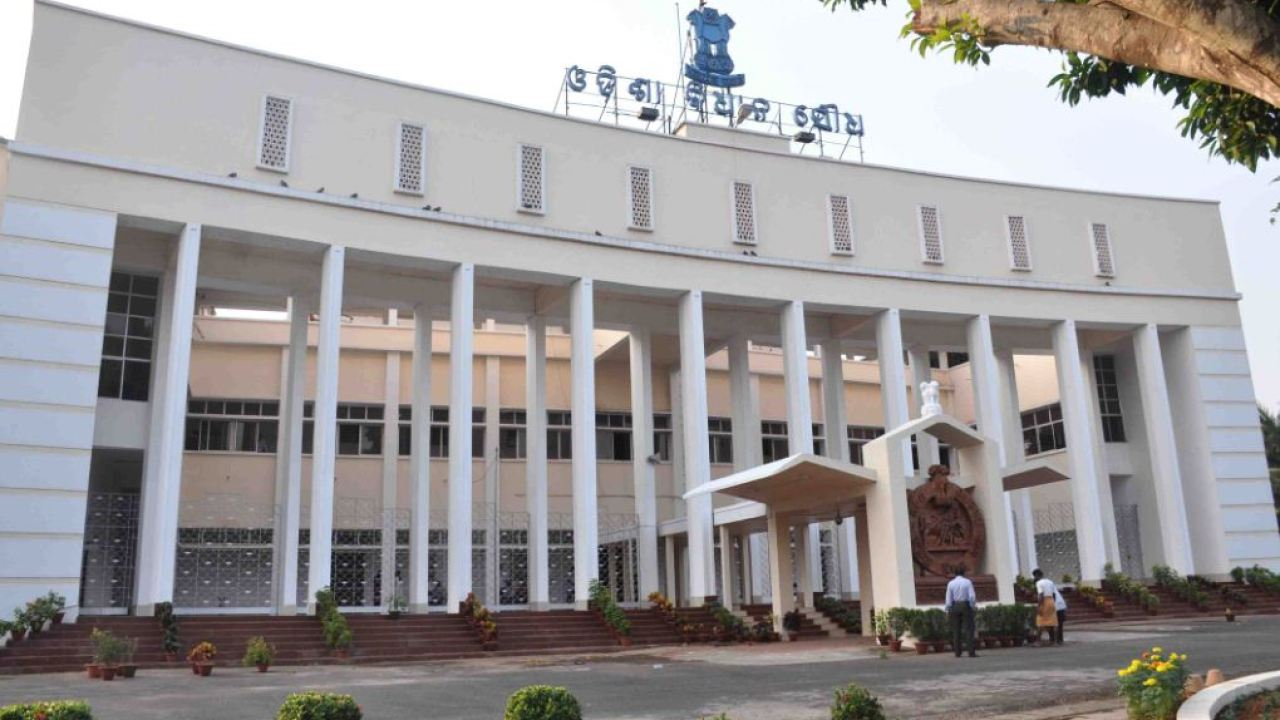
Odisha Bidhana Soudha, Bhubaneswar

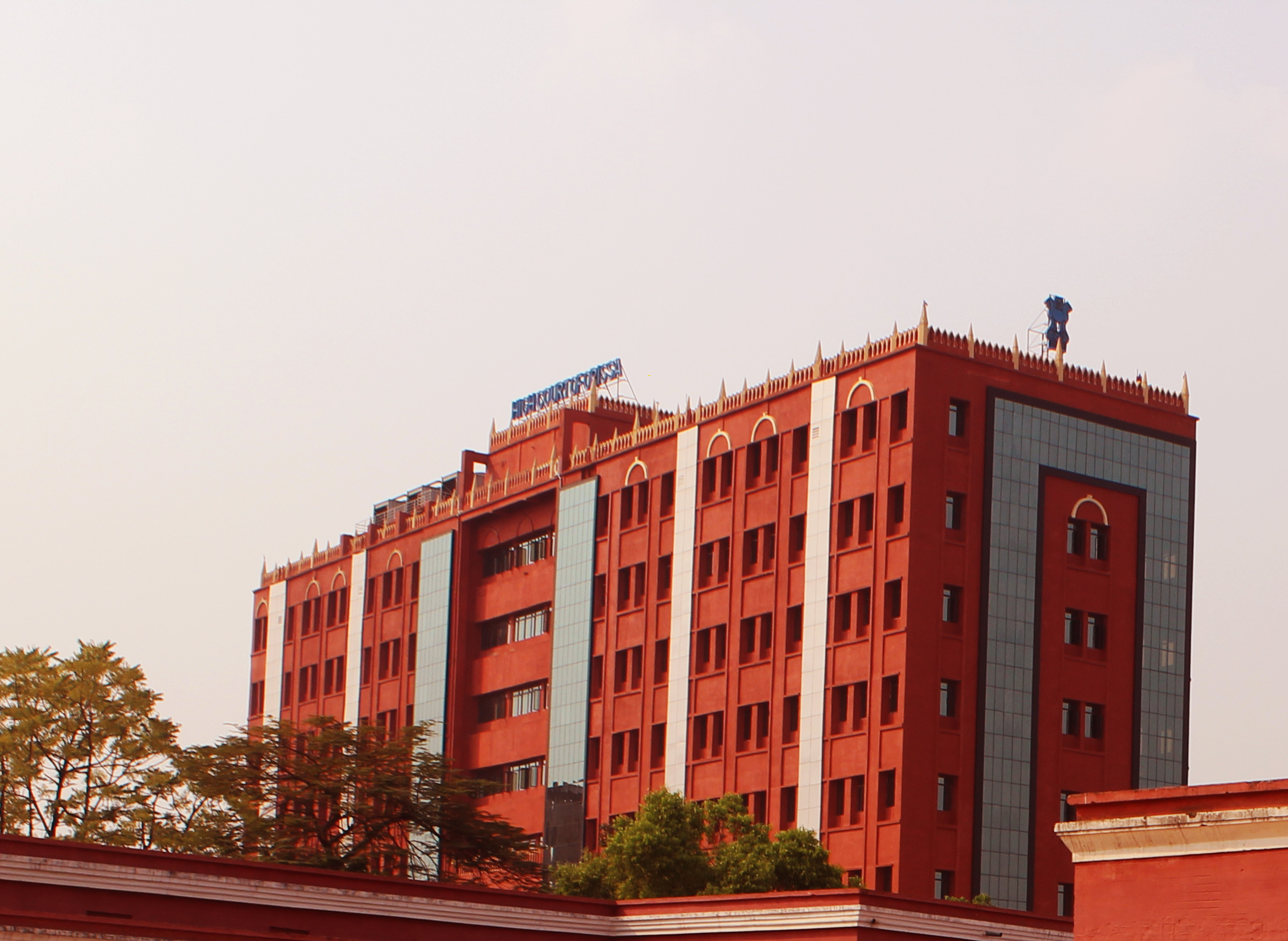
Orissa High Court, Kataka

The Government of Odisha, abbreviated as GoO ([oɽiʃa sɔɾɔkaɾɔ], Odia: ଓଡ଼ିଶା ସରକାର), is the principal administrative authority and state government of the Indian state of Odisha. Created by the Constitution of India, the state government is a democratically elected body consisting of three primary branches: the executive, the legislative, and the judiciary.

Under the Constitution of India, the de jure nominal head of state is the Governor of Odisha, who is appointed by the President of India on the advice of the Union Cabinet and holds a largely ceremonial role. The de facto executive authority is vested in the Chief Minister, who serves as the head of government, alongside their Council of Ministers. Following elections to the state legislature, the Governor usually invites the party or coalition with a majority to form the government. Functioning under a fusion of powers, the Council of Ministers is collectively responsible to the legislative assembly; they make statements in the assembly and take questions from its members. The executive branch operates primarily from the Lok Seva Bhavan (formerly the State Secretariat) in Bhubaneswar, the capital city. The state's legal interests are represented by the Advocate General, who serves as the chief legal advisor to the government.

The Odisha Legislature is unicameral, consisting solely of the Odisha Legislative Assembly (Vidhan Sabha). It comprises 147 Members of the Legislative Assembly (MLAs) directly elected by the people. The assembly convenes at the Vidhan Sabha Bhavan in Bhubaneswar. Its standard term is five years, unless dissolved earlier by the Governor following a successful vote of no confidence or a recommendation by the Chief Minister.

The state's highest judicial authority is the Orissa High Court, which is geographically separated from the capital and located in the historic city of Kataka. It exercises supreme appellate and original jurisdiction over the entire state. The court is presided over by the Chief Justice of Odisha, alongside a sanctioned strength of 33 judges. The Chief Justice is appointed by the President of India in consultation with the Chief Justice of India and the Governor of Odisha.

Odisha is administratively divided into 30 districts grouped under 3 administrative Revenue Divisions (Central, Northern, and Southern). At the national level, the state is represented in the Parliament of India by 21 Members of Parliament in the Lok Sabha (Lower House) and 10 Members of Parliament in the Rajya Sabha (Upper House). Members of the Lok Sabha are elected directly in general elections, while Members of the Rajya Sabha are indirectly elected by the Members of the Legislative Assembly through their respective political parties.

== Council of Ministers ==
Council of Ministers of the Majhi Ministry
Portrait	Minister Constituency	Portfolio	Took office	Left office	Party
Chief Minister
Mohan Charan Majhi	Mohan Charan Majhi; Kendujhar	Home; General Administration and Public Grievance; Finance; Information and Public Relations; Water Resources; Planning and Convergence; Other departments not allocated to any minister	12 June 2024	Incumbent	BJP
Deputy Chief Ministers
Kanak Vardhan Singh Deo	Kanak Vardhan Singh Deo; Patnagad	Agriculture and Farmers' Empowerment; Energy	12 June 2024	Incumbent	BJP
Pravati Parida	Pravati Parida; Nimapada	Women and Child Development; Mission Shakti; Tourism	12 June 2024	Incumbent	BJP
Cabinet Ministers
Suresh Pujari	Suresh Pujari; Brajarajnagar	Revenue and Disaster Management	12 June 2024	Incumbent	BJP
Rabi Narayan Naik	Rabi Narayan Naik; Kuchinda	Rural Development; Panchayati Raj and Drinking Water	12 June 2024	Incumbent	BJP
Nityananda Gond	Nityananda Gond; Umarkot	School and Mass Education; Scheduled Tribes and Scheduled Castes Development, Minorities and Backward Classes Welfare; Social Security and Empowerment of Persons with Disabilities	12 June 2024	Incumbent	BJP
Krushna Chandra Patra	Krushna Chandra Patra; Dhenkanal	Food Supplies and Consumer Welfare; Science and Technology	12 June 2024	Incumbent	BJP
Prithviraj Harichandan	Prithviraj Harichandan; Chilika	Law; Works; Excise	12 June 2024	Incumbent	BJP
Mukesh Mahaling	Mukesh Mahaling; Loisingha	Health and Family Welfare; Parliamentary Affairs; Electronics and Information Technology	12 June 2024	Incumbent	BJP
Bibhuti Bhusan Jena	Bibhuti Bhusan Jena; Gopalpur	Commerce and Transport; Steel and Mines	12 June 2024	Incumbent	BJP
Krushna Chandra Mahapatra	Krushna Chandra Mohapatra; Morada	Housing and Urban Development; Public Enterprises	12 June 2024	Incumbent	BJP
Ministers of State (Independent Charge)
Ganesh Ram Singh Khuntia	Ganesh Ram Singh Khuntia; Jashipur	Forest, Environment and Climate Change; Labour and Employees' State Insurance	12 June 2024	Incumbent	BJP
Suryabanshi Suraj	Suryabanshi Suraj; Dhamnagar	Higher Education; Sports and Youth Services; Odia Language, Literature and Culture	12 June 2024	Incumbent	BJP
Pradeep Bal Samanta	Pradeep Bal Samanta; Sukinda	Co-operation; Handlooms, Textiles and Handicrafts	12 June 2024	Incumbent	BJP
Gokula Nanda Mallik	Gokula Nanda Mallik; Polasara	Fisheries and Animal Resources Development; Micro, Small and Medium Enterprises	12 June 2024	Incumbent	BJP
Sampad Chandra Swain	Sampad Chandra Swain; Paradeep	Industries; Skill Development and Technical Education	12 June 2024	Incumbent	BJP

== See also ==
- Green card scheme in Odisha
- Invest Odisha
- Legislative Assembly of Odisha
- List of constituencies of Odisha Vidhan Sabha
- Make in Odisha
