= Nuapada Assembly constituency =

Constituency of the Odisha legislative assembly in India

Coordinates: 20.81°N 82.53°E

Nuapada ନୂଆପଡ଼ା
- Constituency No. 71 for the Odisha Legislative Assembly

Constituency details
- Country: India
- Region: East India
- State: Odisha
- Division: Southern Division
- District: Nuapada
- Lok Sabha constituency: Kalahandi
- Established: 1951
- Total electors: 2,43,514 (Note: as on 2024) (Note: as data published by election commission)
- Reservation: None

Member of Legislative Assembly
- 17th Odisha Legislative Assembly
- Incumbent Jay Dholakia
- Party: Bharatiya Janata Party
- Elected year: 2025

Nuapada is a Bidhana Sabha constituency of Nuapada district, in Odisha.

This constituency includes Khariar Road, Nuapada block and Komna block.

== Elected members ==
Vote share of winning candidates
2025(bypoll)	58.27%
2024	33.65%
2019	39.75%
2014	36.46%
2009	41.62%
2004	36.86%
2000	57.34%
1997 (bypoll)	38.51%
1995	46.49%
1990	64.83%
1985	49.65%
1980	48.35%
1977	59.08%

Since its formation in 1951, 19 elections were held till date including two bypolls in 1997 & 2025. It was a 2-member constituency for 1952 & 1957.

List of members elected from Nuapada constituency are:

Year	Member	Party
1951 (Note: It was a 2 member constituency)	Anupa Singh Deo	Indian National Congress
1951	Chaitan Majhi	Indian National Congress
1957 (Note: It was a 2 member constituency)	Anupa Singh Deo	Indian National Congress
1957	Ghasiram Majhi	Indian National Congress
1961	Ghasiram Majhi	Swatantra Party
1967	Onkar Singh	Indian National Congress
1971	Ghasiram Majhi	Swatantra Party
1974	Jagannath Patnaik	Indian National Congress
1977	Ghasiram Majhi	Janata Party
1980	Bhanu Prakash Joshi	Indian National Congress (I)
1985	Ghasiram Majhi	Janata Dal
1990	Ghasiram Majhi	Janata Dal
1995	Ghasiram Majhi	Janata Dal
1997^ (Note: Death of Ghasiram Majhi)	Jagannath Patnaik	Indian National Congress
2000	Basanta Kumar Panda	Bharatiya Janata Party
2004	Rajendra Dholakia	Independent politician
2009	Rajendra Dholakia	Biju Janata Dal
2014	Basanta Kumar Panda	Bharatiya Janata Party
2019	Rajendra Dholakia	Biju Janata Dal
2024	Rajendra Dholakia	Biju Janata Dal
2025^ (Note: Death of Rajendra Dholakia)	Jay Dholakia	Bharatiya Janata Party

^By-election

== Election results ==
=== 2025 by-election ===
Elected BJD MLA Shri Rajendra Dholakia died in September 2025. This was the first bypoll after BJP led by Mohan Majhi came in to power in 2024, thus reflecting its crucial nature.

Election was announced on 6 October 2025. Voting was held on 11 November 2025. Counting of votes was on 14 November 2025. BJP candidate Jay Dholakia won the election by a huge margin.

Odisha Legislative Assembly by-election, 2025: Nuapada
Party	Candidate	Votes	%	±%
BJP	Jay Dholakia	123,869	58.27	▲33.88
INC	Ghasi Ram Majhi	40,121	18.87	▲10.43
BJD	Snehangini Chhuria	38,408	18.07	▼15.58
NOTA	None of the above	2,248	1.06	▼0.19
Majority		83,748	39.40	▲33.48
Turnout		2,12,667	83.49	▲
BJP gain from BJD		Swing		

=== 2024 ===
In 2024 election, Biju Janata Dal candidate Rajendra Dholakia defeated Independent candidate Ghasi Ram Majhi by a margin of 10,881 votes.

2024 Vidhan Sabha Election, Nuapada
Party	Candidate	Votes	%	±%
BJD	Rajendra Dholakia	61,822	33.65	▼6.10
Independent	Ghasi Ram Majhi	50,941	27.73	New
BJP	Abhinandan Panda	44,814	24.39	▲6.53
INC	Sarat Pattanayak	15,501	8.44	▼19.00
NOTA	None of the above	2,291	1.25	▲0.35
Majority		10,881	5.92	▼6.39
Turnout		1,83,703	75.44	
BJD hold				

=== 2019 ===
In 2019 election, Biju Janata Dal candidate Rajendra Dholakia defeated Indian National Congress candidate Ghasi Ram Majhi by a margin of 20,330 votes.

2019 Vidhan Sabha Election, Nuapada
Party	Candidate	Votes	%	±%
BJD	Rajendra Dholakia	65,647	39.75	▲9.75
INC	Ghasi Ram Majhi	45,317	27.44	▲1.54
BJP	Home Singh Majhi	29,490	17.86	▼18.6
NOTA	None of the above	1,489	0.9	
Majority		20,330	12.31	
Turnout		1,65.141	73.71	
BJD gain from BJP				

=== 2014 ===
In 2014 election, Bharatiya Janata Party candidate Basanta Kumar Panda defeated Biju Janata Dal candidate Rajendra Dholakia by a margin of 9,610 votes.

2014 Vidhan Sabha Election, Nuapada
Party	Candidate	Votes	%	±%
BJP	Basanta Kumar Panda	55,817	36.46	▲11.39
BJD	Rajendra Dholakia	46,207	30.18	▼11.44
INC	Ghasi Ram Majhi	39,654	25.90	▲9.47
NOTA	None of the above	2,426	1.58	−
Majority		9,610	6.27	−
Turnout		1,53,095	74.4	5.15
Registered electors		2,05,761		
BJP gain from BJD				

=== 2009 ===
In 2009 election, Biju Janata Dal candidate Rajendra Dholakia defeated Bharatiya Janata Party candidate Basanta Kumar Panda by a margin of 22,620 votes.

2009 Vidhan Sabha Election, Nuapada
Party	Candidate	Votes	%	±%
BJD	Rajendra Dholakia	56,874	41.62	−
BJP	Basanta Kumar Panda	34,254	25.07	−
INC	Saroj Kumar Sahu	22,450	16.43	−
Majority		22,620	16.55 (Note: % of total valid votes)	−
Turnout		1,36,656	69.25	
BJD gain from Independent				
