= Odia film policy =

In 2019, the state government decided to subsidies up to Rs 2.5 crore to filmmakers of English, Hindi or other language films that would promote Odisha and its culture, heritage and tourist destinations in their films. The decision was taken to encourage the filmmakers to shoot films in Odisha. To enhance the ease of filming and facilitate the development of related institutions, the Odisha State Film Policy 2019, proposed to implement a single window approval process for shooting of films in the state. It was proposed that all proposals for film cities, multiplexes and cinema halls will be facilitated through the government's single window for investors facilitation and tracking portal.

Odia films which convey "Aesthetic Excellence, high technical standards and Social relevance" up to two additional eligible films by the same filmmakers will be provided with a higher subsidy up to Rs 4 crore.

== Objectives ==
The key objectives of Odisha State Film Policy are :

- To promote quality Odia films.
- To facilitate film tourism in the state.
- To bring Odisha as a destination for film shooting.

== Support ==
- Single Window Approval Process for films shooting in Odisha will be provided.
- Investors will apply through GOSWIFT portal for approval and clearances.
- To encourage filmmakers to shoot in Odisha certain subsidy will be provided.

== Incentives ==
The following incentives will be provided for development of Film Cities, Cinema Halls & Multiplexes in Odisha:

- Capital investment subsidy
- Land allotment
- Interest Subsidy
- Stamp duty exemption
- Reimbursement of Land Conversion charges
- Reimbursement of SGST
- Exemption on electricity duty
- Environmental protection infrastructure subsidy
- Up gradation of screening infrastructure

== Movies Under This Policy ==
=== By Year ===
- 2019

== See also ==
- Make in Odisha
- Invest Odisha
