= Rajendra Dholakia =

Indian politician (1956–2025)

Member of Odisha Legislative Assembly
- In office 23 May 2019 – 8 September 2025
- Preceded by: Basanta Kumar Panda
- Succeeded by: Jay Dholakia
- Constituency: Nuapada
- In office 16 May 2004 – 16 May 2014
- Preceded by: Basanta Kumar Panda
- Succeeded by: Basanta Kumar Panda
- Constituency: Nuapada

Minister of Planning & Convergence Government of Odisha
- In office 5 June 2022 – 11 June 2024
- Chief Minister: Naveen Patnaik
- Preceded by: Padmanabha Behera
- Succeeded by: Mohan Charan Majhi

Personal details
- Born: 20 November 1956 Khariar Road, Orissa, India
- Died: 8 September 2025 (aged 68) Chennai, Tamil Nadu, India
- Party: Biju Janata Dal
- Spouse: Kalpana Dholakia
- Children: Jay Dholakia
- Education: Sambalpur University
- Profession: Politician, social worker

Rajendra Dholakia (20 November 1956 – 8 September 2025) was an Indian politician from Odisha. He was a member of Odisha Legislative Assembly representing Nuapada as a former Cabinet Minister Government of Odisha and Member of the Biju Janata Dal. Dholakia died from complications of a heart transplant on 8 September 2025, at the age of 68.

== Political career ==
Dholakia was a Member of the Odisha Legislative Assembly from Nuapada constituency in Nuapada district. He was four times MLA from Nuapada constituency. He was first elected to Odisha Legislative Assembly in 2004 as an independent candidate after that joined Biju Janta Dal then again won the 2009 election, lost of the 2014 election defferent to Basanta Kumar Panda after that won 2019 and 2024 election.

Electoral history of Dholakia
Election	House	Constituency	Votes	%	Result	Party
2024	Odisha Legislative Assembly	Nuapada	61,822	33.65	Won	BJD
2019	Odisha Legislative Assembly	Nuapada	65,647	39.75	Won	BJD
2014	Odisha Legislative Assembly	Nuapada	55,817	36.46	Lost	BJD
2009	Odisha Legislative Assembly	Nuapada	56,874	41.62	Won	BJD
2004	Odisha Legislative Assembly	Nuapada	41,678	36.86	Won	IND

== See also ==
- 2019 Odisha Legislative Assembly election
- Odisha Legislative Assembly
