= Jogendra Naik =

Indian politician

Member of Odisha Legislative Assembly
- In office 1995–2000
- Preceded by: Chhotaray Majhi
- Succeeded by: Mohan Charan Majhi
- Constituency: Keonjhar (ST)
- In office 1980–1985
- Preceded by: Kumar Majhi
- Succeeded by: Chhotaray Majhi
- Constituency: Keonjhar (ST)

Personal details
- Born: 11 May 1947
- Died: 8 January 2006 (aged 58)
- Political party: Bharatiya Janata Party
- Spouse: Manoj Manjari Devi
- Children: 1 son, 1 daughter
- Parent: Daitari Naik (father)

Jogendra Naik was an Indian politician from Odisha who had served as MLA of Keonjhar Assembly constituency twice - 1980 & 1995. He was elected to Odisha Legislative Assembly from Keonjhar Assembly constituency on a Congress ticket in 1980 and on a BJP ticket in 1995. Naik was denied a ticket in 2000 Odisha Legislative Assembly election in favor of Mohan Charan Majhi, the incumbent Chief Minister of Odisha.
