= Snehangini Chhuria =

Indian politician

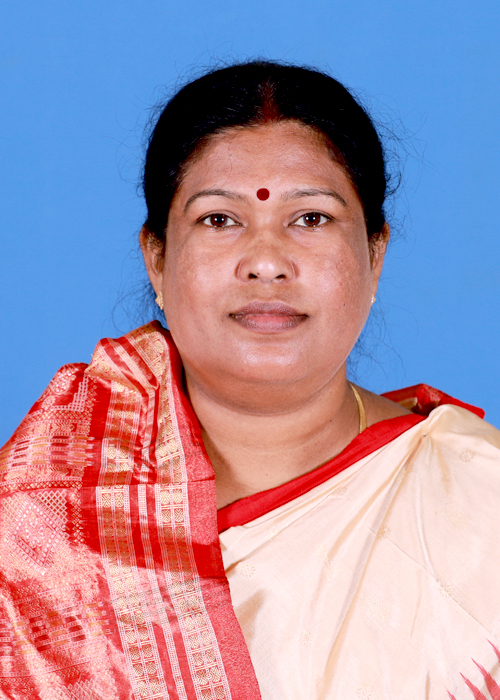

President of Biju Mahila Janata Dal
- Incumbent
- Assumed office 31 December 2020
- President: Naveen Patnaik

Member of Odisha Legislative Assembly
- In office 2014–2024
- Preceded by: Nihar Mahanand
- Succeeded by: Nihar Mahanand
- Constituency: Attabira

Minister of State (Independent Charge) for Cooperation, Handloom and Textiles, Government of Odisha
- In office 20 May 2014 – 28 May 2019
- Chief Minister: Naveen Patnaik

Personal details
- Born: 9 December 1968 (age 57) Attabira, Odisha, India
- Party: Biju Janta Dal
- Spouse: Durga Prasad Chhuria
- Education: Sambalpur University
- Profession: Politician

Snehangini Chhuria is an Indian politician. She was elected to the Odisha Legislative Assembly from Attabira as a member of the Biju Janata Dal.
