= Soro Assembly constituency =

Constituency of the Odisha legislative assembly in India

Coordinates: 21.28°N 86.69°E

Soro
- Constituency No. 41 for the Odisha Legislative Assembly

Constituency details
- Country: India
- Region: East India
- State: Odisha
- Division: Central Division
- District: Balasore
- Lok Sabha constituency: Bhadrak
- Established: 1951
- Total electors: 2,28,076 (Note: as on 2024) (Note: as data published by election commission)
- Reservation: SC

Member of Legislative Assembly
- 17th Odisha Legislative Assembly
- Incumbent Madhab Dhada
- Party: Biju Janata Dal
- Elected year: 2024

Soro (Sl. No.: 41) is a Vidhan Sabha constituency of Balasore district, Odisha.

This constituency includes Soro, Soro block and 16 GPs (Anji, Aruhabad, Avana, Bahanaga, Baripada, Bishnupur, Chittol, Dandaharipur, Gopalpur, Kalyani, Kharsahapur, Kochiakoili, Kuruda, Sahaspura, Saud and Talakurunia) of Bahanaga block.

== Elected members ==
Vote share of winning candidates
2024	39.07%
2019	35.70%
2014	41.95%
2009	43.19%
2004	48.95%
2000	56.56%
1996 (bypoll)	57.24%
1995	62.57%
1990	48.33%
1985	72.82%
1980	42.37%
1977	65.03%

Since its formation in 1951, 18 elections were held till date including one bypoll in 1996. It was a 2 member constituency for 1957.

List of members elected from Soro constituency are:

Year	Member	Party
2024	Madhab Dhada	Biju Janata Dal
2019	Parshuram Dhada	Biju Janata Dal
2014	Parshuram Dhada	Biju Janata Dal
2009	Surendra Prasad Pramanik	Indian National Congress
2004	Kartik Mohapatra	Indian National Congress
2000	Kartik Mohapatra	Indian National Congress
1996 (bypoll) (Note: Resignation of Kartik Mahapatra on his election to Lok Sabha)	Indurani Mohapatra	Indian National Congress
1995	Kartik Mohapatra	Indian National Congress
1990	Kartik Mohapatra	Janata Dal
1985	Jadunath Das Mohapatra	Indian National Congress
1980	Pitamber Panda	Communist Party of India
1977	Haraprasad Mahapatra	Janata Party
1974	Jadunath Das Mohapatra	Indian National Congress
1971	Jadunath Das Mohapatra	Utkal Congress
1967	Haraprasad Mahapatra	Swatantra Party
1961	Karunakar Panigrahi	Indian National Congress
1957 (Note: It was a 2 member constituency)	Chaitanya Prasad Sethi	Indian National Congress
1957	Harekrushna Mahatab	Indian National Congress
1951	Nanda kishore Das	Indian National Congress

== Election results ==
=== 2024 ===
Voting were held on 1st June 2024 in 4th phase of Odisha Assembly Election & 7th phase of Indian General Election. Counting of votes was on 4th June 2024. In 2024 election, Biju Janata Dal candidate Madhab Dhada defeated Bharatiya Janata Party candidate Parshuram Dhada by a margin of 802 votes.

2024 Odisha Vidhan Sabha Election,Soro
Party	Candidate	Votes	%	±%
BJD	Madhab Dhada	63,642	39.07	▲3.37
BJP	Parshuram Dhada	62,840	38.57	▲6.09
INC	Subrat Dhada	32,149	19.73	▼10.92
NOTA	None of the above	650	0.40	▲0.02
Majority		802	0.5	
Turnout		1,62,905	71.43	
BJD hold				

=== 2019 ===
In 2019 election, Biju Janata Dal candidate Parshuram Dhada defeated Bharatiya Janata Party candidate Rakesh Kumar Malik by a margin of 4,936 votes.

2019 Odisha Vidhan Sabha Election,Soro
Party	Candidate	Votes	%	±%
BJD	Parshuram Dhada	54,775	35.7	
BJP	Rakesh Kumar Malik	49,839	32.48	
INC	Surendra Prasad Pramanik	47,036	30.65	
NOTA	None of the above	588	0.38	
Majority		4,936	3.22	
Turnout		1,53,440	70.54	
BJD hold				

=== 2014 ===
In 2014 election, Biju Janata Dal candidate Parshuram Dhada defeated Indian National Congress candidate Mrutyunjay Jena by a margin of 4,911 votes.

2014 Odisha Legislative Assembly election: Soro
Party	Candidate	Votes	%	±%
BJD	Parshuram Dhada	57,319	41.95	−
INC	Mrutyunjay Jena	52,408	38.36	▼4.83
BJP	Rakesh Kumar Malik	23,217	16.99	▼25.89
NOTA	None of the above	812	0.59	−
Majority		4,911	3.59	3.28
Turnout		1,36,628	70.99	7.17
Registered electors		1,92,452		
BJD gain from INC				

=== 2009 ===
In 2009 election, Indian National Congress candidate Surendra Prasad Pramanik defeated Bharatiya Janata Party candidate Parshuram Dhada by a margin of 360 votes.

2009 Vidhan Sabha Election, Soro
Party	Candidate	Votes	%	±%
INC	Surendra Prasad Pramanik	50,159	43.19	−
BJP	Parshuram Dhada	49,799	42.88	−
CPI	Jayakrushna Mallik	11,318	9.75	−
Majority		360	0.31 (Note: % of total valid votes)	−
Turnout		1,16,172	63.82	−
INC hold				
