= Green card scheme in Odisha =

Green Card is a scheme introduced by the Government of Odisha with effect from 1983 to popularize permanent method of family planning for two children or fewer. Parents and children under Green Card Scheme are eligible for certain benefits all districts of the State. With a view to encourage people to accept sterilization operation voluntarily compensation for loss of wages is being paid to the beneficiaries as per pattern fixed by the Government of India from time to time. Government of India has started an Insurances scheme to cover the death, complication and failure cases of sterilization as well as indemnity cover of surgeons. An agreement has been signed by Government of India and Oriental Insurance Company Limited and the scheme has been implemented from November 2005 in all districts of the Odisha State.

This scheme was stopped on 9 November 2011. By the time it ended this scheme had been useful in providing various facilities to around 6,02,336 people.

== Facilities ==
- Homestead land was provided
- 5 per cent financial assistance to build house
- 5 per cent reservation on home loan for those belonging to lower and middle income groups
- Reservation for their children in technical education institutes
