= Gokula Nanda Mallik =

Indian politician

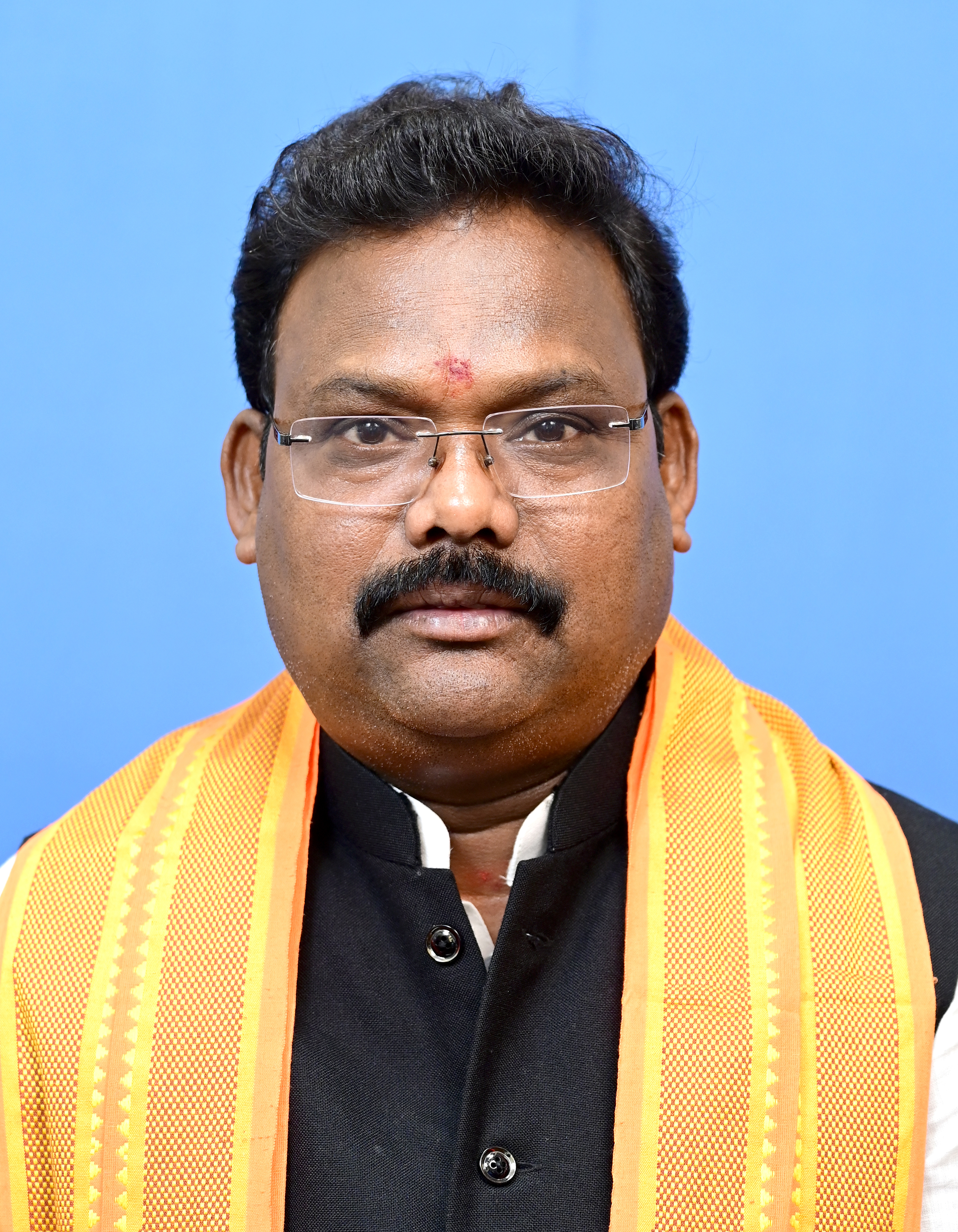

Minister of State (Independent Charge) for Minister of Fisheries and Animal Resources Development, Micro, Small and Medium Enterprises, Government of Odisha
- In office 12 June 2024 – Incumbent
- Chief Minister: Mohan Charan Majhi

Member of Odisha Legislative Assembly
- In office 4 June 2024 – Incumbent
- Preceded by: Srikanta Sah
- Constituency: Polasara

Personal details
- Party: Bharatiya Janata Party
- Parent: Ananta Mallik
- Education: Graduate +3 (Arts), Maharshi College of Natural Law
- Profession: Politician, Business

Gokula Nanda Mallik is an Indian politician and Minister of State (Independent Charge) for Minister of Fisheries and Animal Resources Development, Micro, Small and Medium Enterprises in Government of Odisha. He is a member of the Member of Odisha Legislative Assembly from Polasara assembly constituency of Ganjam district.

On 12 June 2024, he took oath along with Chief Minister Mohan Charan Majhi took oath in Janata Maidan, Bhubaneswar. Governor Raghubar Das administered their oath. Prime Minister Narendra Modi, Home Minister Amit Shah, Defense Minister Rajnath Singh, along with Chief Ministers of 10 BJP-ruled states were present.
