= Ganesh Ram Singh Khuntia =

Indian politician

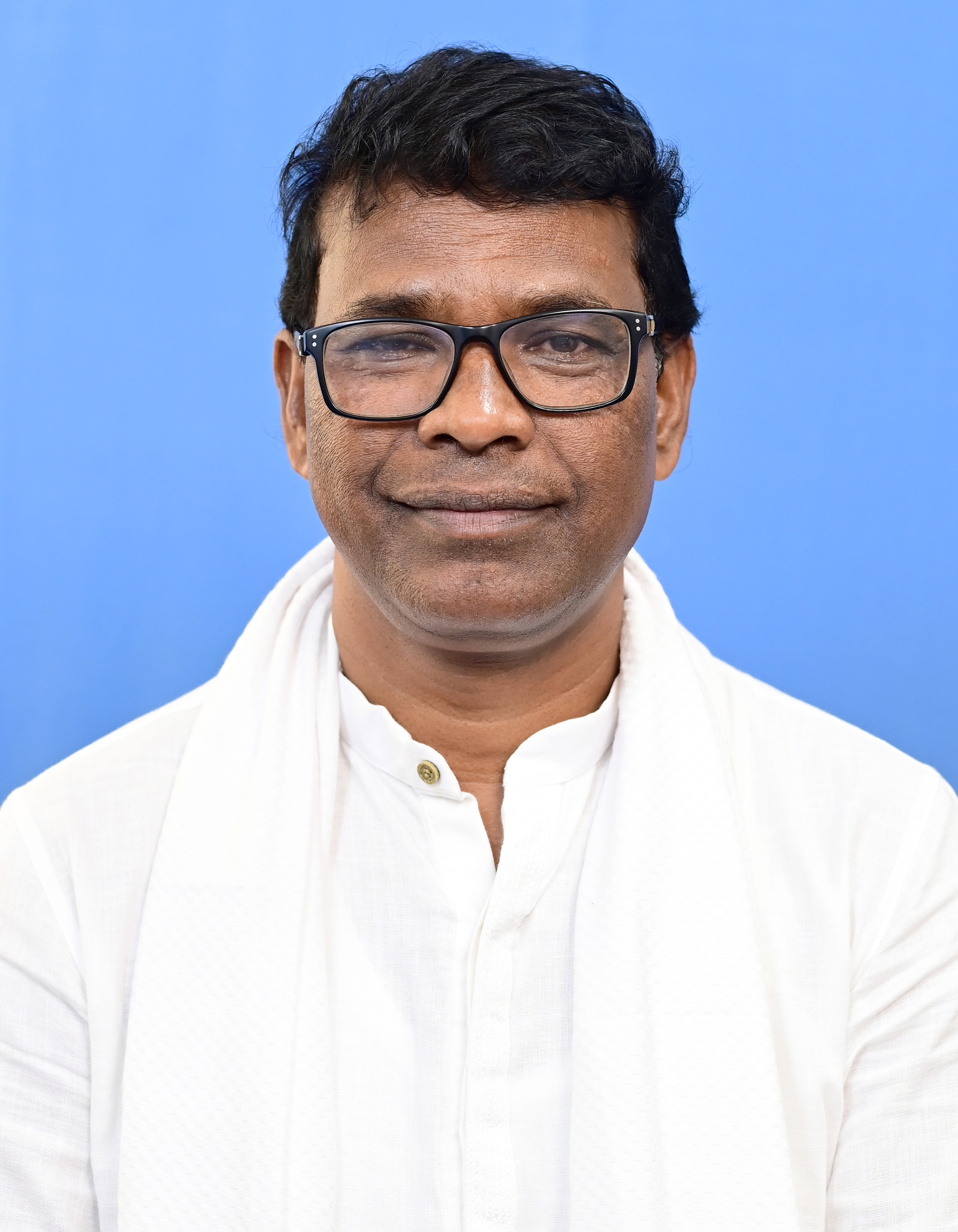
- Khuntia in 2024

Minister of Forest, Environment & Climate Change Government of Odisha
- Incumbent
- Assumed office 12 June 2024
- Chief Minister: Mohan Charan Majhi
- Preceded by: Pradip Kumar Amat

Minister of Labour & Employees' State Insurance Government of Odisha
- Incumbent
- Assumed office 12 June 2024
- Chief Minister: Mohan Charan Majhi
- Preceded by: Sarada Prasad Nayak

Member of the Odisha Legislative Assembly
- Incumbent
- Assumed office 2019
- Preceded by: Mangal Singh Mudi
- Constituency: Jashipur (ST)

Personal details
- Born: 10 April 1975 (age 50)
- Party: Bharatiya Janata Party
- Spouse: Muktamani Khuntia
- Children: 1 son
- Parent: Laxman Singh Khuntia (father)
- Profession: Politician, Agriculture and Social Work

Ganesh Ram Singh Khuntia is an Indian politician and Minister of State (Independent Charge) for Forest, Environment & Climate Change, Labour, Employees State Insurance in Government of Odisha. He is a member of the Member of Odisha Legislative Assembly from Jashipur assembly constituency of Mayurbhanj district.

He did his Diploma in Civil Engineering from Bhubanananda Odisha School of Engineering, Cuttack.

On 12 June 2024, he took oath along with Chief Minister Mohan Charan Majhi at Janata Maidan, Bhubaneswar. Governor Raghubar Das administered their oath. Prime Minister Narendra Modi, Home Minister Amit Shah, Defense Minister Rajnath Singh, along with Chief Ministers of 10 BJP-ruled states were present.
