= Attabira Assembly constituency =

Constituency of the Odisha legislative assembly in India

Coordinates: 21.37°N 83.78°E

Attabira
- Constituency No. 4 for the Odisha Legislative Assembly

Constituency details
- Country: India
- Region: East India
- State: Odisha
- Division: Northern Division
- District: Baragada
- Lok Sabha constituency: Bargarh
- Established: 1951
- Total electors: 2,24,933 (Note: as on 2024) (Note: as data published by election commission)
- Reservation: SC

Member of Legislative Assembly
- 17th Odisha Legislative Assembly
- Incumbent Nihar Ranjan Mahanand
- Party: Bharatiya Janata Party
- Elected year: 2024

Attabira is an Assembly constituency of Bargarh district in Odisha State. It was established in 1951. Constituency didn't existed in between 1967 & 2004. It was revived in 2008 Delimitation and went for polls in 2009 election. This constituency was created in 2009 in place of Melchhamunda Assembly constituency.

== Extent of Assembly Constituencies ==
- Attabira Block
- Bheden Block.

== Elected members ==
Vote share of winning candidates
2024	55.17%
2019	48.98%
2014	44.92%
2009	39.65%

Since its formation in 1951, 6 elections were held till date.

List of members elected from Attabira constituency are:

Year	Member	Party
1951	Bipin Bihari Das	Indian National Congress
1957-1960 : Constituency did not exist
1961	Banamali Babu	Indian National Congress
1967-2008 : See Melchhamunda
2009	Nihar Ranjan Mahanand	Indian National Congress
2014	Snehangini Chhuria	Biju Janata Dal
2019	Snehangini Chhuria	Biju Janata Dal
2024	Nihar Ranjan Mahanand	Bharatiya Janata Party

== Election results ==
=== 2024 ===
Voting were held on 20 May 2024 in 2nd phase of Odisha Assembly Election & 5th phase of Indian General Election. Counting of votes was on 4 June 2024. In 2024 election, Bharatiya Janata Party candidate Nihar Ranjan Mahanand defeated Biju Janata Dal candidate Snehangini Chhuria by a margin of 28,910 votes.

2024 Odisha Vidhan Sabha Election: Attabira
Party	Candidate	Votes	%	±%
BJP	Nihar Ranjan Mahanand	99,487	55.17	
BJD	Snehangini Chhuria	70,577	39.14	
INC	Abhishek Seth	6065	3.36	
NOTA	None of the above	1808	1	
Majority		28,910	16.03	
Turnout		1,80,319	80.17	
BJP gain from BJD				

=== 2019 ===
In 2019 election, Biju Janata Dal candidate Snehangini Chhuria defeated Indian Bharatiya Janata Party candidate Milan Seth by a margin of 22,396 votes.

2019 Odisha Vidhan Sabha Election: Attabira
Party	Candidate	Votes	%	±%
BJD	Snehangini Chhuria	84,010	48.98	▲4.06
BJP	Milan Seth	61614	35.92	▲14.15
INC	Nihar Ranjan Mahanand	21511	12.54	▼15.94
NOTA	None of the above	1639	0.96	−
Majority		22396	13.05	
Turnout		171527	77.45	
BJD hold				

=== 2014 ===
In 2014 election, Biju Janata Dal candidate Snehangini Chhuria defeated Indian National Congress candidate Nihar Ranjan Mahanand by a margin of 25,474 votes.

2014 Odisha Vidhan Sabha election: Attabira
Party	Candidate	Votes	%	±%
BJD	Snehangini Chhuria	69,602	44.92	▲15.97
INC	Nihar Ranjan Mahanand	44,128	28.48	▼11.17
BJP	Milan Seth	33,735	21.77	▲12.89
NOTA	None of the above	1,509	0.97	−
Majority		25,474	16.22	
Turnout		1,54,943	76.61	10.72
Registered electors		2,02,277		
BJD gain from INC				

=== 2009 ===
In 2009 election, Indian National Congress candidate Nihar Ranjan Mahanand defeated Biju Janata Dal candidate Snehangini Chhuria by 13,329 votes.

2009 Odisha Vidhan Sabha Election: Attabira
Party	Candidate	Votes	%	±%
INC	Nihar Ranjan Mahanand	49,396	39.65	−
BJD	Snehangini Chhuria	36,067	28.95	−
Independent	Milan Seth	16,308	13.09	−
BJP	Bipin Bhusagar	11,066	8.88	−
Majority		13,329	10.70 (Note: % of total valid votes)	
Turnout		1,24,620	65.89	
INC win (new seat)				
