= Talsara Assembly constituency =

Constituency of the Odisha legislative assembly in India

Coordinates: 22.36°N 84.10°E

Talsara
- Constituency No. 8 for the Odisha Legislative Assembly

Constituency details
- Country: India
- Region: East India
- State: Odisha
- Division: Northern Division
- District: Sundargarh
- Lok Sabha constituency: Sundargarh
- Established: 1961
- Total electors: 2,16,981 (Note: as on 2024) (Note: as data published by election commission)
- Reservation: ST

Member of Legislative Assembly
- 17th Odisha Legislative Assembly
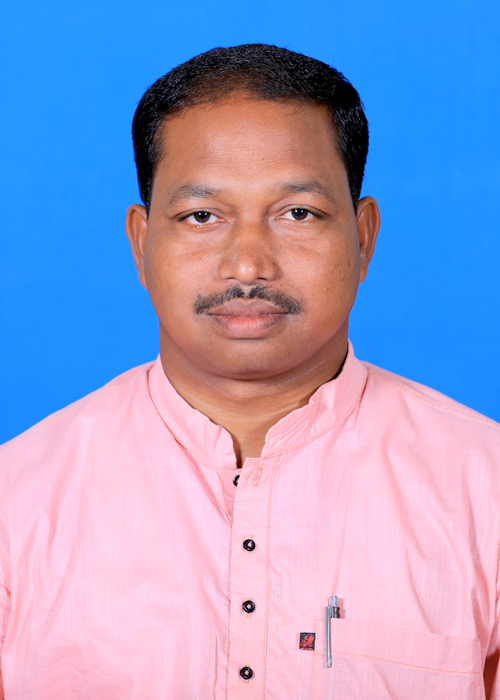
- Incumbent Bhabani Shankar Bhoi
- Party: Bharatiya Janata Party
- Elected year: 2024

Talsara is an Assembly constituency of Sundargarh district in Odisha State. It was established in 1961.

== Extent of Assembly Constituencies ==
- Subdega Block
- Balisankara Block
- Bargaon Block
- Lephripara Block : Alpaka, Dumabahal, Giringkela, Gundiadihi, Hurmei, Kulabira, Lephripara, Masabira, Rajbahal and Sarafgarh GPs.

== Elected members ==
Vote share of winning candidates
| 2024 | 42.67% |
| 2019 | 39.31% |
| 2014 | 32.86% |
| 2009 | 39.85% |
| 2006 (bypoll) | 44.84% |
| 2004 | 46.69% |
| 2000 | 49.95% |
| 1995 | 36.80% |
| 1990 | 57.18% |
| 1985 | 63.74% |
| 1980 | 57.13% |
| 1977 | 58.63% |

Since its formation in 1961, 15 elections have been held till date including one bypoll in 2006.

List of members elected from Talsara constituency are:

| Year | Member | Party |
|---|---|---|
| 2024 | Bhabani Shankar Bhoi | Bharatiya Janata Party |
| 2019 | Bhabani Shankar Bhoi | Bharatiya Janata Party |
| 2014 | Prafulla Majhi | Indian National Congress |
| 2009 | Prafulla Majhi | Indian National Congress |
| 2006 (bypoll) (Note: Death of Gajadhar Majhi) | Prafulla Majhi | Indian National Congress |
| 2004 | Gajadhar Majhi | Indian National Congress |
| 2000 | Gajadhar Majhi | Indian National Congress |
| 1995 | Gajadhar Majhi | Indian National Congress |
| 1990 | Ranjeet Bhitria | Janata Dal |
| 1985 | Gajadhar Majhi | Indian National Congress |
| 1980 | Gajadhar Majhi | Indian National Congress |
| 1977 | Ignace Majhi | Janata Party |
| 1974 | Premananda Kalo | Indian National Congress |
| 1971 | Gangadhar Pradhan | Swatantra Party |
| 1967 | Gangadhar Pradhan | Swatantra Party |
| 1961 | Gangadhar Pradhan | Swatantra Party |

== Election results ==
=== 2024 ===
Voting were held on 20th May 2024 in 2nd phase of Odisha Assembly Election & 5th phase of Indian General Election. Counting of votes was on 4th June 2024. In 2024 election, Bharatiya Janata Party candidate Bhabani Shankar Bhoi defeated Biju Janata Dal candidate Binay Kumar Toppo by a margin of 17,189 votes.

2024 Odisha Vidhan Sabha Election: Talsara
| Party | Candidate | Votes | % | ±% |
|---|---|---|---|---|
| BJP | Bhabani Shankar Bhoi | 68,928 | 42.67 | |
| BJD | Binay Kumar Toppo | 51,739 | 32.03 | |
| INC | Devendra Bhitaria | 35,262 | 21.83 | |
| NOTA | None of the above | 1885 | 1.17 | |
| Majority | | 17,189 | 10.64 | |
| Turnout | | 1,61,533 | 74.45 | |
| BJP hold | | | | |

=== 2019 ===
In 2019 election, Bharatiya Janata Party candidate Bhabani Shankar Bhoi defeated Biju Janata Dal candidate Stephen Wilson Soreng by 16,188 votes.

2019 Odisha Vidhan Sabha election: Talsara
| Party | Candidate | Votes | % | ±% |
|---|---|---|---|---|
| BJP | Bhabani Shankar Bhoi | 60,264 | 39.31 | ▲9.63 |
| BJD | Stephen Wilson Soreng | 44,076 | 28.75 | ▼3.08 |
| INC | Prafulla Majhi | 41,111 | 26.82 | ▼6.04 |
| NOTA | None of the above | 1456 | 0.95 | − |
| Majority | | 16188 | 10.56 | |
| Turnout | | 153290 | 74.1 | |
| BJP gain from INC | | | | |

=== 2014 ===
In 2014 election, Indian National Congress candidate Prafulla Majhi defeated Biju Janata Dal candidate Binay Kumar Toppo by 1,438 votes.

2014 Odisha Vidhan Sabha Election: Talsara
| Party | Candidate | Votes | % | ±% |
|---|---|---|---|---|
| INC | Prafulla Majhi | 45,689 | 32.86 | ▼6.99 |
| BJD | Binaya Kumar Toppo | 44,251 | 31.83 | − |
| BJP | Santosh Kumar Amat | 41,272 | 29.68 | ▲7.68 |
| NOTA | None of the above | 2,716 | 1.95 | − |
| Majority | | 1,438 | 1.03 | |
| Turnout | | 1,39,035 | 72.21 | 7.21 |
| Registered electors | | 1,92,545 | | |
| INC hold | | | | |

=== 2009 ===
In 2009 election, Indian National Congress candidate Prafulla Majhi defeated Bharatiya Janata Party candidate Sahadeva Xaxa by 19,741 votes.

2009 Odisha Vidhan Sabha Election: Talsara
| Party | Candidate | Votes | % | ±% |
|---|---|---|---|---|
| INC | Prafulla Majhi | 44,082 | 39.85 | − |
| BJP | Sahadeva Xaxa | 24,341 | 22.00 | − |
| NCP | Purna Chandra Minz | 16,105 | 14.56 | − |
| Majority | | 19,741 | 17.85 (Note: % of total valid votes) | |
| Turnout | | 1,10,619 | 65.00 | |
| INC hold | | | | |
