= Nilgiri Assembly constituency =

Constituency of the Odisha legislative assembly in India

Coordinates: 21.46°N 86.76°E

Nilgiri
- Constituency No. 40 for the Odisha Legislative Assembly

Constituency details
- Country: India
- Region: East India
- State: Odisha
- Division: Central Division
- District: Balasore
- Lok Sabha constituency: Balasore
- Established: 1951
- Total electors: 2,16,428 (Note: as on 2024) (Note: as data published by election commission)
- Reservation: None

Member of Legislative Assembly
- 17th Odisha Legislative Assembly
- Incumbent Santosh Khatua
- Party: Bharatiya Janata Party
- Elected year: 2024

Nilgiri is a Vidhan Sabha constituency of Balasore district, Odisha.

Area of this constituency includes Nilagiri, Nilgiri block, Oupada block and 4 GPs (Kasabajayapur, Khantapada, Panapana and Patharpentha) of Bahanaga block.

== Elected members ==
Vote share of winning candidates
2024	52.19%
2019	44.34%
2014	35.96%
2009	40.95%
2004	48.49%
2000	41.61%
1995	30.33%
1990	34.38%
1985	49.07%
1980	43.44%
1977	41.91%

Since its formation in 1951, 17 elections were held till date. It was a 2 member constituency in 1952.

List of members elected from Nilgiri constituency are:

Election	Name	Party
2024	Santosh Khatua	Bharatiya Janata Party
2019	Sukanta Kumar Nayak	Bharatiya Janata Party
2014	Sukanta Kumar Nayak	Biju Janata Dal
2009	Pratap Chandra Sarangi	Independent politician
2004	Pratap Chandra Sarangi	Bharatiya Janata Party
2000	Pradipta Panda	Communist Party of India (Marxist)
1995	Akshaya Kumar Acharya	Indian National Congress
1990	Chittaranjan Sarangi	Independent politician
1985	Sukumar Nayak	Indian National Congress
1980	Akshaya Kumar Acharya	Indian National Congress (I)
1977	Rajendra Chandra Mardaraj Harichandan	Janata Party
1974	Banamali Das	Communist Party of India (Marxist)
1971	Banamali Das	Communist Party of India (Marxist)
1967	Banamali Das	Communist Party of India (Marxist)
1961	Rajendra Chandra Mardaraj Harichandan	Swatantra Party
1957	Nilambar Das	Indian National Congress
1951 (Note: It was a 2 member constituency)	Chaitanya Prasad Sethi	Indian National Congress
1951	Nilambar Das	Indian National Congress

== Election results ==
=== 2024 ===
Voting were held on 1st June 2024 in 4th phase of Odisha Assembly Election & 7th phase of Indian General Election. Counting of votes was on 4th June 2024. In 2024 election, Bharatiya Janata Party candidate Santosh Khatua defeated Biju Janata Dal candidate Sukanta Kumar Nayak by a margin of 19,839 votes.

2024 Odisha Vidhan Sabha Election, Nilgiri
Party	Candidate	Votes	%	±%
BJP	Santosh Khatua	87,928	52.2	
BJD	Sukanta Kumar Nayak	68,089	40.42	
INC	Akshya Kumar Acharya	8,210	4.87	
Majority		19,839	11.78	
Turnout		1,68,447	77.83	
BJP gain from BJD				

=== 2019 ===
In 2019 election, Bharatiya Janata Party candidate Sukanta Kumar Nayak defeated Biju Janata Dal candidate Santosh Khatua by a margin of 1,577 votes.

2019 Vidhan Sabha Election, Nilgiri
Party	Candidate	Votes	%	±%
BJP	Sukanta Kumar Nayak	69,517	44.34	
BJD	Santosh Khatua	67,940	43.33	
INC	Manoj Manjari Debi	12,413	7.92	
NOTA	None of the above	1,203	0.77	
Majority		1,577	1.01	
Turnout		1,56,780	77.06	
Registered electors		2,03,441		
BJP gain from BJD				

=== 2014 ===
In 2014 election, Biju Janata Dal candidate Sukanta Kumar Nayak defeated Bharatiya Janata Party candidate Sushama Biswal by a margin of 13,700 votes.

2014 Vidhan Sabha Election, Nilgiri
Party	Candidate	Votes	%	±%
BJD	Sukanta Kumar Nayak	50,514	35.96	
BJP	Sushama Biswal	36,814	26.21	
INC	Kartik Mohapatra	32,360	23.04	3.53
CPI(M)	Pradipta Panda	17,018	12.12	
NOTA	None of the above	1,127	0.8	−
Majority		13,700	9.75	7.11
Turnout		1,40,456	78.82	10.17
Registered electors		1,78,193		
BJD gain from Independent				

=== 2009 ===
In 2009 election, Independent candidate Pratap Chandra Sarangi defeated Communist Party of India (Marxist) candidate Pradipta Panda by a margin of 3,056 votes.

2009 Vidhan Sabha Election, Nilgiri
Party	Candidate	Votes	%	±%
Independent	Pratap Chandra Sarangi	35,525	30.63	-
CPI(M)	Pradipta Panda	32,469	28.00	−
INC	Diptikanta Mahapatra	22,627	19.51	−
Independent	Kartik Mohapatra	16,726	14.42	−
Majority		3,056	2.64 (Note: % of total valid votes)	−
Turnout		1,15,972	68.65	−
Independent gain from BJP				
