= Invest Odisha =

Ministry of the Government of Odisha, India

- Country: (India)
- Chief Minister: Naveen Patnaik
- Key people: Government of Odisha
- Status: Active

Invest Odisha is part of the Ministry of Industries Administration of the Government of Odisha to promote national and foreign direct investment to Odisha. Invest Odisha is spearheading the investment promotion campaign for Odisha. This team was previously referred to as Team Odisha. Industrial facilitation and investment promotion are the key roles of Invest Odisha.

== Portals ==
=== GO Care ===
- GO Care is Government of Odisha's Corporate Social Responsibility (CSR) Administration and Responsive Engagement Portal.

=== GO Plus ===
- GO Plus is Government of Odisha's Geographic Information System (GIS) based Industrial Land Use and Infrastructure Information System.

=== GO Smile ===
- GO Smile is Government of Odisha's Synchronized Mechanism for Inspection of Licensed Enterprises.

=== GO Swift ===
- GO Swift is Government of Odisha's Online Single Window Portal i.e. Single Window for Investor Facilitation and Tracking. It is developed and initiated to transform the B2G interface through the entire investment life cycle.

== See also ==
- Economy of Odisha
- Make in Odisha
- Make in India
- Government of Odisha
