= Basanta Kumar Panda =

Indian politician

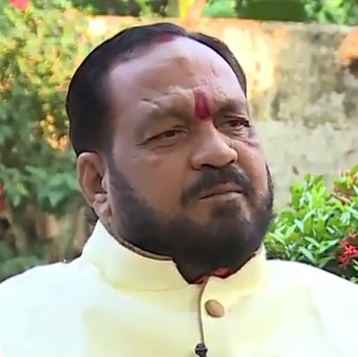

Member of Parliament, Lok Sabha
- In office 23 May 2019 – 4 June 2024
- Preceded by: Arka Keshari Deo
- Succeeded by: Malvika Devi
- Constituency: Kalahandi Lok Sabha constituency

Member of Odisha Legislative Assembly
- In office 2014–2019
- Preceded by: Rajendra Dholakia
- Succeeded by: Rajendra Dholakia
- Constituency: Nuapada
- In office 2000–2004
- Preceded by: Jagarnath Pattnaik
- Succeeded by: Rajendra Dholakia
- Constituency: Nuapada

President of Bharatiya Janata Party, Odisha
- In office 4 January 2016 – 16 January 2020
- Preceded by: Kanak Vardhan Singh Deo
- Succeeded by: Samir Mohanty

Personal details
- Born: 12 May 1961 (age 65) Nuapada, Odisha, India
- Party: Bharatiya Janata Party
- Spouse: Surabhi Panda
- Children: Abhinandan Panda
- Parents: Laxmi Prasad Panda (father); Khitisuta Panda (mother)

Basanta Kumar Panda is an Indian politician who was the Member of Parliament in the Lok Sabha from Kalahandi and he was a Member of the Odisha Legislative Assembly from Nuapada and also he was President of Bharatiya Janata Party, Odisha.
