= Prithviraj Harichandan =

Indian politician

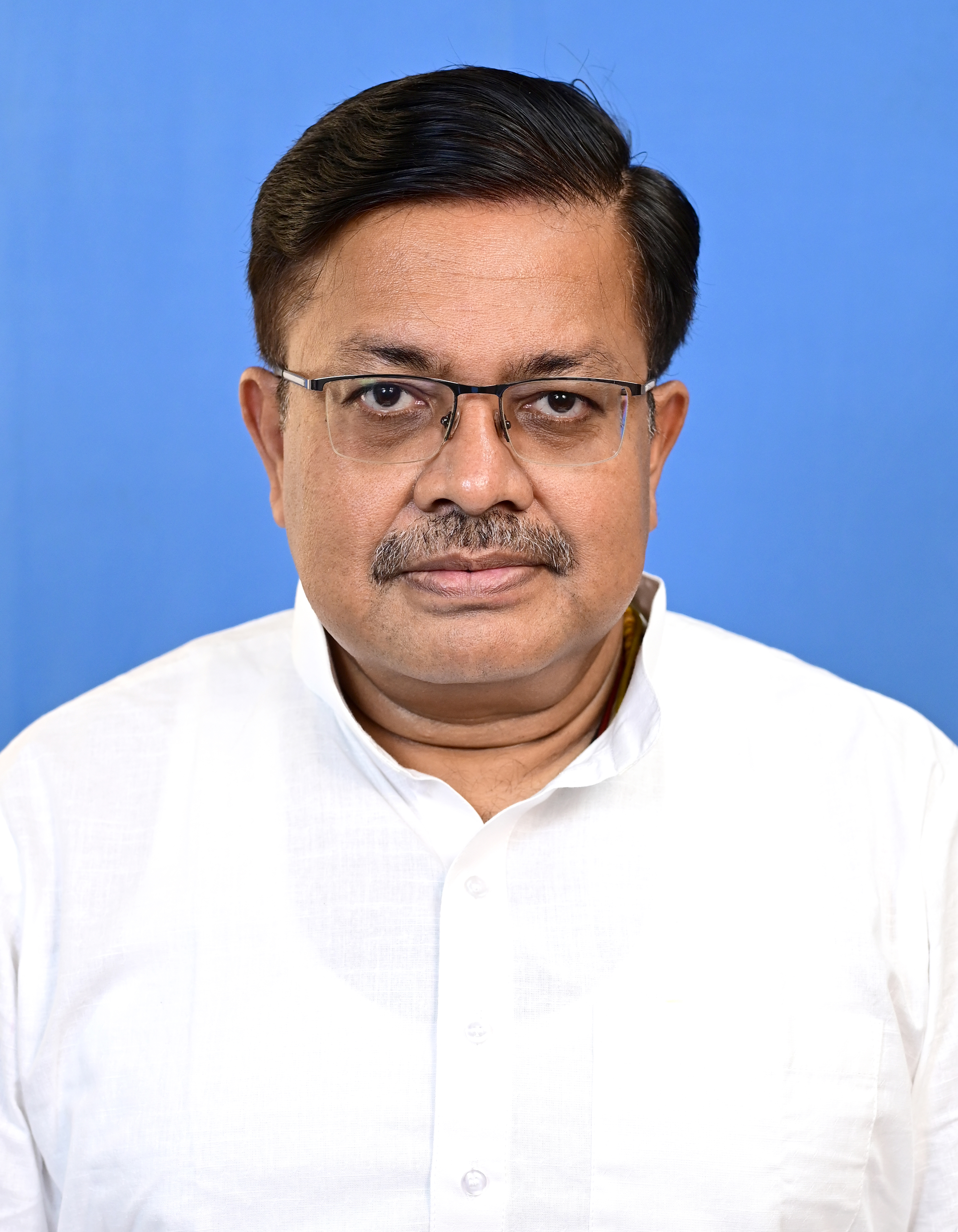
- Harichandan in 2024

Minister of Law, Works, Excise, Government of Odisha
- Incumbent
- Assumed office 12 June 2024
- Chief Minister: Mohan Charan Majhi

Member of Odisha Legislative Assembly
- Incumbent
- Assumed office 4 June 2024
- Preceded by: Kishore Chandra Naik
- Constituency: Chilika

Personal details
- Born: 6 December 1968 (age 57) Chilika, Odisha
- Party: Bharatiya Janata Party
- Parent: Biswabhusan Harichandan (Father)
- Profession: Politician, Consultant

Prithviraj Harichandan is an Indian politician and Minister of Law, Works, Excise Government of Odisha. He is a member of the Member of Odisha Legislative Assembly from Chilika assembly constituency of Khordha district. He is the son of Biswabhusan Harichandan, who was served as the Governor of Chhattisgarh.

== Early life and career ==
Prithviraj did his Master in Science from Utkal University in 1987–89.

On 12 June 2024, he took oath along with Chief Minister Mohan Charan Majhi in Janata Maidan, Bhubaneswar. Governor Raghubar Das administered their oath. Prime Minister Narendra Modi, Home Minister Amit Shah, Defense Minister Rajnath Singh, along with Chief Ministers of 10 BJP-ruled states were present at the time of oath.
