= Krushna Chandra Mohapatra =

Indian politician

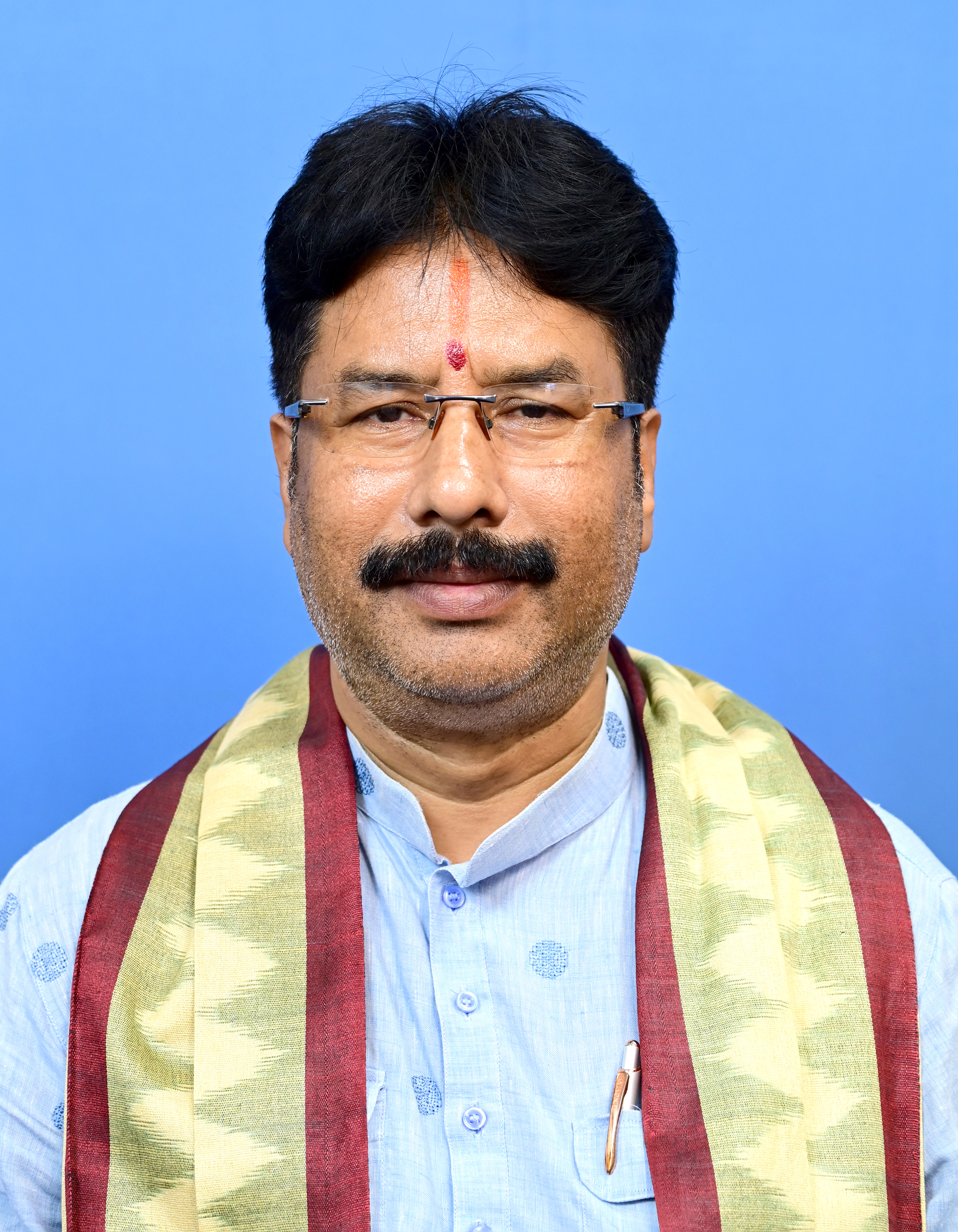

Minister of Housing and Urban Development, Public Enterprise, Government of Odisha
- In office 12 June 2024 – present
- Chief Minister: Mohan Charan Majhi

Member of Odisha Legislative Assembly
- In office 4 June 2024 – present
- Preceded by: Rajkishore Das
- Constituency: Morada

Personal details
- Party: Bharatiya Janata Party
- Parent: Ram Chandra Mahapatra
- Profession: Politician, businessman

Krushna Chandra Mohapatra is an Indian politician and Minister of Housing and Urban Development, Public Enterprise in Government of Odisha. He is a member of the Odisha Legislative Assembly from Morada assembly constituency of Mayurbhanj district.

He did his Bachelor of Ayurvedic Medicine and Surgery passed from Mayurbhanj Ayurved Mahavidyalaya, Baripada in the year 1997 under Utkal University.

On 12 June 2024, he took oath along with Chief Minister Mohan Charan Majhi took oath in Janata Maidan, Bhubaneswar. Governor Raghubar Das administered their oath. Prime Minister Narendra Modi, Home Minister Amit Shah, Defense Minister Rajnath Singh, along with Chief Ministers of 10 BJP-ruled states were present.
