= Srikanta Sahu =

Indian politician

Member of Odisha Legislative Assembly
- In office 2014–2024
- Preceded by: Niranjan Pradhan
- Constituency: Polasara

Personal details
- Political party: Biju Janata Dal
- Profession: Politician

Srikanta Sahu is an Indian politician from Odisha. He was a two time elected Member of the Odisha Legislative Assembly from 2014 and 2019, representing Polasara Assembly constituency as a Member of the Biju Janata Dal.

== See also ==
- 2019 Odisha Legislative Assembly election
- Odisha Legislative Assembly
