= Jashipur Assembly constituency =

Constituency of the Odisha legislative assembly in India

Coordinates: 21.97°N 86.08°E

Jashipur
- Constituency No. 26 for the Odisha Legislative Assembly

Constituency details
- Country: India
- Region: East India
- State: Odisha
- Division: Central Division
- District: Mayurbhanj
- Lok Sabha constituency: Mayurbhanj
- Established: 1957
- Total electors: 2,19,031 (Note: as on 2024) (Note: as data published by election commission)
- Reservation: ST

Member of Legislative Assembly
- 17th Odisha Legislative Assembly
- Incumbent Ganesh Ram Singh Khuntia
- Party: Bharatiya Janata Party
- Elected year: 2024

Jashipur is a Vidhan Sabha constituency of Mayurbhanj district, Odisha.

Area of this constituency includes Jashipur block, Raruan block, Sukruli block, and 9 GPs (Badhatnabeda, Chuapani, Dhangdimuta, Hatbadra, Jarada, Jhipabandh, Talapati, Tolakpokhari and Uparbeda) of Kusumi block. Many villages consisting of small clusters of houses are located near Jashipur like Kanjipia, Keunjhar etc.

== Elected members ==
Vote share of winning candidates
2024	50.25%
2019	36.67%
2014	25.78%
2009	29.97%
2004	25.92%
2000	29.86%
1995	25.11%
1990	40.88%
1985	25.89%
1980	41.16%
1977	54.97%

Since its formation in 1957, 16 elections were held till date.

List of members elected from Jashipur constituency are:

Year	Member	Party
2024	Ganesh Ram Singh Khuntia	Bharatiya Janata Party
2019	Ganesh Ram Singh Khuntia	Bharatiya Janata Party
2014	Mangal Singh Mudi	Biju Janata Dal
2009	Kamala Kanta Nayak	Biju Janata Dal
2004	Sambhunath Naik	Socialist Unity Centre of India (Communist)
2000	Bhanu Charan Naik	Bharatiya Janata Party
1995	Sambhunath Naik	Socialist Unity Centre of India (Communist)
1990	Mangal Singh Mudi	Janata Dal
1985	Sambhunath Naik	Socialist Unity Centre of India (Communist)
1980	Sundar Mohan Majhi	Indian National Congress (I)
1977	Kanhuram Hembram	Janata Party
1974	Ghanshyam Hembram	Jharkhand Party
1971	Lal Mohan Nayak	Indian National Congress (R)
1967	Durga Charan Nayak	Swatantra Party
1961	Mochiram Tiriya	Indian National Congress
1957	Mochiram Tiriya	Ganatantra Parishad

== Election results ==
=== 2024 ===
Voting were held on 1st June 2024 in 4th phase of Odisha Assembly Election & 7th phase of Indian General Election. Counting of votes was on 4th June 2024. In 2024 election, Bharatiya Janata Party candidate Ganesh Ram Singh Khuntia defeated Biju Janata Dal candidate Chakradhar Hembrom by a margin of 34,667 votes.

2024 Odisha Vidhan Sabha Election: Jashipur
Party	Candidate	Votes	%	±%
BJP	Ganesh Ram Singh Khuntia	85,384	50.25	
BJD	Chakradhar Hembrom	50,717	29.85	
INC	Shweta Chattar	18,151	10.68	
SUCI(C)	Nilambar Naik	6,146	3.69	
NOTA	None of the above	3,555	2.09	
Majority		34,667	20.40	
Turnout		1,69,913	77.57	
BJP hold				

=== 2019 ===
In the 2019 election, Bharatiya Janata Party candidate Ganesh Ram Singh Khuntia defeated Biju Janata Dal candidate Golakbihari Nayak by a margin of 8,552 votes.

2019 Odisha Vidhan Sabha Election: Jashipur
Party	Candidate	Votes	%	±%
BJP	Ganesh Ram Singh Khuntia	58,708	36.67	
BJD	Golakbihari Nayak	50156	31.32	
SUCI(C)	Sambhunath Naik	32937	20.57	
INC	Mahendra Nath Nayak	9039	5.65	
NOTA	None of the above	2044	1.48	
Majority		8,552	5.35	
Turnout		1,60,118	76.24	
BJP gain from BJD				

=== 2014 ===
In 2014 election, Biju Janata Dal candidate Mangal Singh Mudi defeated Socialist Unity Centre of India (Communist) candidate Sambhunath Naik by a margin of 5,794 votes.

2014 Odisha Vidhan Sabha Election: Jashipur
Party	Candidate	Votes	%	±%
BJD	Mangal Singh Mudi	39,440	25.78	
SUCI(C)	Sambhunath Naik	33,646	21.99	
JMM	Mahesh Chandra Hembram	25,077	16.39	
BJP	Ragunath Hembram	24,319	15.89	
INC	Minati Nayak	9,518	6.22	
NOTA	None of the above	1,660	1.08	
Majority		5,794	3.79	
Turnout		1,53,003	80.07	
BJD hold				

=== 2009 ===
In 2009 election, Biju Janata Dal candidate Kamala Kanta Nayak defeated Independent candidate Sambhunath Naik by a margin of 13,190 votes.

2009 Odisha Vidhan Sabha Election: Jashipur
Party	Candidate	Votes	%	±%
BJD	Kamala Kanta Nayak	35,569	29.97	−
Independent	Sambhunath Naik	22,379	18.86	−
BJP	Sudhir Naik	16,974	14.30	−
Independent	Mahesh Chandra Hembram	13,422	11.31	−
INC	Mahendra Nath Nayak	13,318	11.22	−
JMM	Masuri Chattar	9,391	7.91	−
Majority		13,190	11.11 (Note: %of total valid votes)	−
Turnout		1,18,951	69.48	−
BJD gain from Independent				
