= Parshu Ram Dhada =

Indian politician

Member of Odisha Legislative Assembly
- In office 2014–2024
- Preceded by: Surendra Prasad Pramanik
- Constituency: Soro

Personal details
- Party: Biju Janata Dal
- Profession: Politician

Parshu Ram Dhada is an Indian politician from Odisha. He was a two time elected member of the Odisha Legislative Assembly from 2014 and 2019, representing the Soro Assembly constituency as a Member of the Biju Janata Dal.

== See also ==
- 2014 Odisha Legislative Assembly election
- Odisha Legislative Assembly
