= Subarna Naik =

Indian politician

Subarna Naik is a politician from Odisha, India. He represented the Keonjhar (Vidhan Sabha constituency) during the years 2009 to 2014.
