= Morada Assembly constituency =

Constituency of the Odisha legislative assembly in India

Coordinates: 21.85°N 86.99°E

Morada
- Constituency No. 34 for the Odisha Legislative Assembly

Constituency details
- Country: India
- Region: East India
- State: Odisha
- Division: Central Division
- District: Mayurbhanj
- Lok Sabha constituency: Mayurbhanj
- Established: 1951
- Total electors: 2,34,075 (Note: as on 2024) (Note: as data published by election commission)
- Reservation: None

Member of Legislative Assembly
- 17th Odisha Legislative Assembly
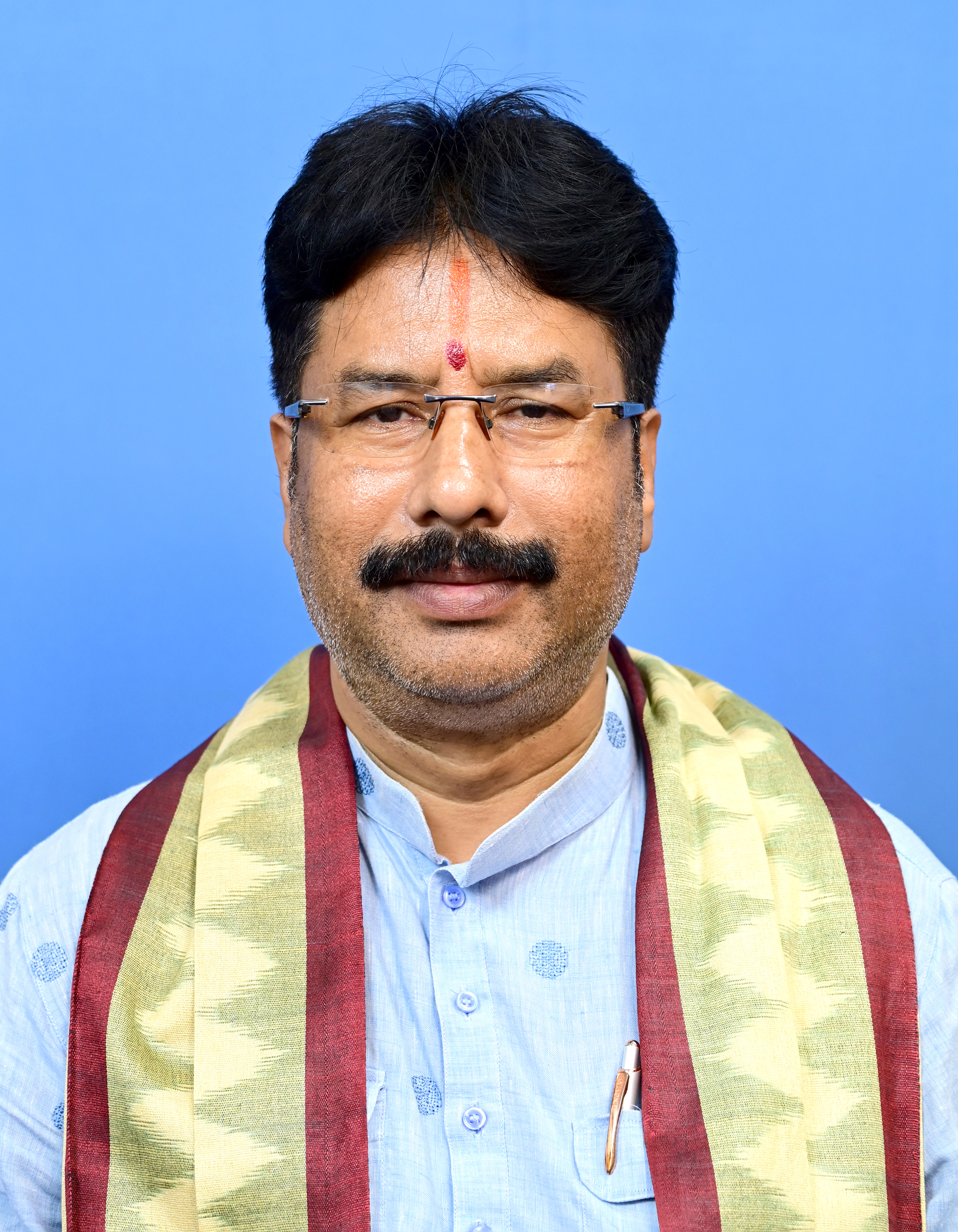
- Incumbent Krushna Chandra Mohapatra
- Party: Bharatiya Janata Party
- Elected year: 2024

Morada (Sl. No.: 34) is a Vidhan Sabha constituency of Mayurbhanj district, Odisha.

The area of this constituency includes Morada block, Rasagobindapur block, and Suliapada block.

Constituency didn't exist in 1957 and between 1974 & 2004. It was revived in 2008 Delimitation and went for polls in 2009 election.

== Elected members ==
Vote share of winning candidates
| 2024 | 43.33% |
| 2019 | 38.23% |
| 2014 | 32.03% |
| 2009 | 28.87% |

Since its formation in 1951, 8 elections have been held till date.

The list of members elected from Morada Vidhan Sabha constituency is:

| Year | Member | Party |
|---|---|---|
| 2024 | Dr. Krushna Chandra Mohapatra | Bharatiya Janata Party |
| 2019 | Rajkishore Das | Biju Janata Dal |
| 2014 | Praveen Chandra Bhanj Deo | Biju Janata Dal |
| 2009 | Praveen Chandra Bhanj Deo | Biju Janata Dal |
1973-2008: Constituency didn't exist
| 1971 | Kuanria Majhi | Swatantra Party |
| 1967 | Sakila Soren | Praja Socialist Party |
| 1961 | Sakila Soren | Indian National Congress |
1957 : Constituency didn't exist
| 1951 | Prasanna Kumar Dash | Socialist Party |

== Election results ==
=== 2024 ===
Voting was held on 1 June 2024 in the 4th phase of the Odisha Assembly Election & 7th phase of the Indian General Election. The counting of votes was on 4 June 2024. In 2024 election, Bharatiya Janata Party candidate Dr. Krushna Chandra Mohapatra defeated Biju Janata Dal candidate Preetinanda Kanungo by a margin of 33,270 votes.

2024 Odisha Vidhan Sabha Election, Morada
| Party | Candidate | Votes | % | ±% |
|---|---|---|---|---|
| BJP | Dr. Krushna Chandra Mohapatra | 77,980 | 43.33 | |
| BJD | Preetinanda Kanungo | 44,710 | 24.84 | |
| INC | Pravas Kar Mahapatra | 27,886 | 15.49 | |
| NOTA | None of the above | 780 | 0.43 | |
| Majority | | 33,270 | 18.49 | |
| Turnout | | 1,79,978 | 76.89 | |
| BJP gain from BJD | | | | |

=== 2019 ===
In 2019 election, Biju Janata Dal candidate Rajkishore Das defeated Bharatiya Janata Party candidate Dr. Krushna Chandra Mahapatra by a margin of 6,704 votes.

2019 Odisha Legislative Assembly election: Morada
| Party | Candidate | Votes | % | ±% |
|---|---|---|---|---|
| BJD | Rajkishore Das | 68,551 | 38.23 | |
| BJP | Dr. Krushna Chandra Mohapatra | 61,847 | 34.49 | |
| INC | Pravash Kar Mahapatra | 23,600 | 13.16 | |
| JMM | Kalinga Keshari Jena | 11,847 | 6.61 | |
| NOTA | None of the above | 1,556 | 0.87 | |
| Majority | | 6,704 | 3.74 | |
| Turnout | | 1,79,329 | 79.85 | |
| BJD hold | | | | |

=== 2014 ===
In 2014 election, Biju Janata Dal candidate Praveen Chandra Bhanjdeo defeated Bharatiya Janata Party candidate Rajkishore Das by a margin of 6,956 votes.

2014 Odisha Legislative Assembly election, Morada
| Party | Candidate | Votes | % | ±% |
|---|---|---|---|---|
| BJD | Praveen Chandra Bhanjdeo | 52,207 | 32.03 | |
| BJP | Rajkishore Das | 45,251 | 27.76 | |
| INC | Pravash Kar Mahapatra | 24,790 | 15.21 | |
| JMM | Manoranjan Dhal | 17,391 | 10.67 | |
| NOTA | None of the above | 1,176 | 0.72 | |
| Majority | | 6,956 | 4.27 | |
| Turnout | | 1,63,015 | 82.33 | |
| BJD hold | | | | |

=== 2009 ===
In 2009 election, Biju Janata Dal candidate Praveen Chandra Bhanjdeo defeated Jharkhand Mukti Morcha candidate Bimal Lochan Das by a margin of 6,201 votes.

2009 Odisha Legislative Assembly election, Morada
| Party | Candidate | Votes | % | ±% |
|---|---|---|---|---|
| BJD | Praveen Chandra Bhanjdeo | 37,609 | 28.87 | − |
| JMM | Bimal Lochan Das | 31,408 | 24.11 | − |
| BJP | Rajkishore Das | 26,955 | 20.69 | − |
| INC | Jnanendra Nath Das | 20,587 | 15.80 | − |
| Majority | | 6,201 | 4.6 (Note: % of total valid votes) | − |
| Turnout | | 1,30,306 | 76.00 | − |
| BJD win (new seat) | | | | |
