= Sambhunath Naik =

Indian politician

MLA 1985-1990, 1995–2000 & 2004-2009
- Constituency: Jashipur (ST)

Personal details
- Party: Socialist Unity Centre of India (Communist)

Sambhunath Naik is an Indian politician, belonging to the Socialist Unity Centre of India (Communist). He is a member of the Orissa State Committee of the party.

Naik was a Member of the Legislative Assembly of Orissa.

He was elected to the Assembly in 1985, 1995 and 2004, representing the Jashipur (ST) constituency. In the 1990, 2000 and 2009 elections, he finished second in the Jashipur constituency. He achieved his highest percentage so far in the 1990 election, 31.32%.

Naik is also the Orissa State Committee secretary of All India United Trade Union Centre. Moreover, he is the Vice President of the Orissa State Council of AIKKMS.
