= Jay Dholakia =

Indian politician

Member of Odisha Legislative Assembly
- Incumbent
- Assumed office 14 November 2025
- Preceded by: Rajendra Dholakia
- Constituency: Nuapada

Personal details
- Born: 11 May 1993 (age 33) Khariar Road, Odisha, India
- Party: Bharatiya Janata Party
- Other political affiliations: Biju Janata Dal
- Spouse: Suman Dholakia
- Parents: Rajendra Dholakia (father); Kalpana Dholakia (mother)
- Education: Chhatrapati Shahu Ji Maharaj University

Jay Dholakia is an Indian politician from Odisha. He is a Member of the Odisha Legislative Assembly from Nuapada bypoll election as a Member of the Bharatiya Janata Party.

He is the son of late minister and Biju Janata Dal leader Rajendra Dholakia.
