= Keonjhar Assembly constituency =

Assembly constituency in Odisha

Coordinates: 21.64°N 85.60°E

Keonjhar
- Constituency No. 24 for the Odisha Legislative Assembly

Constituency details
- Country: India
- Region: East India
- State: Odisha
- Division: Northern Division
- District: Kendujhar
- Lok Sabha constituency: Keonjhar
- Established: 1951
- Total electors: 2,31,912 (Note: as on 2024) (Note: as data published by election commission)
- Reservation: ST

Member of Legislative Assembly
- 17th Odisha Legislative Assembly
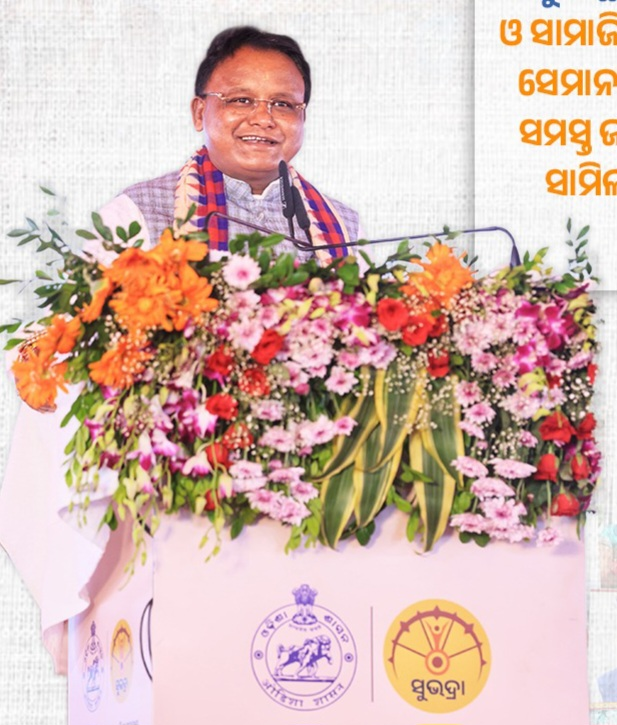
- Incumbent Mohan Charan Majhi; Chief Minister of Odisha
- Party: BJP
- Elected year: 2024

Keonjhar (Sl. No.: 24) is a Vidhan Sabha constituency of Kendujhar district.

== Elected members ==
Vote share of winning candidates
2024	47.05%
2019	42.10%
2014	35.87%
2009	30.34%
2004	40.14%
2000	59.08%
1995	33.82%
1990	55.20%
1985	48.98%
1980	45.85%
1977	52.59%

Since its formation in 1951, 18 elections were held till date including one bypoll in 1965. It was a 2-member constituency for 1952 & 1957.

List of members elected from Keonjhar constituency are:

Year	Member	Party
1951	Laxmi Narayan Bhanja Deo	Independent
1951	Govind Chandra Munda	Ganatantra Parishad
1957	Krushna Chandra Mahapatro	Independent
1957	Janardan Bhanj Deo	Ganatantra Parishad
1961	Janardan Bhanj Deo	Ganatantra Parishad
1965^	Karunakar Pradhan	Swatantra Party
1967	Govind Chandra Munda	Swatantra Party
1971	Chhotaray Majhi	Utkal Congress
1974	Govind Chandra Munda	Swatantra Party
1977	Kumar Majhi	Janata Party
1980	Jogendra Naik	Indian National Congress (I)
1985	Chhotaray Majhi	Janata Party
1990	Chhotaray Majhi	Janata Dal
1995	Jogendra Naik	Bharatiya Janata Party
2000	Mohan Charan Majhi	Bharatiya Janata Party
2004	Mohan Charan Majhi	Bharatiya Janata Party
2009	Subarna Naik	Biju Janata Dal
2014	Abhiram Naik	Biju Janata Dal
2019	Mohan Charan Majhi	Bharatiya Janata Party
2024	Mohan Charan Majhi	Bharatiya Janata Party

== Election results ==
=== 2024 ===
In 2024 election, Bharatiya Janata Party candidate Mohan Charan Majhi defeated Biju Janata Dal candidate Meena Majhi by a margin of 11,577 votes.

2024 Odisha Vidhan Sabha Election: Keonjhar
Party	Candidate	Votes	%	±%
BJP	Mohan Charan Majhi	87,815	47.05	▲4.95
BJD	Meena Majhi	76,238	40.84	▼0.61
INC	Pratibha Manjari Nayak	11,904	6.38	▼2.04
NOTA	None of the above	3,120	1.67	▲0.42
Majority		11,577	6.21	▲5.56
Turnout		1,86,652	80.48	
BJP hold				

=== 2019 ===
In 2019 election, Bharatiya Janata Party candidate Mohan Charan Majhi defeated Biju Janata Dal candidate Madhab Sardar by a margin of 1,124 votes.

2019 Odisha Vidhan Sabha Election: Keonjhar
Party	Candidate	Votes	%	±%
BJP	Mohan Charan Majhi	72,760	42.10	
BJD	Madhab Sardar	71,636	41.45	
INC	Bidyadhar Dehury	14,553	8.42	
NOTA	None of the above	2,160	1.25	
Majority		1,124	0.65	
Turnout		1,67,326	76.13	
BJP gain from BJD				

=== 2014 ===
In the 2014 election, Biju Janata Dal candidate Abhiram Naik defeated Bharatiya Janata Party candidate Mohan Charan Majhi by a margin of 8,676 votes.

2014 Odisha Vidhan Sabha Election: Keonjhar
Party	Candidate	Votes	%	±%
BJD	Abhiram Naik	55,959	35.87	5.53
BJP	Mohan Charan Majhi	47,283	30.31	6.02
Independent	Dwarika Nath Naik	25,755	16.51	
INC	Sidheswar Naik	17,531	11.24	6.51
NOTA	None of the above	3,671	2.35	
Majority		8,676	5.56	
Turnout		1,55,987	78.12	
Registered electors		1,99,673		
BJD hold				

=== 2009 ===
In the 2009 election, Biju Janata Dal candidate Subarna Naik defeated Bharatiya Janata Party candidate Mohan Charan Majhi by a margin of 5,269 votes.

2009 Odisha Vidhan Sabha Election: Keonjhar
Party	Candidate	Votes	%	±%
BJD	Subarna Naik	36,471	30.34	−
BJP	Mohan Charan Majhi	29,202	24.29	−
Independent	Sidheswar Naik	24,320	20.23	−
INC	Bidyadhar Dehury	21,338	17.75	−
Majority		7,269	6.05 (Note: % of total valid votes)	−
Turnout		1,20,247	64.81	−
BJD gain from BJP				
