= Polasara Assembly constituency =

Constituency of the Odisha legislative assembly in India

Coordinates: 19.70°N 84.82°E

Polasara
- Constituency No. 124 for the Odisha Legislative Assembly
- Polasara Assembly constituency in Ganjam district

Constituency details
- Country: India
- Region: East India
- State: Odisha
- Division: Southern Division
- District: Ganjam
- Lok Sabha constituency: Aska
- Established: 2009
- Total electors: 2,49,263 (Note: as on 2024) (Note: as data published by election commission)
- Reservation: None

Member of Legislative Assembly
- 17th Odisha Legislative Assembly
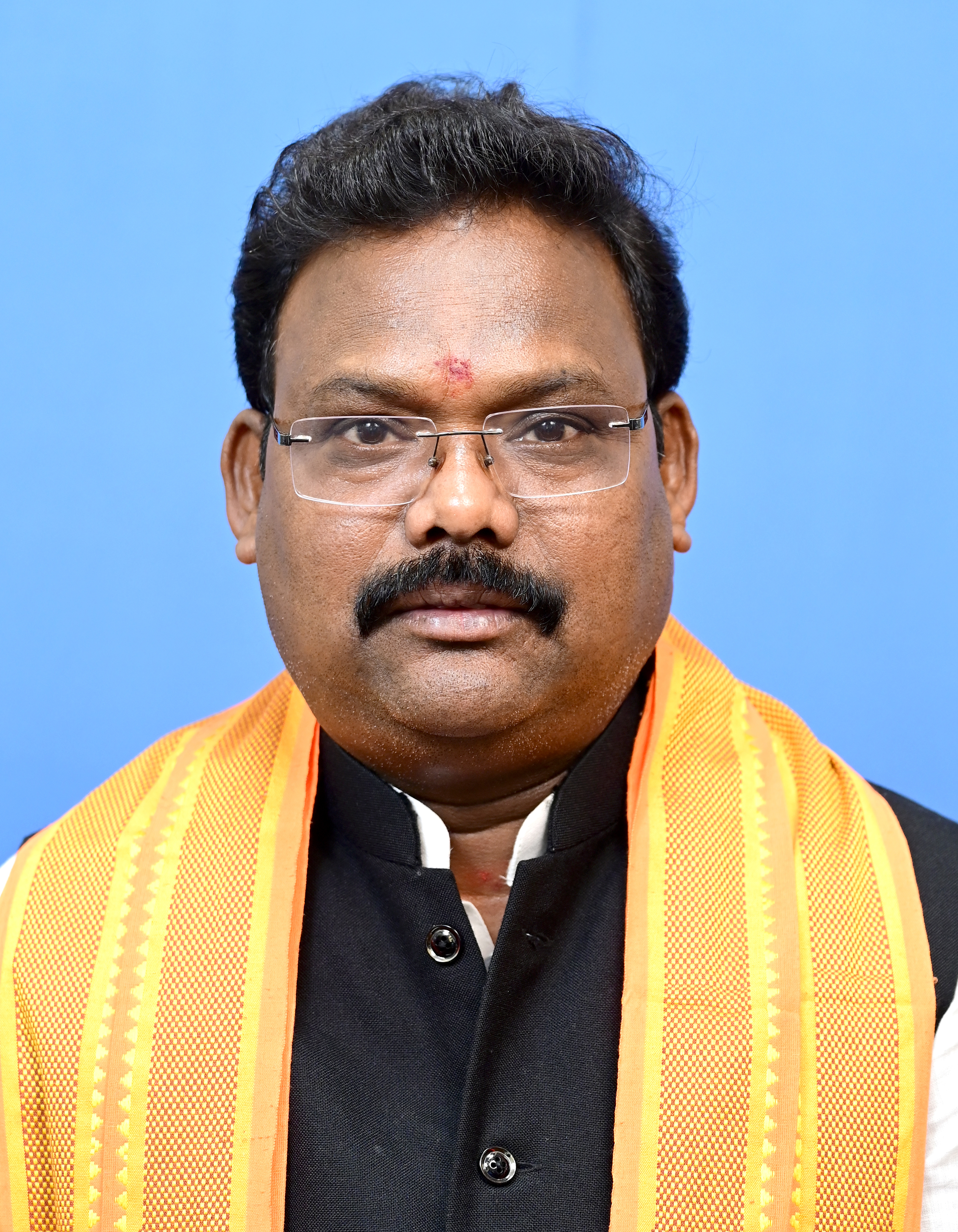
- Incumbent Gokulananda Mallick
- Party: Bharatiya Janata Party
- Elected year: 2024

Polasara is a Vidhan Sabha constituency of Ganjam district, Odisha.

This constituency includes Polasara, Buguda, Polasara block and Buguda block.

The constituency was formed in 2008 Delimitation and went for polls in 2009 election.

== Elected members ==
Vote share of winning candidates
2024	53.33%
2019	50.39%
2014	48.1%
2009	49.04%

Since its formation in 2009, 4 elections were held till date.

List of members elected from Polasara constituency are:

Year	Member	Party
2024	Gokulananda Mallick	Bharatiya Janata Party
2019	Srikanta Sahu	Biju Janata Dal
2014	Srikanta Sahu	Biju Janata Dal
2009	Niranjan Pradhan	Biju Janata Dal

== Election results ==
=== 2024 ===
Voting were held on 20 May 2024 in 2nd phase of Odisha Assembly Election & 5th phase of Indian General Election. Counting of votes was on 4 June 2024. In 2024 election, Bharatiya Janata Party candidate Gokulananda Mallick defeated Biju Janata Dal candidate Srikanta Sahu by a margin of 20,946 votes.

2024 Odisha Vidhan Sabha Election, Polasara
Party	Candidate	Votes	%	±%
BJP	Gokulananda Mallick	85,737	53.33	
BJD	Srikanta Sahu	64,791	40.3	
INC	Agasti Barada	3,763	2.34	
NOTA	None of the above	1,791	1.11	
Majority		20,946	13.03	
Turnout		1,60,776	64.5	
BJP gain from BJD				

=== 2019 ===
In 2019 election, Biju Janata Dal candidate Srikanta Sahu defeated Bharatiya Janata Party candidate Gokulananda Mallick by a margin of 12,739 votes.

2019 Vidhan Sabha Election, Polasara
Party	Candidate	Votes	%	±%
BJD	Srikanta Sahu	80,463	50.39	
BJP	Gokulananda Mallick	67,724	42.41	
INC	Hari Charan Swain	3,493	2.19	
NOTA	None of the above	1,565	0.98	
Majority		12,739	7.98	
Turnout		1,59,689	66.93	
BJD hold				

=== 2014 ===
In 2014 election, Biju Janata Dal candidate Srikanta Sahu defeated Indian National Congress candidate Gokulananda Mallick by a margin of 21,217 votes.

2014 Vidhan Sabha Election, Polasara
Party	Candidate	Votes	%	±%
BJD	Srikanta Sahu	76,766	48.1	▼0.94
INC	Gokulananda Mallick	45,549	32.82	▼6.16
BJP	Kumudini Patnaik	18,467	13.31	▲8.33
NOTA	None of the above	1,446	1.04	−
Majority		21,217	15.29	▲5.23
Turnout		1,38,794	64.96	▲7.68
Registered electors		2,13,647		
BJD hold				

=== 2009 ===
In 2009 election, Biju Janata Dal candidate Niranjan Pradhan defeated Indian National Congress candidate Ram Krushna Patnaik by a margin of 11,322 votes.

2009 Vidhan Sabha Election: Polasara
Party	Candidate	Votes	%	±%
BJD	Niranjan Pradhan	55,193	49.04	−
INC	Ram Krushna Patnaik	43,871	38.98	−
BJP	Jayanti Padhiary	5,604	4.98	−
Majority		11,322	10.06 (Note: % of total valid votes)	−
Turnout		1,12,989	57.28	−
BJD win (new seat)				
