= Madhab Dhada =

Indian politician

Member of Odisha Legislative Assembly
- Incumbent
- Assumed office 4 June 2024
- Preceded by: Parshuram Dhada
- Constituency: Soro

Personal details
- Party: Biju Janata Dal
- Profession: Politician

Madhab Dhada is an Indian politician who was elected to the Odisha Legislative Assembly from Soro as a member of the Biju Janata Dal.
