= Ashok Das =

Indian American physicist

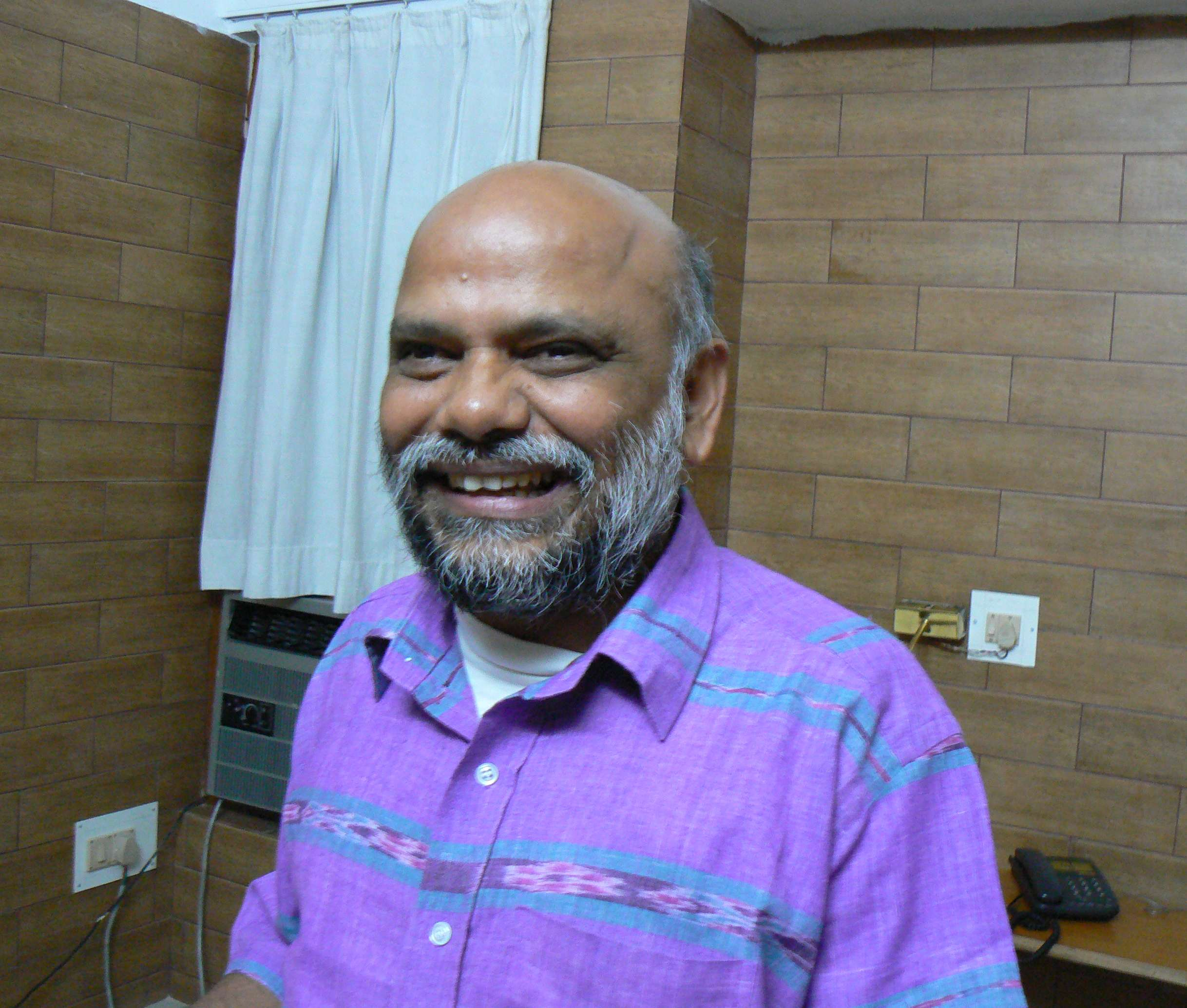
Ashok Das

Ashok Das is an Indian-American physicist. He is professor of physics at University of Rochester and adjunct professor of physics at both Saha Institute of Nuclear Physics, Kolkata, India and Institute of Physics, Bhubaneswar, India.

== Early life and education ==
Das was born in Puri, Odisha, on March 23, 1953. He received his BS (with honors) in 1972 and MS in physics in 1974 from the University of Delhi. He did his graduate studies in supersymmetry and supergravity at State University of New York at Stony Brook. He received his PhD in 1977.

== Career ==
Das was a research associate at the City College of New York, the University of Maryland, and Rutgers University. He was promoted to professor in 1993 and has been employed at the University of Rochester since 1982.

Das' research is in the area of theoretical High-energy physics. His research has focused on questions of symmetry in the fundamental laws of nature. He has worked on nonlinear integrable systems, finite temperature field theories, generalization of the Standard Model to incorporate CP violation, and problems in Quantum field theory and String theory.

In 2002, Das became a fellow of the American Physical Society "for contributions in the areas of supergravity, integrable models, and finite temperature field theory." In 2006, he was awarded a Fulbright scholarship to teach physics in Brazil.

Ashok Das has written books and monographs on various disciplines of theoretical physics at the advanced undergraduate and graduate level. Some of his books include: A Path Integral Approach (World Scientific publishers), Finite Temperature Field Theory (World Scientific publishers), Integrable Models (World Scientific Lecture Notes in Physics), Lectures on Gravitation (World Scientific publishers), and Lectures on Electromagnetism.
