= Bibhuti Bhushan Jena =

Indian politician

Member of the Odisha Legislative Assembly
- Incumbent
- Assumed office 4 June 2024
- Preceded by: Pradeep Kumar Panigrahy
- Constituency: Gopalpur

Personal details
- Party: Bharatiya Janata Party
- Profession: Politician

Bibhuti Bhushan Jena is an Indian politician. He was elected to the Odisha Legislative Assembly from Gopalpur as a member of the Bharatiya Janata Party.
