= Nihar Ranjan Mahanand =

Indian politician

Member of Odisha Legislative Assembly
- Incumbent
- Assumed office 4 June 2024
- Preceded by: Snehangini Chhuria
- Constituency: Attabira

Personal details
- Party: Bharatiya Janata Party
- Profession: Politician

Nihar Ranjan Mahanand is an Indian politician. He was elected to the Odisha Legislative Assembly from Attabira as a member of the Bharatiya Janata Party.
