= Make in Odisha =

Initiative by the Government of Odisha, India

- Country: India
- Status: Active
- Website: mio.investodisha.gov.in

Make in Odisha is an initiative launched by the Government of Odisha for industrial growth in the State. The major investors in the state are NTPC, MCL, SAIL, Tata Steel, TCS, Adani, JSPL, PPL, IOCL and many more. Over 80 companies investing and The state has received investment worth Rs 2,03,270 crore (30 B USD). Major investment sector are IT, fertiliser, petro chemicals, food processing, health, infrastructure, ESDM, metal and minerals, manufacturing, textiles and tourism. The Make in Odisha conclave happens bi-annually. There are two Make in Odisha conclaves completed with crores of investment proposals and the third edition will be held between 30 November to 4 December 2020.

== Events ==
=== Make in Odisha conclave 2016 ===
The first Make in Odisha conclave was organised by Government of Odisha, Department of Industrial Policy & Promotion (DIPP) and Government of India and Confederation of Indian Industry (CII) between 30 November 2016 to 2 December 2016 in Bhubaneswar, Odisha . The key objective of the conclave is to showcase the manufacturing prowess of the state and the investment opportunities across the focus sectors. Which are:

- Chemicals, Petrochemicals and Plastics
- Ancillary and Downstream in Metal sector
- Textiles and Apparel
- Food Processing including Seafood
- Electronics Manufacturing and IT and
- Tourism

In the conclave the Odisha Governments has received 28 proposals of 18,434 crores investment with a capacity of 27,565 jobs generation. The first edition got 124 investment intents or proposals worth more than Rs 2 lakh crore, and employment opportunities for over one lakh people.

=== Make in Odisha conclave 2018 ===
The second edition of Make in Odisha was held from 11 November 2018 to 15 November 2018 in Bhubaneswar, Odisha. Six countries, Japan, China, Italy, Germany, Saudi Arabia and South Korea along with industrialist from India had attended this conclave.

The top two investment proposals were received from Haldia Petrochemicals (Rs 70,000 crore), in the fertilizer, refinery, petrochemical, chemical and plastics department and with potential employment of 31,000.

Jindal Steel and Power are going to take their 6 million tonne steel plant to a 20 million tonne steel plant and their investment from Rs 45,000 crores to Rs 100,000 crores, from employing 50,000 people to employing 100,000 people,

In the conclave, Mukesh Ambani has announced that, Reliance Industries will invest 3000 crores ($410 million approx..) in Odisha over the next three years. Tata Sons Group chairman, Natarajan Chandrasekaran also assured Rs 25,000 ($3.45 billion approx.) crore investment. Birla Group chairman Kumar Mangalam Birla, announced an investment of 2 billion dollars.

This conclave has now witnessed investment proposals worth Rs 4.19 lakh crore for projects across 15 sectors that can create around 5.91 lakh potential jobs.

=== Make in Odisha Conclave 2022 ===
The third edition of the Conclave, will be held between 30 November and 4 December 2022.

== See also ==
- Make in India
