= Bhabani Shankar Bhoi =

Politician from Odisha

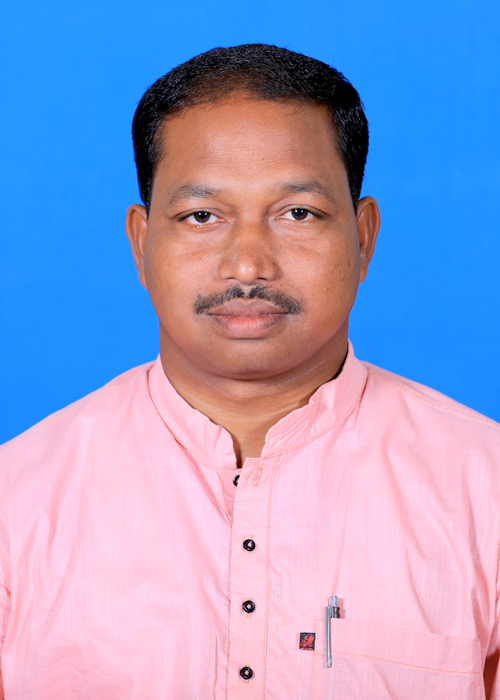

Deputy Speaker of Odisha Legislative Assembly
- Incumbent
- Assumed office 2024
- Preceded by: Saluga Pradhan
- Speaker: Surama Padhy

Member of Odisha Legislative Assembly
- Incumbent
- Assumed office 2019
- Preceded by: Prafulla Majhi
- Constituency: Talsara

Personal details
- Born: 25 April 1980 (age 46) Sundargarh, Odisha
- Party: Bharatiya Janata Party
- Spouse: Latika Sa
- Children: 1 Daughter
- Parent: Parameswar Bhoi (father)
- Education: 12th Pass

Bhabani Shankar Bhoi is an Indian politician & Deputy spekar of Odisha assembly. He was elected to the Odisha Legislative Assembly from Talsara (ST) in the 2019 Odisha Legislative Assembly election as a member of the Bharatiya Janata Party.
