= Mohan Charan Majhi =

Chief Minister of Odisha (born 1972)

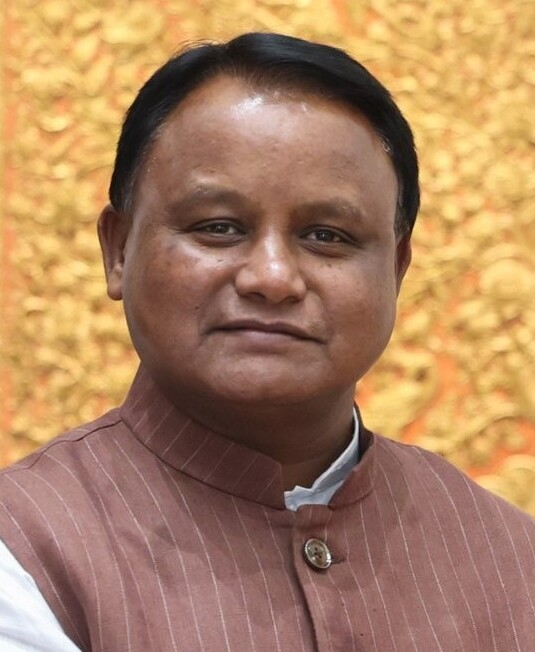
- Majhi in 2026

15th Chief Minister of Odisha
- Incumbent
- Assumed office 12 June 2024
- Governor: Raghubar Das; Kambhampati Hari Babu; Braj Mohan Ram
- Deputy: Pravati Parida; Kanak Vardhan Singh Deo
- Cabinet: Majhi
- Preceded by: Naveen Patnaik

Member of Odisha Legislative Assembly
- Incumbent
- Assumed office 23 May 2019
- Preceded by: Abhiram Naik
- Constituency: Keonjhar
- In office 2000–2009
- Preceded by: Jogendra Naik
- Succeeded by: Subarna Naik
- Constituency: Keonjhar

Personal details
- Born: 6 January 1972 (age 54) Raikala, Odisha, India
- Party: Bharatiya Janata Party
- Spouse: Priyanka Marandi
- Children: 2
- Education: Chandra Sekhar College, Champua (BA); Dhenkanal Law College (LLB)
- Occupation: Lawyer; politician

Mohan Charan Majhi (IPA: [mohɔnɔ t͡ʃɔɾɔɳɔ mad͡ʒʱi]; born 6 January 1972) is an Indian politician, currently serving as the Chief Minister of Odisha from May 2024. He was elected to the Odisha Legislative Assembly from Keonjhar in the 2024 Odisha Legislative Assembly election as a member of the Bharatiya Janata Party (BJP). He also represented the same constituency from 2000 to 2009 and from 2019 to 2024. He is the first Chief Minister of Odisha from the BJP, and he previously served as the chief whip of the BJP in the Odisha assembly from 2019 to 2024. In the year 1997, he entered politics as a Sarpanch.

== Early and personal life ==
Mohan Charan Majhi was born on 6 January 1972 in Raikala village of Keonjhar district. His father Gunaram Majhi worked as a peon in a Govt secondary school. His family belongs to the Santal tribal community. He did his schooling from Jhumpura High School in 1987 and completed his higher secondary from Anadapur College in 1990. He obtained a bachelor of arts degree from Chandra Sekhar College, Champua and LLB from Dhenkanal Law College. He worked as a teacher (Guruji) at Saraswati Shishu Mandir in Jhumpura, part of a network of schools run by Rashtriya Swayamsevak Sangh (RSS). He is married to Priyanka Marandi.

== Political career ==
Majhi served as a village sarpanch of Raikala panchayat from 1997 till 2000. He served as the secretary of the tribal wing of the state unit of the Bharatiya Janata Party (BJP) from 1997. Majhi was elected to the Odisha Legislative Assembly for the first time from Keonjhar in 2000. He was re-elected in 2004 and served as the deputy chief whip of the government from 2005 to 2009. Majhi lost the assembly elections in 2009 and 2014, but won from the same constituency in 2019. With the BJP becoming the principal opposition party, Majhi was appointed the party's chief whip. He was also a member of standing committee of scheduled castes and tribes and the chairperson of the Public Accounts Committee in the State from 2022 to 2024.

On 10 October 2021, two crude bombs were hurled at Majhi's car near Mandua in Kendujhar district. There was minor damage to his car while Majhi himself escaped without injuries. In September 2023, Majhi was suspended from the Odisha assembly by then speaker Pramila Mallik for throwing dal on her podium, while protesting against the alleged scam in procurement of various pulses by the government.

== Chief Ministership (2024-present) ==
In the 2024 assembly elections, Majhi won the Keonjhar seat for the fourth time. The BJP secured a majority with 79 of 147 seats in the Odisha assembly, and Majhi was appointed Chief Minister of Odisha on 11 June 2024. He was sworn in as the 15th Chief Minister the following day, succeeding Naveen Patnaik, who had held the position since March 2000 and who had been the second longest-serving Chief Minister in India. Majhi was the first person from the Santal tribe community and the third person of tribal origin, after Hemananda Biswal and Giridhar Gamang, to become Chief Minister of Odisha.

== Electoral statistics ==
Year	Constituency	Votes	%	Result	Ref
2000	Keonjhar	51,449	59.08	Won	
2004	Keonjhar	46,146	40.14	Won	
2009	Keonjhar	29,202	24.29	Lost	
2014	Keonjhar	47,283	30.31	Lost	
2019	Keonjhar	72,760	42.10	Won	
2024	Keonjhar	87,815	47.05	Won	

Political offices
Preceded by Naveen Patnaik	Chief Minister of Odisha; 12 June 2024	Incumbent
