= 13th Orissa Legislative Assembly =

13th state legislature of the Indian state of Orissa

←	12th Assembly	14th Assembly	→
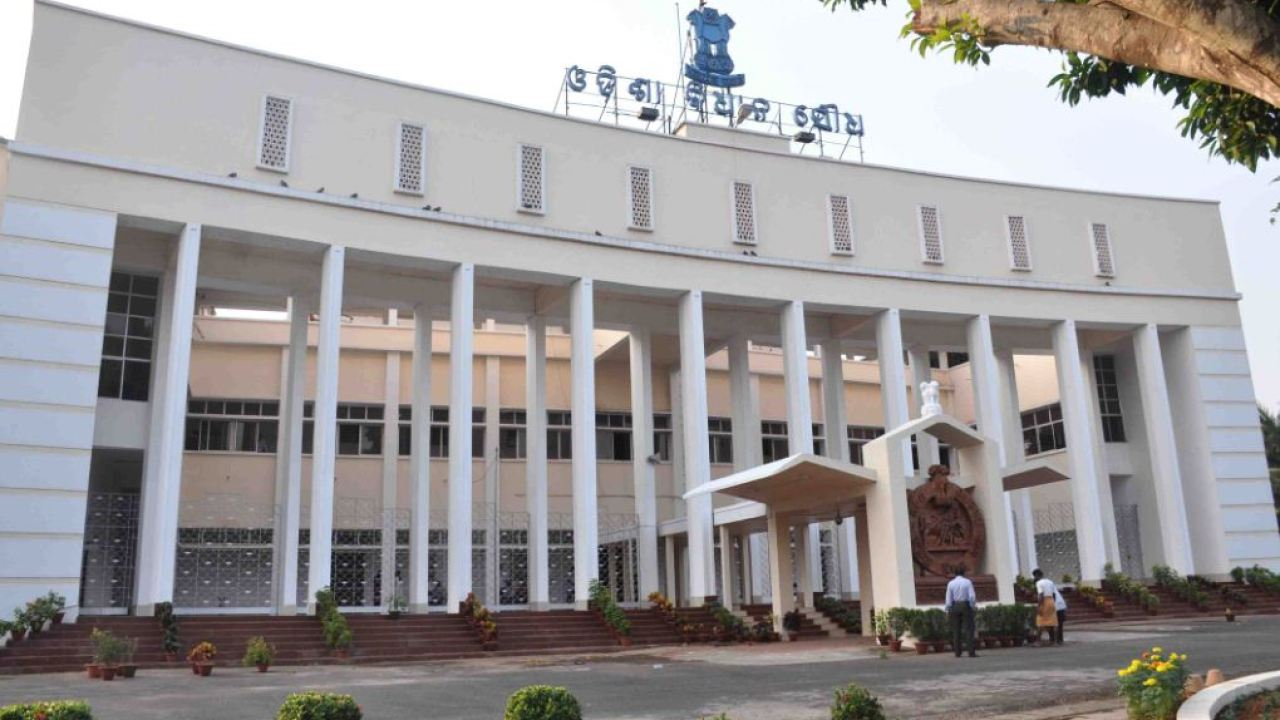
- Front view of Odisha Vidhan Saudha, Bhubaneshwar (2010)

Overview
- Meeting place: Odisha Vidhan Saudha, Bhubaneshwar, Orissa, India
- Term: 15 May 2004 – 19 May 2009
- Election: 2004 Orissa Legislative Assembly election
- Government: National Democratic Alliance; Biju Janata Dal; Bharatiya Janata Party
- Opposition: Indian National Congress
- Website: assembly.odisha.gov.in

Orissa Legislative Assembly
- House Composition as assembly begins
- Members: 147
- Governor: M. M. Rajendran; Rameshwar Thakur; Murlidhar Chandrakant Bhandare
- Speaker: Maheswar Mohanty, BJD; Prahlad Dora, BJP; Kishore Kumar Mohanty, BJD
- Deputy Speaker: Prahlad Dora, BJP
- Leader of the House (Chief Minister): Naveen Patnaik, BJD
- Leader of Opposition: Janaki Ballabh Patnaik, INC; Ramachandra Ulaka, INC
- Party control: National Democratic Alliance (93/147)
- 16 Sessions with 264 Sittings

The Thirteenth Orissa Legislative Assembly was convened after 2004 Orissa Legislative Assembly election. National Democratic Alliance led by Naveen Patnaik formed government again.

== Brief history ==
Assembly was dissolved early almost a year ahead & election were called in line with 2004 Indian general election. NDA lost the general election but won 2004 Orissa Assembly election. Chief Minister Naveen Patnaik along with his council of minister were sworn in by Governor M. M. Rajendran on 16 May 2004. The BJD had the larger share of representation in the ministry with 14 ministers including the Chief Minister while the BJP had eight. Cabinet reshuffle took place on 17 May 2006 & 5 February 2008. Following 2008 Kandhamal violence & failure of seat-sharing talks, BJD broke its alliance with BJP. In protest, BJP left the government on 9 March 2009 and tried to pass a motion of no confidence against the govt. in the assembly, which the govt. of the day defended successfully following which assembly was dissolved. BJD decided to fight upcoming election independently with limited seat-sharing agreement with NCP, CPM & CPI and won the 2009 Orissa Assembly election with a landslide. Subsequently, Shri Patnaik resigned on 20 May 2009, paving way for the new govt.

== House Composition ==
Party	Strength
Biju Janata Dal	61
Indian National Congress	38
Bharatiya Janata Party	32
Jharkhand Mukti Morcha	4
Odisha Gana Parishad	2
Communist Party of India	1
Communist Party of India (Marxist)	1
Independent	8

== Office Bearers ==
Post	Portrait	Name	Tenure		Party
Governor		M. M. Rajendran	Assembly Begins	17 November 2004	N/A
Governor		Rameshwar Thakur	18 November 2004	21 August 2007	N/A
Governor		Murlidhar Chandrakant Bhandare	21 August 2007	Assembly Dissolves	N/A
Speaker		Maheswar Mohanty; MLA from Puri	21 May 2004	31 March 2008	Biju Janata Dal
Speaker		Prahlad Dora; MLA from Chitrakonda	31 March 2008	19 August 2008	Bharatiya Janata Party
Speaker		Kishore Kumar Mohanty; MLA from Jharsuguda	19 August 2008	25 May 2009	Biju Janata Dal
Deputy Speaker		Prahlad Dora; MLA from Chitrakonda	3 July 2004	19 May 2009	Bharatiya Janata Party
Leader of the House (Chief Minister); Leader of BJD Legislature Party		Naveen Patnaik; MLA from Hinjili	16 May 2004	20 May 2009	Biju Janata Dal
Minister for Parliamentary Affairs		Padmanabha Behera; MLA from Phulbani	16 May 2004	16 May 2006	Biju Janata Dal
Minister for Parliamentary Affairs		Raghunath Mohanty; MLA from Basta	17 May 2006	20 May 2009	Biju Janata Dal
Leader of Opposition; Leader of Congress Legislature Party		Janaki Ballabh Patnaik; MLA from Begunia	4 June 2004	24 January 2009	Indian National Congress
Leader of Opposition; Leader of Congress Legislature Party		Ramachandra Ulaka; MLA from Rayagada	24 January 2009	19 May 2009	Indian National Congress
Pro tem Speaker		Habibulla Khan; MLA from Nowrangpur	18 May 2004	20 May 2004	Indian National Congress

== Council of Ministers ==
Source
Portfolio	Portrait	Name	Tenure		Party
Chief Minister; Home; General Administration; Forest & Environment; Other departments not allocated to any Minister.		Naveen Patnaik; MLA from Hinjili	16 May 2004	20 May 2009	BJD
Planning & Coordination		Naveen Patnaik; MLA from Hinjili	16 May 2004	16 May 2006	BJD
Water Resources		Naveen Patnaik; MLA from Hinjili	23 March 2006	20 May 2009	BJD
Information & Public Relations; Sports & Youth Services		Naveen Patnaik; MLA from Hinjili	5 May 2008	20 May 2009	BJD
Revenue; Food Supplies & Consumer Welfare		Naveen Patnaik; MLA from Hinjili	10 December 2008	20 May 2009	BJD
Industries; Rural Development; Law; Public Grievances & Pension Administration; Higher Education; Urban Development; Public Enterprises; Fisheries & Animal Resources Development; Textiles & Handlooms; Co-operation; Commerce and Transport; Labour & Employment		Naveen Patnaik; MLA from Hinjili	9 March 2009	20 May 2009	BJD
Cabinet Minister
Agriculture		Surendra Nath Naik; MLA from Kakatpur	16 May 2004	20 May 2009	BJD
Women & Child Development		Pramila Mallik; MLA from Binjharpur	16 May 2004	20 May 2009	BJD
Finance		Prafulla Chandra Ghadei; MLA from Sukinda	16 May 2004	20 May 2009	BJD
Housing; Works		Ananga Udaya Singh Deo; MLA from Bolangir	16 May 2004	20 May 2009	BJD
Health & Family Welfare		Bijayshree Routray; MLA from Basudevpur	16 May 2004	16 May 2006	BJD
Energy; Information Technology		Surjya Narayan Patro; MLA from Mohana	16 May 2004	20 May 2009	BJD
Tourism		Surjya Narayan Patro; MLA from Mohana	16 May 2004	16 May 2006	BJD
Tourism		Debiprasad Mishra; MLA from Baramba	5 February 2008	20 May 2009	BJD
Culture		Damodar Rout; MLA from Ersama	16 May 2004	16 May 2006	BJD
Culture		Surjya Narayan Patro; MLA from Mohana	17 May 2006	20 May 2009	BJD
Panchayati Raj		Damodar Rout; MLA from Ersama	16 May 2004	16 May 2006	BJD
Panchayati Raj		Raghunath Mohanty; MLA from Basta	17 May 2006	20 May 2009	BJD
Steel & Mines		Padmanabha Behera; MLA from Phulbani	16 May 2004	29 December 2007	BJD
Parliamentary Affairs		Padmanabha Behera; MLA from Phulbani	16 May 2004	16 May 2006	BJD
Parliamentary Affairs		Raghunath Mohanty; MLA from Basta	17 May 2006	20 May 2009	BJD
Planning & Coordination		Padmanabha Behera; MLA from Phulbani	17 May 2006	4 February 2008	BJD
Planning & Coordination		Duryodhan Majhi; MLA from Khariar	5 February 2008	20 May 2009	BJD
Science & Technology		Duryodhan Majhi; MLA from Khariar	5 February 2008	20 May 2009	BJD
Schedule Castes Development; Minorities & Backward Classes Welfare		Kalindi Behera; MLA from Salipur	16 May 2004	16 May 2006	BJD
Excise		Kalindi Behera; MLA from Salipur	16 May 2004	16 May 2006	BJD
Excise		Debiprasad Mishra; MLA from Baramba	5 February 2008	20 May 2009	BJD
Schedule Tribes & Schedule Castes Development; Minorities & Backward Classes Welfare		Chaitanya Prasad Majhi; MLA from Bangriposi	17 May 2006	20 May 2009	BJD
School & Mass Education		Bishnu Charan Das; MLA from Jagatsinghpur	17 May 2006	12 August 2007	BJD
Industries; Rural Development; Law		Biswabhusan Harichandan; MLA from Bhubaneswar	16 May 2004	9 March 2009	BJP
Public Grievances & Pension Administration; Higher Education		Samir Dey; MLA from Cuttack City	16 May 2004	9 March 2009	BJP
Urban Development; Public Enterprises		Kanak Vardhan Singh Deo; MLA from Patnagarh	16 May 2004	9 March 2009	BJP
Fisheries & Animal Resources Development; Textiles & Handlooms		Golak Bihari Naik; MLA from Khunta	16 May 2004	9 March 2009	BJP
Revenue; Food Supplies & Consumer Welfare		Manmohan Samal; MLA from Dhamnagar	16 May 2004	10 December 2008	BJP
Ministers of State with Independent Charges
Information & Public Relations; Sports & Youth Services		Debasis Nayak; MLA from Bari-Derabisi	16 May 2004	4 May 2008	BJD
Schedule Tribes Development		Balabhadra Majhi; MLA from Narla	16 May 2004	16 May 2006	BJD
Water Resources		Rabi Narayan Nanda; MLA from Jeypore	16 May 2004	23 March 2006	BJD
Science & Technology		Rabi Narayan Nanda; MLA from Jeypore	16 May 2004	23 March 2006	BJD
Science & Technology		Sanjeeb Kumar Sahoo; MLA from Birmaharajpur	17 May 2006	4 February 2008	BJD
School & Mass Education		Nagendra Kumar Pradhan; MLA from Athmallik	16 May 2004	16 May 2006	BJD
School & Mass Education		Sanjeeb Kumar Sahoo; MLA from Birmaharajpur	13 August 2007	20 May 2009	BJD
Health & Family Welfare		Duryodhan Majhi; MLA from Khariar	17 May 2006	4 February 2008	BJD
Health & Family Welfare		Sanatan Bisi; MLA from Rairakhol	5 February 2008	20 May 2009	BJD
Excise; Tourism		Debiprasad Mishra; MLA from Baramba	17 May 2006	4 February 2008	BJD
Steel & Mines		Pradip Kumar Amat; MLA from Boudh	5 February 2008	20 May 2009	BJD
Co-operation		Surama Padhy; MLA from Ranpur	16 May 2004	9 March 2009	BJP
Commerce and Transport		Jayanarayan Mishra; MLA from Sambalpur	16 May 2004	9 March 2009	BJP
Labour & Employment		Jayanarayan Mishra; MLA from Sambalpur	29 April 2006	4 February 2008	BJP
Labour & Employment		Pradipta Kumar Naik; MLA from Bhawanipatna	16 May 2004	29 April 2006	BJP
Labour & Employment		Pradipta Kumar Naik; MLA from Bhawanipatna	5 February 2008	9 March 2009	BJP

== Members of Legislative Assembly ==
Source
District	AC. No.	Constituency	Member	Party	Remarks
Mayurbhanj	1	Karanjia (ST)	Ajit Hembram	Biju Janata Dal	
Mayurbhanj	2	Jashipur (ST)	Shambhu Nath Naik	Independent	
Mayurbhanj	3	Bahalda (ST)	Prahlad Purty	Jharkhand Mukti Morcha	
Mayurbhanj	4	Rairangpur (ST)	Droupadi Murmu	Bharatiya Janata Party	
Mayurbhanj	5	Bangriposi (ST)	Chaitanya Prasad Majhi	Biju Janata Dal	Cabinet Minister
Mayurbhanj	6	Kuliana (ST)	Sananda Marndi	Bharatiya Janata Party	
Mayurbhanj	7	Baripada	Bimal Lochan Das	Jharkhand Mukti Morcha	
Mayurbhanj	8	Baisinga (ST)	Pramila Giri	Bharatiya Janata Party	
Mayurbhanj	9	Khunta (ST)	Golak Bihari Naik	Bharatiya Janata Party	Cabinet Minister
Mayurbhanj	10	Udala (ST)	Bhaskar Madhei	Bharatiya Janata Party	
Balasore	11	Bhograi	Ananta Das	Biju Janata Dal	
Balasore	12	Jaleswar	Aswini Kumar Patra	Bharatiya Janata Party	
Balasore	13	Basta	Raghunath Mohanty	Biju Janata Dal	Cabinet Minister
Balasore	14	Balasore	Arun Dey	Odisha Gana Parishad	
Balasore	15	Soro	Kartik Mohapatra	Indian National Congress	
Balasore	16	Simulia	Padma Lochan Panda	Indian National Congress	
Balasore	17	Nilgiri	Pratap Chandra Sarangi	Bharatiya Janata Party	
Bhadrak	18	Bhandaripokhari (SC)	Ananta Prasad Sethi	Indian National Congress	
Bhadrak	19	Bhadrak	Naren Pallai	Indian National Congress	
Bhadrak	20	Dhamnagar	Manmohan Samal	Bharatiya Janata Party	Cabinet Minister
Bhadrak	21	Chandbali (SC)	Netrananda Mallick	Indian National Congress	
Bhadrak	22	Basudevpur	Bijayshree Routray	Biju Janata Dal	Cabinet Minister
Jajpur	23	Sukinda	Prafulla Chandra Ghadai	Biju Janata Dal	Cabinet Minister
Jajpur	24	Korai	Sanchita Mohanty	Bharatiya Janata Party	
Jajpur	25	Jajpur (SC)	Parameswar Sethi	Biju Janata Dal	
Jajpur	26	Dharamsala	Kalpataru Das	Biju Janata Dal	
Jajpur	27	Barchana	Sitakanta Mohapatra	Indian National Congress	
Jajpur	28	Bari-Derabisi	Debasis Nayak	Biju Janata Dal	Minister of State (I/C)
Jajpur	29	Binjharpur (SC)	Pramila Mallik	Biju Janata Dal	Cabinet Minister
Kendrapara	30	Aul	Pratap Keshari Deb	Biju Janata Dal	
Kendrapara	31	Patamundai (SC)	Kishor Chandra Tarai	Biju Janata Dal	
Kendrapara	32	Rajnagar	Nalinikanta Mohanty	Indian National Congress	
Kendrapara	33	Kendrapara	Utkal Keshari Parida	Odisha Gana Parishad	
Kendrapara	34	Patkura	Atanu Sabyasachi Nayak	Biju Janata Dal	
Jagatsinghpur	35	Tirtol	Chiranjib Biswal	Indian National Congress	
Jagatsinghpur	36	Ersama	Damodar Rout	Biju Janata Dal	Cabinet Minister
Jagatsinghpur	37	Balikuda	Umesh Chandra Swain	Indian National Congress	
Jagatsinghpur	38	Jagatsinghpur (SC)	Bishnu Charan Das	Biju Janata Dal	Cabinet Minister
Cuttack	39	Kissannagar	Pratap Jena	Biju Janata Dal	
Cuttack	40	Mahanga	Bikram Keshari Barma	Biju Janata Dal	
Cuttack	41	Salepur (SC)	Kalindi Behera	Biju Janata Dal	Cabinet Minister
Cuttack	42	Gobindpur	Rabindra Kumar Mallick	Indian National Congress	
Cuttack	43	Cuttack Sadar	Pravata Ranjan Biswal	Independent	
Cuttack	44	Cuttack City	Samir Dey	Bharatiya Janata Party	Cabinet Minister
Cuttack	45	Choudwar	Dharmananda Behera	Biju Janata Dal	
Cuttack	46	Banki	Debasis Pattnaik	Indian National Congress	
Cuttack	47	Athgarh	Ranendra Pratap Swain	Biju Janata Dal	
Cuttack	48	Baramba	Debiprasad Mishra	Biju Janata Dal	Cabinet Minister
Khurda	49	Balipatna (SC)	Shashi Bhusan Behera	Biju Janata Dal	
Khurda	50	Bhubaneswar	Biswabhusan Harichandan	Bharatiya Janata Party	Cabinet Minister
Khurda	51	Jatni	Sarat Patkaray	Biju Janata Dal	
Puri	52	Pipli	Pradeep Maharathy	Biju Janata Dal	
Puri	53	Nimapara (SC)	Baidhar Mallick	Bharatiya Janata Party	
Puri	54	Kakatpur	Surendra Nath Naik	Biju Janata Dal	Cabinet Minister
Puri	55	Satyabadi	Ramaranjan Baliarsingh	Independent	
Puri	56	Puri	Maheswar Mohanty	Biju Janata Dal	Speaker
Puri	57	Brahmagiri	Lalatendu Bidyadhar Mohapatra	Indian National Congress	
Khurda	58	Chilka	Bibhuti Bhusan Harichandan	Bharatiya Janata Party	
Khurda	59	Khurda	Jyotirindra Nath Mitra	Biju Janata Dal	
Khurda	60	Begunia	Janaki Ballabh Patnaik	Indian National Congress	Leader of Opposition
Nayagarh	61	Ranpur	Surama Padhy	Bharatiya Janata Party	Minister of State (I/C)
Nayagarh	62	Nayagarh	Arun Kumar Sahoo	Biju Janata Dal	
Nayagarh	63	Khandapara	Bijayalaxmi Pattnaik	Independent	
Nayagarh	64	Daspalla	Rudra Madhab Ray	Independent	
Ganjam	65	Jaganathprasad (SC)	Madhaba Nanda Behera	Biju Janata Dal	
Ganjam	66	Bhanjanagar	Bikram Keshari Arukha	Biju Janata Dal	Govt. Chief Whip
Ganjam	67	Suruda	Kishore Chandra Singh Deo	Bharatiya Janata Party	
Ganjam	68	Aska	Saroj Kumar Padhi	Independent	
Ganjam	69	Kabisuryanagar	Ladu Kishore Swain	Biju Janata Dal	
Ganjam	70	Kodala	Niranjan Pradhan	Biju Janata Dal	
Ganjam	71	Khallikote	V. Sugnana Kumari Deo	Biju Janata Dal	
Ganjam	72	Chatrapur	Nagireddy Narayan Reddy	Communist Party of India	
Ganjam	73	Hinjili	Naveen Patnaik	Biju Janata Dal	Chief Minister
Ganjam	74	Gopalpur (SC)	Trinath Behera	Indian National Congress	
Ganjam	75	Berhampur	Ramesh Chandra Chyau Patnaik	Biju Janata Dal	
Ganjam	76	Chikiti	Usha Devi	Biju Janata Dal	
Gajapati	77	Mohana	Surjya Narayan Patro	Biju Janata Dal	Cabinet Minister
Gajapati	78	Ramagiri (ST)	Bharat Paik	Bharatiya Janata Party	
Gajapati	79	Parlakhemundi	Trinath Sahu	Indian National Congress	
Rayagada	80	Gunupur (ST)	Hemabati Gamang	Indian National Congress	
Rayagada	81	Bissam-cuttack (ST)	Dambarudhar Ulaka	Indian National Congress	
Rayagada	82	Rayagada (ST)	Ulaka Rama Chandra	Indian National Congress	Leader of Opposition
Koraput	83	Lakshmipur (ST)	Anantaram Majhi	Indian National Congress	Died on 25 November 2007.
Koraput	83	Lakshmipur (ST)	Purna Chandra Majhi	Indian National Congress	Won in 2008 Bypoll.
Koraput	84	Pottangi (ST)	Jayaram Pangi	Biju Janata Dal	
Koraput	85	Koraput	Tara Prasad Bahinipati	Indian National Congress	
Malkangiri	86	Malkangiri (SC)	Nimai Chandra Sarkar	Indian National Congress	
Malkangiri	87	Chitrakonda (ST)	Prahlad Dora	Bharatiya Janata Party	Deputy Speaker
Koraput	88	Kotpad (ST)	Basudev Majhi	Indian National Congress	
Koraput	89	Jeypore	Rabi Narayan Nanda	Biju Janata Dal	Minister of State (I/C)
Nowrangpur	90	Nowrangpur	Habibulla Khan	Indian National Congress	
Nowrangpur	91	Kodinga (ST)	Sadan Nayak	Indian National Congress	
Nowrangpur	92	Dabugam (ST)	Ramesh Chandra Majhi	Biju Janata Dal	
Nowrangpur	93	Umarkote (ST)	Dharmu Gond	Bharatiya Janata Party	
Nawapara	94	Nawapara	Rajendra Dholakia	Independent	
Nawapara	95	Khariar	Duryodhan Majhi	Biju Janata Dal	Cabinet Minister
Kalahandi	96	Dharamgarh (SC)	Bira Sipka	Biju Janata Dal	
Kalahandi	97	Koksara	Pushpendra Singh Deo	Biju Janata Dal	
Kalahandi	98	Junagarh	Himansu Sekhar Meher	Bharatiya Janata Party	
Kalahandi	99	Bhawanipatna (SC)	Pradipta Kumar Naik	Bharatiya Janata Party	Minister of State (I/C)
Kalahandi	100	Narla (ST)	Balabhadra Majhi	Biju Janata Dal	Minister of State (I/C)
Kalahandi	101	Kesinga	Dhaneswar Majhi	Bharatiya Janata Party	
Kandhamal	102	Balliguda (ST)	Karendra Majhi	Bharatiya Janata Party	
Kandhamal	103	Udayagiri (ST)	Ajayanti Pradhan	Indian National Congress	
Kandhamal	104	Phulbani (SC)	Padmanabha Behera	Biju Janata Dal	Cabinet Minister
Boudh	105	Boudh	Pradip Kumar Amat	Biju Janata Dal	Minister of State (I/C)
Balangir	106	Titilagarh (SC)	Jogendra Behera	Biju Janata Dal	
Balangir	107	Kantabanji	Haji Md. Ayub Khan	Independent	
Balangir	108	Patnagarh	Kanak Vardhan Singh Deo	Bharatiya Janata Party	Cabinet Minister
Balangir	109	Saintala	Kalikesh Narayan Singh Deo	Biju Janata Dal	
Balangir	110	Loisingha	Narasingha Mishra	Indian National Congress	
Balangir	111	Bolangir	Ananga Udaya Singh Deo	Biju Janata Dal	Cabinet Minister
Subarnapur	112	Sonepur (SC)	Binod Patra	Indian National Congress	
Subarnapur	113	Binka	Niranjan Pujari	Biju Janata Dal	
Subarnapur	114	Birmaharajpur	Sanjeeb Kumar Sahoo	Biju Janata Dal	Minister of State (I/C)
Angul	115	Athmallik	Nagendra Kumar Pradhan	Biju Janata Dal	Minister of State (I/C)
Angul	116	Angul	Rajanikant Singh	Biju Janata Dal	
Dhenkanal	117	Hindol (SC)	Anjali Behera	Biju Janata Dal	
Dhenkanal	118	Dhenkanal	Sudhir Kumar Samal	Indian National Congress	
Dhenkanal	119	Gondia	Saroj Kumar Samal	Biju Janata Dal	
Angul	120	Kamakhyanagar	Prafulla Kumar Mallik	Biju Janata Dal	
Angul	121	Pallahara	Nrusingha Charan Sahu	Indian National Congress	
Angul	122	Talcher (SC)	Mahesh Sahoo	Bharatiya Janata Party	
Bargarh	123	Padampur	Satya Bhusan Sahu	Indian National Congress	Cong. Chief Whip
Bargarh	124	Melchhamunda	Mohammad Rafique	Bharatiya Janata Party	
Bargarh	125	Bijepur	Subal Sahu	Indian National Congress	
Bargarh	126	Bhatli (SC)	Bimbadhar Kuanr	Bharatiya Janata Party	
Bargarh	127	Bargarh	Ananda Acharya	Biju Janata Dal	
Sambalpur	128	Sambalpur	Jayanarayan Mishra	Bharatiya Janata Party	Minister of State (I/C)
Jharsuguda	129	Brajarajnagar	Anup Kumar Sai	Indian National Congress	
Jharsuguda	130	Jharsuguda	Kishore Kumar Mohanty	Biju Janata Dal	Speaker
Jharsuguda	131	Laikera (ST)	Brundaban Majhi	Bharatiya Janata Party	
Sambalpur	132	Kuchinda (ST)	Rabi Narayan Naik	Bharatiya Janata Party	
Sambalpur	133	Rairakhol (SC)	Sanatan Bisi	Biju Janata Dal	Minister of State (I/C)
Deogarh	134	Deogarh	Nitesh Ganga Deb	Indian National Congress	
Sundergarh	135	Sundargarh	Shankarsan Naik	Bharatiya Janata Party	Deputy Govt. Chief Whip, Died on 11 January 2005.
Sundergarh	135	Sundargarh	Susama Patel	Bharatiya Janata Party	Won in 2005 Bypoll.
Sundergarh	136	Talsara (ST)	Gajadhar Majhi	Indian National Congress	Died on 20 May 2006.
Sundergarh	136	Talsara (ST)	Prafulla Majhi	Indian National Congress	Won in 2006 Bypoll.
Sundergarh	137	Rajgangpur (ST)	Gregory Minz	Indian National Congress	
Sundergarh	138	Biramitrapur (ST)	Nihar Surin	Jharkhand Mukti Morcha	
Sundergarh	139	Rourkela	Sarada Prasad Nayak	Biju Janata Dal	
Sundergarh	140	Raghunathpali (ST)	Halu Mundary	Jharkhand Mukti Morcha	
Sundergarh	141	Bonai (ST)	Laxman Munda	Communist Party of India (Marxist)	
Keonjhar	142	Champua (ST)	Dhanurjaya Sidu	Indian National Congress	
Keonjhar	143	Patna	Gourahari Naik	Bharatiya Janata Party	
Keonjhar	144	Keonjhar (ST)	Mohan Charan Majhi	Bharatiya Janata Party	Deputy Govt. Chief Whip
Keonjhar	145	Telkoi (ST)	Niladri Nayak	Biju Janata Dal	
Keonjhar	146	Ramchandrapur	Niranjan Patnaik	Indian National Congress	
Keonjhar	147	Anandapur (SC)	Jayadev Jena	Indian National Congress	

== Bypolls ==
Source
Year	Constituency	Reason for by-poll	Winning candidate	Party
April 2005	Sundargarh	Death of Shankarsan Naik	Sushma Patel	Bharatiya Janata Party
October 2006	Talsara (ST)	Death of Gajadhar Majhi	Prafulla Majhi	Indian National Congress
April 2008	Lakshmipur (ST)	Death of Anantaram Majhi	Purna Chandra Majhi	Indian National Congress
