= Second Naveen Patnaik ministry =

Government of Orissa (2004 – 2009)

- 26th Ministry of Orissa
- 2004 – 2009
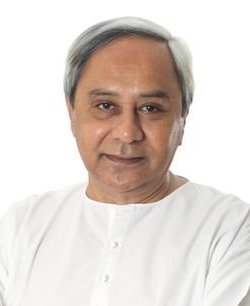
- Naveen Patnaik; Hon'ble Chief Minister of Orissa
- Date formed: 16 May 2004
- Date dissolved: 20 May 2009

People and organisations
- Governor: M. M. Rajendran; Rameshwar Thakur; Murlidhar Chandrakant Bhandare
- Chief Minister: Naveen Patnaik
- No. of ministers: 22
- Member parties: National Democratic Alliance 93; Biju Janata Dal 61; Bharatiya Janata Party 32
- Status in legislature: Majority
- Opposition party: Indian National Congress
- Opposition leader: Janaki Ballabh Patnaik (2004-2009); Ramachandra Ulaka (2009)

History
- Incoming formation: 13th Orissa Legislative Assembly
- Outgoing formation: 12th Orissa Legislative Assembly
- Election: 2004 Assembly election
- Legislature terms: 5 years, 4 days
- Predecessor: First Naveen Patnaik ministry
- Successor: Third Naveen Patnaik ministry

Naveen Patnaik was elected as the chief minister of Orissa for the second time in 2004 after NDA secured a landslide victory in the 2004 Orissa Legislative Assembly election. The elections were called early and were held in the state in two phases coinciding with 2004 Indian general election. The results were declared on 13 May 2004. NDA secured 93 seats out of 147 in the thirteenth Orissa Legislative Assembly. BJD secured 61 seats while BJP secured 32 seats, upsetting the Congress party which was led by former CM Janaki Ballabh Patnaik. This was a saving grace for the NDA as it lost the 2004 Indian general election.

== Brief history ==
Assembly was dissolved early almost a year ahead & election were called in line with 2004 Indian general election. NDA lost the general election but won 2004 Orissa Assembly election. Shri Patnaik resigned on 15 May 2004 paving way for new govt.

Chief Minister Naveen Patnaik along with 14 Cabinet Ministers and 7 Minister of State with Independent Charges were administered the oath of office and secrecy by Governor M. M. Rajendran at the Raj Bhavan, Bhubaneswar on 16 May 2004. The BJD had the larger share of representation in the ministry with 14 ministers including the Chief Minister while the BJP had eight.

The first Cabinet reshuffle took place on 17 May 2006 after the resignation of 3 ministers in the previous month. Second Cabinet reshuffle took place on 5 February 2008 where oath was administered by Governor Murlidhar Chandrakant Bhandare at the Raj Bhavan, Bhubaneswar.

Following 2008 Kandhamal violence & failure of seat-sharing talks, BJD broke its alliance with BJP. In protest, BJP left the government on 9 March 2009 and tried to pass a motion of no confidence against the govt. in the assembly, which the govt. of the day defended successfully following which assembly was dissolved.

BJD decided to fight upcoming election independently with limited seat-sharing agreement with NCP, CPM & CPI and won the 2009 Orissa Assembly election with a landslide. Subsequently, Shri Patnaik resigned on 20 May 2009, paving way for the new govt.

== Council of Ministers ==
Source
Portfolio	Portrait	Name	Tenure		Party
Chief Minister; Home; General Administration; Forest & Environment; Other departments not allocated to any Minister.		Naveen Patnaik; MLA from Hinjili	16 May 2004	20 May 2009	BJD
Planning & Coordination		Naveen Patnaik; MLA from Hinjili	16 May 2004	16 May 2006	BJD
Water Resources		Naveen Patnaik; MLA from Hinjili	23 March 2006	20 May 2009	BJD
Information & Public Relations; Sports & Youth Services		Naveen Patnaik; MLA from Hinjili	5 May 2008	20 May 2009	BJD
Revenue; Food Supplies & Consumer Welfare		Naveen Patnaik; MLA from Hinjili	10 December 2008	20 May 2009	BJD
Industries; Rural Development; Law; Public Grievances & Pension Administration; Higher Education; Urban Development; Public Enterprises; Fisheries & Animal Resources Development; Textiles & Handlooms; Co-operation; Commerce and Transport; Labour & Employment		Naveen Patnaik; MLA from Hinjili	9 March 2009	20 May 2009	BJD
Cabinet Minister
Agriculture		Surendra Nath Naik; MLA from Kakatpur	16 May 2004	20 May 2009	BJD
Women & Child Development		Pramila Mallik; MLA from Binjharpur	16 May 2004	20 May 2009	BJD
Finance		Prafulla Chandra Ghadei; MLA from Sukinda	16 May 2004	20 May 2009	BJD
Housing; Works		Ananga Udaya Singh Deo; MLA from Bolangir	16 May 2004	20 May 2009	BJD
Health & Family Welfare		Bijayshree Routray; MLA from Basudevpur	16 May 2004	16 May 2006	BJD
Energy; Information Technology		Surjya Narayan Patro; MLA from Mohana	16 May 2004	20 May 2009	BJD
Tourism		Surjya Narayan Patro; MLA from Mohana	16 May 2004	16 May 2006	BJD
Tourism		Debiprasad Mishra; MLA from Baramba	5 February 2008	20 May 2009	BJD
Culture		Damodar Rout; MLA from Ersama	16 May 2004	16 May 2006	BJD
Culture		Surjya Narayan Patro; MLA from Mohana	17 May 2006	20 May 2009	BJD
Panchayati Raj		Damodar Rout; MLA from Ersama	16 May 2004	16 May 2006	BJD
Panchayati Raj		Raghunath Mohanty; MLA from Basta	17 May 2006	20 May 2009	BJD
Steel & Mines		Padmanabha Behera; MLA from Phulbani	16 May 2004	29 December 2007	BJD
Parliamentary Affairs		Padmanabha Behera; MLA from Phulbani	16 May 2004	16 May 2006	BJD
Parliamentary Affairs		Raghunath Mohanty; MLA from Basta	17 May 2006	20 May 2009	BJD
Planning & Coordination		Padmanabha Behera; MLA from Phulbani	17 May 2006	4 February 2008	BJD
Planning & Coordination		Duryodhan Majhi; MLA from Khariar	5 February 2008	20 May 2009	BJD
Science & Technology		Duryodhan Majhi; MLA from Khariar	5 February 2008	20 May 2009	BJD
Schedule Castes Development; Minorities & Backward Classes Welfare		Kalindi Behera; MLA from Salipur	16 May 2004	16 May 2006	BJD
Excise		Kalindi Behera; MLA from Salipur	16 May 2004	16 May 2006	BJD
Excise		Debiprasad Mishra; MLA from Baramba	5 February 2008	20 May 2009	BJD
Schedule Tribes & Schedule Castes Development; Minorities & Backward Classes Welfare		Chaitanya Prasad Majhi; MLA from Bangriposi	17 May 2006	20 May 2009	BJD
School & Mass Education		Bishnu Charan Das; MLA from Jagatsinghpur	17 May 2006	12 August 2007	BJD
Industries; Rural Development; Law		Biswabhusan Harichandan; MLA from Bhubaneswar	16 May 2004	9 March 2009	BJP
Public Grievances & Pension Administration; Higher Education		Samir Dey; MLA from Cuttack City	16 May 2004	9 March 2009	BJP
Urban Development; Public Enterprises		Kanak Vardhan Singh Deo; MLA from Patnagarh	16 May 2004	9 March 2009	BJP
Fisheries & Animal Resources Development; Textiles & Handlooms		Golak Bihari Naik; MLA from Khunta	16 May 2004	9 March 2009	BJP
Revenue; Food Supplies & Consumer Welfare		Manmohan Samal; MLA from Dhamnagar	16 May 2004	10 December 2008	BJP
Ministers of State with Independent Charges
Information & Public Relations; Sports & Youth Services		Debasis Nayak; MLA from Bari-Derabisi	16 May 2004	4 May 2008	BJD
Schedule Tribes Development		Balabhadra Majhi; MLA from Narla	16 May 2004	16 May 2006	BJD
Water Resources		Rabi Narayan Nanda; MLA from Jeypore	16 May 2004	23 March 2006	BJD
Science & Technology		Rabi Narayan Nanda; MLA from Jeypore	16 May 2004	23 March 2006	BJD
Science & Technology		Sanjeeb Kumar Sahoo; MLA from Birmaharajpur	17 May 2006	4 February 2008	BJD
School & Mass Education		Nagendra Kumar Pradhan; MLA from Athmallik	16 May 2004	16 May 2006	BJD
School & Mass Education		Sanjeeb Kumar Sahoo; MLA from Birmaharajpur	13 August 2007	20 May 2009	BJD
Health & Family Welfare		Duryodhan Majhi; MLA from Khariar	17 May 2006	4 February 2008	BJD
Health & Family Welfare		Sanatan Bisi; MLA from Rairakhol	5 February 2008	20 May 2009	BJD
Excise; Tourism		Debiprasad Mishra; MLA from Baramba	17 May 2006	4 February 2008	BJD
Steel & Mines		Pradip Kumar Amat; MLA from Boudh	5 February 2008	20 May 2009	BJD
Co-operation		Surama Padhy; MLA from Ranpur	16 May 2004	9 March 2009	BJP
Commerce and Transport		Jayanarayan Mishra; MLA from Sambalpur	16 May 2004	9 March 2009	BJP
Labour & Employment		Jayanarayan Mishra; MLA from Sambalpur	29 April 2006	4 February 2008	BJP
Labour & Employment		Pradipta Kumar Naik; MLA from Bhawanipatna	16 May 2004	29 April 2006	BJP
Labour & Employment		Pradipta Kumar Naik; MLA from Bhawanipatna	5 February 2008	9 March 2009	BJP

== Demographics ==
Division	District	Ministers	Cabinet Ministers	Ministers of State
Northern	Angul	1	–	Nagendra Kumar Pradhan
Northern	Balangir	2	Ananga Udaya Singh Deo; Kanak Vardhan Singh Deo	–
Northern	Bargarh	0	–	–
Northern	Dhenkanal	0	–	–
Northern	Deogarh	0	–	–
Northern	Jharsuguda	0	–	–
Northern	Keonjhar	0	–	–
Northern	Subarnapur	1	–	Sanjeeb Kumar Sahoo
Northern	Sambalpur	2	–	Jayanarayan Mishra; Sanatan Bisi
Northern	Sundergarh	0	–	–
Central	Balasore	1	Raghunath Mohanty	–
Central	Bhadrak	2	Bijayshree Routray; Manmohan Samal	–
Central	Cuttack	3	Kalindi Behera; Samir Dey	Debi Prasad Mishra
Central	Jagatsinghpur	2	Damodar Rout; Bishnu Charan Das	–
Central	Jajpur	3	Prafulla Chandra Ghadei; Pramila Mallik	Debasis Nayak
Central	Khorda	1	Biswabhusan Harichandan	–
Central	Kendrapara	0	–	–
Central	Mayurbhanj	2	Chaitanya Prasad Majhi; Golak Bihari Naik	–
Central	Nayagarh	1	–	Surama Padhy
Central	Puri	1	Surendra Nath Naik	–
Southern	Boudh	1	–	Pradip Kumar Amat
Southern	Gajapati	0	–	–
Southern	Ganjam	2	Naveen Patnaik (Chief Minister); Surjya Narayan Patro	–
Southern	Kalahandi	2	–	Balabhadra Majhi; Pradipta Kumar Naik
Southern	Kandhamal	0		–
Southern	Koraput	0	–	–
Southern	Malkangiri	0	–	–
Southern	Nabarangpur	0	–	–
Southern	Nuapada	1	Duryodhan Majhi	–
Southern	Rayagada	1	–	Rabi Narayan Nanda
