= 12th Orissa Legislative Assembly =

12th state legislature of the Indian state of Orissa

←	11th Assembly	13th Assembly	→
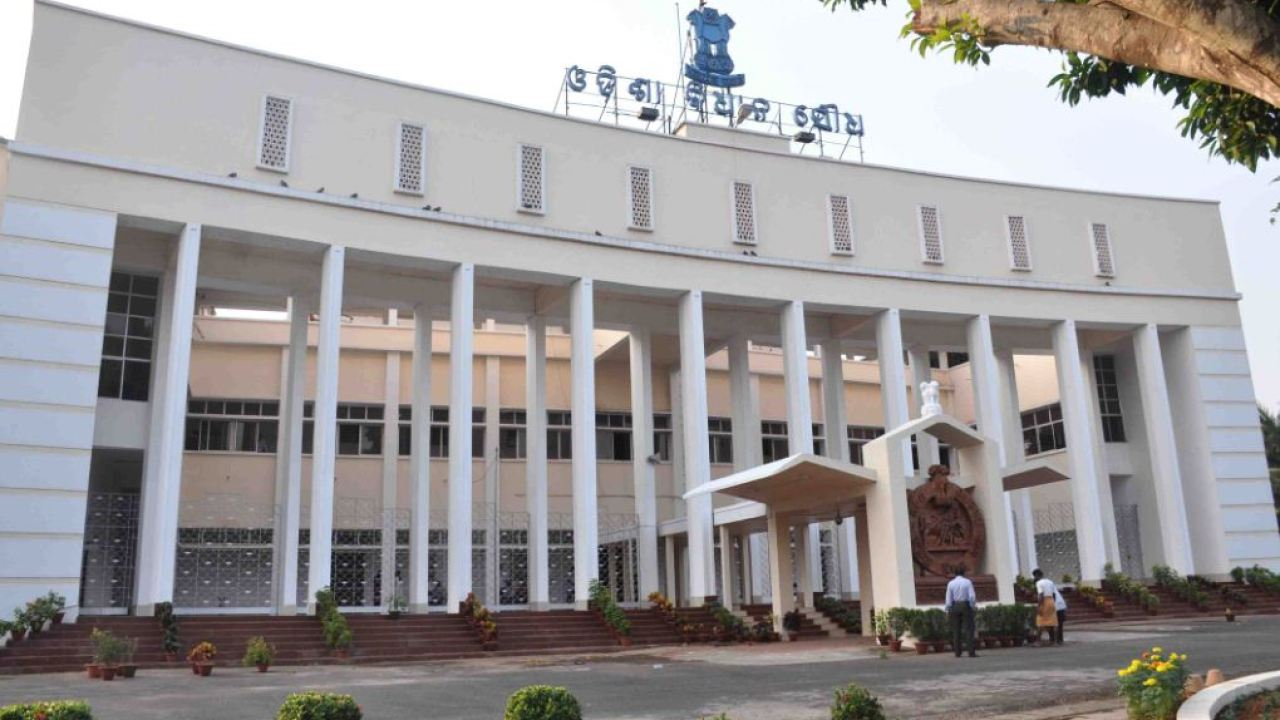
- Front view of Odisha Vidhan Saudha, Bhubaneshwar (2010)

Overview
- Meeting place: Odisha Vidhan Saudha, Bhubaneshwar, Orissa, India
- Term: 22 March 2000 – 6 February 2004
- Election: 2000 Orissa Legislative Assembly election
- Government: National Democratic Alliance; Biju Janata Dal; Bharatiya Janata Party
- Opposition: Indian National Congress
- Website: assembly.odisha.gov.in

Orissa Legislative Assembly
- House Composition as assembly begins
- Members: 147
- Governor: M. M. Rajendran
- Speaker: Sarat Kumar Kar, BJD
- Deputy Speaker: Rama Chandra Panda, BJP
- Leader of the House (Chief Minister): Naveen Patnaik, BJD
- Leader of Opposition: Ramakanta Mishra, INC
- Party control: National Democratic Alliance (107/147)
- 13 Sessions with 214 Sittings

The Twelfth Orissa Legislative Assembly was convened after 2000 Orissa Legislative Assembly election. National Democratic Alliance led by Naveen Patnaik formed government for first time.

== Brief history ==
Due to poor handling of 1999 Odisha cyclone and rise in corruption & criminal cases etc. led to rise of unpopularity of Congress, which eventually led to their dismissal performance in 2000 election. Chief Minister Naveen Patnaik along with his council of ministers were sworn in by Governor M. M. Rajendran on 5 March 2000. The BJD had the larger share of representation in the ministry with 16 ministers including the Chief Minister while the BJP had 9. Cabinet reshuffle took place on 6 August 2002 with induction of 8 new ministers. Assembly was dissolved early almost a year ahead & election were called in line with 2004 Indian general election. NDA lost the general election but won 2004 Orissa Assembly election. Shri Patnaik resigned on 15 May 2004 paving way for new govt.

== House Composition ==
Party	Strength	
Party	Assembly Begins	Assembly Dissolves
Biju Janata Dal	68	69
Bharatiya Janata Party	38	38
Indian National Congress	26	25
Jharkhand Mukti Morcha	3	2
Communist Party of India	1	1
Communist Party of India (Marxist)	1	1
Janata Dal (Secular)	1	1
All India Trinamool Congress	1	0
Independent	8	10

== Office Bearers ==
Post	Portrait	Name	Tenure		Party
Governor		M. M. Rajendran	Assembly Begins	Assembly Dissolves	N/A
Speaker		Sarat Kumar Kar; MLA from Mahanga	10 March 2000	21 May 2004	Biju Janata Dal
Deputy Speaker		Rama Chandra Panda; MLA from Chhatrapur	27 March 2000	6 February 2004	Bharatiya Janata Party
Leader of the House (Chief Minister); Leader of BJD Legislature Party		Naveen Patnaik; MLA from Hinjili	5 March 2000	15 May 2004	Biju Janata Dal
Minister for Parliamentary Affairs		Nalinikanta Mohanty; MLA from Rajanagar	5 March 2000	9 July 2001	Biju Janata Dal
Minister for Parliamentary Affairs		Naveen Patnaik; MLA from Hinjili; Chief Minister	9 July 2001	6 August 2002	Biju Janata Dal
Minister for Parliamentary Affairs		Panchanan Kanungo; MLA from Gobindpur	6 August 2002	15 May 2004	Biju Janata Dal
Leader of Opposition; Leader of Congress Legislature Party		Ramakanta Mishra; MLA from Ranpur	21 March 2000	6 February 2004	Indian National Congress
Pro tem Speaker		Habibulla Khan; MLA from Nowrangpur	6 March 2000	8 March 2000	Indian National Congress

== Council of Ministers ==
Source
Portfolio	Portrait	Name Constituency	Tenure		Party
Chief Minister; Home; General Administration; Agriculture; Other departments not allocated to any Minister.		Naveen Patnaik; MLA from Hinjili	5 March 2000	15 May 2004	BJD
Water Resources; Information Technology		Naveen Patnaik; MLA from Hinjili	5 March 2000	6 August 2002	BJD
Works; Housing; Parliamentary Affairs; Health & Family Welfare; Women & Child Development; Rural Development; Higher Education		Naveen Patnaik; MLA from Hinjili	9 July 2001	6 August 2002	BJD
School & Mass Education		Naveen Patnaik; MLA from Hinjili	3 June 2002	6 August 2002	BJD
Finance; Planning & Coordination		Naveen Patnaik; MLA from Hinjili	6 August 2002	15 May 2004	BJD
Cabinet Minister
Excise		Ananda Acharya; MLA from Bargarh	5 March 2000	15 May 2004	BJD
Housing; Parliamentary Affairs		Nalinikanta Mohanty; MLA from Rajanagar	5 March 2000	9 July 2001	BJD
Works		Nalinikanta Mohanty; MLA from Rajanagar	5 March 2000	9 July 2001	BJD
Works		Kalindi Behera; MLA from Salepur	6 August 2002	15 May 2004	BJD
Finance; Planning & Coordination		Ram Krushna Patnaik; MLA from Kodala	5 March 2000	6 August 2002	BJD
Health & Family Welfare; Women & Child Development		Kamala Das; MLA from Bhograi	5 March 2000	9 July 2001	BJD
Health & Family Welfare; Women & Child Development		Prafulla Chandra Ghadei; MLA from Sukinda	6 August 2002	15 May 2004	BJD
Forest; Environment		Adwait Prasad Singh; MLA from Angul	5 March 2000	6 August 2002	BJD
Panchayati Raj		Surendra Nath Naik; MLA from Kakatpur	5 March 2000	6 August 2002	BJD
Panchayati Raj		Damodar Rout; MLA from Ersama	6 August 2002	15 May 2004	BJD
Information & Public Relations; Culture		Damodar Rout; MLA from Ersama	6 August 2002	15 May 2004	BJD
School & Mass Education		Bhagabat Behera; MLA from Nayagarh	5 March 2000	3 June 2002	BJD
School & Mass Education		Surendra Nath Naik; MLA from Kakatpur	6 August 2002	15 May 2004	BJD
Steel & Mines		Ananga Udaya Singh Deo; MLA from Bolangir	5 March 2000	15 May 2004	BJD
Information Technology; Tourism		Ananga Udaya Singh Deo; MLA from Bolangir	6 August 2002	15 May 2004	BJD
Energy		Ananga Udaya Singh Deo; MLA from Bolangir	5 March 2000	6 August 2002	BJD
Energy		Surjya Narayan Patro; MLA from Mohana	6 August 2002	15 May 2004	BJD
Science & Technology; Environment		Surjya Narayan Patro; MLA from Mohana	6 August 2002	15 May 2004	BJD
Schedule Tribes & Schedule Castes Development; Minorities & Backward Classes Welfare		Mangala Kisan; MLA from Rajgangpur	5 March 2000	6 August 2002	BJD
Schedule Tribes & Schedule Castes Development; Minorities & Backward Classes Welfare		Kalindi Behera; MLA from Salipur	6 August 2002	15 May 2004	BJD
Water Resources		Mangala Kisan; MLA from Rajgangpur	6 August 2002	15 May 2004	BJD
Revenue; Law		Biswabhusan Harichandan; MLA from Bhubaneswar	5 March 2000	15 May 2004	BJP
Fisheries & Animal Resources Development		Biswabhusan Harichandan; MLA from Bhubaneswar	5 March 2000	6 August 2002	BJP
Food Supplies & Consumer Welfare		Bed Prakash Agarwal; MLA from Kendrapara	5 March 2000	15 May 2004	BJP
Public Enterprises		Bed Prakash Agarwal; MLA from Kendrapara	5 March 2000	6 August 2002	BJP
Rural Development		Bed Prakash Agarwal; MLA from Kendrapara	6 August 2002	15 May 2004	BJP
Public Grievances & Pension Administration; Urban Development		Samir Dey; MLA from Cuttack City	5 March 2000	15 May 2004	BJP
Industries		Kanak Vardhan Singh Deo; MLA from Patnagarh	5 March 2000	15 May 2004	BJP
Public Enterprises		Kanak Vardhan Singh Deo; MLA from Patnagarh	6 August 2002	15 May 2004	BJP
Co-operation		Arabinda Dhali; MLA from Malkangiri	5 March 2000	15 May 2004	BJP
Textiles & Handlooms		Arabinda Dhali; MLA from Malkangiri	5 March 2000	6 August 2002	BJP
Commerce and Transport		Arabinda Dhali; MLA from Malkangiri	6 August 2002	15 May 2004	BJP
Minister of State with Independent Charges
Sports & Youth Services		Ranendra Pratap Swain; MLA from Athagarh	5 March 2000	15 May 2004	BJD
Science & Technology		Ranendra Pratap Swain; MLA from Athagarh	5 March 2000	6 August 2002	BJD
Housing		Ranendra Pratap Swain; MLA from Athagarh	6 August 2002	15 May 2004	BJD
Tourism; Culture		Bijayshree Routray; MLA from Basudevpur	5 March 2000	6 August 2002	BJD
Forest		Bijayshree Routray; MLA from Basudevpur	6 August 2002	15 May 2004	BJD
Information & Public Relations		Duryodhan Majhi; MLA from Khariar	5 March 2000	6 August 2002	BJD
Parliamentary Affairs		Panchanan Kanungo; MLA from Gobindpur	6 August 2002	15 May 2004	BJD
Commerce and Transport		Droupadi Murmu; MLA from Rairangpur	5 March 2000	6 August 2002	BJP
Fisheries & Animal Resources Development		Droupadi Murmu; MLA from Rairangpur	6 August 2002	15 May 2004	BJP
Labour & Employment		Bimbadhar Kuanr; MLA from Bhatli	5 March 2000	6 August 2002	BJP
Labour & Employment		Himansu Sekhar Meher; MLA from Junagarh	6 August 2002	15 May 2004	BJP
Textiles & Handlooms		Himansu Sekhar Meher; MLA from Junagarh	6 August 2002	15 May 2004	BJP
Rural Development		Prashanta Nanda; MLA from Begunia	5 March 2000	9 July 2001	BJP
Higher Education		Prashanta Nanda; MLA from Begunia	5 March 2000	9 July 2001	BJP
Higher Education		Bimbadhar Kuanr; MLA from Bhatli	6 August 2002	15 May 2004	BJP
Minister of State
Food Supplies & Consumer Welfare		Rabi Narayan Nanda; MLA from Jeypore	5 March 2000	6 August 2002	BJD
Water Resources		Rabi Narayan Nanda; MLA from Jeypore	6 August 2002	15 May 2004	BJD
Health & Family Welfare		Debi Prasad Mishra; MLA from Baramba	5 March 2000	6 August 2002	BJD
Agriculture		Amar Prasad Satpathy; MLA from Barchana	5 March 2000	6 August 2002	BJD
Finance		Panchanan Kanungo; MLA from Gobindpur	6 August 2002	15 May 2004	BJD
Women & Child Development		Bishnu Priya Behera; MLA from Phulbani	6 August 2002	15 May 2004	BJD
Schedule Tribes & Schedule Castes Development; Minorities & Backward Classes Welfare		Balabhadra Majhi; MLA from Narla	6 August 2002	15 May 2004	BJD
Planning & Coordination		Golak Bihari Naik; MLA from Khunta	5 March 2000	6 August 2002	BJP
Public Grievances & Pension Administration		Golak Bihari Naik; MLA from Khunta	6 August 2002	15 May 2004	BJP

== Members of Legislative Assembly ==
Source
District	AC. No.	Constituency	Member	Party	Remarks
Mayurbhanj	1	Karanjia (ST)	Padma Charan Haiburu	Independent	
Mayurbhanj	2	Jashipur (ST)	Bhanu Charan Naik	Bharatiya Janata Party	
Mayurbhanj	3	Bahalda (ST)	Laxman Soren	Bharatiya Janata Party	
Mayurbhanj	4	Rairangpur (ST)	Droupadi Murmu	Bharatiya Janata Party	Minister of State (I/C)
Mayurbhanj	5	Bangriposi (ST)	Purusottama Naik	Independent	
Mayurbhanj	6	Kuliana (ST)	Sudam Marndi	Jharkhand Mukti Morcha	
Mayurbhanj	7	Baripada	Kishore Dash	Jharkhand Mukti Morcha	
Mayurbhanj	8	Baisinga (ST)	Kandra Soren	Bharatiya Janata Party	
Mayurbhanj	9	Khunta (ST)	Golaka Bihari Naik	Bharatiya Janata Party	Minister of State
Mayurbhanj	10	Udala (ST)	Bhaskara Madhei	Bharatiya Janata Party	
Balasore	11	Bhograi	Kamala Das	Biju Janata Dal	Cabinet Minister
Balasore	12	Jaleswar	Jayanarayan Mohanty	Indian National Congress	
Balasore	13	Basta	Raghunath Mohanty	Biju Janata Dal	
Balasore	14	Balasore	Jiban Pradip Dash	Bharatiya Janata Party	
Balasore	15	Soro	Kartik Mohapatra	Indian National Congress	
Balasore	16	Simulia	Parsuram Panigrahi	Biju Janata Dal	
Balasore	17	Nilgiri	Pradipta Panda	Communist Party of India (Marxist)	
Bhadrak	18	Bhandaripokhari (SC)	Ratha Das	Biju Janata Dal	
Bhadrak	19	Bhadrak	Biren Palei	Indian National Congress	Died on 2 March 2001
Bhadrak	19	Bhadrak	Prafulla Samal	Biju Janata Dal	Won in May 2002 Bypoll.
Bhadrak	20	Dhamnagar	Manas Ranjan Mallik	Independent	
Bhadrak	21	Chandbali (SC)	Bishnu Charan Sethi	Bharatiya Janata Party	
Bhadrak	22	Basudevpur	Bijayshree Routray	Biju Janata Dal	Minister of State (I/C)
Jajpur	23	Sukinda	Prafulla Chandra Ghadai	Biju Janata Dal	Cabinet Minister
Jajpur	24	Korai	Ashok Kumar Das	Janata Dal (Secular)	
Jajpur	25	Jajpur (SC)	Surjyamani Jena	Biju Janata Dal	
Jajpur	26	Dharamsala	Kalpataru Das	Biju Janata Dal	
Jajpur	27	Barchana	Amar Prasad Satpathy	Biju Janata Dal	Minister of State
Jajpur	28	Bari-Derabisi	Debasis Nayak	Biju Janata Dal	
Jajpur	29	Binjharpur (SC)	Pramila Mallik	Biju Janata Dal	
Kendrapara	30	Aul	Pratap Keshari Deb	Biju Janata Dal	
Kendrapara	31	Patamundai (SC)	Tapash Kumar Das	Biju Janata Dal	
Kendrapara	32	Rajnagar	Nalini Kanta Mohanty	Biju Janata Dal	Cabinet Minister, Expelled from Party on 19 July 2001.
Kendrapara	32	Rajnagar	Nalini Kanta Mohanty	Independent	Since 30 July 2001.
Kendrapara	33	Kendrapara	Bed Prakash Agarwal	Bharatiya Janata Party	Cabinet Minister
Kendrapara	34	Patkura	Trilochan Behera	All India Trinamool Congress	Merged with Biju Janata Dal party on 21 April 2001.
Kendrapara	34	Patkura	Trilochan Behera	Biju Janata Dal	
Jagatsinghpur	35	Tirtol	Debashish Samantaray	Biju Janata Dal	
Jagatsinghpur	36	Ersama	Damodar Rout	Biju Janata Dal	Cabinet Minister
Jagatsinghpur	37	Balikuda	Umesh Chandra Swain	Indian National Congress	
Jagatsinghpur	38	Jagatsinghpur (SC)	Bishnu Charan Das	Biju Janata Dal	
Cuttack	39	Kissannagar	Pratap Jena	Biju Janata Dal	
Cuttack	40	Mahanga	Sarat Kumar Kar	Biju Janata Dal	Speaker
Cuttack	41	Salepur (SC)	Kalindi Behera	Biju Janata Dal	Cabinet Minister
Cuttack	42	Gobindpur	Panchanan Kanungo	Biju Janata Dal	Minister of State (I/C)
Cuttack	43	Cuttack Sadar	Nibedita Pradhan	Bharatiya Janata Party	
Cuttack	44	Cuttack City	Samir Dey	Bharatiya Janata Party	Cabinet Minister
Cuttack	45	Choudwar	Bidhubhusan Praharaj	Independent	
Cuttack	46	Banki	Pravat Tripathy	Biju Janata Dal	
Cuttack	47	Athgarh	Ranendra Pratap Swain	Biju Janata Dal	Minister of State (I/C)
Cuttack	48	Baramba	Debi Prasad Mishra	Biju Janata Dal	Minister of State
Khurda	49	Balipatna (SC)	Raghaba Chandra Sethi	Biju Janata Dal	
Khurda	50	Bhubaneswar	Biswabhusan Harichandan	Bharatiya Janata Party	Cabinet Minister
Khurda	51	Jatni	Suresh Kumar Routray	Indian National Congress	
Puri	52	Pipli	Pradeep Maharathy	Biju Janata Dal	Govt. Chief Whip
Puri	53	Nimapara (SC)	Baidhar Malik	Bharatiya Janata Party	
Puri	54	Kakatpur	Surendra Nath Naik	Biju Janata Dal	Cabinet Minister
Puri	55	Satyabadi	Prasad Kumar Harichandan	Indian National Congress	
Puri	56	Puri	Maheswar Mohanty	Biju Janata Dal	
Puri	57	Brahmagiri	Lalatendu Bidyadhar Mohapatra	Indian National Congress	
Khurda	58	Chilka	Bibhuti Bhusan Harichandan	Bharatiya Janata Party	
Khurda	59	Khurda	Jyotirindra Nath Mitra	Independent	
Khurda	60	Begunia	Prashanta Nanda	Bharatiya Janata Party	Minister of State (I/C)
Nayagarh	61	Ranpur	Ramakanta Mishra	Indian National Congress	Leader of Oppposition
Nayagarh	62	Nayagarh	Bhagabat Behera	Biju Janata Dal	Cabinet Minister, Died on 3 June 2002.
Nayagarh	62	Nayagarh	Mandakini Behera	Biju Janata Dal	Won in July 2002 Bypoll.
Nayagarh	63	Khandapara	Bijayalaxmi Pattnaik	Biju Janata Dal	
Nayagarh	64	Daspalla	Hariharan Karan	Indian National Congress	
Ganjam	65	Jaganathprasad (SC)	Simanchala Behera	Indian National Congress	
Ganjam	66	Bhanjanagar	Bikram Keshari Arukha	Biju Janata Dal	
Ganjam	67	Suruda	Usha Rani Panda	Indian National Congress	
Ganjam	68	Aska	Debaraj Mohanty	Biju Janata Dal	
Ganjam	69	Kavisuryanagar	Nityananda Pradhan	Communist Party of India	
Ganjam	70	Kodala	Ram Krushna Patnaik	Biju Janata Dal	Cabinet Minister, Expelled from Party on 21 September 2002.
Ganjam	70	Kodala	Ram Krushna Patnaik	Independent	Since 10 October 2002.
Ganjam	71	Khallikote	V. Sugnana Kumari Deo	Biju Janata Dal	
Ganjam	72	Chatrapur	Rama Chandra Panda	Bharatiya Janata Party	Deputy Speaker
Ganjam	73	Hinjili	Naveen Patnaik	Biju Janata Dal	Chief Minister
Ganjam	74	Gopalpur (SC)	Rama Chandra Sethy	Biju Janata Dal	
Ganjam	75	Berhampur	Ramesh Chandra Chyau Patnaik	Biju Janata Dal	
Ganjam	76	Chikiti	Usha Devi	Biju Janata Dal	
Gajapati	77	Mohana	Surjya Narayan Patro	Biju Janata Dal	Cabinet Minister
Gajapati	78	Ramagiri (ST)	Haladhar Karji	Indian National Congress	
Gajapati	79	Parlakhemundi	Trinath Sahu	Indian National Congress	
Rayagada	80	Gunupur (ST)	Rammurthy Gamango	Bharatiya Janata Party	
Rayagada	81	Bissam-cuttack (ST)	Sarangadhar Kadraka	Biju Janata Dal	
Rayagada	82	Rayagada (ST)	Lal Bihari Himirika	Biju Janata Dal	
Koraput	83	Lakshmipur (ST)	Bibhisana Majhi	Biju Janata Dal	
Koraput	84	Pottangi (ST)	Jayaram Pangi	Biju Janata Dal	
Koraput	85	Koraput	Tara Prasad Bahinipati	Indian National Congress	
Malkangiri	86	Malkangiri (SC)	Arabinda Dhali	Bharatiya Janata Party	Cabinet Minister
Malkangiri	87	Chitrakonda (ST)	Mamta Madhi	Indian National Congress	
Koraput	88	Kotpad (ST)	Basudev Majhi	Indian National Congress	
Koraput	89	Jeypore	Rabi Narayan Nanda	Biju Janata Dal	Minister of State
Nowrangpur	90	Nowrangpur	Habibulla Khan	Indian National Congress	
Nowrangpur	91	Kodinga (ST)	Sadan Nayak	Indian National Congress	
Nowrangpur	92	Dabugam (ST)	Bhujabal Majhi	Indian National Congress	
Nowrangpur	93	Umarkote (ST)	Parama Pujari	Indian National Congress	
Nawapara	94	Nawapara	Basanta Kumar Panda	Bharatiya Janata Party	
Nawapara	95	Khariar	Duryodhan Majhi	Biju Janata Dal	Minister of State (I/C)
Kalahandi	96	Dharamgarh (SC)	Bira Sipka	Biju Janata Dal	
Kalahandi	97	Koksara	Rosni Singh Deo	Biju Janata Dal	
Kalahandi	98	Junagarh	Himansu Sekhar Meher	Bharatiya Janata Party	Minister of State (I/C)
Kalahandi	99	Bhawanipatna (SC)	Pradipta Kumar Naik	Bharatiya Janata Party	
Kalahandi	100	Narla (ST)	Balabhadra Majhi	Biju Janata Dal	Minister of State
Kalahandi	101	Kesinga	Dhaneswar Majhi	Bharatiya Janata Party	
Kandhamal	102	Balliguda (ST)	Surendra Kanhar	Bharatiya Janata Party	
Kandhamal	103	Udayagiri (ST)	Saluga Pradhan	Biju Janata Dal	
Kandhamal	104	Phulbani (SC)	Bishnu Priya Behera	Biju Janata Dal	Minister of State
Boudh	105	Boudh	Pradip Kumar Amat	Independent	
Balangir	106	Titilagarh (SC)	Jogendra Behera	Biju Janata Dal	
Balangir	107	Kantabanji	Santosh Singh Saluja	Indian National Congress	
Balangir	108	Patnagarh	Kanak Vardhan Singh Deo	Bharatiya Janata Party	Cabinet Minister
Balangir	109	Saintala	Surendra Singh Bhoi	Indian National Congress	
Balangir	110	Loisingha	Balgopal Mishra	Bharatiya Janata Party	
Balangir	111	Bolangir	Ananga Udaya Singh Deo	Biju Janata Dal	Cabinet Minister
Subarnapur	112	Sonepur (SC)	Kunduru Kushal	Biju Janata Dal	
Subarnapur	113	Binka	Niranjan Pujari	Biju Janata Dal	
Subarnapur	114	Birmaharajpur	Baishnaba Padhan	Biju Janata Dal	Died on 21 May 2003.
Subarnapur	114	Birmaharajpur	Sanjeeb Kumar Sahoo	Biju Janata Dal	Won in 2003 Bypoll.
Angul	115	Athmallik	Nagendra Kumar Pradhan	Biju Janata Dal	
Angul	116	Angul	Adwait Prasad Singh	Biju Janata Dal	Cabinet Minister
Dhenkanal	117	Hindol (SC)	Anjali Behera	Biju Janata Dal	
Dhenkanal	118	Dhenkanal	Krushna Chandra Patra	Bharatiya Janata Party	
Dhenkanal	119	Gondia	Nabin Nanda	Biju Janata Dal	
Angul	120	Kamakhyanagar	Brahmananda Biswal	Biju Janata Dal	
Angul	121	Pallahara	Dharmendra Pradhan	Bharatiya Janata Party	
Angul	122	Talcher (SC)	Mahesh Sahoo	Bharatiya Janata Party	
Bargarh	123	Padampur	Bijaya Ranjan Singh Bariha	Biju Janata Dal	
Bargarh	124	Melchhamunda	Prakash Chandra Debta	Indian National Congress	
Bargarh	125	Bijepur	Ashok Kumar Panigrahy	Biju Janata Dal	
Bargarh	126	Bhatli (SC)	Bimbadhar Kuanr	Bharatiya Janata Party	Minister of State (I/C)
Bargarh	127	Bargarh	Ananda Acharya	Biju Janata Dal	Cabinet Minister
Sambalpur	128	Sambalpur	Jayanarayan Mishra	Bharatiya Janata Party	Deputy Govt. Chief Whip
Jharsuguda	129	Brajarajnagar	Anup Kumar Sai	Indian National Congress	
Jharsuguda	130	Jharsuguda	Kishore Kumar Mohanty	Biju Janata Dal	
Jharsuguda	131	Laikera (ST)	Hemananda Biswal	Indian National Congress	
Sambalpur	132	Kuchinda (ST)	Rabi Narayan Naik	Bharatiya Janata Party	
Sambalpur	133	Rairakhol (SC)	Durjodhan Sohela	Biju Janata Dal	Died on 4 August 2001.
Sambalpur	133	Rairakhol (SC)	Sanatan Bisi	Biju Janata Dal	Won in 2001 Bypoll.
Deogarh	134	Deogarh	Subash Chandra Panigrahi	Bharatiya Janata Party	
Sundergarh	135	Sundargarh	Shankarsan Naik	Bharatiya Janata Party	
Sundergarh	136	Talsara (ST)	Gajadhar Majhi	Indian National Congress	
Sundergarh	137	Rajgangpur (ST)	Mangala Kisan	Biju Janata Dal	Cabinet Minister
Sundergarh	138	Biramitrapur (ST)	George Tirkey	Jharkhand Mukti Morcha	Joined Biju Janata Dal on 21 August 2001.
Sundergarh	138	Biramitrapur (ST)	George Tirkey	Biju Janata Dal	
Sundergarh	139	Rourkela	Ajit Das	Biju Janata Dal	
Sundergarh	140	Raghunathpali (ST)	Shankar Oram	Bharatiya Janata Party	
Sundergarh	141	Bonai (ST)	Dayanidhi Kisan	Bharatiya Janata Party	
Keonjhar	142	Champua (ST)	Saharai Oram	Independent	
Keonjhar	143	Patna	Gourahari Naik	Bharatiya Janata Party	
Keonjhar	144	Keonjhar (ST)	Mohan Charan Majhi	Bharatiya Janata Party	
Keonjhar	145	Telkoi (ST)	Niladri Nayak	Biju Janata Dal	
Keonjhar	146	Ramchandrapur	Badri Narayan Patra	Independent	
Keonjhar	147	Anandapur (SC)	Mayadhar Jena	Bharatiya Janata Party	

== Bypolls ==
Source
Year	Constituency	Reason for by-poll	Winning candidate	Party
September 2001	Rairakhol (SC)	Death of Durjodhan Sohela	Sanatan Bisi	Biju Janata Dal
May 2002	Bhadrak	Death of Biren Palei	Prafulla Samal	Biju Janata Dal
July 2002	Nayagarh	Death of Bhagabat Behera	Mandakini Behera	Biju Janata Dal
September 2003	Birmaharajpur	Death of Baishnaba Padhan	Sanjeeb Kumar Sahoo	Biju Janata Dal
