= Manoranjan Dyan Samantara =

Indian politician

Member of the Odisha Legislative Assembly
- Incumbent
- Assumed office 4 June 2024
- Preceded by: Usha Devi
- Constituency: Chikiti

Personal details
- Born: 3 June 1972 (age 53)
- Party: Bharatiya Janata Party
- Spouse: Meena Sahu
- Parent: Chintamani Dyan Samantra (father)
- Profession: Politician

Manoranjan Dyan Samantara is an Indian politician. He was elected to the Odisha Legislative Assembly from 2024, representing Chikiti as a member of the Bharatiya Janata Party.
