= Sachhidanand Narayan Deb =

Indian politician (1923–2019)

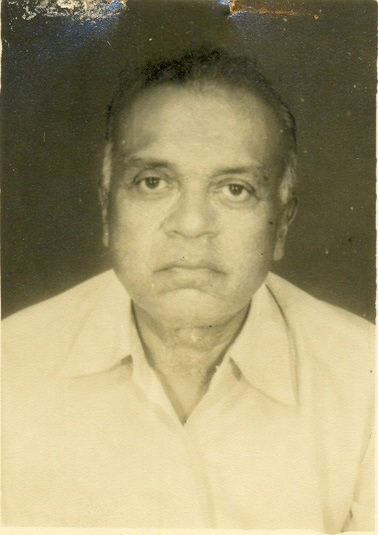

Odisha Legislative Assembly
- In office 1971–1977
- Preceded by: Dibakar Patanik
- Succeeded by: Jagannath Pati
- Constituency: Chikiti

Personal details
- Born: 15 October 1923
- Died: 27 December 2019 (aged 96)
- Party: Indian National Congress
- Relatives: Usha Devi (daughter-in-law)

Sachhidanand Narayan Deb (15 October 1923 – 27 December 2019) was an Indian politician from Odisha belonging to Indian National Congress. He was a legislator of the Odisha Legislative Assembly.

== Biography ==
Deb was elected as a legislator of the Odisha Legislative Assembly from Chikiti in 1971. He was also elected from this constituency in 1974. He is the father-in-law of Usha Devi who is the current legislator of this constituency.

Deb died on 27 December 2019 at the age of 96.
