= Tusharkanti Behera =

Indian politician

Member of the Odisha Legislative Assembly
- Incumbent
- Assumed office 2019
- Preceded by: Surendra Sethi
- Constituency: Kakatpur

Personal details
- Political party: Biju Janata Dal
- Profession: Politician

Tusharkanti Behera is an Indian politician from Odisha. He is a Member of the Odisha Legislative Assembly from 2024, representing Kakatpur Assembly constituency as a Member of the Biju Janata Dal.

== See also ==
- 2019 Odisha Legislative Assembly election
- Odisha Legislative Assembly
