= Nibedita Pradhan =

Indian politician (1963–2023)

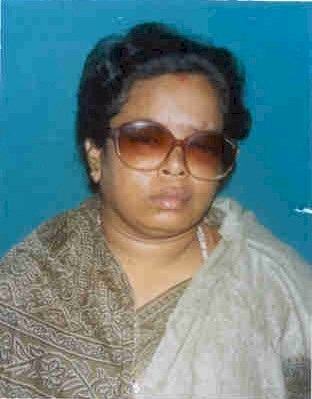
- Portrait of Nibedita Pradhan

Member of Odisha Legislative Assembly
- In office 2000–2004
- Preceded by: Bijay Lakshmi Sahoo
- Succeeded by: Pravat Ranjan Biswal
- Constituency: Cuttack Sadar

Mayor of Cuttack Municipal Corporation
- In office 2004–2009
- Preceded by: Post Established

Personal details
- Born: 19 May 1949
- Died: 10 August 2023 (aged 60) Cuttack, Odisha, India
- Party: Bharatiya Janata Party
- Profession: Politician

Nibedita Pradhan (7 July 1963 – 10 August 2023) was an Indian politician who served as Member of Odisha Legislative Assembly from Cuttack Sadar Assembly constituency. In 2004, she was elected as the first mayor of Cuttack Municipal Corporation and served the full term till 2009.

Pradhan was born on 7 July 1963, and died on 10 August 2023, at the age of 60.
