= Pramila Giri =

Indian politician

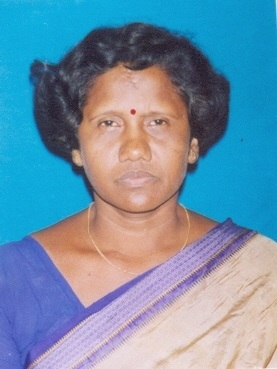

Member: Odisha Legislative Assembly
- In office May 2004 – May 2009
- Preceded by: Kandra Soren
- Constituency: Baisinga

Personal details
- Born: Pramila Giri; 1 January 1957 (age 69) Mayurbhanj, Odisha, India
- Party: Biju Janata Dal
- Other political affiliations: Bharatiya Janata Party
- Spouse(s): Rasika Chandra Giri (Former military man, has passed away)
- Children: Son (1)
- Education: B.A
- Profession: Politician

Pramila Giri is a Politician from Odisha. She was former Member of Legislative Assembly of Baisinga.

== Early life ==
Pramila Giri was born and currently residing in Baisinga, Mayurbhanj in a Hindu Gopal (Yadav) family.
