= Bijaya Kumar Dalabehera =

Indian politician

Member of Odisha Legislative Assembly
- Incumbent
- Assumed office 4 June 2024
- Preceded by: Debiprasad Mishra
- Constituency: Baramba

Personal details
- Party: Independent politician
- Profession: Politician

Bijaya Kumar Dalabehera is an Indian politician. He was elected to the Odisha Legislative Assembly from Baramba as an independent politician following ticket denial from the Bharatiya Janata Party.
