= Rama Chandra Panda =

Indian politician

Member: Odisha Legislative Assembly
- In office 2000–2004
- Preceded by: Daitari Behera
- Succeeded by: Nagireddy Narayan Reddy
- Constituency: Chhatrapur

Personal details
- Born: 15 June 1949 (age 77) Ganjam, Odisha, India
- Party: BJP

Rama Chandra Panda casually known as Rama Panda (born 15 June 1949) was a member of the 12th Odisha Legislative Assembly. He represented the Chhatrapur constituency of Odisha and is a member of the Bhartiya Janata Party (BJP) political party. He is a former Deputy Speaker of Odisha Legislative Assembly from 27 March 2000 to 6 February 2004.

== Political career ==
He joined Biju Janata Dal on 12 January 2017, under the leadership and in presence of Naveen Patnaik. He was The national vice-president of BJP Kisan Morcha of (2013–2015). He was the state executive member of BJP, Odisha Unit. Earlier he held these posts of chairman of two Odisha State Public Undertakings namely Odisha Lift Irrigation Corporation and Odisha Agro Industries Corporation.

He had quit from BJP, Odisha to join Uma Bharti's Bharatiya Janshakti Party on 30 April 2006. With Arabinda Dhali, a former transport and corporation minister and two-time MLA from Malkangiri district he had joined the above said party. Perhaps intervention by outside leaders in Ganjam District Organization was reason for his decision leaving the party. Later, almost after a year on 7 April 2007 he rejoined BJP, after getting absolute majority by his supports in Gram Panchayat elections in Ganjam Block.

== Social Activities ==
Earlier he also served as Part-time Law teacher in Berhampur University, Odisha. He also served as member of Zonal Railway Users Consultative Committee, SE Railway.

He attended the Commonwealth study program in the House of Commons, UK. He visited a number of countries namely Sri Lanka, UK, Singapore, Nepal, UAE, Saudi Arabia. He is also a trade union leader and has been fighting for the cause of labourers and industrial workers.

== Bibliography ==
- ସୁଭାଷ ବାଦ : ଏକ ଅନ୍ତରଂଗ ଅଧ୍ୟୟନ (Subhash Bad : An intimate study) – Published by him on Odisha on 23 January 2014 on the eve of Subash Chandra Bose's 118th birthday.
