= Murlidhar Chandrakant Bhandare =

Indian politician (1928–2024)

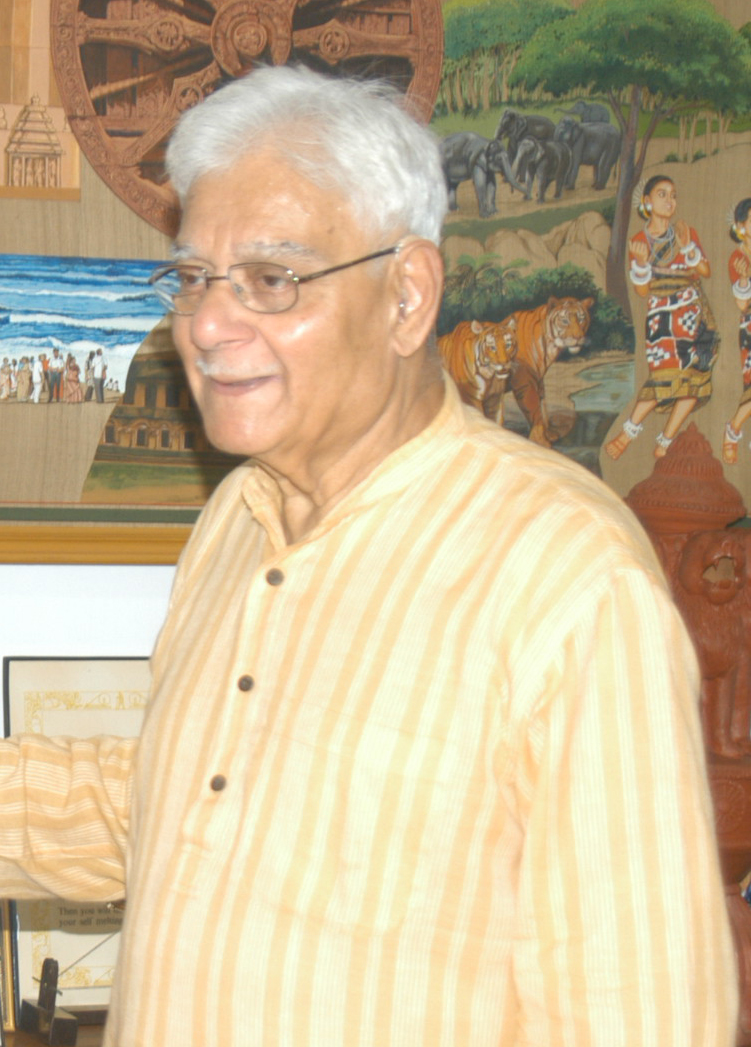

23rd Governor of Odisha
- In office 21 August 2007 – 9 March 2013
- Chief Minister: Naveen Patnaik
- Preceded by: Rameshwar Thakur
- Succeeded by: S. C. Jamir

Member of Parliament Rajya Sabha
- In office 1980–1994
- Constituency: Maharashtra

Personal details
- Born: 10 December 1928 Bombay, Bombay Presidency, British India
- Died: 15 June 2024 (aged 95)
- Profession: Advocate, politician, public administrator

Murlidhar Chandrakant Bhandare (10 December 1928 – 15 June 2024) was an Indian politician. He was a senior Indian National Congress leader from Maharashtra and a Rajya Sabha member for three terms during 1980–1982, 1982–1988 and 1988–1994. He practised as Senior Advocate of Supreme Court of India and was President of Supreme Court Bar Association for two terms. Appointed Governor of Odisha on 19 August 2007, he was sworn in on 21 August 2007. On 9 June 2008, he marked the 2nd National Daughters Day of India (Nandini Diwas). He continued in the office until the appointment of S. C. Jamir on 9 March 2013. His autobiography, titled The Arc of Memory: My Life and Times was released in March 2024, He died on 15 June 2024, at the age of 95.
