= Debi Prasad Mishra =

Indian politician

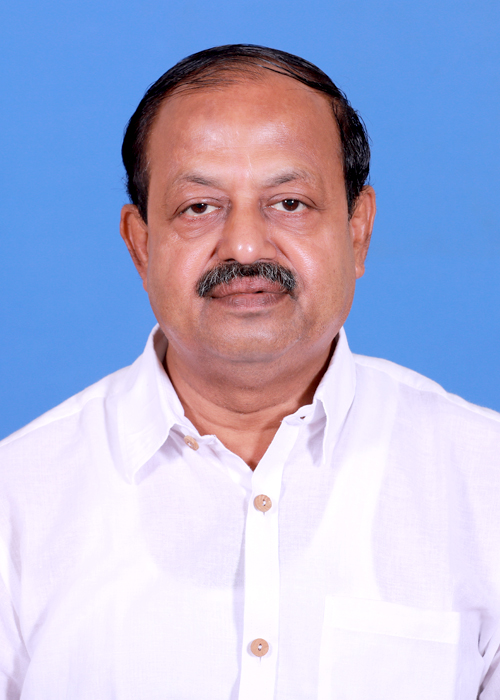

Member of Odisha Legislative Assembly
- In office 1995–2024
- Preceded by: Rajasaheb Trilochan Mansing Harichandan
- Succeeded by: Bijaya Kumar Dalabehera
- Constituency: Baramba

Personal details
- Party: Biju Janata Dal
- Profession: Politician

Debi Prasad Mishra is an Indian politician from Odisha. He was a six time elected Member of the Odisha Legislative Assembly from 1995, representing Baramba Assembly constituency as a Member of the Janata Dal and from 2000, 2004, 2009, 2014, and 2019 representing the same constituency as a member of Biju Janata Dal.

== See also ==
- 1995 Odisha Legislative Assembly election
- Odisha Legislative Assembly
