= Rameshwar Thakur =

Indian politician (1925–2015)

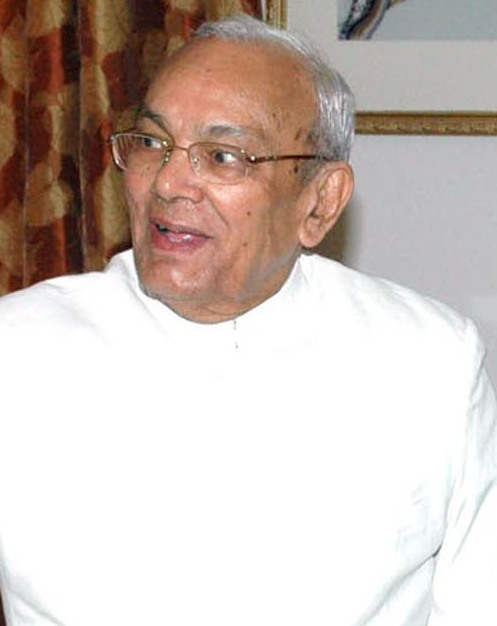

15th Governor of Madhya Pradesh
- In office 30 June 2009 – 7 September 2011
- Chief Minister: Shivraj Singh Chauhan
- Preceded by: Balram Jakhar
- Succeeded by: Ram Naresh Yadav

10th Governor of Karnataka
- In office 21 August 2007 – 24 June 2009
- Chief Minister: H. D. Kumaraswamy; B. S. Yediyurappa
- Preceded by: T. N. Chaturvedi
- Succeeded by: Hansraj Bhardwaj

Governor of Andhra Pradesh
- (Additional Charge)
- In office 29 January 2006 – 22 August 2007
- Chief Minister: Y. S. Rajasekhara Reddy
- Preceded by: Sushil Kumar Shinde
- Succeeded by: Narayan Dutt Tiwari

22nd Governor of Odisha
- In office 18 November 2004 – 21 August 2007
- Chief Minister: Naveen Patnaik
- Preceded by: M. M. Rajendran
- Succeeded by: Murlidhar Chandrakant Bhandare

Union Minister of India

President of the Bharat Scouts and Guides
- In office 1998–2001

President of the ICAI
- In office 1966–1967
- Preceded by: CA. M.P. Chitale
- Succeeded by: CA. V.B. Haribhakti

Personal details
- Born: 28 July 1925 Thakurgangti, Bihar-Orissa, British India (now in Jharkhand, India)
- Died: 15 January 2015 (aged 89) Delhi, India
- Party: Indian National Congress
- Spouse: Narmada Thakur
- Children: 4

Rameshwar Thakur (28 July 1925 – 15 January 2015) was a politician and former union minister of India, he also served as the Governor of Madhya Pradesh from 2009 to 2011, Governor of Odisha from 2004 to 2006, Governor of Andhra Pradesh from 2006 to 2007 and Governor of Karnataka from 2007 to 2009. He was a Chartered Accountant. He was also President of the Institute of Chartered Accountants of India from 1966 to 1967.

== Biography ==
Thakur was born in the village of Thakur Gangti, Godda District, Jharkhand. He had participated in Quit India movement. He served as President of the Bharat Scouts and Guides from November 1998 to November 2001, and again after November 2004. Thakur was sworn in as the 15th Governor of Karnataka on 21 August 2007.

He was married to Narmada Thakur and they had two sons and two daughters: Mridula, Sangeeta, Sushil and Anil Thakur.

He was transferred to Governor Madhya Pradesh for the remainder of his gubernatorial term on 24 June 2009. Thakur took over from Balram Jakhar on the end of the latter's term on 30 June. He left office on 7 September 2011.

Thakur inaugurating OCIT 2006 with Saraju Mohanty as the Program Chair.

He was the governor of Odisha during the year 2004 to 2007. He was promoter of Information Technology (IT). He was supportive of one of the earliest conferences on IT called OITS International Conference on Information Technology (OCIT), which was formerly known as ICIT or CIT. OCIT 2023 was held at NIT Raipur during December 2023.

Rameswar died on 15 January 2015 at Delhi.

== See also ==
- V Rajaraman

Preceded by Shankarrao Chavan	Presidents of the Bharat Scouts and Guides; 1998–2001	Succeeded by Sharad Pawar
Preceded by Sharad Pawar	Presidents of the Bharat Scouts and Guides; 2004–2013	Succeeded by Ashok Gehlot
Government offices
Preceded by Sushil Kumar Shinde	Governor of Andhra Pradesh; 2006-2007	Succeeded by Narayan Dutt Tiwari
Preceded by M. M. Rajendran	Governor of Odisha; 2004-2007	Succeeded by Murlidhar Chandrakant Bhandare
Preceded by T. N. Chaturvedi	Governor of Karnataka; 2007-2009	Succeeded by Hansraj Bhardwaj
