= Baramba Assembly constituency =

Constituency of the Odisha legislative assembly in India

Coordinates: 20.42°N 85.34°E

Baramba
- Constituency No. 87 for the Odisha Legislative Assembly

Constituency details
- Country: India
- Region: East India
- State: Odisha
- Division: Central Division
- District: Cuttack
- Lok Sabha constituency: Cuttack
- Established: 1952
- Total electors: 2,47,960 (Note: as on 2024) (Note: as data published by election commission)
- Reservation: None

Member of Legislative Assembly
- 17th Odisha Legislative Assembly
- Incumbent Bijaya Kumar Dalabehera
- Party: Independent
- Elected year: 2024

Baramba is a Vidhan Sabha constituency of Cuttack district, Odisha.

This constituency includes Baramba block and Narasinghpur block.

== Elected members ==
Vote share of winning candidates
2024	46.51%
2019	52.08%
2014	58.27%
2009	54.79%
2004	62.63%
2000	81.65%
1995	32.79%
1990	80.88%
1985	55.87%
1980	50.15%
1977	30.04%

Since its formation in 1952, 17 elections were held till date.

List of members elected from Baramba constituency are:

Year	Member	Party
As Narasinghpur constituency
1952	Brundaban Sahu	All India Ganatantra Parishad
As Baramba constituency
1957	Rani Saheba Kanaklata Debi	Ganatantra Parishad
1961	Bidyadhar Naik	Indian National Congress
1967	Pratap Chandra Pattanaik	Orissa Jana Congress
1971	Rajasaheb Trilochan Mansing Harichandan	Swatantra Party
1974	Rajasaheb Trilochan Mansing Harichandan	Swatantra Party
1977	Rajasaheb Trilochan Mansing Harichandan	Independent politician
1980	Samir Kumar Routray	Indian National Congress (I)
1985	Lalit Mohan Mohanty	Indian National Congress
1990	Rajasaheb Trilochan Mansing Harichandan	Janata Dal
1995	Debiprasad Mishra	Janata Dal
2000	Debiprasad Mishra	Biju Janata Dal
2004	Debiprasad Mishra	Biju Janata Dal
2009	Debiprasad Mishra	Biju Janata Dal
2014	Debiprasad Mishra	Biju Janata Dal
2019	Debiprasad Mishra	Biju Janata Dal
2024	Bijaya Kumar Dalabehera	Independent politician

== Election results ==
=== 2024 ===
Voting was held on 25 May 2024 in the 3rd phase of the Odisha Assembly Election & 6th phase of the Indian General Election. The counting of votes was on 4 June 2024. In 2024 election, Independent candidate Bijaya Kumar Dalabehera defeated Biju Janata Dal candidate Debiprasad Mishra by a margin of 23,479 votes.

2024 Odisha Vidhan Sabha Election, Baramba
Party	Candidate	Votes	%	±%
Independent	Bijaya Kumar Dalabehera	86,018	46.51	▲46.51
BJD	Debiprasad Mishra	62,539	33.81	▼18.27
BJP	Sambit Tripathy	30,755	16.63	▼25.09
INC	Sanjaya Kumar Sahoo	2,153	1.16	▼2.42
NOTA	None of the above	966	0.52	▼0.12
Majority		23,479	12.70	▲2.34
Turnout		1,84,945	74.59	
Independent gain from BJD				

=== 2019 ===
In 2019 election, Biju Janata Dal candidate Debiprasad Mishra defeated Bharatiya Janata Party candidate Bijaya Kumar Dalabehera by a margin of 18,019 votes.

2019 Vidhan Sabha Election, Baramba
Party	Candidate	Votes	%	±%
BJD	Debiprasad Mishra	90,564	52.08	
BJP	Bijaya Kumar Dalabehera	72.545	41.72	
INC	Bobby Mohanty	6,224	3.58	
NOTA	None of the above	1,115	0.64	
Majority		18,019	10.36	
Turnout		1,73,887	73.74	
BJD hold				

=== 2014 ===
In 2014 election, Biju Janata Dal candidate Debiprasad Mishra defeated Indian National Congress candidate Laxmi Devi by a margin of 68,011 votes.

2014 Vidhan Sabha Election, Baramba
Party	Candidate	Votes	%	±%
BJD	Debiprasad Mishra	91,772	58.27	
INC	Laxmi Devi	23,761	15.09	
Independent	Surya Kishore Mohanty	17,200	10.92	
BJP	Bibhudatta Pattanaik	14,226	9.03	
NOTA	None of the above	1,921	1.22	
Majority		68,011	43.18	
Turnout		1,57,501	73.49	
Registered electors		2,15,056		
BJD hold				

=== 2009 ===
In 2009 election, Biju Janata Dal candidate Debiprasad Mishra defeated Indian National Congress candidate Surendra Kumar Nanda by a margin of 38,189 votes.

2009 Vidhan Sabha Election, Baramba
Party	Candidate	Votes	%	±%
BJD	Debiprasad Mishra	79,658	59.86	−
INC	Surendra Kumar Nanda	41,469	31.16	−
BJP	Saroj Kumar Rana	5,931	4.46	−
Majority		38,189	28.70 (Note: %of total valid votes)	−
Turnout		1,33,100	65.33	−
Registered electors		2,03,728		
BJD hold		Swing	▼0.46 (Note: 2004 Voter turnout was 65.79%)	
