= Nagendra Kumar Pradhan =

Indian politician

Member of Parliament for Sambalpur
- In office 2014–2019
- Preceded by: Amarnath Pradhan
- Constituency: Sambalpur

Member: Legislative Assembly of Odisha
- In office 2000–2009
- Preceded by: Amarnath Pradhan
- Succeeded by: Sanjeeb Kumar Sahoo
- Constituency: Athmallik
- In office 1990–1995
- Preceded by: Amarnath Pradhan
- Succeeded by: Amarnath Pradhan
- Constituency: Athmallik

Personal details
- Born: 29 September 1967 (age 58) Buhalipal, Hindol, Dhenkanal
- Party: Indian National Congress
- Other political affiliations: Janata Dal, Biju Janata Dal
- Spouse: Sobhamayee Dehury
- Profession: Politician

Nagendra Kumar Pradhan is an Indian politician. He was elected to the 16th Lok Sabha in 2014 from Sambalpur constituency in Odisha. He was a member of the Biju Janata Dal (BJD) but joined the Indian National Congress (INC) in 2024 after stating that the BJD and BJP were involved in a "friendly fight" to deprive the people. He is a former member of Legislative Assembly of Odisha.

== Election results ==
=== 2014 ===
2014 General Election, Sambalpur
Party	Candidate	Votes	%	±%
BJD	Nagendra Kumar Pradhan	3,58,618	36.43	
BJP	Suresh Pujari	3,28,042	33.33	
INC	Amarnath Pradhan	2,42,131	24.6	
BSP	Nathu ram	12,211	1.24	
AAP	Anand Kumar Samal	7,029	0.71	
Independent	Md. Ali Hussain	4,763	0.48	
SUCI(C)	Prasadi Pradhan	4,502	0.46	
Independent	Ashok Panda	4,018	0.41	
Independent	Dusmanta Kar	4,012	0.41	
Proutist Bloc, India	Sankar Lal Agrawal	3,110	0.32	
Paschimanchal Vikas Party	Tarani Bhoi	2,559	0.26	
NOTA	None	13,314	1.35	−
Majority		30,576	3.10	−
Turnout		9,84,309	76.62	
Registered electors		12,83,061		
BJD gain from INC				

== Committee Memberships ==
- Committee on Public Undertakings (COPU) - Member 2018

== See also ==
- Indian general election, 2014 (Odisha)
