= Surendra Nath Naik =

Former Odisha minister

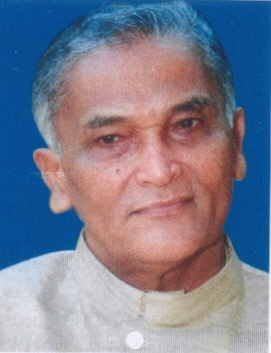

Member of the Odisha Legislative Assembly
- In office 1971–2009
- Constituency: Kakatpur

Minister for Revenue and Excise
- In office 1990–1995

Minister for School and Mass Education
- In office 2002–2004

Minister for Agriculture
- In office 2004–2009

Deputy Chairman, Odisha Planning Board
- In office 2012–2014

Deputy Speaker of the Odisha Legislative Assembly
- In office 27 July 1977 – 17 February 1980

Personal details
- Born: 17 May 1937
- Died: 5 July 2024 (aged 87) Bhubaneswar, India
- Party: Biju Janata Dal, Janata Party, Janata Dal, Utkal Congress
- Spouse: Charubala Devi
- Profession: Politician

Surendra Nath Naik (17 May 1937 – 5 July 2024) was an Indian politician, a senior leader of the Biju Janata Dal (BJD), and a former minister in Odisha. He served seven terms as a Member of the Odisha Legislative Assembly. Naik was a cabinet minister in the BJD-BJP coalition government led by Chief Minister Naveen Patnaik from 2000 to 2009, overseeing various portfolios including excise, revenue, school and mass education, and Panchayati Raj. Naik also served as the deputy chairman of the Odisha Planning Board from 2012 to 2014.

== Early life and education ==
Surendra Nath Naik was born on 17 May 1937, to Narayan Naik and married Charubala Devi. He was inspired to enter politics by Chief Minister Biju Patnaik. Naik's political journey began early, as he was active in politics since his student days. In 1968, he was arrested for protesting a bus fare increase and was again detained in 1975 under the Maintenance of Internal Security Act (MISA).

== Political career ==
Naik started his political career as Chairperson of the Astaranga Panchayat Samiti during 1960–1967. He was first elected to the Odisha Legislative Assembly in 1971 from the Kakatpur constituency on an Utkal Congress ticket. He was re-elected six more times from the same constituency in 1977, 1985, 1990, 1995 (by-election), 2000, 2004, and 2009. Naik represented the 5th, 7th, 9th, 10th, 11th (by-election), 12th, and 13th Odisha Legislative Assembly sessions, respectively.

During his career, Naik served in several key roles. He was the Minister for Revenue and Excise in 1990 under Chief Minister Biju Patnaik. From 2002 to 2004, he held the position of Minister for School and Mass Education, and in 2004, he became the Minister for Agriculture. He was also appointed as deputy chairman, Odisha Planning Commission during the tenure of Naveen Patnaik government.

He served as Deputy Speaker of the Odisha Legislative Assembly from 27 July 1977, to 17 February 1980. He was also imprisoned during the Emergency period due to his political activities.

== Political affiliation ==
Naik was associated with several political parties, including the Biju Janata Dal, Janata Party, Janata Dal, and Utkal Congress. He was often referred to as the Bhishma Pitamah of Odisha politics.

== Health and passing ==
Naik died on 5 July 2024, at his residence in Bhubaneswar at the age of 93. He had been suffering from a brain stroke since 2019. A guard of honour was held for him at the Odisha Legislative Assembly, where Speaker Surama Padhy, Chief Minister Mohan Charan Majhi, deputy chief ministers Kanak Vardhan Singh Deo and Pravati Parida, along with several ministers and MLAs, paid their tributes. His body was also taken to Sankha Bhawan, the BJD headquarters, where Leader of Opposition Naveen Patnaik, party leaders, and MLAs paid their final respects.
