= Kakatpur Assembly constituency =

Constituency of the Odisha legislative assembly in India

Coordinates: 20.00°N 86.20°E

Kakatpur
- Constituency No. 105 for the Odisha Legislative Assembly
- Kakatpur Assembly constituency in Puri district

Constituency details
- Country: India
- Region: East India
- State: Odisha
- Division: Central Division
- District: Puri
- Lok Sabha constituency: Jagatsinghpur
- Established: 1952
- Total electors: 2,44,399 (Note: as on 2024) (Note: as data published by election commission)
- Reservation: SC

Member of Legislative Assembly
- 17th Odisha Legislative Assembly
- Incumbent Tusharkanti Behera
- Party: Biju Janata Dal
- Elected year: 2024

Kakatpur is a Vidhan Sabha constituency of Puri district, Odisha.

This constituency includes Konark, Kakatpur block, Astarang block and 13 Gram panchayats (Jangalbori, Birtung, Baulanga, Desthali, Dhumala, Sorava, Mahalapada, Achutapur, Banakhandi, Simmili, Sutan, Tarakora and Badagaon) of Gop block.

== Elected members ==
Vote share of winning candidates
2024	47.05%
2019	53.68%
2014	57.42%
2009	52.57%
2004	46.31%
2000	55.89%
1996 (bypoll)	48.87%
1995	47.76%
1990	56.21%
1985	49.64%
1980	47.09%
1977	62.56%

Since its formation in 1951, 18 elections were held till date including one bypoll in 1995. It was a 2-member constituency for 1952 & 1957.

List of members elected Kakatpur constituency are:

Year	Member	Party
2024	Tusharkanti Behera	Biju Janata Dal
2019	Tusharkanti Behera	Biju Janata Dal
2014	Surendra Sethi	Biju Janata Dal
2009	Rabi Mallick	Biju Janata Dal
2004	Surendra Nath Naik	Biju Janata Dal
2000	Surendra Nath Naik	Biju Janata Dal
1996 (bypoll) (Note: Death of Baikunthanath Swain)	Surendra Nath Naik	Janata Dal
1995	Baikunthanath Swain	Indian National Congress
1990	Surendra Nath Naik	Janata Dal
1985	Surendra Nath Naik	Janata Party
1980	Baikunthanath Swain	Indian National Congress (I)
1977	Surendra Nath Naik	Janata Party
1974	Brundaban Patra	Indian National Congress
1971	Surendra Nath Naik	Utkal Congress
1967	Gatikrushna Swain	Communist Party of India
1961	Upendra Mohanty	Orissa Jana Congress
1957 (Note: It was a 2 member constituency)	Bharat Das	Communist Party of India
1957	Mohan Das	Communist Party of India
As Kakatpur-Nimapara Constituency
1951 (Note: It was a 2 member constituency)	Gobinda Chandra Sethi	Indian National Congress
1951	Upendra Mohanty	Indian National Congress

== Election results ==
=== 2024 ===
Voting were held on 1 June 2024 in 4th phase of Odisha Assembly Election & 7th phase of Indian General Election. Counting of votes was on 4 June 2024. In 2024 election, Biju Janata Dal candidate Tusharkanti Behera defeated Bharatiya Janata Party candidate Baidhar Malik by a margin of 45,691 votes.

2024 Odisha Vidhan Sabha Election, Kakatpur
Party	Candidate	Votes	%	±%
BJD	Tusharkanti Behera	84,010	47.05	▼6.63
BJP	Baidhar Mallick	60,859	34.08	▲16.10
INC	Bishwa Bhushan Das	31,325	17.54	▼9.45
NOTA	None of the above	382	0.21	▼0.22
Majority		23,151	12.97	
Turnout		1,78,561	73.06	
BJD hold				

=== 2019 ===
In 2019 election, Biju Janata Dal candidate Tusharkanti Behera defeated Indian National Congress candidate Biswa Bhusan Das by a margin of 45,691 votes.

2019 Odisha Vidhan Sabha Election, Kakatpur
Party	Candidate	Votes	%	±%
BJD	Tusharkanti Behera	91,897	53.68	▼3.74
INC	Biswa Bhusan Das	46,206	26.99	▼4.24
BJP	Rabi Mallick	30,771	17.98	▲10.26
NOTA	None of the above	736	0.43	
Majority		45,691	26.69	
Turnout		1,70,889	70.6	
BJD hold				

=== 2014 ===
In 2014 election, Biju Janata Dal candidate Surendra Sethi defeated Indian National Congress candidate Rabindra Kumar Sethy by a margin of 41,030 votes.

2014 Odisha Vidhan Sabha Election, Kakatpur
Party	Candidate	Votes	%	±%
BJD	Surendra Sethi	89,963	57.42	▲4.85
INC	Rabindra Kumar Sethy	48,933	31.23	▲3.67
BJP	Tusharkanti Behera	12,093	7.72	▲4.69
NOTA	None of the above	838	0.53	−
Majority		41,030	26.19	−
Turnout		1,56,671	71.05	▲5.41
Registered electors		2,20,522		
BJD hold				

=== 2009 ===
In 2009 election, Biju Janata Dal candidate Rabi Mallick defeated Indian National Congress candidate Biswa Bhusan Das by a margin of 15,221 votes.

2009 Odisha Vidhan Sabha Election, Kakatpur
Party	Candidate	Votes	%	±%
BJD	Rabi Mallick	74,114	52.57	▲6.26
INC	Biswa Bhusan Das	58,893	27.56	−
BJP	Iswar Chandra Behera	4,273	3.03	−
Majority		15,221	10.80 (Note: %of total valid votes)	−
Turnout		1,41,062	65.64	▼5.74
BJD hold				
