= Sanatan Bisi =

Indian politician (1941–2020)

Member of Parliament, Rajya Sabha
- In office 1994-2000
- Constituency: Odisha

Personal details
- Born: 16 November 1941
- Died: 14 April 2020 (aged 78)
- Party: Janata Dal
- Other political affiliations: Biju Janata Dal
- Spouse: Jagyasini Bisi

Sanatan Bisi was an Indian politician. He was a Member of Parliament, representing Odisha in the Rajya Sabha the upper house of India's Parliament as a member of the Janata Dal.
