= Usha Devi =

Indian politician

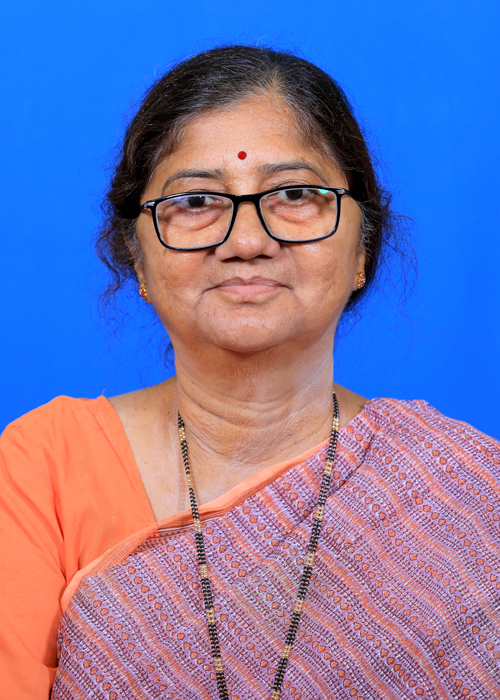

Member of the Legislative Assembly for Chikiti
- Incumbent
- Assumed office 23 May 2019
- Preceded by: Chintamani dyan samantara
- Constituency: Chikiti constituency

Personal details
- Born: 25 February 1952 (age 74) India
- Party: Biju Janata Dal
- Relatives: Sachhidanand Narayan Deb (father-in-law)
- Occupation: Politician
- Profession: social work

Usha Devi (born 25 May 1952) is an Indian politician. She is a Biju Janata Dal MLA from the constituency of Chikiti (Odisha Vidhan Sabha constituency) in Odisha.
