= Bishnu Charan Das =

Indian politician (1954–2020)

Member of Rajya Sabha for Odisha
- In office 2 July 2016 – 21 March 2017
- Preceded by: Baishnab Charan Parida, BJD
- Succeeded by: Pratap Keshari Deb
- Constituency: Odisha

Personal details
- Born: 9 October 1954
- Died: 6 July 2020 (aged 65)
- Political party: BJD

Bishnu Charan Das (9 October 1954 – 6 July 2020) was an Indian politician from the state of Odisha. He was a leader of the Biju Janata Dal and had previously contested seats in Odisha Legislative Assembly from Jagatsinghpur seat.

In 2016, he was the candidate of the party for the biennial Rajya Sabha elections. He was elected unopposed with Prasanna Acharya and N. Bhaskar Rao.

He resigned from Rajya Sabha on 21 March 2017 after being appointed deputy chairman of Odisha State Planning Board.

He died at a hospital in Bhubaneswar on 6 July 2020, weeks after he suffered a stroke.
