= Chikiti Assembly constituency =

Constituency of the Odisha legislative assembly in India

Coordinates: 19.20°N 84.61°E

Chikiti
- Constituency No. 135 for the Odisha Legislative Assembly
- Chikiti assembly constituency in Ganjam district

Constituency details
- Country: India
- Region: East India
- State: Odisha
- Division: Southern Division
- District: Ganjam
- Lok Sabha constituency: Berhampur
- Established: 1952
- Total electors: 2,16,271 (Note: as on 2024) (Note: as data published by election commission)
- Reservation: None

Member of Legislative Assembly
- 17th Odisha Legislative Assembly
- Incumbent Manoranjan Dyan Samantara
- Party: Bharatiya Janata Party
- Elected year: 2024

Chikiti is a Vidhan Sabha constituency of Ganjam district, Odisha.

This constituency includes Chikiti N.A.C., Chikiti Block and Patrapur Block.

== Elected members ==
Vote share of winning candidates
2024	49.67%
2019	54.80%
2014	58.76%
2009	52.79%
2004	49.85%
2000	55.63%
1995	46.03%
1990	59.93%
1985	61.74%
1980	35.91%
1977	52.14%

Since its formation in 1952, 16 elections were held till date. From 1952 to 1966, it was known as Patrapur constituency. The constituency was abolished in 1957 & revived in 1960 and reserved for SC. In 1967, the constituency name was changed to Chikiti and was made unreserved.

List of members elected from Chikiti constituency are:

Year	Member	Party
As Patrapur constituency
1952	Dibakar Patnaik	All India Forward Bloc
1957-1960 : Constituency did not exist
1961	Trilochan Jani	Indian National Congress
As Chikiti constituency
1967	Dibakar Patnaik	Indian National Congress
1971	Satchidananda Deo	Indian National Congress (R)
1974	Satchidananda Deo	Indian National Congress
1977	Jagannath Pati	Janata Party
1980	Chintamani Dyan Samantra	Independent politician
1985	Chintamani Dyan Samantra	Indian National Congress
1990	Usha Devi	Janata Dal
1995	Chintamani Dyan Samantra	Independent politician
2000	Usha Devi	Biju Janata Dal
2004	Usha Devi	Biju Janata Dal
2009	Usha Devi	Biju Janata Dal
2014	Usha Devi	Biju Janata Dal
2019	Usha Devi	Biju Janata Dal
2024	Manoranjan Dyan Samantara	Bharatiya Janata Party

== Election results ==
=== 2024 ===
Voting were held on 13 May 2024 in 1st phase of Odisha Assembly Election & 4th phase of Indian General Election. Counting of votes was on 4 June 2024. In 2024 election, Bharatiya Janata Party candidate Manoranjan Dyan Samantara defeated Biju Janata Dal candidate Chinmayananda Srirup Deb by a margin of 6,522 votes.

2024 Vidhan Sabha Election, Chikiti
Party	Candidate	Votes	%	±%
BJP	Manoranjan Dyan Samantara	69,839	49.67	▲10.28
BJD	Chinmayananda Srirup Deb	63,317	45.03	▼9.77
INC	Rabindra Nath Dyan Samantara	2,846	2.02	▼0.78
NOTA	None of the above	1,477	1.05	▲0.04
Majority		6,522	4.64	▼10.77
Turnout		1,40,619	65.02	▲1.03
BJP gain from BJD				

=== 2019 ===
In 2019 election, Biju Janata Dal candidate Usha Devi defeated Bharatiya Janata Party candidate Manoranjan Dyan Samantara by a margin of 20,635 votes.

2019 Vidhan Sabha Election, Chikiti
Party	Candidate	Votes	%	±%
BJD	Usha Devi	73,353	54.80	
BJP	Manoranjan Dyan Samantara	52,718	39.39	
INC	Subas Raut	3,747	2.80	
NOTA	None of the above	1,355	1.01	
Majority		20,635	15.41	
Turnout		1,33,846	63.99	
BJD hold				

=== 2014 ===
In 2014 election, Biju Janata Dal candidate Usha Devi defeated Indian National Congress candidate Manoranjan Dyan Samantara by a margin of 32,148 votes.

2014 Vidhan Sabha Election, Chikiti
Party	Candidate	Votes	%	±%
BJD	Usha Devi	74,849	58.76	▲5.97
INC	Manoranjan Dyan Samantara	42,701	33.52	▼5.64
SKD	Amulya Kumar Sahu	1,058	0.83	−
BJP	Udaya Nath Pradhan	4,590	3.6	▲0.17
NOTA	None of the above	1,203	0.94	−
Majority		32,148	25.24	▲11.61
Turnout		1,27,373	68.24	▲7.56
Registered electors		1,86,643		
BJD hold				

=== 2009 ===
In 2009 election, Biju Janata Dal candidate Usha Devi defeated Indian National Congress candidate Chintamani Dyan Samantara by a margin of 14,229 votes.

2009 Vidhan Sabha Election, Chikiti
Party	Candidate	Votes	%	±%
BJD	Usha Devi	55,099	52.79	−
INC	Chintamani Dyan Samantara	40,870	39.16	−
BJP	Kanhu Charan Pati	3,580	3.43	−
Majority		14,229	13.63 (Note: %of total valid votes)	−
Turnout		1,04,367	60.68 (Note: 2004 Voter turnout was 65.49%)	▼4.81
BJD hold				
