= M. M. Rajendran =

Indian politician (1935–2023)

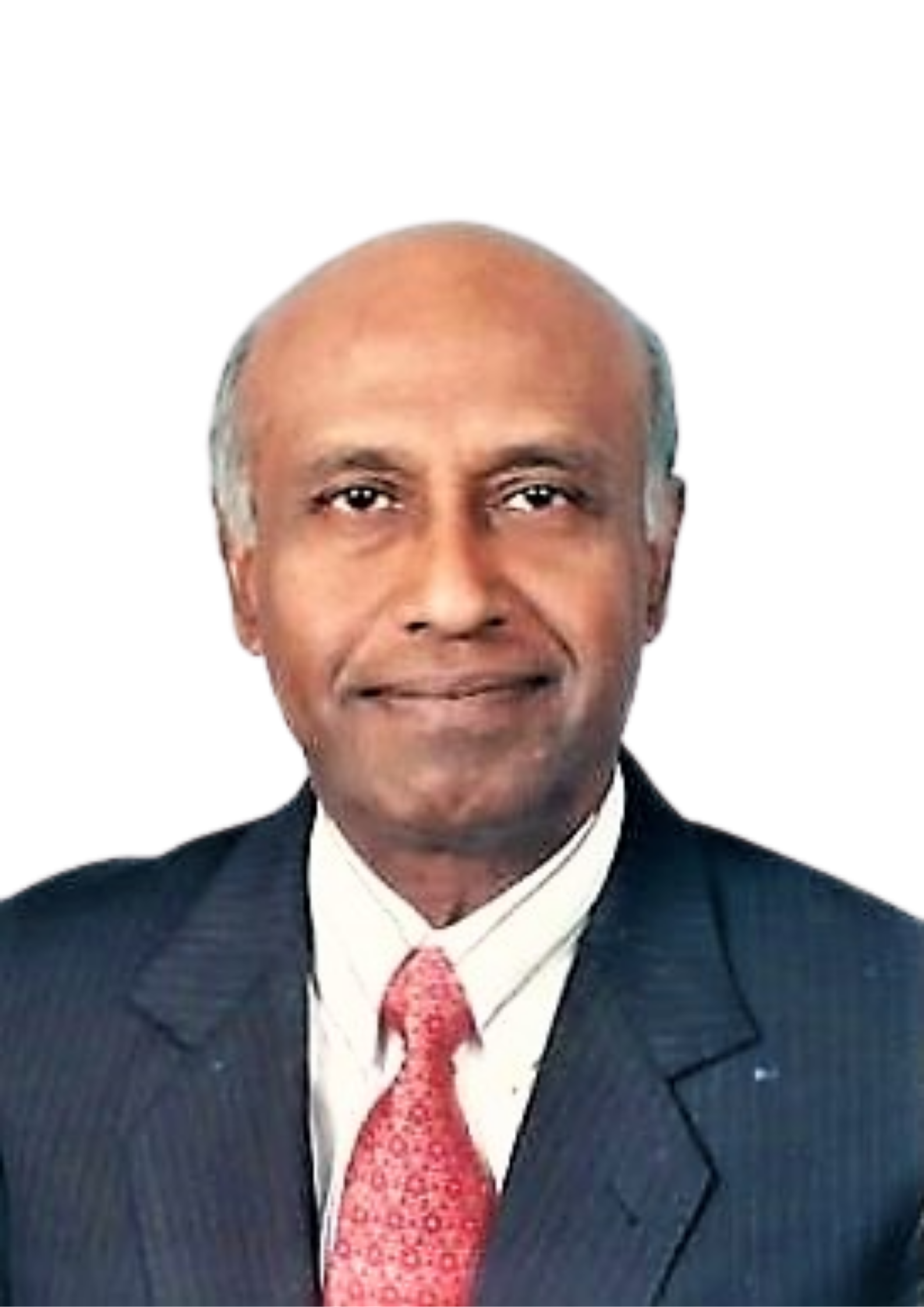

Governor of Odisha
- In office 15 November 1999 – 3 March 2003
- Chief Minister: Giridhar Gamang; Hemananda Biswal; Naveen Patnaik
- Preceded by: C. Rangarajan
- In office 15 November 2003 – 17 November 2004
- Preceded by: Surjit Singh Barnala
- Succeeded by: Rameshwar Thakur

Personal details
- Born: 12 April 1935 Madras Province, British India
- Died: 23 December 2023 (aged 88) Chennai, Tamil Nadu, India
- Education: Madras Christian College
- Profession: Civil servant, public administrator

Moberly Manoah Rajendran (12 April 1935 – 23 December 2023) was an Indian IAS officer who became Chief Secretary of Tamil Nadu and Governor of Odisha. Earlier he was a member of UNICEF's executive board and vice chairman of its program committee at New York. He was sponsored by a Tamil Nadu-based political party for the post of President of India in 2012.

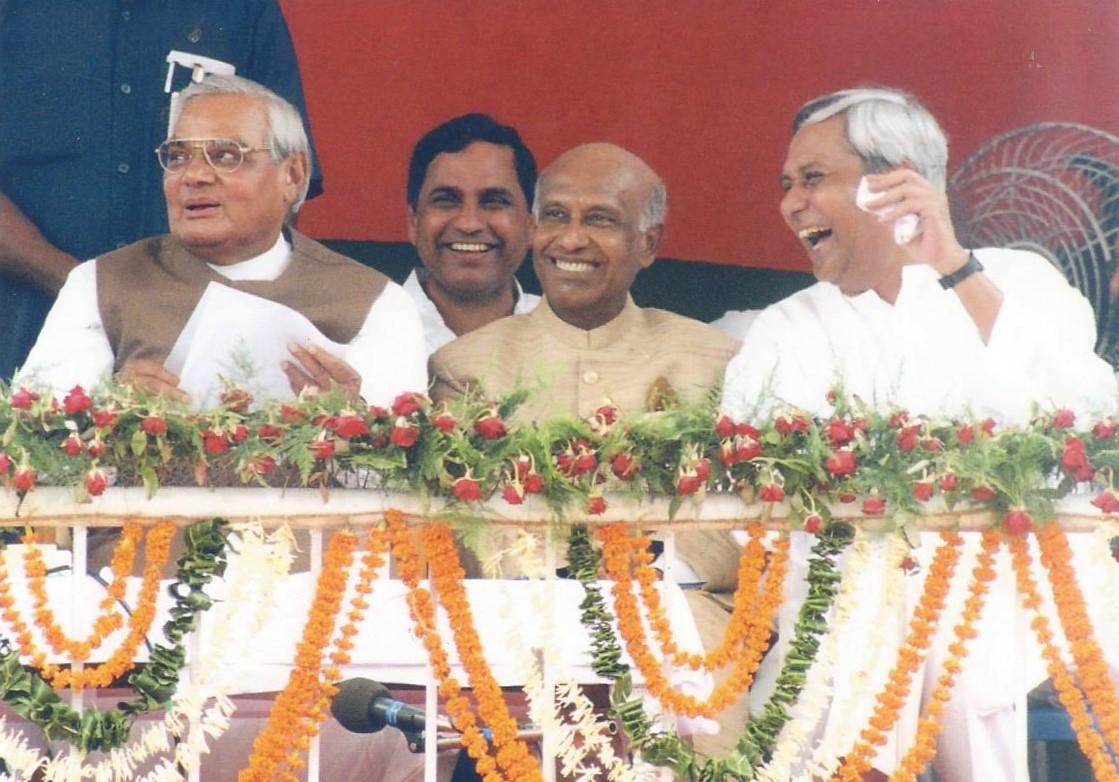
M. M. Rajendran at an event with the then Prime Minister of India, Atal Bihari Vajpayee

Rajendran took over as Governor of Odisha in 1999 soon after the State was hit by a super cyclone of unprecedented severity and was given the mandate by the prime minister to guide the State Government in its relief and rehabilitation work which earned the praise of the people of Odisha and the prime minister, who recognising his leadership, dissolved the Central Cabinet Committee earlier set up by him to coordinate the relief work. Realising that most of the 10,000 lives lost in the coastal areas could have been saved if only there were good shelters along the coast, he was instrumental in getting shelters built all along the coast, with the help of organizations such as German Red Cross, Ramakrishna Mission, Syrian church and many more and emergency procedures with community participation in Disaster Relief put in place when he was Governor of Odisha. These measures, followed by the State even after his departure, were of immense benefit to the people of Odisha in subsequent natural calamities, exemplified by the thousands of lives saved when Cyclone Fani in 2019 and more recently Yaas in May 2021, hit Odisha.

Recipient of several Lifetime Achievement Awards including the Mahatma Gandhi Award for Lifetime Achievement in 2019 from the Gandhi World Foundation celebrating 150 years of the Mahatma. He was also conferred the Honorary Lifetime Membership of the Rotary International in 2001. Rajendran died on 23 December 2023, at the age of 88.

== Early life ==
Rajendran was born on 12 April 1935 into a Protestant Tamil Christian family. His father, Dr. Arumainayagam Moberly, worked for the Government of Madras Presidency as a veterinary surgeon while his mother, Rajammal Moberly, was a trained teacher. Dr. Moberly's job entailed frequent transfers across the Madras presidency. Having been brought up primarily in rural areas, Rajendran's formative years shaped his flair for rural development, a niche in which he would hone his skills later in his career. His consistently excellent academic performance was initiated under the tutelage of his mother who resigned from her job at a school in Madurai following her marriage.

== Education ==
=== Elementary and secondary education ===
Equipped to begin his elementary education after being trained by his mother, Rajendran was admitted to the first standard in a locally run school at Paramakudi in Tamil Nadu, at the age of four. On realizing that Rajendran's teacher, who ignored him in class, was partial to a group of students who were privately tutored by her, Mrs. Moberly decided to homeschool her son owing to the absence of any other schools in their village. Three years under the guidance of his mother made Rajendran qualified enough to be admitted to the fifth standard at the age of seven in Devakottai, a larger town to which Dr. Moberly was transferred. In the years that followed, Rajendran changed schools multiple times as his family moved from one town or village to another as a result of his father's job.

Rajendran completed his SSLC Public Examination from a municipality-run school in Mayavaram (presently known as Mayiladuthurai) by becoming the top scorer of the institution. A new mandate by the government specifying the minimum age limit to enroll in a college prevented Rajendran from joining college, as he was younger than the announced age limit by a few months. In the year that he had to wait to become eligible for college admission, he worked on taking courses in shorthand, typewriting and Hindi, in addition to expanding his knowledge repository by utilizing the local library in Nagapattinam which was his family's new home.

=== College education ===
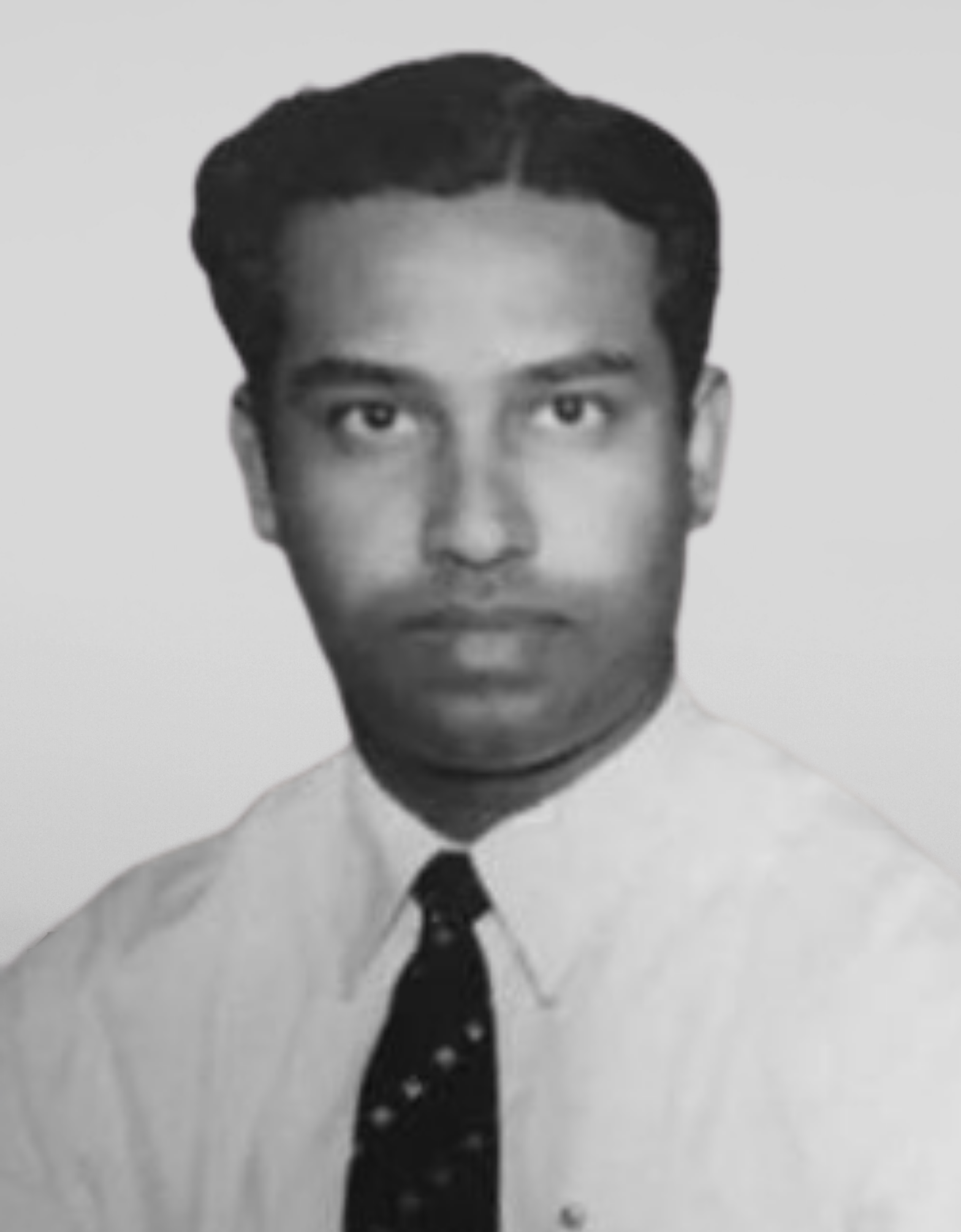
M. M. Rajendran circa 1960

Rajendran underwent his collegiate education at Madras Christian College (MCC) in Chennai for five years, first two years as an Intermediate student and then in the Honours (Masters) Programme in Physics which spanned three years. During his fourth year at his college hostel, St. Thomas Hall, Rajendran was elected as the Minister for Indoor Games, a position of responsibility.

Rajendran was a stellar student who not only won many prizes in MCC but also was ranked first in the final examination of his Honours degree program conducted by the University of Madras, inviting fame and recognition to his alma mater. He was awarded two gold medals by the University of Madras of which one was the prestigious Jagirdar of Arni Gold Medal that was earlier received by the Nobel Laureate C. V. Raman. Rajendran was also offered a scholarship to pursue research in Theoretical Physics at Tata Institute of Fundamental Research in Mumbai, which he politely declined, to focus on his dream as an IAS aspirant.

== Career ==
=== Demonstrator in physics and IAS preparation ===
Rajendran worked as a demonstrator in Physics at MCC to facilitate his preparation for the Indian Administrative Service examination. He chose this over the position of a lecturer as this gave him more time to prepare for IAS. He was also in charge of hostel discipline and had to monitor the students staying in Selaiyur Hall. The resources provided by the college library and the faculty of the institutional departments aided him in his preparation for IAS. His hard work became fruitful when he emerged as the topper in the IAS examination.

=== Sub Collector ===
Following his IAS training, Rajendran was posted as Assistant Collector in Thanjavur to undergo training in administrative work. On the successful completion of his training in March 1959, he was appointed Sub Collector at Sivakasi, which was the Constituency of the then Chief Minister K. Kamaraj.

=== Under Secretary, Commissioner of Stationery and Printing ===
In 1959, Rajendran was posted as the Under Secretary in the Department of Rural Development which was directly under the Chief Minister. After a few months, he moved to Public Department, also under the Chief Minister. Presented with many challenges during this period, Rajendran showed his merit by dealing with them successfully.

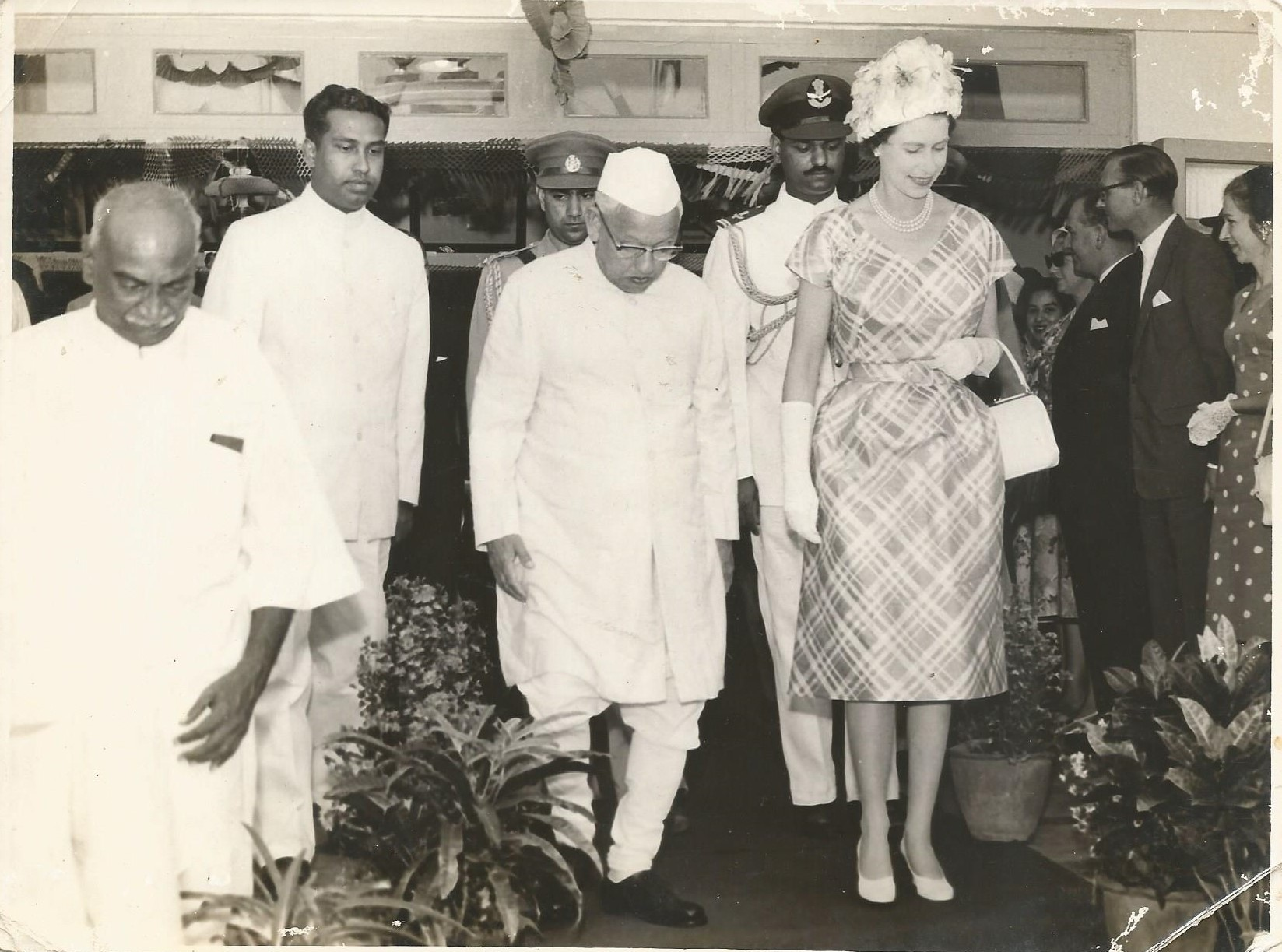
M. M. Rajendran with Queen Elizabeth II and the Former Chief Minister of Tamil Nadu, K. Kamaraj in 1961

In 1961 and 1963, Rajendran was appointed the Assistant Commissioner/Commissioner-in-charge in Chennai Corporation and Commissioner of Stationery and Printing. His responsibilities included the decentralization of civic administration. He took the initiative to establish Regional Presses which improved efficiency besides providing many new job opportunities.

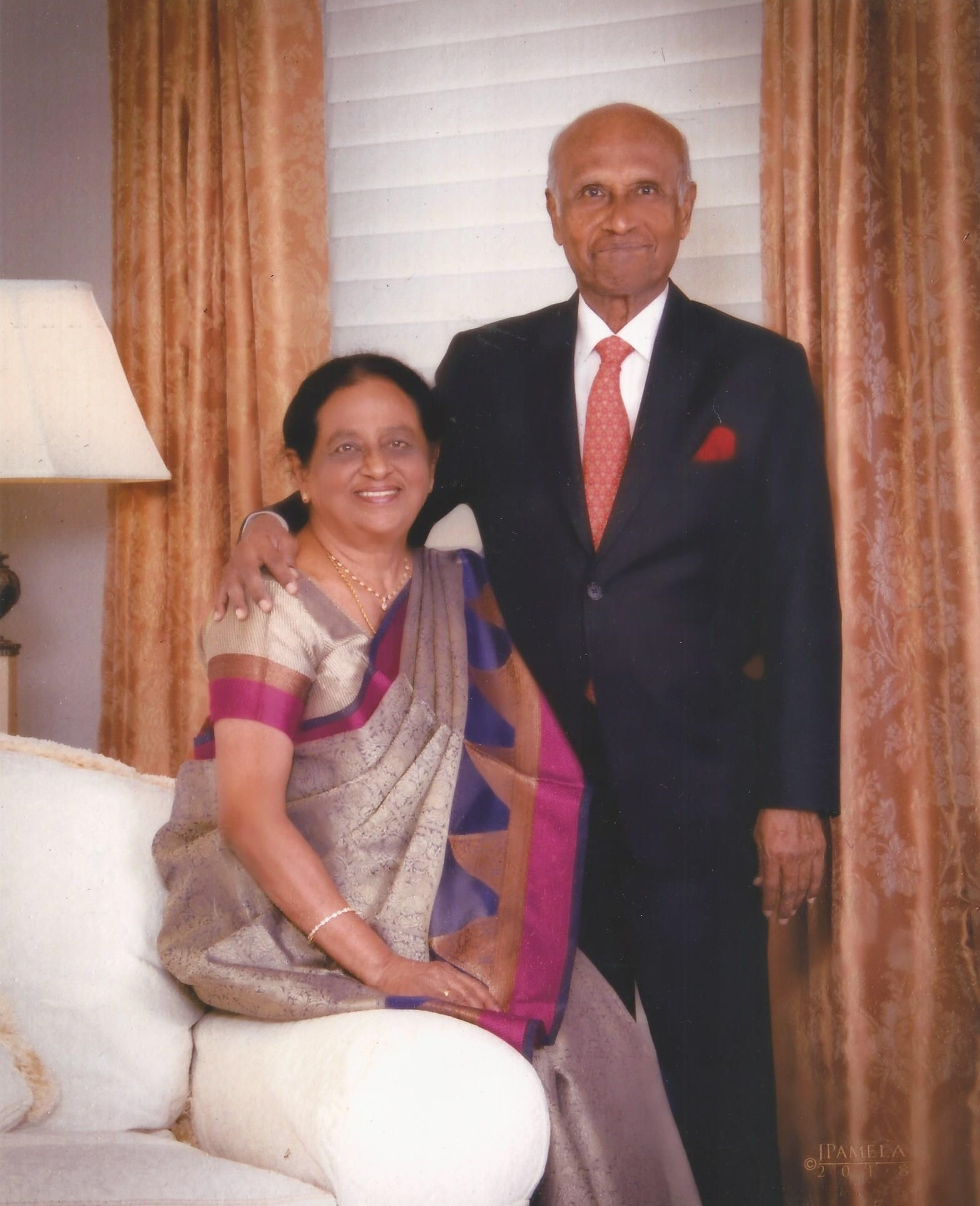
M. M. Rajendran, former Governor of Odisha and his wife, Susheela Rajendran

=== District Collector ===
M. M. Rajendran became the District Collector of Ramanathapuram at the age of 29. A landmark event that proved his resourcefulness was the cyclone that hit Dhanushkodi in 1964. Amidst the losses, casualties and deaths, Rajendran took immediate disaster management measures that ensured that the victims were fed and sheltered until their rehabilitation was completed. Impressed by his administrative prowess, he was given charge of a bigger and problematic district, Tirunelveli, where he was for 3 1/2 years spread equally under Congress and DMK Governments. His objectivity and apolitical approach were established when under Congress government, he redressed the grievances of M. Karunanidhi who was in jail at the time. Notwithstanding his closeness to K. Kamaraj, his career with the opposition DMK was smooth. Rajendran had made many innovative changes in the district administration, endearing him to the people. At the time of Pakistani aggression in 1965, he established a Jawan's Welfare Committee to address the problems faced by the families of Jawans – this was chaired by Susheela Rajendran, his wife, who later received a commendation from the Chief Minister for her work.

=== Commissioner of Labour, Secretary to State Government ===
As Labour Commissioner, he had to tackle many serious problems in Industrial Relations caused by the change of government with many labour unions affiliated with one party or the other. Major industries including “The Hindu” were remaining closed for more than 100 days because of industrial unrest.

Rajendran gave high priority to resolving the outstanding issues through the conciliation process resulting in the reopening of all of them. He was instrumental in setting up Labour Welfare Board and the Institute of Labour Studies.

As Secretary to Government in Departments like Social Welfare, Labour & Employment, Rural and Urban Development and Public Works including irrigation and power, he advised the government in new policy development and in monitoring implementation of programmes. Cauvery waters issue cropped up during his tenure in the latter department for which Rajendran helped in developing a strategy.

=== Chairman of State Housing Board and Tamil Nadu Electricity Board ===
Both were large undertakings of the State Government. He streamlined procedures in the Housing Board in plots/house allotment and in building construction to prevent malpractices. Electricity Board was in shambles with rampant power cuts due as much to insufficiency of power generation as poor maintenance of distribution network. He succeeded in upgrading both and in improving the chaotic human resources practices in the board, having almost 100,000 employees.

=== Joint Secretary in Government of India and UNICEF ===
Of the many roles embraced by M. M. Rajendran during his career, his initiatives as Joint Secretary in the Ministry of Education and Social Welfare specializing in Nutrition and Child Development gave him global recognition. He authored the Integrated Child Development Services (ICDS) Scheme which received national and international recognition.

Rajendran became a member of the executive board of UNICEF and vice-chairman of its program committee. In 1981, he became senior advisor in UNICEF headquarters in New York and retained this position for over five years before returning to India to be appointed the vigilance commissioner and commissioner for administrative reforms of Tamil Nadu.

=== Chief Secretary, Government of Tamil Nadu ===
On 5 February 1988, Rajendran was appointed Chief Secretary of Tamil Nadu under President's rule. He was instrumental in bringing many positive changes in the state including grievance redressal mechanism, ban on smoking in public offices and enhancing state revenues. His tenure of 3 years, included one year of President's Rule and two years under an elected government, was noted for rapid industrial development, high integrity in administration and protection given to honest and efficient officers.

=== Secretary to Government of India and Retirement ===
One of the notable positions taken by Rajendran was that of the Secretary to the Government of India. He served this role in two ministries and finally retired as an IAS Officer in 1993.

=== Governor of Odisha ===
Rajendran was sworn in as the Governor of Odisha in 1999 a few days after a supercyclone hit the state causing large-scale destruction.

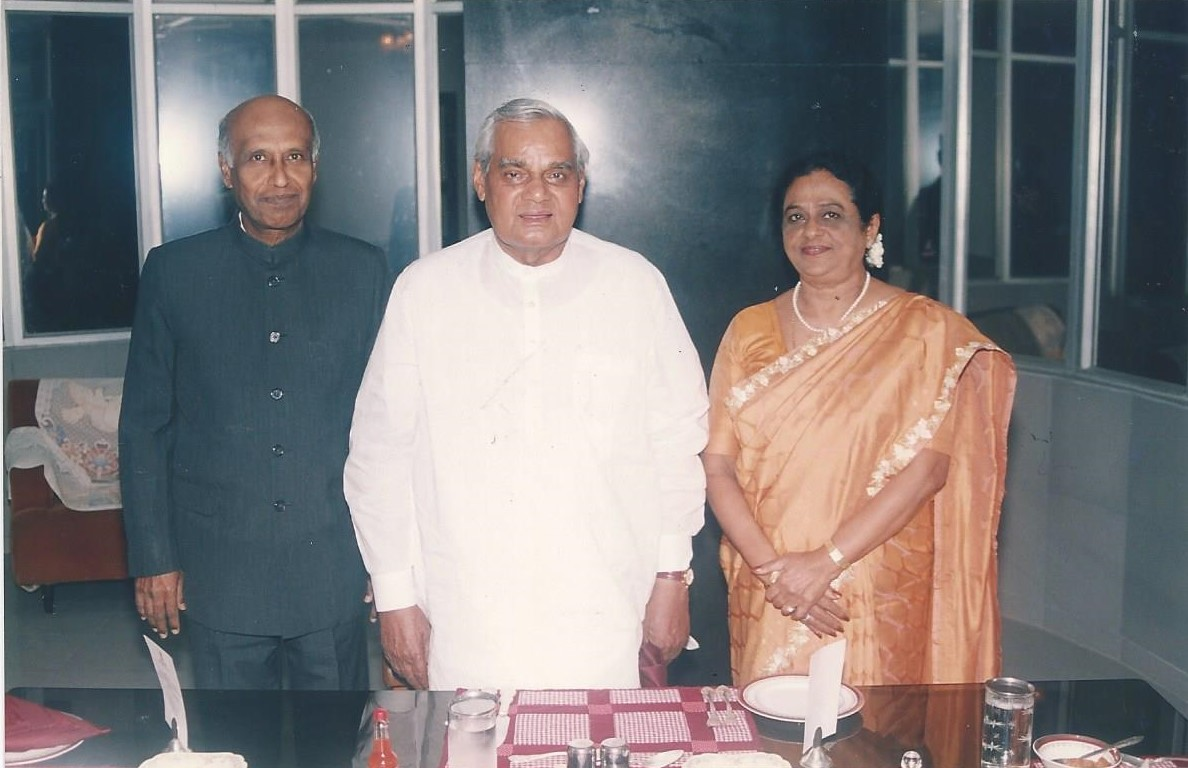
M. M. Rajendran and Susheela Rajendran with former Prime Minister of India, Atal Bihari Vajpayee

Rajendran's experience in relief and rehabilitation stemming from his encounter with the cyclone in Dhanushkodi in 1964, helped him set up an efficient response plan to disasters. He stretched the parameters of his role as the constitutional head of the state to ensure complete rehabilitation of the state while staying within constitutional limits. His efforts which included field visits, collaboration with the government of Andhra Pradesh to enhance relief work, comprehensive planning to reconstruct the cyclone-affected areas and team building was recognized as timely and impressive. He established emergency procedures for disaster management and was responsible for having shelters built along the coastal areas of Odisha. According to DT Next, an English newspaper by Dina Thanthi, Rajendran's initiatives to put on ground disaster preparedness measures for “ cyclone management helped save thousands of lives when Cyclone Fani made landfall on May 3, 2019.”

Rajendran's contribution to the development of higher education, particularly in upgrading the Universities, making use of the independence the Orissa Universities Act it gave to the governor as chancellor in administering universities was noteworthy and came for praise from the academic community. Upgrading of syllabi, tightening up regulations governing award of Ph.D., protection of universities from political interference and merit-based appointment of vice chancellors and faculty were hailed by Dr Harii Gautam, the then chairman of University Grants Commission as momentous steps in University administration.

Rajendran maintained an excellent relationship with all the three chief ministers with whom he worked and completed his tenure as governor in 2004.

== Personal life ==
M. M. Rajendran married Susheela Devapragasam on October 21, 1959. They have two sons, one daughter and seven grandchildren. Their daughter, Suma married Dr. David Jayakar, M.D on May 28, 1990. David and Suma have two children, Sujay Jayakar and Stephen Jayakar.

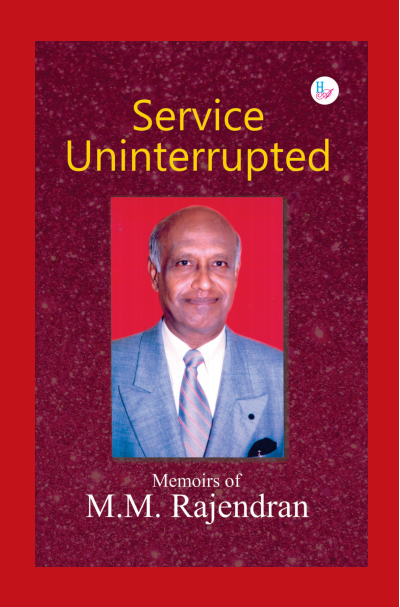
Service Uninterrupted: Memoirs of M. M. Rajendran

== Literary works ==
In 1980, he edited the book “Profile of Child in India” published by UNICEF. Papers presented by him in International Conferences on “Integrated Approach to Child Development” in Alma Ata, USSR and “Innovative approaches to meet basic needs of the young child in Developing Countries” in Athens were well received and published in international journals. In 1979 UNICEF published the book “Child Welfare Services in China” based on his visit to China on an invitation from Chinese government. His Report on “Production and Marketing of Infant Foods” published by Government of India in 1981 led to the adoption of the “Indian National Code for protection and promotion of Breast Feeding”.

Rajendran published two books in 2003 and 2004 titled "Let Us Make Things Happen: A Collection of Speeches" and "Opportunities Unbound: A Collection of Speeches" respectively, which are compilations of important speeches that he had delivered on various occasions. In 2020, he published his memoir Service Uninterrupted: Memoirs of M. M. Rajendran which documents his journey in fulfilling his ultimate goal of serving the nation by bringing positive changes in India after joining the Indian Administrative Service. This Memoir gives insights into the political and administrative processes that are narrated through the first-hand experiences of the author. It documents personal and political histories and recounts landmark moments in the history of Tamil Nadu, Orissa and India. Reviewing this book, Deccan Chronicle described him as a “Model Governor” who was “not just a figure head but one who could contribute to the running of the State by good and timely advice.”

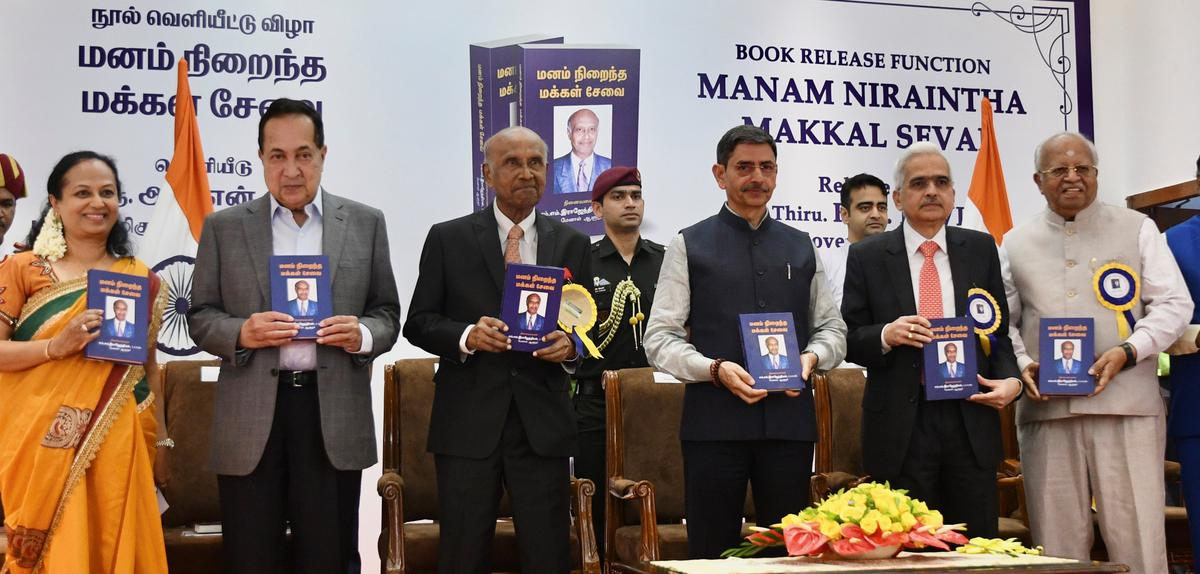
M.M. Rajendran's memoir, Manam Niraintha Makkal Sevai, being launched by R.N. Ravi, Governor of Tamil Nadu at Raj Bhavan, Chennai. The dignitaries onstage (from left) are Suma Jayakar, Director of South Asian Initiatives, LeTourneau University and daughter of M.M. Rajendran; N. Ram, Director, The Hindu Publishing Group; M.M. Rajendran; R.N. Ravi, the Governor of Tamil Nadu; Shaktikanta Das, the Governor of the Reserve Bank of India; and Justice T. N. Vallinayagam, Former Judge, Madras High Court.

In September 2022, the Tamil edition of Service Uninterrupted: Memoirs of M. M. Rajendran titled Manam Niraintha Makkal Sevai was released. The book was launched by the governor of Tamil Nadu, R. N. Ravi, at Raj Bhavan, Chennai, in the presence of several dignitaries including the Governor of the Reserve Bank of India, the director of The Hindu newspaper and a former judge of the Madras High Court. M. M. Rajendran's daughter, Suma Jayakar, was also present during the book launch.

Preceded by C. Rangarajan	Governor of Odisha; 1999–2004	Succeeded by Rameshwar Thakur
