= 2014 Indian general election in Odisha =

Indian general election in Odisha, 2014
- 10 & 17 April 2014

21 seats
- Turnout: 73.79% (▲8.44%)
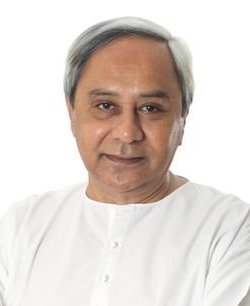

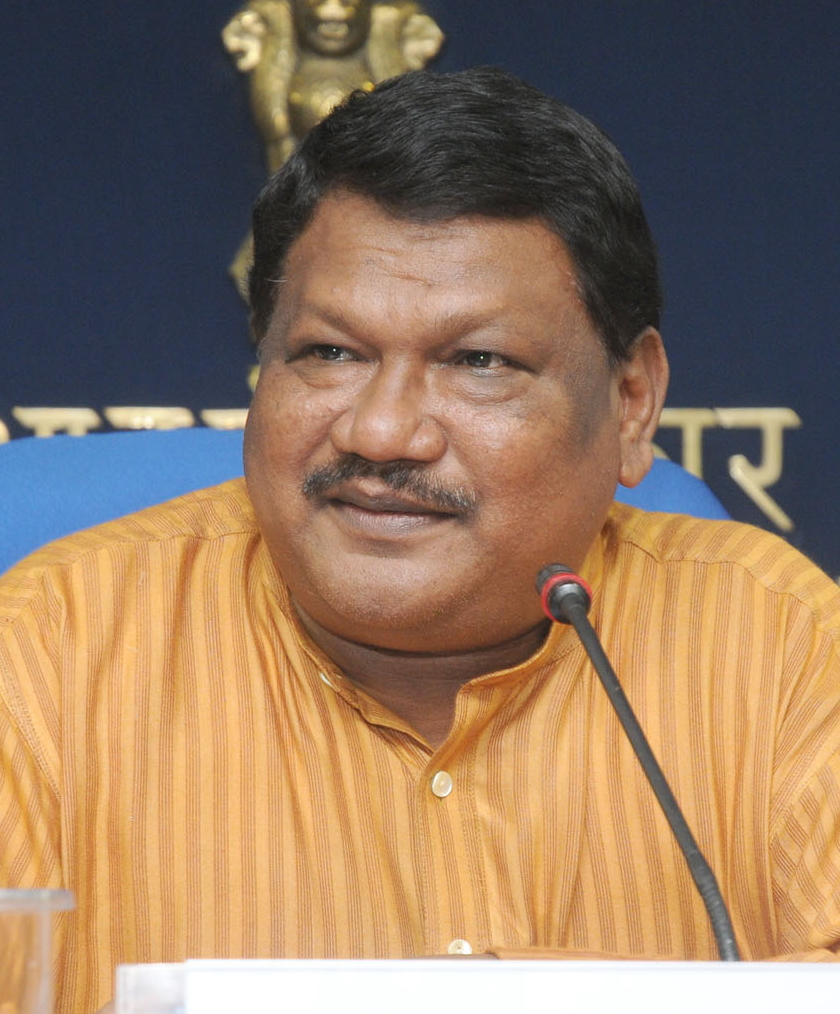

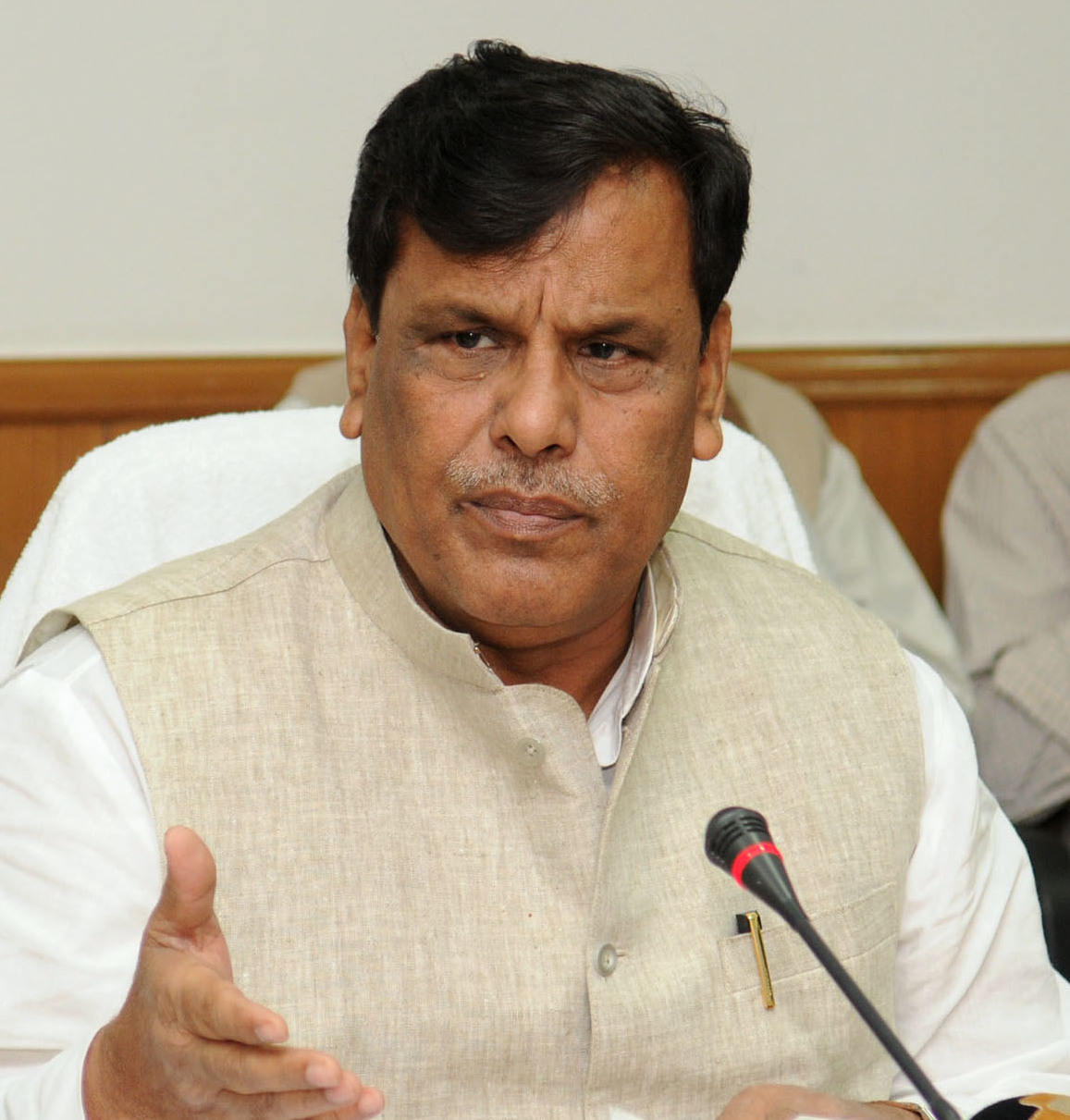
	First party	Second party	Third party
Leader	Naveen Patnaik	Jual Oram	Srikant Kumar Jena
Party	BJD	BJP	INC
Alliance		NDA	UPA
Leader since	1996	2014	2009
Leader's seat	did not contest	Sundargarh (won)	Balasore (lost)
Seats before	14	0	6
Seats won	20	1	0
Seat change	▲6	▲1	▼6
Popular vote	94,89,946	46,38,565	55,91,380
Percentage	44.77%	21.88%	26.38%
- Seatwise Result Map of the 2014 general election in Odisha
Prime Minister before election
Manmohan Singh
INC
Elected Prime Minister
Narendra Modi
BJP

The 2014 Indian general election polls in Odisha for 21 Lok Sabha seats were held in two phases on 10 and 17 April 2014.

The major contenders in the state were Biju Janata Dal, Indian National Congress and Bharatiya Janata Party. The assembly elections were held simultaneously with the general elections in the state.

== Election schedule ==
The constituency-wise election schedule is as follows.

Polling day	Phase	Date	Constituencies	Vote percentage
1	3	10 April	Aska, Bargarh, Berhampur, Bolangir, Kalahandi, Kandhamal, Koraput, Nabarangpur, Sambalpur, Sundargarh	67
2	5	17 April	Balasore, Bhadrak, Bhubaneswar, Cuttack, Dhenkanal, Jagatsinghpur, Jajpur, Kendrapara, Keonjhar, Mayurbhanj, Puri	70

== Parties and alliances ==
=== Biju Janata Dal ===
Party	Flag	Symbol	Leader	Seats contested
Biju Janata Dal			Naveen Patnaik	21

=== National Democratic Alliance ===
Party	Flag	Symbol	Leader	Seats contested
Bharatiya Janata Party			Jual Oram	21

=== United Progressive Alliance ===
Party	Flag	Symbol	Leader	Seats contested
Indian National Congress			Srikant Kumar Jena	21

== List of Candidates ==
Constituency							
Constituency		BJD		BJP		INC	
1	Bargarh	BJD	Prabhas Kumar Singh	BJP	Subash Chouhan	INC	Sanjay Bhoi
2	Sundargarh	BJD	Dilip Kumar Tirkey	BJP	Jual Oram	INC	Hemanand Biswal
3	Sambalpur	BJD	Nagendra Kumar Pradhan	BJP	Suresh Pujari	INC	Amarnath Pradhan
4	Keonjhar	BJD	Sakuntala Laguri	BJP	Ananta Nayak	INC	Madhab Sardar
5	Mayurbhanj	BJD	Rama Chandra Hansdah	BJP	Nepole Raghu Murmu	INC	Shyam Sundar Hansdah
6	Balasore	BJD	Rabindra Kumar Jena	BJP	Pratap Chandra Sarangi	INC	Srikant Kumar Jena
7	Bhadrak	BJD	Arjun Charan Sethi	BJP	Sarat Das	INC	Sangram Keshari Jena
8	Jajpur	BJD	Rita Tarai	BJP	Amiya Kanta Mallick	INC	Asok Das
9	Dhenkanal	BJD	Tathagata Satpathy	BJP	Rudra Narayan Pany	INC	Sudhir Kumar Samal
10	Bolangir	BJD	Kalikesh Narayan Singh Deo	BJP	Sangeeta Kumari Singh Deo	INC	Sarat Pattanayak
11	Kalahandi	BJD	Arka Keshari Deo	BJP	Pradipta Kumar Naik	INC	Bhakta Charan Das
12	Nabarangpur	BJD	Balabhadra Majhi	BJP	Parsuram Majhi	INC	Pradeep Kumar Majhi
13	Kandhamal	BJD	Hemendra Chandra Singh	BJP	Sukanta Kumar Panigrahi	INC	Harihar Karan
14	Cuttack	BJD	Bhartruhari Mahtab	BJP	Samir Dey	INC	Aparajita Mohanty
15	Kendrapara	BJD	Baijayant Panda	BJP	Bishnu Prasad Das	INC	Dharanidhar Nayak
16	Jagatsinghpur	BJD	Kulamani Samal	BJP	Baidhar Mallick	INC	Bibhu Prasad Tarai
17	Puri	BJD	Pinaki Misra	BJP	Ashok Sahu	INC	Sucharita Mohanty
18	Bhubaneswar	BJD	Prasanna Kumar Patasani	BJP	Prithviraj Harichandan	INC	Bijay Mohanty
19	Aska	BJD	Ladu Kishore Swain	BJP	Mahesh Chandra Mohanty	INC	Srilokanath Ratha
20	Berhampur	BJD	Sidhant Mohapatra	BJP	Rama Chandra Panda	INC	Chandra Sekhar Sahu
21	Koraput	BJD	Jhina Hikaka	BJP	Sibasankar Ulaka	INC	Giridhar Gamang

== Opinion poll ==
Conducted in month(s)	Ref.	Polling organisation/agency				
Conducted in month(s)	Ref.	Polling organisation/agency	INC	BJP	BJD	CPI(M)
Aug–Oct 2013		Times Now-India TV-CVoter	9	0	12	0
Dec 2013 – Jan 2014		India Today-CVoter	8	0	13	0
Jan–Feb 2014		Times Now-India TV-CVoter	7	2	12	0
March 2014		NDTV- Hansa Research	3	1	17	0
March–April 2014		CNN-IBN-Lokniti-CSDS	4	0	16	1

== Result ==
20	1
BJD	BJP

Party Name	Popular vote			Seats		
Party Name	Votes	%	±pp	Contested	Won	+/−
BJD	94,89,946	44.08	▲6.85	21	20	▲6
INC	55,91,380	25.97	▼6.78	21	0	▼6
BJP	46,38,565	21.55	▲4.66	21	1	▲1
CPI	65,667	0.30	Steady	4	0	Steady
CPI(M)	52,698	0.24	Steady	5	0	Steady
JMM	1,72,984	0.80	Steady	1	0	Steady
AAP	1,47,888	0.69	Steady	18	0	Steady
BSP	2,18,403	1.01	Steady	21	0	Steady
AITC	30,717	0.14	Steady	5	0	Steady
Others	4,54,673	2.11	Steady	47	0	Steady
IND	3,33,196	1.55	▼0.78	32	0	Steady
Total	2,15,28,883	100%	-	196	21	-

== Elected members ==
The results of the elections were declared on 16 May 2014.

Keys: BJD (20) BJP (1)

Constituency		Winner				Runner Up				Margin	%
#	Name	Candidate	Party	Votes	%	Candidate	Party	Votes	%	Margin	%
1	Bargarh	Prabhas Kumar Singh	BJD	383,230	34.03	Subash Chouhan	BJP	372,052	33.04	11,178	0.99
2	Sundargarh	Jual Oram	BJP	340,508	33.69	Dilip Kumar Tirkey	BJD	321,679	31.83	18,829	1.86
3	Sambalpur	Nagendra Pradhan	BJD	358,618	36.42	Suresh Pujari	BJP	328,042	33.31	30,576	3.11
4	Keonjhar	Sakuntala Laguri	BJD	434,471	40.06	Ananta Nayak	BJP	277,154	25.55	157,317	14.51
5	Mayurbhanj	Rama Chandra Hansdah	BJD	393,779	37.34	Nepole Raghu Murmu	BJP	270,913	25.69	122,866	11.65
6	Balasore	Rabindra Kumar Jena	BJD	433,768	41.32	Pratap Chandra Sarangi	BJP	291,943	27.81	141,825	13.51
7	Bhadrak	Arjun Charan Sethi	BJD	502,338	46.43	Sangram Keshari Jena	INC	322,979	29.85	179,359	16.58
8	Jajpur	Rita Tarai	BJD	541,349	55.14	Asok Das	INC	221,078	22.52	320,271	32.62
9	Dhenkanal	Tathagata Satpathy	BJD	453,277	43.50	Rudra Narayan Pany	BJP	315,937	30.32	137,340	13.18
10	Bolangir	Kalikesh Narayan Singh Deo	BJD	453,519	38.73	Sangeeta Kumari Singh Deo	BJP	349,220	29.82	104,299	8.91
11	Kalahandi	Arka Keshari Deo	BJD	370,871	33.18	Pradipta Kumar Naik	BJP	314,524	28.14	56,347	5.04
12	Nabarangpur	Balabhadra Majhi	BJD	373,887	36.58	Pradeep Kumar Majhi	INC	371,845	36.38	2,042	0.20
13	Kandhamal	Hemendra Chandra Singh	BJD	421,458	50.19	Harihar Karan	INC	240,441	28.63	181,017	21.56
14	Cuttack	Bhartruhari Mahtab	BJD	526,085	53.65	Aparajita Mohanty	INC	219,323	22.37	306,762	31.28
15	Kendrapara	Baijayant Panda	BJD	600,023	52.74	Dharanidhar Nayak	INC	390,723	34.35	209,300	18.39
16	Jagatsinghpur	Kulamani Samal	BJD	624,492	55.12	Bibhu Prasad Tarai	INC	348,098	30.73	276,394	24.39
17	Puri	Pinaki Misra	BJD	523,161	50.33	Sucharita Mohanty	INC	259,800	24.99	263,361	25.34
18	Bhubaneswar	Prasanna Kumar Patasani	BJD	439,252	49.25	Prithviraj Harichandan	BJP	249,775	28.00	189,477	21.25
19	Aska	Ladu Kishore Swain	BJD	541,473	60.40	Srilokanath Ratha	INC	229,476	25.60	311,997	34.80
20	Berhampur	Sidhant Mohapatra	BJD	398,107	43.94	Chandra Sekhar Sahu	INC	270,387	29.85	127,720	14.09
21	Koraput	Jhina Hikaka	BJD	395,109	39.88	Giridhar Gamang	INC	375,781	37.93	19,328	1.95

== Post-election Union Council of Ministers from Odisha ==
#	Name	Constituency	Designation	Department	From	To	Party
1	Jual Oram	Sundargarh (ST)	Cabinet Minister	Tribal Affairs	27 May 2014	30 May 2019	BJP

== Assembly segments wise lead of parties ==
Party	Assembly segments	Position in Assembly (as of 2014 simultaneous elections)
Biju Janata Dal	116	117
Bharatiya Janata Party	20	10
Indian National Congress	11	16
Others	–	4
Total	147	
