= Bargarh Lok Sabha constituency =

Lok Sabha Constituency in Odisha

Coordinates: 21.347144°N 83.628632°E

Bargarh OD-1
- Lok Sabha constituency
- Interactive Map Outlining Bargarh Lok Sabha constituency

Constituency details
- Country: India
- Region: East India
- State: Odisha
- Assembly constituencies: Padampur; Bijepur; Bargarh; Attabira; Bhatli; Brajarajnagar; Jharsuguda
- Established: 1951
- Total electors: 16,33,893 (Note: as on 2024) (Note: as data published by election commission)
- Reservation: None

Member of Parliament
- 18th Lok Sabha
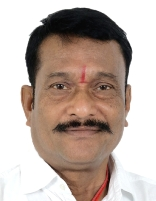
- Incumbent Pradip Purohit
- Party: BJP
- Elected year: 2024

Bargarh Lok Sabha constituency is one of the 21 Lok Sabha parliamentary constituencies in Odisha state in eastern India.

This constituency came into existence in 2008 as a part of the implementation of delimitation of parliamentary constituencies based on the recommendations of the Delimitation Commission of India in 2002. Before 2008, some of the constituencies were in Deogarh.

== Assembly Segments ==
Presently, Bargarh Lok Sabha constituency comprises 7 legislative assembly segments, which are:

#	Name	District	Member	Party	Leading (in 2024)
1	Padampur	Bargarh	Barsha Singh Bariha	BJD	BJP
2	Bijepur	Bargarh	Sanat Kumar Gartia	BJP	BJP
3	Bargarh	Bargarh	Ashwini Kumar Sarangi	BJP	BJP
4	Attabira (SC)	Bargarh	Nihar Ranjan Mahanand	BJP	BJP
5	Bhatli	Bargarh	Irasis Acharya	BJP	BJP
6	Brajarajnagar	Jharsuguda	Suresh Pujari	BJP	BJP
7	Jharsuguda	Jharsuguda	Tankadhar Tripathy	BJP	BJP

Padampur, Bijepur, Bargarh and Bhatli legislative assembly segments were earlier in erstwhile Sambalpur constituency.

== Elected members ==
Vote share of winning candidates
2024	54.69%
2019	46.58%
2014	34.11%
2009	43.20%

Since its formation in 1951, 5 elections have been held till date.

List of members elected from Bargarh constituency are

Year	Member	Party
2024	Pradip Purohit	Bharatiya Janata Party
2019	Suresh Pujari	Bharatiya Janata Party
2014	Prabhas Kumar Singh	Biju Janata Dal
2009	Sanjay Bhoi	Indian National Congress
1956-2008 : Constituency did not exist
1951	Ghanshyam Das Thirani	Independent politician

== Election results ==
=== 2024 ===
Voting were held on 20th May 2024 in 5th phase of Indian General Election. Counting of votes was on 4th June 2024. In 2024 election, Bharatiya Janata Party candidate Pradip Purohit defeated Biju Janata Dal candidate Parinita Mishra by a margin of 2,51,667 votes.

2024 Indian general election: Bargarh
Party	Candidate	Votes	%	±%
BJP	Pradip Purohit	716,359	54.69	
BJD	Parinita Mishra	4,64,692	35.48	
INC	Sanjay Bhoi	93,551	7.14	
NOTA	None of the above	12,541	0.91	
Majority		2,51,667	19.21	
Turnout		13,12,526	80.33	
BJP hold				

=== 2019 ===
In 2019 election, Bharatiya Janata Party candidate Suresh Pujari defeated Biju Janata Dal candidate Prasanna Acharya by a margin of 63,939 votes.

2019 Indian general elections: Bargarh
Party	Candidate	Votes	%	±%
BJP	Suresh Pujari	581,245	46.58	
BJD	Prasanna Acharya	5,17,306	41.45	
INC	Pradeep Kumar Debta	1,09,417	8.77	
NOTA	None of the above	14,167	1.14	
BSP	Kousika Suna	11,056	0.89	
Majority		63,939	5.13	
Turnout		12,51,078	78.37	−0.34
BJP gain from BJD				

=== 2014 ===
In 2014 election, Biju Janata Dal candidate Prabhas Kumar Singh defeated Bharatiya Janata Party candidate Subash Chouhan by a margin of 11,178 votes.

2014 Indian general elections: Bargarh
Party	Candidate	Votes	%	±%
BJD	Prabhas Kumar Singh	383,230	34.11	
BJP	Subash Chouhan	3,72,052	33.12	
INC	Sanjay Bhoi	2,74,610	24.44	
PVP	Kulamani Urma	26,216	2.33	
CPI	Ashok Bisi	21,100	1.87	
AAP	Lingaraj	15,672	1.39	
NOTA	None of the above	14,500	1.29	
Majority		11,178	0.99	
Turnout		11,26,153	78.71	
BJD gain from INC				

=== 2009 ===
In 2009 election, Indian National Congress candidate Sanjay Bhoi defeated Biju Janata Dal candidate Hamid Hussain by a margin of 98,444 votes.

2009 Indian general elections: Bargarh
Party	Candidate	Votes	%	±%
INC	Sanjay Bhoi	397,375	43.20	
BJD	Dr. Hamid Hussain	2,98,931	32.49	
BJP	Radharani Panda	1,57,750	17.15	
BSP	Sunil Kumar Agrawal	25,710	2.79	
Majority		98,444	10.70	
Turnout		9,19,625	69.65	
INC win (new seat)				

== See also ==
- Bargarh district
- List of constituencies of the Lok Sabha
