= Ersama Assembly constituency =

Former constituency of the Odisha Legislative Assembly

Ersama
- Former constituency for the Odisha Legislative Assembly

Constituency details
- Country: India
- Region: East India
- State: Odisha
- District: Jagatsinghpur
- Lok Sabha constituency: Jagatsinghpur
- Established: 1951
- Abolished: 2008
- Reservation: None

Ersama was an Assembly constituency from Jagatsinghpur district to Odisha. It was established in 1951 and abolished in 2008 following Delimitation. It was subsumed into the Balikuda-Erasama Assembly constituency.

== Elected members ==
Between 1952 & 2008, 13 elections were held.

List of members elected from Ersama constituency are:

Year	Member	Party
1952	Gourishyam Nayak	Indian National Congress
1957	Lokanath Choudhury	Communist Party of India
1961	Ratnamali Jema	Indian National Congress
1967	Lokanath Choudhury	Communist Party of India
1971	Narayan Birabar Samanta	Utkal Congress
1974	Lokanath Choudhury	Communist Party of India
1977	Damodar Rout	Janata Party
1980	Damodar Rout	Janata Party (Secular)
1985	Krushna Chandra Swain	Indian National Congress
1990	Damodar Rout	Janata Dal
1995	Bijaya Kumar Nayak	Indian National Congress
2000	Damodar Rout	Biju Janata Dal
2004	Damodar Rout	Biju Janata Dal
