= Irasis Acharya =

Indian politician

Member of Odisha Legislative Assembly
- Incumbent
- Assumed office 4 June 2024
- Preceded by: Susanta Singh
- Constituency: Bhatli

Personal details
- Party: Bharatiya Janata Party
- Education: University of Delhi (LL.B.); Cardiff University (LL.M.)
- Profession: Politician

Irasis Acharya is an Indian politician from Odisha and a member of the Bharatiya Janata Party (BJP). He has been a member of the Odisha Legislative Assembly from Bhatli since June 2024. He was previously the state president of the Odisha unit of the Bharatiya Janata Yuva Morcha, the youth wing of the BJP, and was appointed a secretary of the BJP's Odisha unit in 2023.

== Education and academic career ==
Acharya completed a Master of Laws degree at Cardiff University in 2013. He also holds an LL.B. from the Faculty of Law, University of Delhi.

He joined KIIT University as an assistant professor in September 2013 and was listed on its faculty in 2017.

== Political career ==
Acharya was a state secretary of the Odisha unit of the Bharatiya Janata Yuva Morcha (BJYM) by March 2018. By June 2020, he was its state president. He was appointed a secretary of the BJP's Odisha unit in August 2023.

In 2025, following the announcement of notified area council status for Sohela, residents felicitated Acharya for advancing the longstanding demand.

=== Elections ===
Acharya contested the 2019 Odisha Legislative Assembly election from Bhatli as the BJP candidate. He received 75,434 votes (around 41%) and lost to Susanta Singh of the Biju Janata Dal by 23,232 votes. He contested Bhatli again in the 2024 election and won with 107,508 votes (around 55%), defeating Susanta Singh by 27,892 votes. He took office on 4 June 2024.

=== Political activism ===
In November 2021, police detained Acharya and other opposition workers in Bhatli ahead of Chief Minister Naveen Patnaik's visit to Bargarh.

On 28 February 2023, Acharya and 21 other BJYM activists were arrested in Bhubaneswar following a clash with police during a rally protesting the state's law and order situation and demanding a CBI inquiry into minister Naba Das's killing. About 20 police personnel were reported injured. BJYM leaders alleged excessive police force and false charges. The Orissa High Court granted bail on 20 April 2023, and Acharya was released from Jharpada Special Jail on 22 April 2023.

== Legal proceedings ==
Acharya was arrested in July 2018 in connection with a fatal shooting in Bhatli on 1 June that year. He described the arrest as politically motivated, and BJYM activists protested against it. On 6 January 2025, a court in Bargarh acquitted him and three other defendants. His lawyer attributed the acquittal to lack of evidence.

His 2024 election affidavit declared six pending criminal cases and no convictions.
