= Lakshman Mallick =

Indian politician

Member of Parliament, Lok Sabha
- In office 1980–1989
- Preceded by: Pradyumna Kishore Bal
- Succeeded by: Lokanath Choudhary
- Constituency: Jagatsinghpurl, Odisha

Personal details
- Born: 12 November 1927 Badakhandaita, Cuttack district, Odisha, British India
- Died: 19 October 2014 (aged 86)
- Party: Indian National Congress
- Spouse: Haramoni Mallick

Lakshman Mallick also spelt Laxman is an Indian politician. He was elected to the Lok Sabha, the lower house of the Parliament of India as a member of the Indian National Congress.
