= Bijaya Ranjan Singh Bariha =

Indian politician (died 2022)

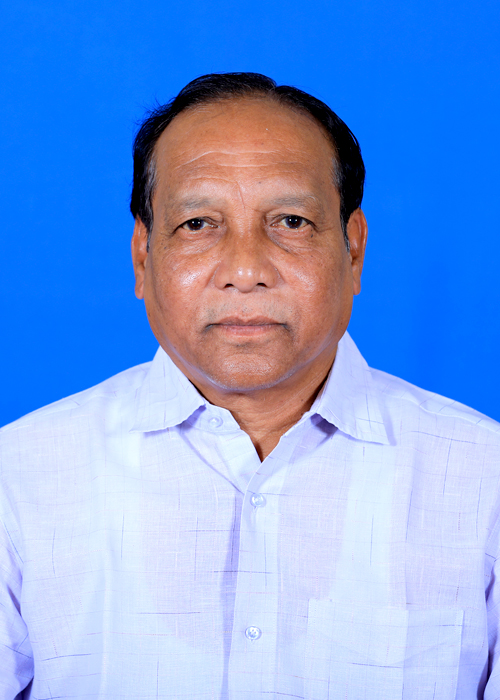

Member of Odisha Legislative Assembly
- In office 2019–2022
- Preceded by: Pradip Purohit
- Succeeded by: Barsha Singh Bariha
- Constituency: Padampur
- In office 2009–2014
- Preceded by: Satyabhusan Sahu
- Succeeded by: Pradip Purohit
- Constituency: Padampur
- In office 1990–2004
- Preceded by: Satyabhusan Sahu
- Succeeded by: Satyabhusan Sahu
- Constituency: Padampur

Personal details
- Born: 20 January 1958 (age 68) Padampur, Odisha, India
- Died: 3 October 2022 Bhubaneswar, India
- Party: Biju Janta Dal
- Other political affiliations: Janata Dal
- Spouse: Tilottama Singh Bariha
- Children: Barsha Singh Bariha
- Education: Post Graduate
- Alma mater: Jawaharlal Nehru University

Bijaya Ranjan Singh Bariha was an Indian politician and former minister from Odisha. He served as a member of the legislative assembly (MLA) for Padampur Assembly constituency of Padmapur, Odisha. He was a senior leader of the Biju Janata Dal.

He died on 3 October 2022 after a prolonged illness.

== Career ==
Bariha was elected to the state assembly from the Padampur seat in Bargarh district a total of five times. This included two victories on Janata Dal ticket in 1990 and 1995, followed by three consecutive wins on BJD tickets in 2000, 2009, and 2019.

In addition to his electoral success, Bariha actively participated in various key committees within the state assembly. He served on committees focusing on drought management, estimates, environmental conservation, forest protection, library affairs, public accounts, and the committee on linguistic minorities.

He also held the position of SC, ST Development Minister in Chief Minister Naveen Patnaik’s cabinet from 2009 to 2011.
