= Alka Mohanty =

Indian Politician

Alaka Mohanty
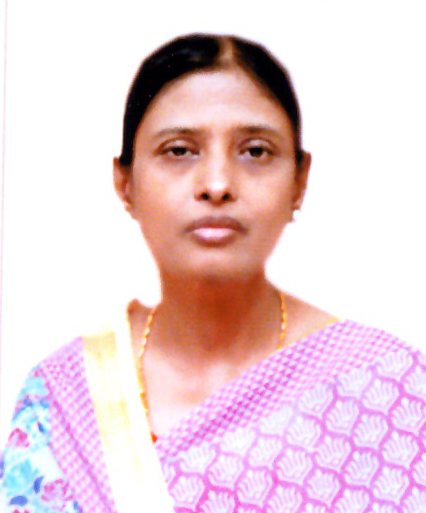

Member of the Odisha Legislative Assembly
- In office 3 June 2022 – 2024
- Preceded by: Kishore Kumar Mohanty
- Succeeded by: Suresh Pujari
- Constituency: Brajarajnagar

Personal details
- Born: 5 May 1967 (age 58)
- Citizenship: Indian
- Party: Biju Janata Dal
- Spouse: Kishore Kumar Mohanty
- Parent: Nabin Chandra Pattanaik (father)
- Occupation: politician

Alka Mohanty, also spelt as 'Alaka Mohanty, is an Indian Politician and wife of Kishore Kumar Mohanty who served as Member of Odisha Legislative Assembly from Brajarajnagar Assembly constituency.
