= Bhatli Assembly constituency =

Constituency of the Odisha legislative assembly in India

Coordinates: 21.47°N 83.54°E

Bhatli
- Constituency No. 5 for the Odisha Legislative Assembly

Constituency details
- Country: India
- Region: East India
- State: Odisha
- Division: Northern Division
- District: Bargarh
- Lok Sabha constituency: Bargarh
- Established: 1952
- Total electors: 2,32,280 (Note: as on 2024) (Note: as data published by election commission)
- Reservation: None

Member of Legislative Assembly
- 17th Odisha Legislative Assembly
- Incumbent Irasis Acharya
- Party: Bharatiya Janata Party
- Elected year: 2024

Bhatli is an Assembly constituency of Bargarh district in Odisha State. It was established in 1952 as Sohella.

== Extent of Assembly Constituencies ==
- Sohella Block
- Bhatli Block
- Ambabhona Block.

== Elected members ==
Vote share of winning candidates
2024	54.65%
2019	53.04%
2014	43%
2009	42.58%
2004	42.08%
2000	64.47%
1995	34.77%
1990	45.44%
1985	58.97%
1980	67.69%
1977	50.72%

Since its formation in 1952, 17 elections were held till date. In 1952, It was known as Sohella and was a 2 member constituency. From 1957, It came to known as Bhatli.

List of members elected from Bhatli constituency are:

Year	Member	Party
As Sohella Constituency
1952 (Note: It was a 2 member Constituency)	Bhikari Sahu (Note: representing Sohella)	Indian National Congress
1952	Bisi Bibhar (Note: representing Sohella (ST))	Indian National Congress
As Bhatli constituency
1957	Natabar Banchhor	Communist Party of India
1961	Saraswati Pradhan	Indian National Congress
1967	Saraswati Pradhan	Indian National Congress
1971	Kunja Bihari Naik	Indian National Congress (R)
1974	Mohan Nag	Indian National Congress
1977	Bimbadhar Kuanr	Janata Party
1980	Mohan Nag	Indian National Congress (I)
1985	Mohan Nag	Indian National Congress
1990	Kumar Behera	Janata Dal
1995	Mohan Nag	Indian National Congress
2000	Bimbadhar Kuanr	Bharatiya Janata Party
2004	Bimbadhar Kuanr	Bharatiya Janata Party
2009	Susanta Singh	Biju Janata Dal
2014	Susanta Singh	Biju Janata Dal
2019	Susanta Singh	Biju Janata Dal
2024	Irasis Acharya	Bharatiya Janata Party

== Election results ==
=== 2024 ===
Voting were held on 20 May 2024 in 2nd phase of Odisha Assembly Election & 5th phase of Indian General Election. Counting of votes was on 4 June 2024. In 2024 election, Bharatiya Janata Party candidate Irasis Acharya defeated Biju Janata Dal candidate Susanta Singh by a margin of 27,892 votes.

2024 Odisha Vidhan Sabha Election: Bhatli
Party	Candidate	Votes	%	±%
BJP	Irasis Acharya	107,508	54.65	
BJD	Susanta Singh	79,616	40.47	
INC	Brahma Mahakud	4614	2.35	
NOTA	None of the above	1229	0.62	
Majority		27,892	14.18	
Turnout		1,96,714	84.69	
BJP gain from BJD				

=== 2019 ===
In 2019 election, Biju Janata Dal candidate Susanta Singh defeated Bharatiya Janata Party candidate Irasis Acharya by a margin of 23,232 votes.

2019 Odisha Vidhan Sabha Election: Bhatli
Party	Candidate	Votes	%	±%
BJD	Susanta Singh	98,666	53.04	▲8.42
BJP	Irasis Acharya	75,434	40.55	▲23.13
INC	Saroj Kumar Mahapatra	8,375	4.5	▼1.74
NOTA	None of the above	1,367	0.73	−
Majority		23,232	12.48	
Turnout		186017	80.62	
BJD hold				

=== 2014 ===
In 2014 election, Biju Janata Dal candidate Susanta Singh defeated Independent candidate Sushant Mishra by a margin of 37,581 votes.

2014 Odisha Vidhan Sabha Election: Bhatli
Party	Candidate	Votes	%	±%
BJD	Susanta Singh	75,077	44.62	▲2.04
Independent	Sushant Mishra	37,496	22.29	−
BJP	Sauri Charan Barik	29,316	17.42	▲5.4
INC	Prakash Chandra Debta	10,506	6.24	▼32.98
NOTA	None of the above	1046	0.62	−
Majority		37,581	22.33	
Turnout		1,68,251	81.44	
Registered electors		206,590		
BJD hold				

=== 2009 ===
In 2009 election, Biju Janata Dal Susanta Singh candidate defeated Indian National Congress candidate Prakash Chandra Debata by 4,771 votes.

2009 Odisha Vidhan Sabha Election: Bhatli
Party	Candidate	Votes	%	±%
BJD	Susanta Singh	60,502	42.58	−
INC	Prakash Chandra Debata	55,725	39.22	−
BJP	Bimbadhar Kuanr	17,075	12.02	−
Majority		4,771	3.36 (Note: %of total valid votes)	
Turnout		1,42,114	74.11	
BJD gain from BJP				
