= Kulamani Samal =

Indian Politician

Dr. Kulamani Samal
- Dr. Kulamani Samal

Member: 16th Lok Sabha

Member of the Parliament
- In office 2014–2019
- Preceded by: Bibhu Prasad Tarai
- Succeeded by: Rajashree Mallick
- Constituency: Jagatsinghpur

Personal details
- Born: 10 February 1949 (age 77) Mangarajpur, Jagatsinghpur, Odisha
- Party: Biju Janata Dal
- Spouse: Smt. Latika Samal (51 years)
- Children: 2 Sons, 1 Daughter
- Parents: Father : † Shri Kanhu Charan Samal; Mother : † Smt. Maki Samal
- Profession: Medical practitioner; Social worker; Politician

Kulamani Samal is an Indian politician and professionally a Medical Practitioner and Social Worker. He educated M.B.B.S. at S.C.B. Medical College, Cuttack (Odisha). He is elected to the 16th Lok Sabha in 2014 from Jagatsinghpur constituency in Odisha. He is a member of the Biju Janata Dal (BJD) political party.

Remarkably, he was one of the only six members of the Lok Sabha to have secured a 100% Attendance in the 2014-2019 Political Session. Dr. Samal has no criminal record in his name, considering the fact that Roughly 1 in every 2 MPs (about 46%, or 251 out of 543 members) have declared criminal cases against them, according to the Association for Democratic Reforms (ADR) analysis of the latest Lok Sabha.

== Personal Life ==
Dr. Kulamani Samal was born on 10 February 1949 in Mangarajpur, Jagatsinghpur district, Odisha, to Kanhu Charan Samal and Maki Samal. He completed his M.B.B.S. medical degree at S.C.B. Medical College in Cuttack, Odisha.

On 13 July 1975, he married Latika Samal. They have three children (two sons and one daughter). Professionally, he worked as a medical practitioner and social worker before entering full-time electoral politics. Now, he works as veteran medical practitioner at his clinic, at his residence at Jagatsinghpur and spends his days with his patients.

== Work and Contribution ==
Dr. Samal has participated in 252 debates and asked 147 questions regarding national infrastructure, environment, pollution, and the railway network. He has served on critical policy-shaping groups, including the Parliamentary Standing Committee on Chemicals and Fertilizers and the Consultative Committee for the Ministry of Road Transport and Highways and Shipping. He has also been a Member of Parliamant Local Area Development Schemes (MPLADS).

He also served as a trustee for the Paradip Port Trust between 2012 and 2014 to oversee local industrial and welfare developments.

== See also ==
- Indian General Election, 2014 (Odisha)
- Paradip Port (also known as 'Paradeep Port') / Paradip Port Trust
- SCB Medical College
- MPLADS
