= Bijepur Assembly constituency =

Constituency of the Odisha legislative assembly in India

Coordinates: 21.19°N 83.45°E

Bijepur
- Constituency No. 2 for the Odisha Legislative Assembly

Constituency details
- Country: India
- Region: East India
- State: Odisha
- Division: Northern Division
- District: Bargarh
- Lok Sabha constituency: Bargarh
- Established: 1961
- Total electors: 2,41,753 (Note: as on 2024) (Note: as data published by election commission)
- Reservation: None

Member of Legislative Assembly
- 17th Odisha Legislative Assembly
- Incumbent Sanat Kumar Gartia
- Party: Bharatiya Janata Party
- Elected year: 2024

Bijepur is an Assembly constituency of Bargarh district in Odisha State. It was established in 1961.

== Extent of Assembly Constituencies ==
- Gaisilet Block
- Bijepur Block
- Barpali Block : Patkulunda, Remta, Bandhpali, Khemesara, Kainsir, Satalma, Barguda, Mahada, Tileimal, Agalpur, Bhatigaon, Raxa, Gopeipali, Tinkani, Tulundi and Kumbhari GPs
- Barpali NAC.

== Elected members ==
Vote share of winning candidates
2024	47.52%
2019 (bypoll)	73.86%
2019	59.78%
2018 (bypoll)	56.61%
2014	32.15%
2009	40.91%
2004	53.97%
2000	53.99%
1995	35.33%
1991 (bypoll)	56.53%
1990	63.54%
1985	58.46%
1980	48.71%
1977	63.37%

Since its formation in 1961,18 elections were held during including 3 By-Elections in 1991, 2018 and 2019.

List of members elected from Bijepur Constituency are:

Year	Member	Party
2024	Sanat Kumar Gartia	Bharatiya Janata Party
2019 (bypoll) (Note: Resignation of Naveen Patnaik)	Rita Sahu	Biju Janata Dal
2019	Naveen Patnaik	Biju Janata Dal
2018 (bypoll) (Note: Death of Subal Sahu)	Rita Sahu	Biju Janata Dal
2014	Subal Sahu	Indian National Congress
2009	Subal Sahu	Indian National Congress
2004	Subal Sahu	Indian National Congress
2000	Ashok Kumar Panigrahy	Biju Janata Dal
1995	Ripunath Seth	Indian National Congress
1991 (bypoll) (Note: Death of Nikunja Bihari Singh)	Kishorimani Singh	Janata Dal
1990	Nikunja Bihari Singh	Janata Dal
1985	Nikunja Bihari Singh	Janata Party
1980	Rajib Lochan Hota	Indian National Congress (I)
1977	Nityananda Gartia	Janata Party
1974	Gananath Pradhan	Utkal Congress
1971	Tribikram Malik	Indian National Congress (R)
1967	Mohan Nag	Indian National Congress
1961	Mohan Nag	Indian National Congress

== Election results ==
=== 2024 ===
Voting were held on 20 May 2024 in 2nd phase of Odisha Assembly Election & 5th phase of Indian General Election. Counting of votes was on 4 June 2024. In 2024 election, Bharatiya Janata Party candidate Sanat Kumar Gartia defeated Biju Janata Dal candidate Rita Sahu by a margin of 10,066 votes.

2024 Odisha Vidhan Sabha Election: Bijepur
Party	Candidate	Votes	%	±%
BJP	Sanat Kumar Gartia	93,161	47.52	
BJD	Rita Sahu	83,095	42.39	
INC	Kishor Dafadar	15,707	8.01	
NOTA	None of the above	2055	1.05	
Majority		10,066	5.13	
Turnout		1,96,028	81.09	
BJP gain from BJD				

=== 2019 Bypoll ===
In 2019 By-Election, Biju Janata Dal candidate Rita Sahu defeated Bharatiya Janata Party candidate Sanat Kumar Gartia by a margin of 97,990 votes.

2019 By-election: Bijepur
Party	Candidate	Votes	%	±%
BJD	Rita Sahu	135,957	73.86	▲14.08
BJP	Sanat Kumar Gartia	37,967	20.62	▼8.29
INC	Dillip Kumar Panda	5,873	3.20	▼4.55
NOTA	None of the above	1,982	1.07	0.16
Majority		97,990	53.23	
Turnout		1,84,059	79.32	
BJD hold				

=== 2019 ===
In 2019 election, Biju Janata Dal candidate Naveen Patnaik defeated Bharatiya Janata Party candidate Sanat Kumar Gartia by a margin of 57,122 votes. Later, Naveen Patnaik has resigned as MLA from the Bijepur Assembly Constituency.

2019 Odisha Vidhan Sabha Election: Bijepur
Party	Candidate	Votes	%	±%
BJD	Naveen Patnaik	110,604	59.78	▲27.90
BJP	Sanat Kumar Gartia	53,482	28.91	▲10.81
INC	Ripunath Seth	14,344	7.75	▼24.4
NOTA	None of the above	1,675	0.91	−
Majority		57,122	30.87	
Turnout		1,85,024	79.69	
BJD hold				

=== 2018 Bypoll ===
In 2018 By-Election, Biju Janata Dal candidate Rita Sahu defeated Bharatiya Janata Party candidate Ashok Kumar Panigrahy by a margin of 41,932 votes.

2018 By-election: Bijepur
Party	Candidate	Votes	%	±%
BJD	Rita Sahu	102,871	56.61	▲24.73
BJP	Ashok Kumar Panigrahy	60,939	33.54	▲15.53
INC	Pranaya Kumar Sahu	10274	5.65	▼26.5
NOTA	None of the above	1684	0.93	
Majority		41,932	23.1	
Turnout		1,81,716	82.17	
BJD gain from INC		Swing	24.46	

=== 2014 ===
In 2014 election, Indian National Congress candidate Subal Sahu defeated Biju Janata Dal candidate Prasanna Acharya by a margin of 458 votes.

2014 Odisha Vidhan Sabha Election: Bijepur
Party	Candidate	Votes	%	±%
INC	Subal Sahu	53,290	32.15	▼8.76
BJD	Prasanna Acharya	52,832	31.88	▼2.57
BJP	Jayshankar Pattanaik	30,001	18.1	▲4.08
Independent	Ashok Kumar Panigrahi	18,232	11.0	−
NOTA	None of the above	1,285	0.78	−
Majority		458	0.28	6.17
Turnout		1,65,747	80.29	10.06
Registered electors		2,06,436		
INC hold				

=== 2009 ===
In 2009 election, Indian National Congress candidate Subal Sahu defeated Biju Janata Dal candidate Prabhat Aditya Mishra by 18,066 votes.

2009 Odisha Vidhan Sabha Election: Bijepur
Party	Candidate	Votes	%	±%
INC	Subal Sahu	56,864	40.91	−
BJD	Prabhat Aditya Mishra	47,893	34.45	−
BJP	Mohammad Rafique	19,493	14.02	−
Majority		8,971	6.45	
Turnout		1,39,018	70.23	
INC hold				
