= Brajarajnagar Assembly constituency =

Constituency of the Odisha legislative assembly in India

Coordinates: 21.84°N 83.92°E

Brajarajnagar
- Constituency No. 6 for the Odisha Legislative Assembly

Constituency details
- Country: India
- Region: East India
- State: Odisha
- Division: Northern Division
- District: Jharsuguda
- Lok Sabha constituency: Bargarh
- Established: 1961
- Total electors: 2,17,251 (Note: as on 2024) (Note: as data published by election commission)
- Reservation: None

Member of Legislative Assembly
- 17th Odisha Legislative Assembly
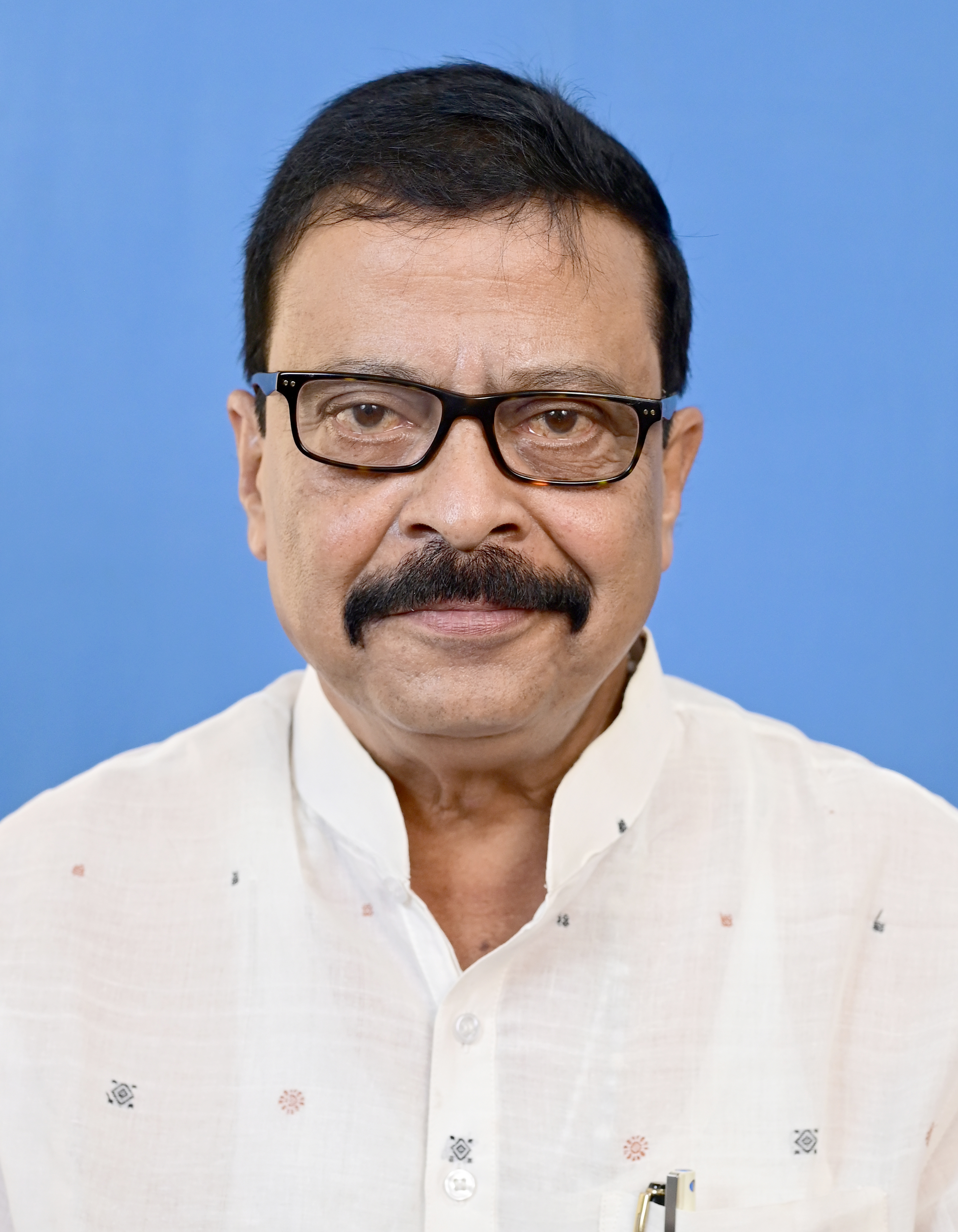
- Incumbent Suresh Pujari
- Party: Bharatiya Janata Party
- Elected year: 2024

Brajarajnagar is an Assembly constituency of Jharsuguda district, in Odisha State. It was established in 1961.

== Extent of Assembly Constituencies ==
- Lakhanpur Block
- Jharsuguda Block: Chandnimal, Gourmal, Loisingh, Rajpur and Kudopali GPs
- Belpahar NAC
- Brajarajnagar Municipality

== Elected members ==
Vote share of winning candidates
2024	48.85%
2022 (bypoll)	61.25%
2019	48.7%
2014	37.34%
2009	43.46%
2004	39.13%
2000	40.81%
1998 (bypoll)	31.22%
1995	32.40%
1990	60.76%
1985	50.65%
1980	54.60%
1977	32.64%

Since its formation in 1961, 16 elections were held till date including two bypolls in 1998 & 2022.

List of members elected from Brajarajnagar constituency are:

Year	Member	Party
2024	Suresh Pujari	Bharatiya Janata Party
2022 (bypoll) (Note: Death of Kishore Kumar Mohanty)	Alka Mohanty	Biju Janata Dal
2019	Kishore Kumar Mohanty	Biju Janata Dal
2014	Radharani Panda	Bharatiya Janata Party
2009	Anup Kumar Sai	Indian National Congress
2004	Anup Kumar Sai	Indian National Congress
2000	Anup Kumar Sai	Indian National Congress
1998 (bypoll) (Note: Death of Prasanna Kumar Panda)	Keshab Sahoo	Indian National Congress
1995	Prasanna Kumar Panda	Communist Party of India
1990	Prasanna Kumar Panda	Communist Party of India
1985	Prasanna Kumar Panda	Communist Party of India
1980	Upendra Dikshit	Indian National Congress (I)
1977	Upendra Dikshit	Indian National Congress
1974	Prasanna Kumar Panda	Communist Party of India
1971	Upendra Dikshit	Indian National Congress (R)
1967	Prasanna Kumar Panda	Communist Party of India
1961	Prasanna Kumar Panda	Communist Party of India

== Election results ==
=== 2024 ===
Voting was held on 20 May 2024 in 2nd phase of Odisha Assembly Election & 5th phase of Indian General Election. Counting of votes was on 4 June 2024. In 2024 election, Bharatiya Janata Party candidate Suresh Pujari defeated Biju Janata Dal candidate Alka Mohanty by a margin of 26,789 votes.

2024 Odisha Vidhan Sabha Election, Brajarajnagar
Party	Candidate	Votes	%	±%
BJP	Suresh Pujari	82,199	48.85	
BJD	Alka Mohanty	55,410	32.93	
INC	Kishore Chandra Patel	21,809	12.96	
NOTA	None of the above	1384	0.82	
Majority		26,789	15.92	
Turnout		1,68,268	77.45	
BJP gain from BJD				

=== 2022 Bypoll ===
In 2022 bye-election, Biju Janata Dal candidate Alka Mohanty defeated Indian National Congress candidate Kishore Chandra Patel by 66,122 votes.

2022 By-election: Brajarajnagar
Party	Candidate	Votes	%	±%
BJD	Alka Mohanty	93,953	61.25	▲12.55
INC	Kishore Chandra Patel	27,831	18.14	
BJP	Radharani Panda	22,630	14.75	▼26.88
CPI	Ramesh Kumar Tripathy	3,105	2.02	▼3.66
Independent	Aditya Padhan	1,884	1.23	−
None of the Above	None of the Above	4,000 (Note: Non of the Above+rest of the above)	2.60	
Majority		66,122	43.11	
Turnout		1,54,048	71.62	
BJD hold				

=== 2019 ===
In 2019 election, Biju Janata Dal candidate Kishore Kumar Mohanty defeated Bharatiya Janata Party candidate Radharani Panda by 11,634 votes.

2019 Odisha Vidhan Sabha Election: Brajarajnagar
Party	Candidate	Votes	%	±%
BJD	Kishore Kumar Mohanty	80,152	48.7	▲23.25
BJP	Radharani Panda	68,153	41.63	▲14.79
CPI	Ramesh Tripathi	9,350	5.68	▲2.28
NOTA	None of the above	1,429	0.87	−
Majority		11634	7.05	
Turnout		164587	77.9	
BJD gain from BJP				

=== 2014 ===
In 2014 election, Bharatiya Janata Party candidate Radharani Panda defeated Biju Janata Dal candidate Anup Kumar Sai by 6,790 votes.

2014 Odisha Vidhan Sabha Election: Brajarajnagar
Party	Candidate	Votes	%	±%
BJP	Radharani Panda	50,736	26.84	▼15.12
BJD	Anup Kumar Sai	43,946	23.25	−
INC	Kishore Chandra Patel	38,175	20.19	▼23.27
CPI	Gajanan Sahu	6,436	3.40	▼3.4
NOTA	None of the above	1,635	0.86	−
Majority		6,790	3.59	
Turnout		145851	76.52	
Registered electors		1,89,012		
BJP gain from INC				

=== 2009 ===
In 2009 election, Indian National Congress candidate Anup Kumar Sai defeated Bharatiya Janata Party candidate Suresh Pujari by 1,742 votes.

2009 Odisha Vidhan Sabha Election: Brajarajnagar
Party	Candidate	Votes	%	±%
INC	Anup Kumar Sai	50,585	43.46	−
BJP	Suresh Pujari	48,843	41.96	−
CPI	Ramsahay Panda	7,911	6.80	−
Majority		1,742	1.50 (Note: %of total valid votes)	
Turnout		1,16,402	63.62	
INC hold				
