= Lingaraj (social activist) =

Indian politician

- Born: 31 December 1961 (age 64); Kandadhuda, Sundargarh
- Education: M. A. in Sociology,(JNU, Delhi)
- Occupations: Social Service, Environmental Activist
- Years active: 30
- Employer: The Human Society
- Organization(s): Niyamgiri Surakhya Samiti, Samajwadi Jan Parishad Odisha Rajya Krushak Sangathan
- Known for: Fight for the environment and tribals of Niyamgiri Mountains, Kalahandi, Kashipur, Gandhamardan in Orissa
- Notable work: Farmers' Movement of Western Odisha, Save Gandhamardan Movement, Occupy Hirakud Movement
- Political party: Samajwadi Jan Parishad, Samta Bhawan
- Movement: Save Gandhamardan Movement, Farmers Rights Movement, Kashipur Anti-mining Movement, "Save Niyamgiri" anti-mining Movement
- Spouse: Archana Patra

Lingaraj (Lingaraj Pradhan) is a social activist, politician, socialist thinker working from Bargarh district in Western Odisha, involved in various social, environmental and farmers' issues.

Prior to joining AAP, he was long time associated with Samajwadi Jan Parishad, a political party founded by Kishen Pattanayak. He left AAP in 2015 after AAP expelled Yogendra yadav and other leader

Lingaraj does not use his surname Pradhan as he opposes caste based identity and decided to do away with honorary titles.

== Activism ==
=== Farmers' movements ===
He is now one of the convenors of "Paschim Odisha Krushak Samanwayan Samiti" (Western Odisha Farmers Coordination Committee).

=== Physical attacks ===
1997 he along with Lingaraj Azad were again attacked by company goons for his participation in the anti-mining movement in Kashipur.

== Political career ==
His active political career began in the year 2004 when he contested from Bargarh Assembly constituency and remained in second position by securing over 22,000 votes under the banner of Samajwadi Jan Parishad with support of Odisha Rajya Krushak Sangathan.

In 2009, he again contested from the same place, again finishing in third place.

He is contesting the 2014 Lok Sabha elections as a candidate from Bargarh (Lok Sabha constituency).
