= Suresh Pujari =

Minister of Revenue and Disaster Management of Odisha

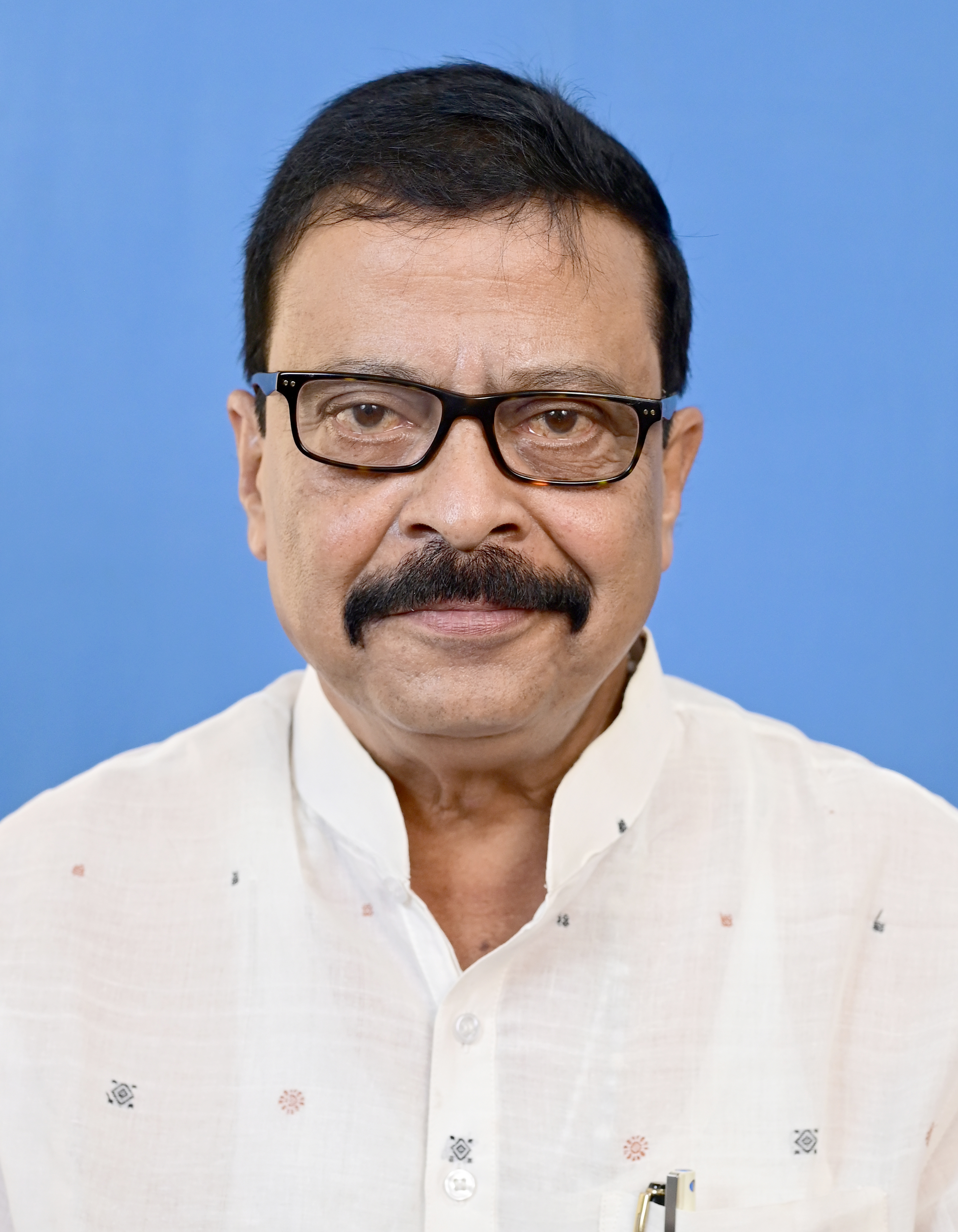

Minister of Revenue & Disaster Management Government of Odisha
- Incumbent
- Assumed office 12 June 2024
- Chief Minister: Mohan Charan Majhi
- Preceded by: Sudam Marndi

Member of the Odisha Legislative Assembly
- Incumbent
- Assumed office 12 June 2024
- Preceded by: Alka Mohanty
- Constituency: Brajarajnagar

Member of Parliament, Lok Sabha
- In office 23 May 2019 – 4 June 2024
- Preceded by: Prabhas Kumar Singh
- Succeeded by: Pradip Purohit
- Constituency: Bargarh

President of Bharatiya Janata Party, Odisha
- In office 7 November 2006 – 22 December 2009
- Preceded by: Jual Oram
- Succeeded by: Jual Oram

Personal details
- Born: 29 July 1960 (age 65) Sambalpur, Odisha, India
- Party: Bharatiya Janata Party
- Spouse: Padmini Nayak (m. 1987)
- Children: 2 sons
- Education: Master of Science (Physics); Bachelor of Laws; Postgraduate diploma in Labour Law & Personnel Management
- Alma mater: Gangadhar Meher University; Lajpat Rai Law College; Sambalpur University
- Profession: Advocate, Politician

Suresh Kumar Pujari (born 29 July 1960) is an Indian politician serving as the Minister of Revenue and Disaster Management in the Government of Odisha since June 2024. He is a Member of the Odisha Legislative Assembly representing the Brajarajnagar constituency. A member of the Bharatiya Janata Party (BJP), he previously served as a Member of Parliament, Lok Sabha from Bargarh between 2019 and 2024.

Pujari has also served as a national secretary for the Bharatiya Janata Party and represented the state of Odisha in the central committee of the BJP under the national presidency of Amit Shah.

== Early life and education ==
Suresh Pujari was born on July 29, 1960, in Sambalpur, Odisha. He holds an M.Sc. in physics, an L.L.B., and a postgraduate diploma in Labour Law and Personal Management from colleges affiliated with Sambalpur University. He married Padmini Nayak on February 7, 1987, and has two sons. His wife is a retired Additional Block Education Officer.
