= Ministry of Revenue and Disaster Management (Odisha) =

Odisha government ministry responsible for Revenue

Revenue & Disaster Management Government of Odisha
- ରାଜସ୍ୱ ଓ ବିପର୍ଯ୍ୟୟ ପରିଚାଳନା ବିଭାଗ
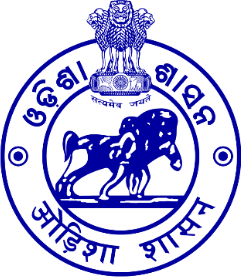

Agency overview
- Formed: 1936; 90 years ago
- Preceding agency: Department of Revenue
- Jurisdiction: Chief Minister of Odisha
- Headquarters: Bhubaneswar
- Annual budget: State budget of Government of Odisha
- Minister responsible: Suresh Pujari, Cabinet Minister
- Agency executives: Deoranjan Kumar Singh, Additional Chief Secretary
- Website: revenue.odisha.gov.in

The Ministry of Revenue and Disaster Management is a ministry of the Government of Odisha. It is responsible for preparing annual plans for the development of Odisha state. It also oversees the transfer of immovable properties, administration of the registration offices and overseeing the agencies responsible for providing relief to the people affected by various natural and man-made calamities .

The Ministry is headed by a Cabinet level by Suresh Pujari. The administration is headed by Principal Secretary or Additional Chief Secretary.
