= Kishore Kumar Mohanty =

Indian politician

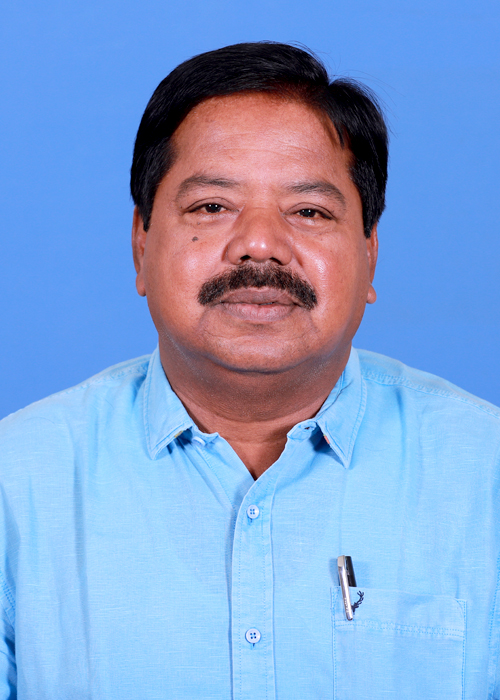

Member of Rajya Sabha
- In office 6 August 2009 – 3 April 2012 Serving with Parvez Hashmi
- Constituency: Odisha

Speaker and Member of Odisha Legislative Assembly
- In office 19 August 2008 – 25 May 2009
- Constituency: Jharsuguda Assembly constituency and Brajarajnagar Assembly constituency

Chairman of Western Odisha Development Council

Personal details
- Born: 4 December 1958
- Died: 30 December 2021 (aged 63)
- Spouse: Alaka Mohanty
- Children: 1 son and 1 daughter
- Parent: Golok Chandra Mohanty

Kishore Kumar Mohanty was an Indian politician and advocate who served as Member of Rajya Sabha from Odisha, Speaker and Member of Odisha Legislative Assembly from Jharsuguda Assembly constituency and Brajarajnagar Assembly constituency and Chairman of Western Odisha Development Council.

== Personal life ==
He was born on 4 December 1958 in a Karan family. He has done B.Com and LLB. He has one son and one daughter. On 30 December 2021, he died at the age of 63 due to a massive cardiac arrest while attending a meeting in Janta Dal United Office, Jharsuguda, after that he was rushed to a private hospital where he died. His wife Alka Mohanty succeeded him as Member of the Legislative Assembly. In 2019 Odisha Legislative Assembly election, he defeated Radharani Panda, former MLA by 80,152 votes with rate of 49% and margin of 11,634.

== Honors ==
- In his death, Naveen Patnaik, Chief Minister of Odisha said "He was an efficient and popular leader of the party"
- In July 2022, obituaries were also paid to him in the Parliament of India
