= Rajashree Mallick =

Indian politician (born 1964)

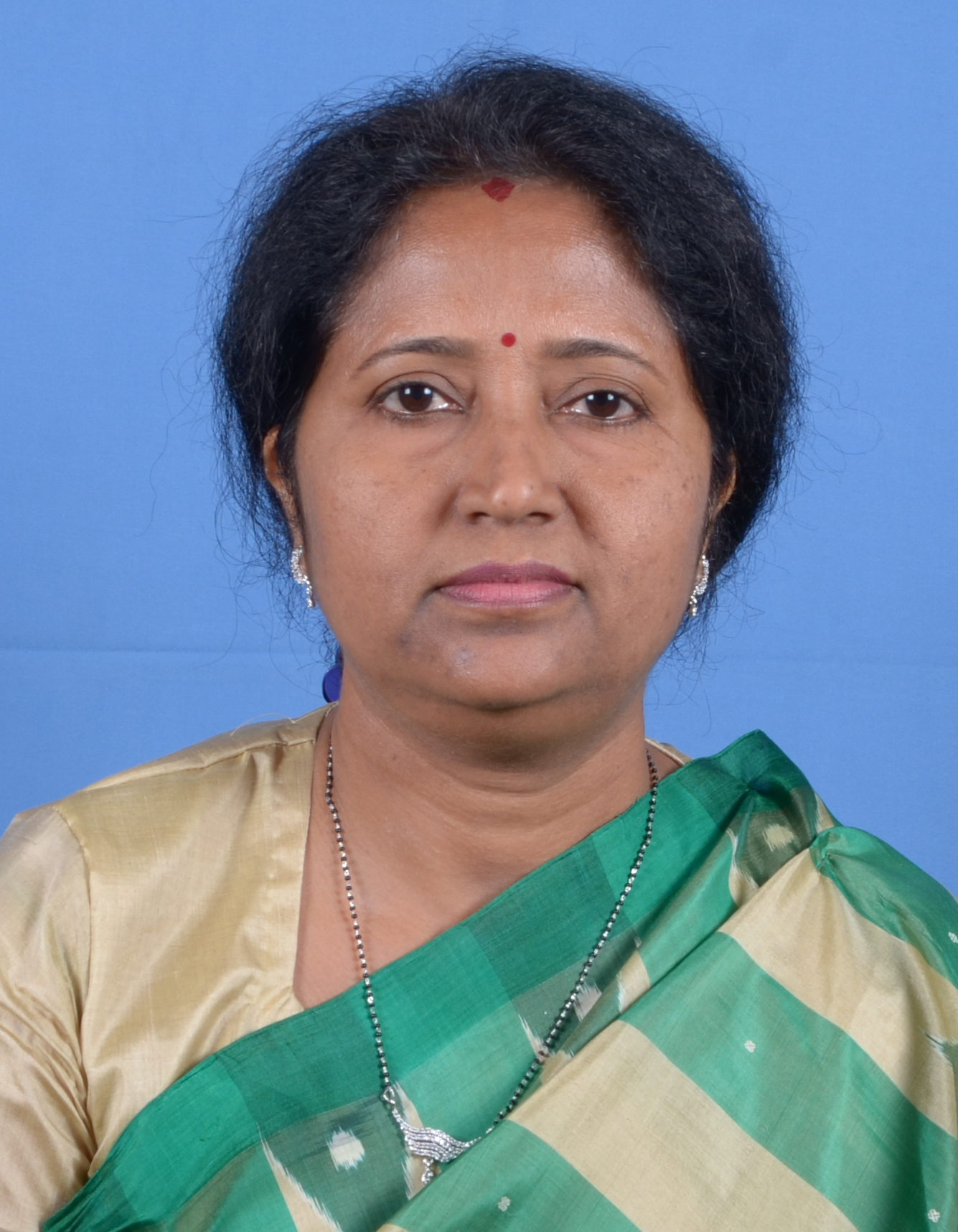

Member of Parliament, Lok Sabha
- In office 2019–2024
- Preceded by: Kulamani Samal
- Succeeded by: Bibhu Prasad Tarai
- Constituency: Jagatsinghpur, Odisha

Member of Odisha Legislative Assembly
- In office 2014-2019
- Preceded by: Rabindra Nath Bhoi
- Succeeded by: Bishnu Charan Das
- Constituency: Tirtol

Personal details
- Born: November 3, 1964 (age 61) Cuttack, Odisha
- Party: Biju Janata Dal
- Spouse: Ashutosh Mallick
- Children: 1 son and daughter
- Education: MBBS and MD MKCG Medical College and Hospital
- Profession: Doctor

Dr Rajashree Mallick (born 3 November 1964) is an Indian politician. She was elected to the Lok Sabha, lower house of the Parliament of India from Jagatsinghpur, Odisha in the 2019 Indian general election as a member of the Biju Janata Dal. She was earlier elected to the Legislative Assembly of Odisha from Tirtol in 2014.
