= Bibhu Prasad Tarai =

Member of the Lok Sabha

Dr Bibhuprasad Tarai
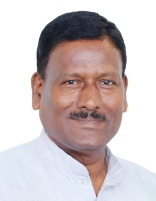
- Official Portrait

Member of Parliament, Lok Sabha
- Incumbent
- Assumed office 4 June 2024
- Preceded by: Rajashree Mallick
- In office 2009–2014
- Preceded by: Trilochan Kanungo
- Succeeded by: Kulamani Samal
- Constituency: Jagatsinghpur

Personal details
- Born: 17 June 1964 (age 62) Mangarajpur, Jagatsinghpur
- Citizenship: Indian
- Party: Bharatiya Janata Party (2019–present); Indian National Congress (2009-2014); Communist Party of India (up to 2009)
- Other political affiliations: Communist Party of India
- Spouse: Ranushree Tarai (m. 1999)
- Children: 2 (Snigdha Mohapatra, Sudeshna Mohapatra)
- Parent(s): Dinabandhu Tarai (father); Saraswati Tarai (mother)
- Occupation: Politician
- Website: https://www.facebook.com/Dr.BibhuPrasadTarai?mibextid=ZbWKwL

Dr Bibhu Prasad Tarai (born 17 June 1964) is an Indian politician and leader of Bharatiya Janata Party. He was a member of the Indian Parliament from Odisha in the 15th Loksabha. He represented Jagatsinghpur (Lok Sabha constituency).

== See also ==
- Jagatsinghpur (Lok Sabha constituency)
- Indian general election in Orissa, 2009
- Communist Party of India
