= Tirtol Assembly constituency =

Constituency of the Odisha legislative assembly in India

Coordinates: 20.31°N 86.34°E

Tirtol
- Constituency No. 102 for the Odisha Legislative Assembly
- Tirtol Assembly constituency in Jagatsinghpur district

Constituency details
- Country: India
- Region: East India
- State: Odisha
- Division: Central Division
- District: Jagatsinghpur
- Lok Sabha constituency: Jagatsinghpur
- Established: 1951
- Total electors: 2,49,910 (Note: as on 2024) (Note: as data published by election commission)
- Reservation: SC

Member of Legislative Assembly
- 17th Odisha Legislative Assembly
- Incumbent Ramakanta Bhoi
- Party: Biju Janata Dal
- Elected year: 2024

Tirtol is a Vidhan Sabha constituency of Jagatsinghpur district, Odisha.

This constituency includes Biridi block and Raghunathpur block and 20 Gram panchayats (Biritol, Bishunpur, Dainlo, Garam, Gobindapur, Gopalpur, Gopalpur (Sankheswar), Ibrisingh, Jagannathpur, Kanakpur, Kanimula, Katara, Kostimallikapur, Krushnanandpur, Mulisingh, Patilo, Sanara, Tarajanga, Tirtol and Tulanga) of Tirtol block.

== Elected members ==
Since its formation in 1951, 18 elections were held till date including one bypoll in 2020.

List of members elected from Tirtol constituency are:

Year	Member	Party
2024	Ramakanta Bhoi	Biju Janata Dal
2020 (bypoll) (Note: Death of Bishnu Charan Das)	Bijaya Shankar Das	Biju Janata Dal
2019	Bishnu Charan Das	Biju Janata Dal
2014	Rajashree Mallick	Biju Janata Dal
2009	Rabindranath Bhoi	Biju Janata Dal
2004	Chiranjib Biswal	Indian National Congress
2000	Debashish Samantaray	Biju Janata Dal
1995	Basant Kumar Biswal	Indian National Congress
1990	Basant Kumar Biswal	Indian National Congress
1985	Nityananda Samntaray	Indian National Congress
1980	Basant Kumar Biswal	Indian National Congress (I)
1977	Pratap Chandra Mohanty	Janata Party
1974	Pratap Chandra Mohanty	Utkal Congress
1971	Pratap Chandra Mohanty	Utkal Congress
1967	Nishamani Khuntia	Praja Socialist Party
1961	Pratap Chandra Mohanty	Indian National Congress
1957	Nishamani Khuntia	Praja Socialist Party
1951	Nishamani Khuntia	Socialist Party

== Election results ==
Vote share of winning candidates
2024	45.48%
2020 (bypoll)	52.91%
2019	54.18%
2014	55.20%
2009	50.64%
2004	50.50%
2000	51.20%
1995	58.31%
1990	50.30%
1985	71.38%
1980	52.87%
1977	67.05%

=== 2024 ===
Voting were held on 1 June 2024 in 4th phase of Odisha Assembly Election & 7th phase of Indian General Election. Counting of votes was on 4 June 2024. In 2024 election,Biju Janata Dal candidate Ramakanta Bhoi defeated Bharatiya Janata Party candidate Rajkishore Behera by a margin of 28,495 votes.

2024 Odisha Vidhan Sabha Election, Tirtol
Party	Candidate	Votes	%	±%
BJD	Ramakanta Bhoi	83,740	42.91	▼7.43
BJP	Rajkishore Behera	55,245	28.18	▲2.09
INC	Himanshu Bhusan Mallick	52,852	27.25	▲10.03
NOTA	None of the above	649	0.35	▼0.08
Majority		28,495	15.48	▼9.51
Turnout		1,94,113	73.67	▲2.73
BJD hold				

=== 2020 Bypoll ===
In 2020 bye-election, Biju Janata Dal candidate Bijaya Shankar Das defeated Bharatiya Janata Party candidate Rajkishore Behera by 41,703 votes.

2020 Odisha Legislative Assembly by-election: Tirtol
Party	Candidate	Votes	%	±%
BJD	Bijaya Shankar Das	88,310	52.91	▼2.27
BJP	Rajkishore Behera	46,607	27.92	▼2.98
INC	Himanshu Bhusan Mallick	28,778	17.24	▲3.51
NOTA	None of the above	700	0.43	
Majority		41,703	24.99	
Turnout		1,68,603	70.93	
BJD hold				

=== 2019 ===
In 2019 election, Biju Janata Dal candidate Bishnu Charan Das defeated Bharatiya Janata Party candidate Ramakanta Bhoi by 40,386 votes.

2019 Odisha Vidhan Sabha Election, Tirtol
Party	Candidate	Votes	%	±%
BJD	Bishnu Charan Das	93,967	54.18	
BJP	Ramakanta Bhoi	53,581	30.90	
INC	Debi Prasad Mallick	23,809	13.73	
NOTA	None of the above	1,109	0.66	
Majority		40,386	23.28	
Turnout		1,73,423	73	
BJD hold				

=== 2014 ===
In 2014 election, Biju Janata Dal candidate Rajashree Mallick defeated Indian National Congress candidate Rajkishore Behera by a margin of 35,448 votes.

2014 Odisha Vidhan Sabha Election, Tirtol
Party	Candidate	Votes	%	±%
BJD	Rajashree Mallick	88,953	55.2	▲4.56
INC	Rajkishore Behera	53,505	33.21	▼1.12
BJP	Ramakanta Bhoi	14,516	9.01	▲5.79
NOTA	None of the above	1,203	0.75	−
Majority		35,448	21.99	▼2.41
Turnout		1,61,135	75.48	9.37
Registered electors		2,13,483		
BJD hold				

=== 2009 ===
In 2009 election, Biju Janata Dal candidate Rabindra Nath Bhoi defeated Indian National Congress candidate Rajkishore Das by a margin of 34,182 votes.

2009 Odisha Vidhan Sabha Election, Tirtol
Party	Candidate	Votes	%	±%
BJD	Rabindra Nath Bhoi	82,282	50.64	▲5.07
INC	Rajkishore Behera	48,100	34.33	▼16.17
BJP	Latamani Das	4,514	3.22	−
Majority		34,182	24.40 (Note: % of total valid votes)	−
Turnout		1,40,137	66.11	▼6.47
Registered electors		2,11,982		
BJD gain from INC				
