= Sanat Kumar Gartia =

Indian politician

Member of Odisha Legislative Assembly
- Incumbent
- Assumed office 4 June 2024
- Preceded by: Rita Sahu
- Constituency: Bijepur

Personal details
- Party: Bharatiya Janata Party
- Profession: Politician

Sanat Kumar Gartia is an Indian politician from Odisha. He is a Member of the Odisha Legislative Assembly from 2024, representing Bijepur Assembly constituency as a Member of the Bharatiya Janata Party.

== See also ==
- 2024 Odisha Legislative Assembly election
- Odisha Legislative Assembly
