= Trilochan Kanungo =

Indian politician (1940–2023)

Member of Parliament, Lok Sabha
- In office 1999–2004
- Preceded by: Ranjib Biswal
- Succeeded by: Brahmananda Panda
- Constituency: Jagatsinghpur, Odisha

Personal details
- Born: 24 November 1940 Badamulei, Cuttack district, Orissa Province, British India
- Died: 21 April 2023 (aged 82) Bhubaneswar, Odisha, India
- Party: Biju Janata Dal
- Other political affiliations: Janata Dal
- Spouse: Augustee Kanungo

Trilochan Kanungo (Odia: ତ୍ରିଲୋଚନ କାନୁନଗୋ; 24 November 1940 – 21 April 2023) was an Indian politician. He was elected to the Lok Sabha, the lower house of the Parliament of India as a member of the Biju Janata Dal. He was the founder of Udayanath Autonomous College at Adaspur, Cuttack.

Kanungo died on 21 April 2023, at the age of 82.
