= Bijaya Kumar Nayak =

Indian lawyer and politician (1951–2020)

Member of the Odisha Legislative Assembly
- In office 1995–2000
- Preceded by: Damodar Rout
- Succeeded by: Damodar Rout
- Constituency: Ersama

Personal details
- Born: 4 August 1951
- Died: 26 February 2020 (aged 68)
- Political party: Indian National Congress

Bijaya Kumar Nayak (4 August 1951 – 26 February 2020) was an Indian lawyer and politician from Odisha belonging to Indian National Congress. He was a legislator of the Odisha Legislative Assembly.

== Biography ==
Nayak was born on 4 August 1951. He was elected as a member of the Odisha Legislative Assembly from Ersama in 1995.

Nayak died on 26 February 2020 at the age of 68.
