= Padampur Assembly constituency =

Constituency in Odisha, India

Coordinates: 21.00°N 83.06°E

Padampur
- Constituency No. 1 for the Odisha Legislative Assembly
- Padampur Assembly constituency in Bargarh district

Constituency details
- Country: India
- Region: East India
- State: Odisha
- Division: Northern Division
- District: Bargarh
- Lok Sabha constituency: Bargarh
- Established: 1951
- Total electors: 2,70,450 (Note: as on 2024) (Note: as data published by election commission)
- Reservation: None

Member of Legislative Assembly
- 17th Odisha Legislative Assembly
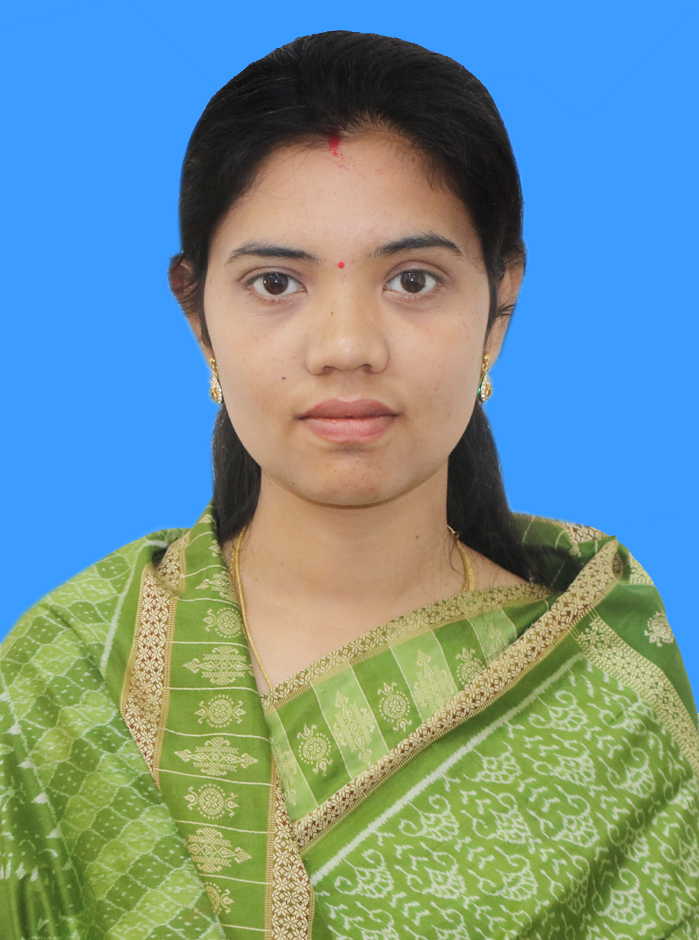
- Incumbent Barsha Singh Bariha
- Party: Biju Janata Dal
- Elected year: 2024

Padampur is an Assembly constituency of Bargarh district in Odisha State. It was established in 1951.

== Extent of Assembly Constituencies ==
- Jharbandh Block
- Paikmal Block
- Rajborasmbar Block
- Padampur NAC.

== Elected members ==
Vote share of winning candidates
2024	43.53%
2022 (bypoll)	58%
2019	41.29%
2014	38.94%
2009	44.15%
2004	51.27%
2000	48.41%
1995	52.51%
1990	65.71%
1985	64.49%
1980	42.58%
1977	63.58%

Since its formation in 1951, 19 elections were held till date including 2 bypolls in 1952 & 2022. It was a 2-member constituency in 1952 & 1957.

List of members elected from Padampur constituency are:

Year	Member	Party
2024	Barsha Singh Bariha	Biju Janata Dal
2022 (bypoll) (Note: Death of Bijaya Ranjan Singh Bariha)	Barsha Singh Bariha	Biju Janata Dal
2019	Bijaya Ranjan Singh Bariha	Biju Janata Dal
2014	Pradip Purohit	Bharatiya Janata Party
2009	Bijaya Ranjan Singh Bariha	Biju Janata Dal
2004	Satyabhusan Sahu	Indian National Congress
2000	Bijaya Ranjan Singh Bariha	Biju Janata Dal
1995	Bijaya Ranjan Singh Bariha	Janata Dal
1990	Bijaya Ranjan Singh Bariha	Janata Dal
1985	Satyabhusan Sahu	Indian National Congress
1980	Satyabhusan Sahu	Indian National Congress (I)
1977	Bikramaditya Singh Bariha	Janata Party
1974	Krupasindhu Bhoi	Indian National Congress
1971	Krupasindhu Bhoi	Indian National Congress (R)
1967	Bikramaditya Singh Bariha	Orissa Jana Congress
1961	Bikramaditya Singh Bariha	Indian National Congress
1957 (Note: It was a 2 member constituency)	Bikramaditya Singh Bariha	Indian National Congress
1957	L. M. S. Bariha	Ganatantra Parishad
1952 (Bypoll) (Note: Death of Lal Ranjit Singh Bariha)	Bikramaditya Singh Bariha	Indian National Congress
1952 (Note: It was a 2 member constituency)	Aniruddha Mishra	Independent politician
1952	Lal Ranjit Singh Bariha	Indian National Congress

== Election results ==
=== 2024 ===
Voting were held on 20 May 2024 in 2nd phase of Odisha Assembly Election & 5th phase of Indian General Election. Counting of votes was on 4 June 2024. In 2024 election, Biju Janata Dal candidate Barsha Singh Bariha defeated Bharatiya Janata Party candidate Gobardhan Bhoy by a margin of 10,993 votes.

2024 Odisha Vidhan Sabha Election: Padampur
Party	Candidate	Votes	%	±%
BJD	Barsha Singh Bariha	91,995	48.53	▼9.47
BJP	Gobardhan Bhoy	81,002	38.33	▲0.82
INC	Tankadhar Sahu	30,453	14.41	▲12.68
NOTA	None of the above	1,617	0.77	▼0.23
Majority		10,993	10.20	
Turnout		2,11,320	75.12	
BJD hold				

=== 2022 Bypoll ===
In the 2022 by-election, Biju Janata Dal candidate Barsha Singh Bariha defeated Bharatiya Janata Party candidate Pradip Purohit by a margin of 42,679 votes.

2022 Odisha Vidhan Sabha by-election: Padampur
Party	Candidate	Votes	%	±%
BJD	Barsha Singh Bariha	120,807	58.0	▲20.49
BJP	Pradip Purohit	78,128	37.51	▼0.94
INC	Satyabhusan Sahu	3,594	1.73	▼14.52
NOTA	None of the above	2,087	1.0	▼0.11
Majority		42,679	20.49	▲17.65
Turnout		2,08,303		
BJD hold				

=== 2019 ===
In 2019 election, Biju Janata Dal candidate Bijaya Ranjan Singh Bariha defeated Bharatiya Janata Party candidate Pradip Purohit by a margin of 5,734 votes.

2019 Odisha Vidhan Sabha Election: Padampur
Party	Candidate	Votes	%	±%
BJD	Bijaya Ranjan Singh Bariha	83,299	41.29	▲4.90
BJP	Pradip Purohit	77565	38.45	▼0.49
INC	Sataya Bhusan Sahu	32787	16.25	▼1.36
NOTA	None of the above	2234	1.11	−
Majority		5734	2.84	
Turnout		2,01,729	79.16	
BJD gain from BJP				

=== 2014 ===
In 2014 election, Bharatiya Janata Party candidate Pradip Purohit defeated Biju Janata Dal candidate Bijaya Ranjan Singh Bariha by a margin of 4,513 votes.

2014 Odisha Vidhan Sabha Election: Padampur
Party	Candidate	Votes	%	±%
BJP	Pradip Purohit	68,942	38.94	▲19.66
BJD	Bijaya Ranjan Singh Bariha	64,429	36.39	▼7.76
INC	Prakash Narayan Tripathy	31,179	17.61	▼14.8
NOTA	None of the above	1,751	0.99	−
Majority		4,513	2.55	
Turnout		1,77,037	79.16	3.65
Registered electors		2,23,649		
BJP gain from BJD				

=== 2009 ===
In 2009 election, Biju Janata Dal candidate Bijaya Ranjan Singh Bariha defeated Indian National Congress candidate Satyabhusan Sahu by 18,066 votes.

2009 Odisha Vidhan Sabha Election: Padampur
Party	Candidate	Votes	%	±%
BJD	Bijaya Ranjan Singh Bariha	67,913	44.15	▼4.58
INC	Satyabhusan Sahu	49,847	32.41	▼18.86
BJP	Pradip Purohit	29,651	19.28	−
Majority		18,066	11.75	−
Turnout		1,53,837	75.51	
BJD gain from INC		Swing	1.42 (Note: 2004 Voter turnout was 74.09%)	
