= Tankadhar Tripathy =

Indian politician

Member of Odisha Legislative Assembly
- Incumbent
- Assumed office 4 June 2024
- Preceded by: Dipali Das
- Constituency: Jharsuguda

Personal details
- Political party: Bharatiya Janata Party
- Profession: Politician

Tankadhar Tripathy is an Indian politician from Odisha. He is a Member of the Odisha Legislative Assembly from 2024, representing Jharsuguda Assembly constituency as a Member of the Bharatiya Janata Party.

== See also ==
- 2024 Odisha Legislative Assembly election
- Odisha Legislative Assembly
