= Jharsuguda Assembly constituency =

Constituency of the Odisha legislative assembly in India

Coordinates: 21.87°N 84.01°E

Jharsuguda
- Constituency No. 7 for the Odisha Legislative Assembly

Constituency details
- Country: India
- Region: East India
- State: Odisha
- Division: Northern Division
- District: Jharsuguda
- Lok Sabha constituency: Bargarh
- Established: 1951
- Total electors: 2,29,274 (Note: as on 2024) (Note: as data published by election commission)
- Reservation: None

Member of Legislative Assembly
- 17th Odisha Legislative Assembly
- Incumbent Tankadhar Tripathy
- Party: Bharatiya Janata Party
- Elected year: 2024

Jharsuguda is an Assembly constituency of Jharsuguda district in Odisha State. It was established in 1951. In the 2008 delimitation, Laikera Assembly constituency was merged into this constituency.

== Extent of Assembly Constituencies ==
- Jharsuguda Block : Badmal, Dalki, Durlaga, H. Katapali, Hirma, Jamera, Katikela, Malda, Marakuta, Patrapali, Sripura and Talpatia GPs
- Kirmira Block
- Laikera Block
- Kolabira Block
- Jharsuguda Muncipalty.

Map of Jharsuguda Constituency

== Elected members ==
Vote share of winning candidates
2024	47.69%
2023 (bypoll)	60.93%
2019	55.97%
2014	45.1%
2009	49.28%
2004	52.04%
2000	69.10%
1995	43.36%
1990	38.16%
1985	66.18%
1980	58.16%
1977	49.08%

Since its formation in 1951, 18 elections have been held till date including one bypoll in 2023. It was a 2-member constituency for 1952 & 1957.

List of members elected from Jharsuguda constituency are

Year	Member	Party
As Jharsuguda Constituency
2024	Tankadhar Tripathy	Bharatiya Janata Party
2023 (bypoll) (Note: Death of Naba Kishore Das)	Dipali Das	Biju Janata Dal
2019	Naba Kishore Das	Biju Janata Dal
2014	Naba Kishore Das	Indian National Congress
2009	Naba Kishore Das	Indian National Congress
2004	Kishore Kumar Mohanty	Biju Janata Dal
2000	Kishore Kumar Mohanty	Biju Janata Dal
1995	Birendra Pandey	Indian National Congress
1990	Kishore Kumar Mohanty	Janata Dal
1985	Birendra Pandey	Indian National Congress
1980	Birendra Pandey	Indian National Congress (I)
1977	Sairindri Nayak	Indian National Congress
1974	Sairindri Nayak	Indian National Congress
1971	Jhasaketana Sahu	Indian National Congress (R)
1967	Murali Prasad Mishra	Swatantra Party
1961	Binod Behari Singh Bariha	Indian National Congress
1957 (Note: It was a 2 member constituency)	Manohar Singh Naik (Note: As Jharsuguda (ST))	Ganatantra Parishad
1957	Bijoy Kumar Pani	Ganatantra Parishad
As Jharsuguda-Rampella Constituency
1951 (Note: It was a 2 member constituency)	Manohar Singh Naik (Note: As Jharsuguda-Rampella (ST))	Ganatantra Parishad
1951	Bijoy Kumar Pani	Indian National Congress

== Election results ==
=== 2024 ===
Voting were held on 20 May 2024 in 2nd phase of Odisha Assembly Election & 5th phase of Indian General Election. Counting of votes was on 4 June 2024. In 2024 election, Bharatiya Janata Party candidate Tankadhar Tripathy defeated Biju Janata Dal candidate Dipali Das by a margin of 1,333 votes.

2024 Odisha Vidhan Sabha Election: Jharsuguda
Party	Candidate	Votes	%	±%
BJP	Tankadhar Tripathy	91,105	47.69	▲14.45
BJD	Dipali Das	89,772	47	▼13.93
INC	Amita Biswal	5,775	3.02	▲0.46
NOTA	None of the above	1,297	0.68	▼0.5
Majority		1,333	0.67	▼26.73
Turnout		1,91,020	83.32	
BJP gain from BJD		Swing		

=== 2023 Bypoll ===
In 2023 bye-election, Biju Janata Dal candidate Dipali Das defeated Bharatiya Janata Party candidate Tankadhar Tripathy by 48,721 votes.

2023 Odisha Vidhan Sabha by-election: Jharsuguda
Party	Candidate	Votes	%	±%
BJD	Dipali Das	107,198	60.93	▲4.87
BJP	Tankadhar Tripathy	58,477	33.24	▲3.15
INC	Tarun Pandey	4,496	2.56	▼8.14
NOTA	None of the Above	2,074	1.18	
Majority		48,271	27.4	
Turnout		1,75,932		
BJD hold				

=== 2019 ===
In 2019 election, Biju Janata Dal candidate Naba Kishore Das defeated Bharatiya Janata Party candidate Dinesh Kumar Jain by 45,699 votes.

2019 Odisha Vidhan Sabha Election: Jharsuguda
Party	Candidate	Votes	%	±%
BJD	Naba Kishore Das	98,620	55.97	▲17.87
BJP	Dinesh Kumar Jain	52,921	30.04	▲17.30
INC	Mahendra Naik	18,823	10.68	▼34.42
NOTA	None of the above	1,440	0.82	−
Majority		45,699	25.93	
Turnout		1,76.187	78.92	
BJD gain from INC				

=== 2014 ===
In 2014 election, Indian National Congress candidate Naba Kishore Das defeated Biju Janata Dal candidate Kishore Kumar Mohanty by 11,563 votes.

2014 Odisha Vidhan Sabha Election: Jharsuguda
Party	Candidate	Votes	%	±%
INC	Naba Kishore Das	74,499	45.1	▼4.18
BJD	Kishore Kumar Mohanty	62,936	38.1	▲6.52
BJP	Anand Pradhan	21,047	12.74	▲0.87
NOTA	None of the above	1,463	0.89	−
Majority		11,563	6.99	
Turnout		1,65,197	83.79	11.08
Registered electors		1,97,147		
INC hold				

=== 2009 ===
In 2009 election, Indian National Congress candidate Naba Kishore Das defeated Biju Janata Dal candidate Kishore Kumar Mohanty by 22,516 votes.

2009 Odisha Vidhan Sabha Election: Jharsuguda
Party	Candidate	Votes	%	±%
INC	Naba Kishore Das	62,663	49.28	−
BJD	Kishore Kumar Mohanty	40,147	31.58	−
BJP	Dinesh Kumar Jain	15,095	11.87	−
Majority		22,516	17.71 (Note: %of total valid votes)	
Turnout		1,27,151	72.71	
INC gain from BJD				

== See also ==
- List of constituencies of the Odisha Legislative Assembly
- Jharsuguda district
