= Naba Das =

Indian politician (1962–2023)

Naba Kishore Das
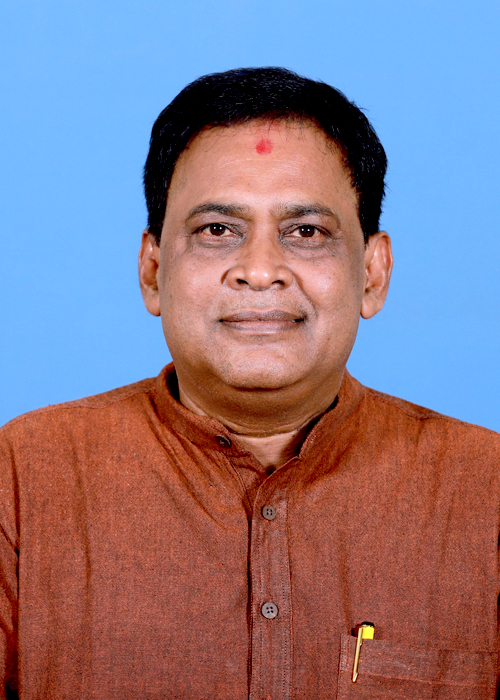
- Official portrait, 2020

Member of the Odisha Legislative Assembly
- In office 19 May 2009 – 29 January 2023
- Preceded by: Kishore Kumar Mohanty
- Succeeded by: Dipali Das
- Constituency: Jharsuguda

Personal details
- Born: Naba Kishore Das; 7 January 1962 Odisha, India
- Died: 29 January 2023 (aged 61) Bhubaneswar, Odisha, India
- Cause of death: Assassination (gunshot wounds)
- Party: Biju Janata Dal
- Other political affiliations: Indian National Congress (Before 2019)
- Spouse: Minati Das
- Children: Dipali Das, Bishal Das
- Occupation: Politician; businessperson
- Website: Official website

Naba Kishore Das (7 January 1962 – 29 January 2023) was an Indian politician who was a member of Odisha Legislative Assembly, representing Jharsuguda from 2009 until his assassination in 2023. Originally a member of the Indian National Congress (INC), he later switched to Biju Janata Dal.

== Early life ==
Naba Kishore Das was born on January 7, 1962 in a Karan family in Mirgamunda Village Of Maneshwar Block Of Rengali Vidhan Sabha

== Political career ==
Das was a member of Biju Janata Dal in Odisha politics. Earlier, he was in the INC. Das was elected to the 14th Odisha Legislative Assembly with 62,663 votes. He was then elected to the 15th Odisha Legislative Assembly for a second term. He was also elected to the 16th Odisha Legislative Assembly for a third consecutive term, this time representing Biju Janata Dal. At the time of his assassination, he was the state's Minister of Health and Family Welfare.

== Death ==
On 29 January 2023, a policeman of ASI (Assistant sub-inspector) rank, fired four or five bullets at Das as he stepped out of his car at Gandhi square. The incident took place in Brajarajnagar, Jharsuguda district, where the minister was to attend a meeting. He later died whilst undergoing treatment at a hospital in Bhubaneswar. The Odisha Government ordered an inquiry into the incident. The Crime Branch took the accused policeman to the neighbouring Sundargargh district, where senior officers, including ADG Arun Bothra, questioned him.

"Health Minister Naba Das was admitted to Apollo with gunshot wounds to the left chest. A team of doctors led by Dr Debashish Nayak immediately attended to and operated on him. During the operation, it was found that a single bullet had entered and exited the body, injuring the heart and left lung and causing massive internal bleeding and injury. The injuries were repaired, and steps were taken to improve the pumping of the heart. He was given urgent ICU care. But despite best efforts, he could not be revived and succumbed to his injuries," the statement read.

A 3-day state mourning was declared in Odisha. According to an official statement from the Odisha government, the national flag flew at half-mast on the day of death and on the day of the funeral.
