= Pratap Chandra Mohanty =

Indian politician

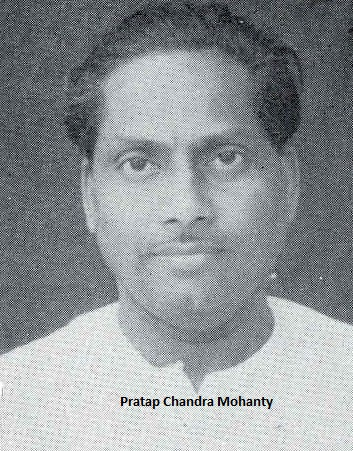

Minister, Revenue (Odisha)
- In office 26 June 1977 – 17 February 1980
- In office 03 April 1971 – 14 June 1972

Minister, Irrigation & Power - Lift Irrigation (Odisha)
- In office 26 June 1977 – 17 February 1980
- In office 03 April 1971 – 14 June 1972

Minister, Commerce & Transport (Odisha)
- In office 26 June 1977 – 25 October 1979

Minister, Education & Youth Services (Odisha)
- In office 25 October 1979 – 17 February 1980

Member of Odisha Legislative Assembly
- In office 1971–1980
- Preceded by: Nishamani Khuntia
- Succeeded by: Basant Kumar Biswal
- Constituency: Tirtol

Personal details
- Born: Pratap Chandra Mohanty; 23 October 1920 Kanakpur, Jagatsinghpur district
- Died: 15 March 1993 (aged 72) Cuttack
- Party: Janata Party
- Other political affiliations: Utkal Congress; Indian National Congress
- Spouse: Smt. Charubala Dei
- Children: 6 Daughters and 2 Sons
- Education: Ravenshaw College, Cuttack
- Occupation: Business

Pratap Chandra Mohanty (October 23, 1920 – March 15, 1993) was a politician from Odisha, India. From Tirtol constituency, he was elected 4 times to the Odisha Legislative Assembly during the 3rd (1961), 5th (1971), 6th (1974), and 7th (1977) assembly elections. He was a cabinet minister in Odisha holding Revenue, Irrigation & Power (Lift Irrigation), Commerce & Transport, Education & Youth Affairs portfolios in the 1970s. Pratap Chandra Mohanty was also detained under Maintenance of Internal Security Act (MISA) for about one year during The Emergency. He was the president of Maa Sarala Temple Trust, Jagatsinghpur from 9 December 1957 to 26 October 1966.

== Personal life ==
He was born on 23 October 1920 in a Karan family.
