= Susanta Singh =

Indian politician (1973–2026)

- Born: 17 March 1973; Bausenmora, Orissa, India
- Died: 27 July 2026 (aged 53); Bhubaneswar, Odisha, India
- Occupation: Politician

Susanta Singh (17 March 1973 – 27 July 2026) was an Indian politician from Bhatli constituency. He was a member of Biju Janata Dal.

Singh died on 27 July 2026, at the age of 53.
