= Dipali Das =

Indian politician

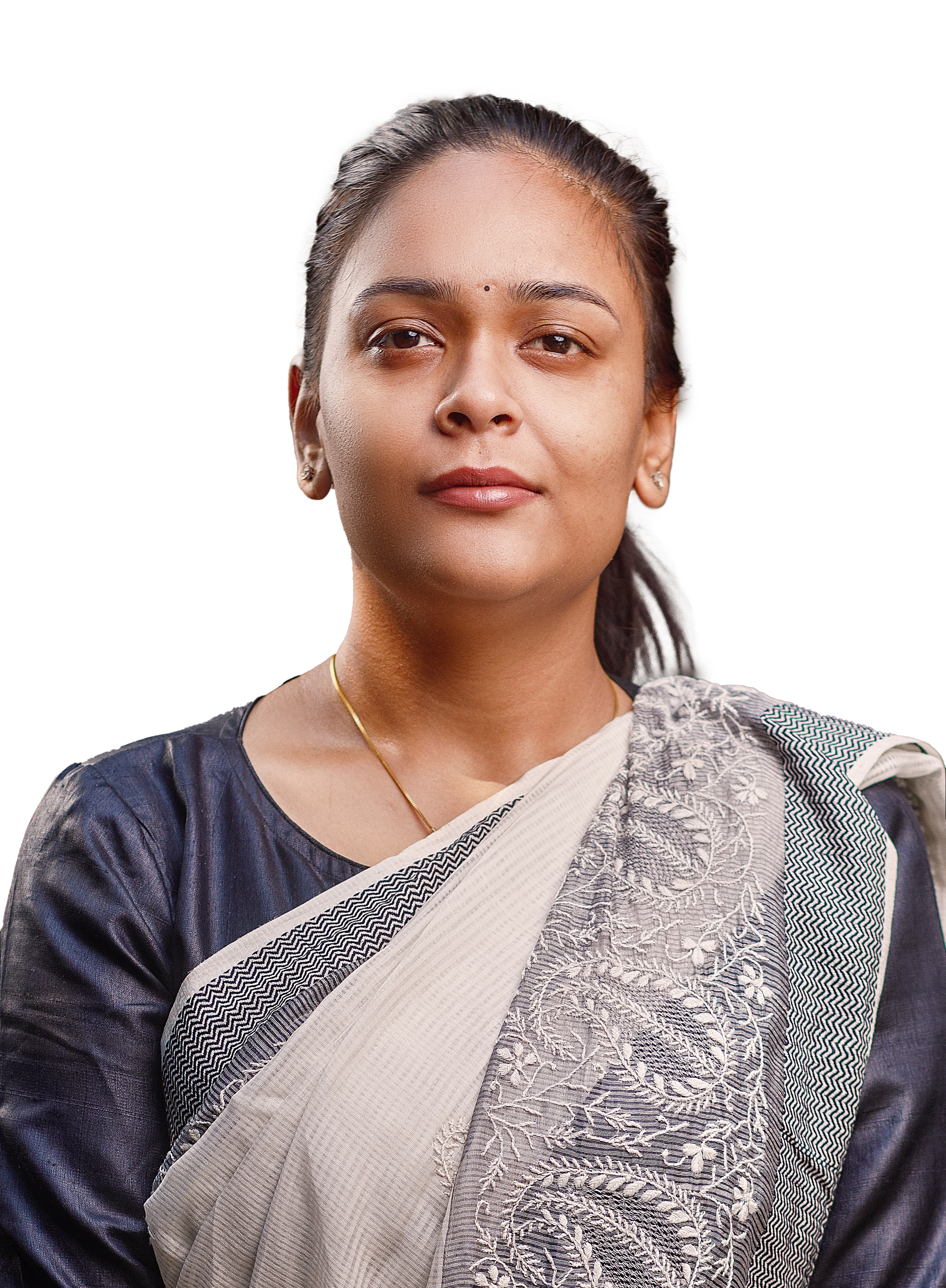

Member of the Odisha Legislative Assembly
- In office 10 May 2023 – 4 June 2024
- Preceded by: Naba Kishore Das
- Constituency: Jharsuguda

Personal details
- Born: 27 January 1997 (age 29)
- Citizenship: Indian
- Party: Biju Janata Dal
- Parent: Naba Kishore Das (father)
- Occupation: politician

Dipali Das is an Indian politician from Biju Janata Dal and daughter of Naba Kishore Das who was a Member of Odisha Legislative Assembly from Jharsuguda Assembly constituency and was killed on 29 January 2023. She won the bypoll defeating Tankadhar Tripathy of BJP by over 48,000 votes.

== Early life ==
She was born in a well known Karan family. Das made her political debut after her father's death. She is a commerce graduate from K.C. College, Mumbai and in 2020, she completed her MBA from EU Business School in Barcelona, Spain.
