= Pradip Purohit =

Member of the Lok Sabha

Pradeep Purohit
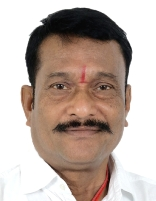
- Official Portrait

Member of Odisha Legislative Assembly
- In office 2014–2019
- Preceded by: Bijay Ranjan Singh Bariha
- Succeeded by: Bijay Ranjan Singh Bariha
- Constituency: Padampur

Member of Parliament, Lok Sabha
- Incumbent
- Assumed office 4 June 2024
- Preceded by: Suresh Pujari
- Constituency: Bargarh

Personal details
- Born: Pradeep Purohit; 5 April 1964 (age 62) Paikmal
- Party: Bharatiya Janata Party
- Spouse: Pratima Purohit
- Education: 11th Pass
- Profession: Cultivation

Pradeep Purohit is an Indian politician. He was elected to become the Member of Parliament in Lok Sabha representing Bargarh in the 2024 National Election. A candidate from the Bharatiya Janata Party (BJP), he has led his party to a win, securing a total of 251,667 votes which is the highest in Odisha in terms of vote margin.

He was also elected to the Odisha Legislative Assembly from Padampur in the 2014 Odisha Legislative Assembly election as a member of the BJP.

In his early career, he started his social life with the "BALCO Hatao Gandhamardan Bachao" movement. He was the founder and coordinator of this andolan. Later, thousands of people from every village in the Padampur sub-division joined him, and he became a public figure.
