= Jagatsinghpur Lok Sabha constituency =

Lok Sabha Constituency in Odisha

Coordinates: 20.210605°N 86.168113°E

Jagatsinghpur (SC) OD-16
- Lok Sabha constituency
- Interactive Map Outlining Jagatsinghpur Lok Sabha constituency

Constituency details
- Country: India
- Region: East India
- State: Odisha
- Assembly constituencies: Niali; Paradeep; Tirtol; Balikuda-Erasama; Jagatsinghpur; Kakatpur; Nimapara
- Established: 1977
- Total electors: 17,03,489 (Note: as on 2024) (Note: as data published by election commission)
- Reservation: SC

Member of Parliament
- 18th Lok Sabha
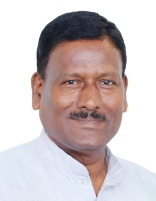
- Incumbent Bibhu Prasad Tarai
- Party: BJP
- Elected year: 2024

Jagatsinghpur Lok Sabha Constituency is one of the 21 Lok Sabha (Parliamentary) Constituencies in Odisha state in Eastern India.

== Assembly segments ==
Assembly Constituencies which constitute this Parliamentary Constituency, after delimitation of Parliamentary Constituencies and Legislative Assembly Constituencies of 2008 are:

#	Name	District	Member	Party	Leading (in 2024)
92	Niali (SC)	Cuttack	Chhabi Malik	BJP	BJP
101	Paradeep	Jagatsinghpur	Sampad Chandra Swain	BJP	BJP
102	Tirtol (SC)	Jagatsinghpur	Ramakanta Bhoi	BJD	BJD
103	Balikuda-Erasama	Jagatsinghpur	Sarada Prasanna Jena	BJD	BJD
104	Jagatsinghpur	Jagatsinghpur	Amarendra Das	BJP	BJP
105	Kakatpur (SC)	Puri	Tusharkanti Behera	BJD	BJD
106	Nimapara	Puri	Pravati Parida	BJP	BJD

Assembly Constituencies which constituted this Parliamentary Constituency, before delimitation of Parliamentary Constituencies and Legislative Assembly Constituencies of 2008 are: Tirtol, Balikuda, Erasama, Jagatsinghpur, Gobindpur, Nimapada and Kakatpur.

== Elected members ==
Vote share of winning candidates
2024	45.80%
2019	50.41%
2014	41.64%
2009	31.42%
2004	50.34%
1999	58.00%
1998	44.84%
1996	46.07%
1991	48.09%
1989	59.48%
1984	48.19%
1980	50.97%
1977	57.3%

Since its formation in 1977, 13 elections have been held till date.

List of members elected from Jagatsinghpur constituency are

Year	Member	Party
1977	Pradyumna Kishore Bal	Bharatiya Lok Dal
1980	Lakshman Mallick	Indian National Congress (I)
1984	Lakshman Mallick	Indian National Congress
1989	Lokanath Choudhary	Communist Party of India
1991	Lokanath Choudhary	Communist Party of India
1996	Ranjib Biswal	Indian National Congress
1998	Ranjib Biswal	Indian National Congress
1999	Trilochan Kanungo	Biju Janata Dal
2004	Brahmananda Panda	Biju Janata Dal
2009	Bibhu Prasad Tarai	Communist Party of India
2014	Kulamani Samal	Biju Janata Dal
2019	Rajashree Mallick	Biju Janata Dal
2024	Bibhu Prasad Tarai	Bharatiya Janata Party

== Election results ==
=== 2024 ===
Voting were held on 1 June 2024 in 7th phase of Indian General Election. Counting of votes was on 4 June 2024. In 2024 election, Bharatiya Janata Party candidate Bibhu Prasad Tarai defeated Biju Janata Dal candidate Rajashree Mallick by a margin of 40,696 votes.

2024 Indian general election: Jagatsinghpur
Party	Candidate	Votes	%	±%
BJP	Bibhu Prasad Tarai	589,093	45.80	
BJD	Rajashree Mallick	5,48,397	42.63	
INC	Rabindra Kumar Sethy	1,23,570	9.61	
NOTA	None of the above	4,882	0.38	
Majority		40,696	3.17	
Turnout		12,91,326	75.8	
BJP gain from BJD				

=== 2019 ===
In 2019 election, Biju Janata Dal candidate Rajashree Mallick defeated Bharatiya Janata Party candidate Bibhu Prasad Tarai by a margin of 2,71,655 votes.

2019 Indian general elections: Jagatsinghpur
Party	Candidate	Votes	%	±%
BJD	Rajashree Mallick	619,985	50.44	▼4.73
BJP	Bibhu Prasad Tarai	3,48,330	28.34	▲17.97
INC	Pratima Mallick	2,39,684	19.5	▼11.25
BSP	Bibhuti Bhusan Majhi	5,244	0.43	▼0.17
JPJD	Jagannath Megh	1,237	0.1	
ABHM	Dipak Kumar Das	1,503	0.12	
API	Peeyuush Das	1,751	0.14	
FPI	Anil Kumar Behera	3,586	0.29	
Independent	Sasmita Das	1,813	0.15	
NOTA	None of the above	6,057	0.49	
Majority		2,71,655	22.10	▼2.32
Turnout		12,29,827	74.83	
BJD hold		Swing	▼6.62	

=== 2014 ===
In 2014 election, Biju Janata Dal candidate Kulamani Samal defeated Indian National Congress candidate Bibhu Prasad Tarai by a margin of 2,76,394 votes.

2014 Indian general elections: Jagatsinghpur
Party	Candidate	Votes	%	±%
BJD	Kulamani Samal	624,492	55.17	
INC	Bibhu Prasad Tarai	3,48,098	30.75	
BJP	Baidhar Mallik	1,17,448	10.37	
CPI	Ajaya Kumar Behera	18,099	1.59	
BSP	Pradeep Kumar Mallik	6,895	0.60	
AAP	Anupam Sethi	5,929	0.52	
Independent	Manas Kumar Behera	3,347	0.29	
NOTA	None of the above	7,624	0.67	
Majority		2,76,394	24.42	
Turnout		11,32,868	75.54	
BJD gain from CPI				

=== 2009 ===
In 2009 election, Communist Party of India candidate Bibhu Prasad Tarai defeated Indian National Congress candidate Rabindra Kumar Sethy by a margin of 76,735 votes.

2009 Indian general elections: Jagatsinghpur
Party	Candidate	Votes	%	±%
CPI	Bibhu Prasad Tarai	457,234	31.42	
INC	Rabindra Kumar Sethy	3,80,499	26.14	
BJP	Baidhar Malick	99,100	6.81	
Majority		76,735	7.80	
Turnout		9,83,314	67.56	
CPI gain from BJD				
