= Sanjay Bhoi =

Indian politician from Odisha

Personal details
- Born: Paikmal, Odisha, India
- Party: Indian National Congress
- Other political affiliations: Bharatiya Janata Party
- Education: Delhi University
- Profession: IT professional

Sanjay Bhoi is an Indian politician from Odisha in India. He was MP from Bargarh Lok Sabha from INC in 2009.

== Early life and education ==
Sanjay Bhoi, son of Krupasindhu Bhoi, was born in the village of Paikmal in Baragarh, Orissa. He completed his education at CSKM Public School and later pursued further studies at Delhi University, where he obtained his qualifications. Afterward, he worked as a project manager in a multinational software company for six years before returning to Orissa following his father's death.

Recognized for his grassroots leadership, Sanjay has initiated various social service projects in his district, including cultural events aimed at highlighting the challenges of western Orissa. He is actively engaged in efforts to address starvation deaths in the region.

== Political career ==
An IT professional by education Sanjay was chosen by congress party to contest Lok Sabha election in Bargarh but he was defeated by Radharani Panda of Bharatiya Janata Party by over one lakh votes. He was 3rd in 2014 Lok sabha election from Bargarh (Lok Sabha constituency)

== See also ==
- Bargarh (Lok Sabha constituency)
- Indian general election in Orissa, 2009
- Indian National Congress
