= Lokanath Choudhary =

Indian politician (1925–2003)

Member of Parliament, Lok Sabha
- In office 1989–1996
- Preceded by: Ranjib Biswal
- Succeeded by: Brahmananda Panda
- Constituency: Jagatsinghpur, Odisha

Personal details
- Born: 14 May 1925 Taldanda, Cuttack district, Odisha, British India
- Died: 12 May 2003 (aged 77)
- Party: Communist Party of India
- Spouse: Malati Choudhary

Lokanath Choudhary (1925-2003) was an Indian politician. He was elected to the Lok Sabha, the lower house of the Parliament of India as a member of the Communist Party of India. He was elected to the Lok Sabha twice in 1989 and 1991 and thrice to the state assembly in 1957, 1961 and 1974. He Choudhury was secretary of the Utkal State Council of CPI for nine years between 1986 and 1994.
