= Prabhas Kumar Singh =

Indian politician

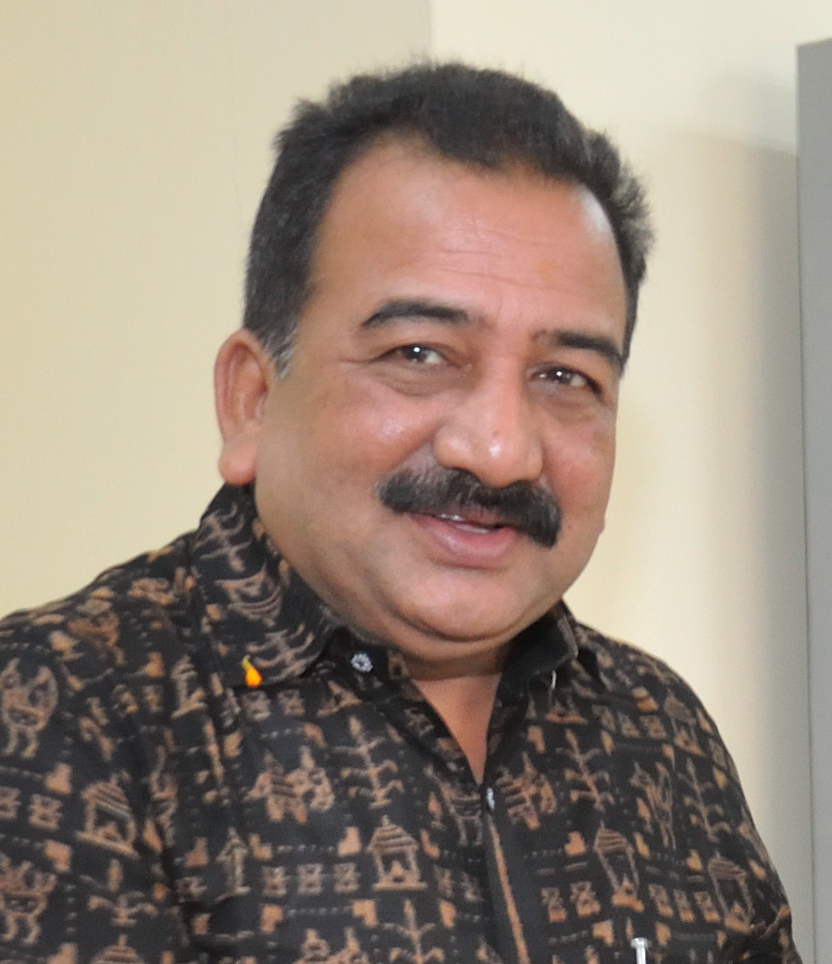

Member of parliament, Lok Sabha
- In office 1 September 2014 – 23 May 2019
- Constituency: Bargarh

Personal details
- Born: 25 June 1964 (age 62) Bhatigaon, Bargarh, Odisha
- Party: Bharatiya Janata Party
- Other political affiliations: Biju Janata Dal
- Spouse: Smt. Manjushree Singh
- Children: 2
- Education: Sambalpur University, Utkal University
- Occupation: Agriculturist
- As of 16 December, 2016

Prabhas Kumar Singh is an Indian politician. He was Member of Parliament for Bargarh constituency in Odisha, which he represented in the 16th Lok Sabha from 2014 to 2019. He is a member of the Biju Janata Dal. He was elected in 2014 by a margin of 11,178 votes, or 1.01% of the votes cast.

Prabhas Kumar Singh resigned from the primary membership of the Biju Janata Dal (BJD) ahead of the Lok Sabha and Odisha Assembly polls on 8 April 2024.

== See also ==
- Indian general election, 2014 (Odisha)
