= Ramakanta Bhoi =

Indian politician

Member of Odisha Legislative Assembly
- Incumbent
- Assumed office 4 June 2024
- Preceded by: Bijaya Shankar Das
- Constituency: Tirtol

Personal details
- Party: Biju Janata Dal
- Profession: Politician

Ramakanta Bhoi is an Indian politician who was elected to the Odisha Legislative Assembly from Tirtol as a member of the Biju Janata Dal.
