= Rita Sahu =

Indian politician

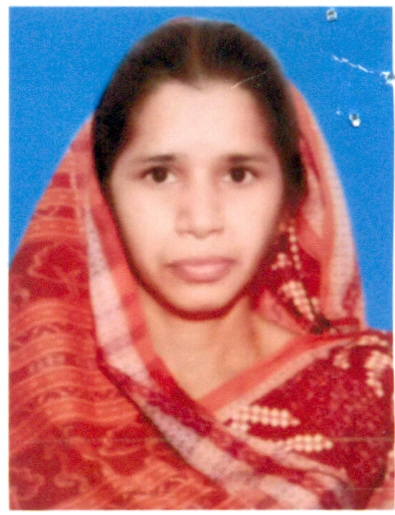

Minister of State (Independent Charge) for Handlooms, Textiles & Handicrafts
- In office 5 June 2022 – 11 June 2024
- Preceded by: Padmini Dian
- Succeeded by: Suryabanshi Suraj

Member of the Odisha Legislative Assembly
- In office 24 October 2019 – 4 June 2024
- Preceded by: Naveen Patnaik
- Succeeded by: Sanat Kumar Gartia
- Constituency: Bijepur
- In office 28 February 2018 – 24 May 2019
- Preceded by: Subal Sahu
- Succeeded by: Naveen Patnaik

Personal details
- Born: 19 June 1971 (age 55)
- Party: Biju Janata Dal
- Spouse: Subal Sahu (died 2017)

Rita Sahu (born 19 June 1971) is an Indian politician belonging to the Biju Janata Dal (BJD). She served as a Member of the Odisha Legislative Assembly representing the Bijepur across two distinct terms (2018–2019 and 2019–2024). She also served as the Minister of State (Independent Charge) for Handlooms, Textiles & Handicrafts in the Fifth Naveen Patnaik ministry from 2022 to 2024.

== Political career ==
Sahu entered politics following the death of her husband, Subal Sahu, who had been elected three times from the Bijepur constituency as an Indian National Congress politician. Entering the fray under the BJD banner, she won the subsequent by-election on 28 February 2018 and served until the dissolution of the assembly in May 2019.

Although BJD president Naveen Patnaik contested and won the Bijepur seat in the 2019 general election, he later vacated it to retain his traditional constituency. This triggered another by-election on 24 October 2019, which Sahu won with a historic, record-breaking margin of 97,990 votes. On 5 June 2022, she was inducted into the state cabinet as a minister.

Sahu contested the 2024 Odisha Legislative Assembly election to seek re-election from Bijepur, but lost to Sanat Kumar Gartia of the Bharatiya Janata Party by a margin of 10,066 votes.

State Legislative Assembly
Preceded by Subal Sahu (Congress)	Member of the Odisha Legislative Assembly from Bijepur Assembly constituency 2018 Bye election – 2019	Succeeded by Naveen Patnaik (BJD)
Preceded by Naveen Patnaik (BJD); Vacated	Member of the Odisha Legislative Assembly from Bijepur Assembly constituency 2019 Bye election–	Incumbent
