= Barsha Singh Bariha =

Indian politician

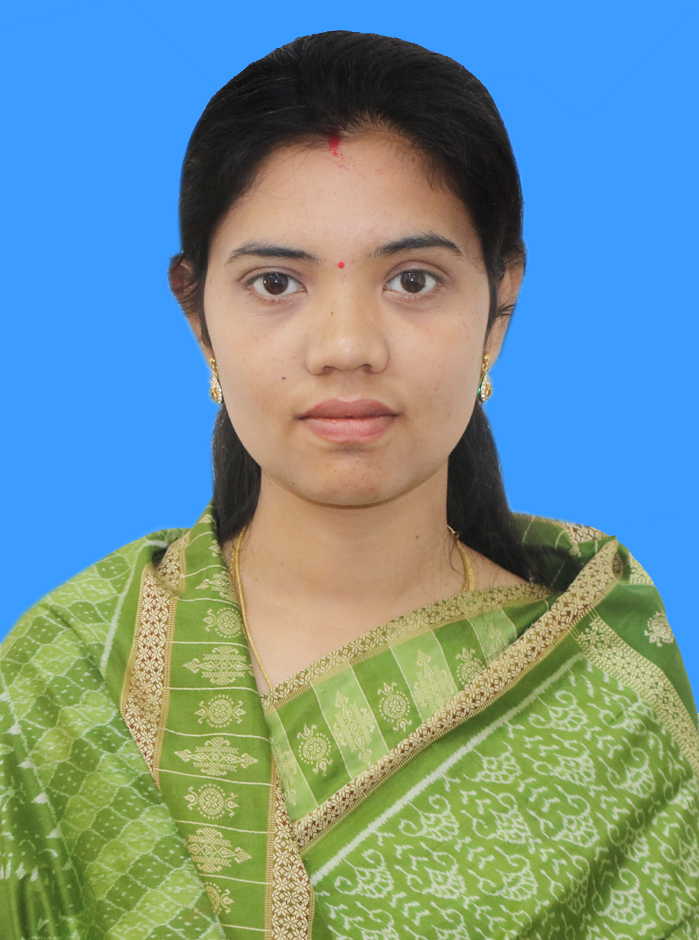

Member of Odisha Legislative Assembly
- Incumbent
- Assumed office 5 December 2022
- Preceded by: Bijaya Ranjan Singh Bariha
- Constituency: Padampur

Personal details
- Born: 17 August 1993 (age 32) Padampur, Odisha
- Party: Biju Janta Dal
- Parents: Bijaya Ranjan Singh Bariha (father); Tilottama Singh Bariha (mother)

Barsha Singh Bariha is an Indian politician from the Biju Janata Dal representing the Padampur constituency in the Odisha Legislative Assembly.

== Biography ==
She won the 5 December 2022 by-election with 120,807 votes and a margin of 42,679 votes, following the death of her father, Bijaya Ranjan Singh Bariha, who previously held the seat. She is the daughter-in-law of Ramaranjan Baliarsingh, a former member of Odisha Legislative Assembly from Satyabadi constituency.
