= Radharani Panda =

Indian politician

Radharani Panda(Odia: ରାଧାରାଣୀ ପଣ୍ଡା) is an Indian politician from Bharatiya Janata Party who served as a Member of the lower house of Parliament, from 2009 to 2014 representing Bargarh. She was also a member of the Odisha Legislative Assembly from 2014 to 2019 representing Brajarajnagar. In the 2022 elections in India, she was the candidate from BJP for Brajarajnagar bypolls but she lost to Alaka Mohanty of BJD.
