= Brahmananda Panda =

Indian politician

MP, 14th Lok Sabha
- Constituency: Jagatsinghpur

Personal details
- Born: 3 April 1949 Jagatsinghpur, Orissa
- Died: 30 January 2010 (aged 60)
- Party: BJD
- Spouse: Namita Panda
- Children: 2 Sons
- As of 22 September, 2006

Brahmananda Panda (3 April 1949 – 30 January 2010) was a member of the 14th Lok Sabha of India. He represented the Jagatsinghpur constituency of Orissa and is a member of the Biju Janata Dal (BJD) political party.
