= Subash Chouhan =

Indian politician

- Born: 1966; Bargarh district, Orissa, India
- Died: 10 May 2020 (aged 53–54); Bhubaneswar
- Occupation: extremist leader
- Known for: National president of the Bajrang Dal

Subash Chouhan was the national President of the Bajrang Dal (army of Hanuman), an Indian Hindutva militant organisation that is the youth wing of the Vishwa Hindu Parishad (VHP).

From 1995 to 2000 he was the Orissa state president of Hindu Jagran Manch. From 2000 to 2003 he was Joint prachar pramukh of Rashtriya Swayamsevak Sangh (RSS) Orissa. In 2001 Subash Chouhan was also convenor of the Hindu Jagran Sammukhya. From 2003 to 2006 Subash Chouhan was Convener of Bajrang Dal in Orissa. From 2006 to 2007 he was zonal Convener of Bajrang Dal. He was appointed co-convener of the Bajrang Dal at the national level in 2008. In July 2010 he was appointed Bajrang Dal National convenor and worked till October 2012.

== Hindu nationalism and morality ==
Graham Staines was an Australian missionary who was burned to death in his car with his two young sons in January 1999. Eyewitnesses said the people who committed the murder were shouting "Long live Bajrang Dal". However, in February 2003 India's Central Bureau of Investigation said none of the suspects belonged to the Bajrang Dal. According to Subash Chouhan, "We were framed ... Now the truth has come to light". When Bollywood film producer Sunil Agnihotri said he was ready to start work on his film The Murder of a Missionary, Subash Chouhan said "We will not allow the producer to shoot ... Such films will encourage the conversion of poor tribals to Christianity". Subash Chouhan said his organization planned to make a movie called Dara: The Hero about Dara Singh, the man who was convicted of the murder. He said "For us Staines was nothing less than a villain". He said the film would depict the "good work done by Dara in preventing conversion and cow slaughter" in the tribal areas.

In July 2009 Subash Chouhan said two of the Bajrang Dal's main concerns were a complete ban on cow slaughtering and protecting poor people from conversion. He said "Our aim is to reset the glory of Rama Raj and realize the dream of Mahatma Gandhi". His organization was planning a major recruitment drive in the silver jubilee year, and was planning blood donation drives, forestry projects, anti-narcotics programs and programs to raise awareness of environmental problems and other social evils. In January 2008 he condemned a political science textbook named Indian Polity which described the Bharatiya Janata Party (BJP), Bajarang Dal, Shiv Sena and Rashtriya Swayamsevak Sangh (RSS) as "extensions of terrorist organisations". The publisher apologized for the mistake and said the book would be corrected.

In February 2010 Subash Chouhan said his group would not allow the movie My Name Is Khan to be screened in Orissa. He said of the star "Shah Rukh has behaved like an agent of Pakistan by advocating the cause of Pakistani cricketers participating in the Indian Premier League". In December 2011 the United Progressive Alliance national government said they would allow job reservation for minorities. In protest, Bajrang Dal activists held a motorcycle rally in Jharsuguda, Orissa. Speaking at the rally, Subash Chouhan called the government action a violation of the constitution whose purpose was to woo voters from minority groups. In February 2012, with Valentine's Day approaching, he warned couples that "They cannot kiss or hug in public places. Our activists will beat them up". He said "We are not against love, but we criticize vulgar exhibition of love at public places".

== Conversion ==
In 2003, as Orissa state convenor for the Bajrang Dal, Subash Chouhan claimed that missionaries in the state were zealously converting Adivasis (tribal people) to Christianity, while "Islam fanatics" were converting Dalits (formerly called "untouchables") to Islam. He said that "reconversion" was working well with the Christians, but they were having less success with the Muslims since the mullahs "guard their children like chickens". He suggested that the Bajrang Dal might have to use force to "get the job done". In February 2005 two Protestant clergymen were killed in separate incidents in Orissa. According to the Organizer, the official weekly newspaper of the RSS, the recent violence was "a spontaneous reaction by local people against missioners adamant on conversion". Subash Chouhan was quoted as saying "Christian organizations are on a warpath—accept their religion or face the music". In February 2012 as National President of the Bajarang Dal he attended a ceremony at Sundergarh, Orissa organised by the VHP at which 3,127 people were converted to Hinduism.

== Communal violence ==
A June 2005 session of the Indian People's Tribunal investigating communal conflict in Orissa was disrupted by Hindu nationalists who threatened to rape female members of the tribunal and parade them naked through the streets. Subash Chouhan denied that threats of rape had been made by Bajrang Dal members. However Angana Chatterji, the co-convenor of the tribunal, reported in a letter to the National Human Rights Commission of India that Chouhan had said "if I continue, the Bajrang Dal and the Vishwa Hindu Parishad would strongly challenge and repress me". She noted that Chouhan's statements have been reported in the local press and on TV.

On 23 August 2008 Swami Lakshmanananda Saraswati and other VHP leaders were killed in the Kandhamal district of Orissa. The VHP and Bajrang Dal laid the blame on the Naveen Patnaik government, which they said had ignored warnings and failed to provide adequate security. However, some senior BJP ministers in the government refused to join in the criticism, revealing a split between the BJP and the more extreme "saffron" groups. Subash Chouhan called for the ministers to resign. He said the government's claim that Maoists could be behind the killings was laughable. Later it was reported that the Maoist leader Sabyasachi Panda had said the Maoists had killed Laxamananda Saraswati, who was trying to revive Brahminism, since they wanted to achieve a caste-free society. Panda said Christians were the main supporters of his group and had urged the killings. He said Swami Lakshmanananda had alleged that Christians had been killing cows, which are sacred animals to Hindus, and had been forcibly converting Hindus to Christianity. Christian leaders denied these charges. Subash Chouhan said he did not believe the Maoist leader's claim of responsibility for the killings.

The August killings of VHP leaders triggered a surge of anti-Christian mob violence in Kandhamal district. Thousands of homes were burned and at least 36 people died. Over 20,000 people, mostly Christians, were forced to take shelter in relief camps. A night curfew was imposed and over 600 people were arrested. Chief Minister Naveen Patnaik said on TV that many of those arrested were from Bajrang Dal, which he described as a fundamentalist group. Subash Chouhan denied that any Bajrang Dal had been involved, saying "Bajrang Dal activists are doing selfless service for the country". There was further violence in September in which tribal people attacked police and the police fired back, killing four people. Subash Chouhan said the attack was organized by minorities led by a Christian in order to stir up trouble between the police and the innocent tribals. In October 2008 police prevented a group from entering the district that included Shyamji Gupta, all India joint general secretary of the VHP, Gauri Prasad Rath, Orissa state secretary of the VHP and Subash Chouhan.

In October 2009 a number of US lawmakers wrote to Orissa chief minister Naveen Patnaik voicing their concern about continued violence against Christians in the state. The letter said "... we're concerned that if Hindu extremists can act with impunity toward religious minorities in India, these extremists and their ideologies will begin to affect international security as well". Subash Chouhan reacted by asking: "How can anyone say that Christians are the victims of violence at a time when bombs and firearms are being seized from Christian rehabilitation camp?" Subash Chouhan attacked the Prevention of Communal and Targeted Violence Bill 2011, which he said would lead to even greater polarization and communal conflict. He described the bill as having been planned and conceived at the bidding of foreign powers as part of an "international conspiracy to target the Hindu society, its leaders and organisations".

== See also ==
- Bajrang Dal
- Religious violence in Orissa
