= Sikshasandhan =

Sikshasandhan was established as a resource centre for education in Odisha, India in the year 1995. Sikshasandhan is working in the field of education of marginalised communities such as Scheduled Tribes of India and in the field of multilingual education.

It works in the tribal areas of the state of Odisha, especially in the district of Mayurbhanj. Currently, it is working in making primary education of the Lodha tribe relevant to the children of the community. It is also active in science popularisation work in the tribal dominated southern districts of this East Indian state through mobile labs.

The organisation is headquartered in Bhubaneswar and its operations are headed by Mr. Anil Pradhan, the organisation's Member-Secretary. It was started in 1995 under the chairmanship of noted Odia language author, thinker and educationist Chittaranjan Das.

== Sources ==
- https://scroll.in/article/896228/a-mobile-lab-is-rolling-through-adivasi-villages-in-odisha-introducing-locals-to-basics-of-science
- https://thewire.in/rights/odisha-tribe-lodha
- Mishra, P.K., 2016. Sikshasandhan: Funding challenges and mission drift. Asian Case Research Journal, 20(01), pp. 89–109.
- https://www.dailypioneer.com/2014/state-editions/efforts-should-be-made-to-promote-tribal-culture.html
- https://economictimes.indiatimes.com/news/politics-and-nation/experts-urging-for-a-separate-board-for-elementary-education/articleshow/5747833.cms
- http://www.mainstreamweekly.net/article225.html
