= Charan Hembram =

- Born: Nuagaon, Mayurbhanj district, Odisha, India
- Occupations: Writer, educator, researcher, cultural activist
- Awards: Padma Shri (2026)

Charan Hembram is an Indian Santali writer, educator and tribal cultural activist from Odisha, India. He was awarded the Padma Shri in 2026 in the field of Literature and Education for his contribution to the development and promotion of the Santali language and the preservation of indigenous cultural traditions.

== Early life ==
Hembram hails from Nuagaon in Mayurbhanj district, Odisha. He belongs to the Santali community and grew up in a socio-cultural environment shaped by indigenous traditions and oral heritage.

== Career ==
Hembram has worked for more than three decades as a researcher, educator and writer dedicated to the advancement of the Santali language and tribal education. He has been associated with initiatives aimed at strengthening tribal identity through language development and cultural preservation.

Hembram has established several institutions to make education accessible to tribal children, particularly in rural areas of Odisha. His contributions were recognised with the conferment of the Padma Shri in 2026.
