= Kala Dam =

Dam in Mayurbhanj, Odisha, India

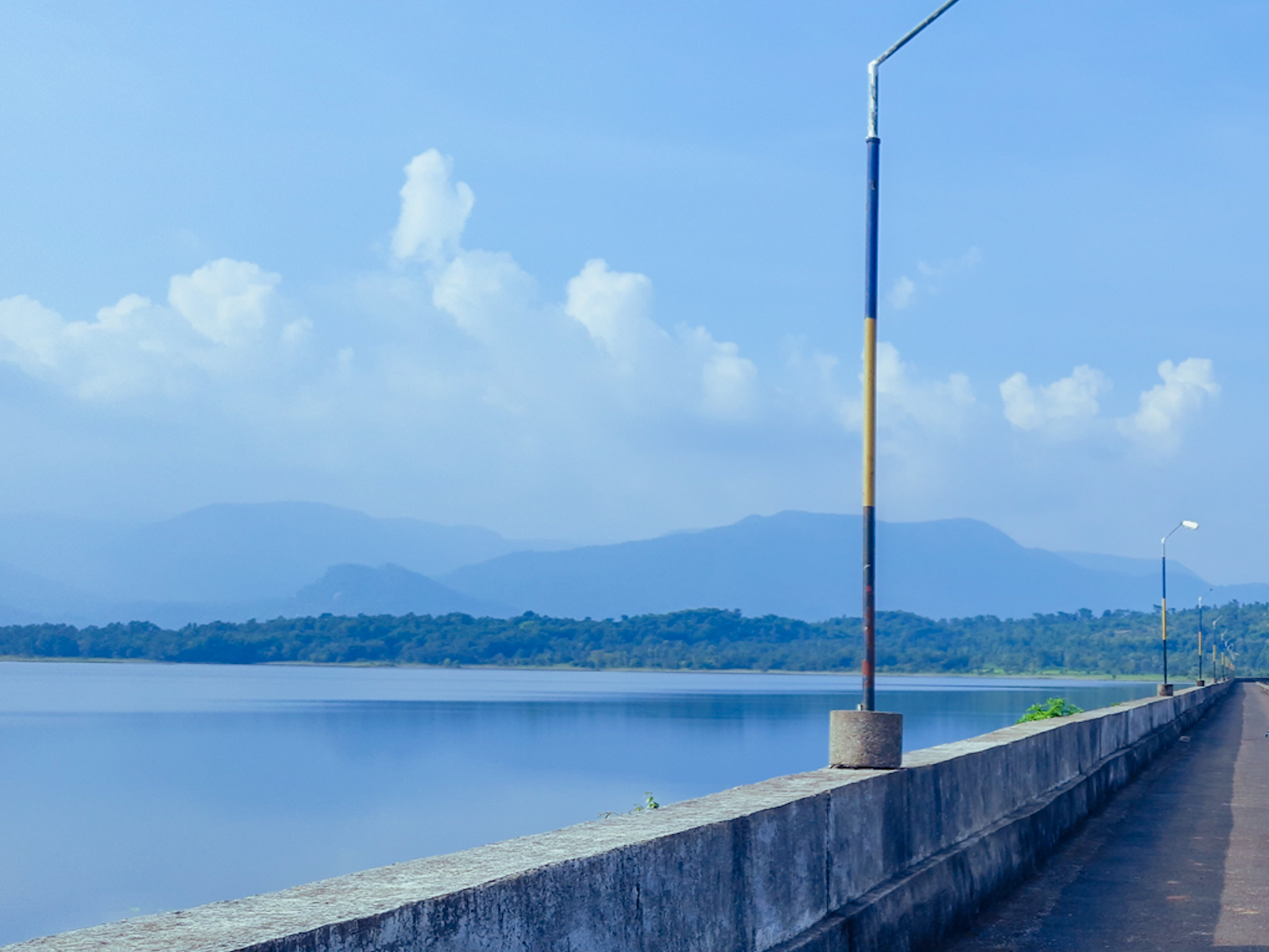
- Kalo dam view with Similipal mountain view in background

- Location within India
- Official name: Kalo dam
- Location: Kaptipada, Mayurbhanj, Odisha
- Coordinates: 21.5243°N 86.4567°E
- Purpose: Irrigation
- Construction began: 1973
- Opening date: 1982

Dam and spillways
- Type of dam: Gravity, masonry
- Impounds: Kala River
- Length: 2,458 m (8,064 ft)
- Spillways: 5
- Spillway type: Ogee spillway

Reservoir
- Total capacity: 29.70 Mm3

Kala or Kalo Dam is a dam in the Mayurbhanj district in the state of Odisha, India. It is located 8 km from Kaptipada, Mayurbhanj. The dam is near about 2 km in length and 3.5 km in breadth. It covers a wide area with plenty of water. The dam provides water to nearby villages.

== Characteristics ==
The length of the dam is 2 km. Many villages depend on the dam and the population of fish provides affordable sustenance for the area.

A nearby guest house is maintained by the government of Odisha. There is also a guest house where tourists can stay.
