= Haripur Gada =

- ହରିପୁର ଗଡ଼ (Odia)
- Ruins of Haripur Gada
- Interactive map of Haripur Gada
- 21.8036°N 86.7158°E
- Etymology: Named after Harihar Bhanj
- Cultures: Vaishnavism
- Location: Mayurbhanj district, Odisha
- Nearest city: Baripada

History
- Built: 14th century
- Built for: Capital of Mayurbhanj State
- Original use: Recidency of Bhanja dynasty

Site notes
- Elevation: 80 feet (24 m)
- Area: 25 acres (10 ha)
- Governing body: ASI
- Owner: Government of Odisha

Monument of National Importance
- Official name: Haripurgarh
- Type: Ruins of ancient fort
- Reference no.: N-OR-29
- Collection circle: Odisha

Haripur gada or Haripurgarh is the capital of the erstwhile Mayurbhanj State in India. It is located in Badsahi Block of the Mayurbhanj district, on the bank of the Budhabalanga river.

== Architectural description ==
Site plan of Jaripurgarh

=== Rasika Ray temple ===
Restored Rasik Ray Temple inside Haripur Gada

Haripur holds a prominent place in history; for instance, references to Haripurgarh can be found in the works of Vaishnava poets. It is associated with Sri Chaitanya, who passed through this place on his way to Puri. Raja Baidyanath Bhanja, a devout Vaishnava, erected a magnificent brick temple inside the garh in honor of his tutelary god, Rasika Raya. Structurally, the Rasika Ray temple stands as one of the few temples in Odisha built in the Bengal temple architectural style.
