= Karanjia =

- Town
- Location in Odisha, India Karanjia (India)
- Coordinates: 21.78°N 85.97°E
- Country: India
- State: Odisha
- District: Mayurbhanj
- Elevation: 389 m (1,276 ft)

Population (2011)
  - Total: 22,865

Languages
  - Official: Odia
- Time zone: UTC+5:30 (IST)
- PIN: 757037
- Telephone code: 06796
- Vehicle registration: OD-11
- Website: www.karanjianac.in

Karanjia is a city and an municipality in the eastern Indian state of Odisha, about 221 kilometres (134 mi) north of the state capital Bhubaneswar. It is the sub-divisional headquarter of Panchpir sub-division and a municipality in Mayurbhanj district. It is bounded on its southeast by Deo river which forms the natural district border for Mayurbhanj.

== Demographics ==
Historical population
Year	Pop.	±%
1981	14,910	—
1991	17,623	+18.2%
2001	21,441	+21.7%
2011	22,865	+6.6%
Source: Census of India

As of the 2011 Indian census Karanjia had a population of 22,865. Males constitute 49% of the population, females 51%. Karanjia has an average literacy rate of 83.35%, higher than the state average of 72.87%. Male literacy is 89.10%, and female literacy is 77.76%. 10.45% are under 6.

== Politics ==
Karanjia is part of Keonjhar (Lok Sabha constituency).

The current MLA is Basanti Hembram. She won the seat in State elections of 2019 as a candidate of Biju Janata Dal by defeating the candidate of Bharatiya Janata Party.

Karanjia is part of Keonjhar Loksabha constituency. The MP is Chandrani Murmu who won it by defeating the Bharatiya Janata Party candidate Ananta Nayak.
