= Belgadia Palace =

18th-century Victorian-era styled hill-top palace in Odisha, India

Coordinates: 21.943°N 86.724°E

The Belgadia Palace is an 18th-century Victorian-era styled hill-top palace located in Mayurbhanj district, Odisha, India.

== History ==
Maharani Sumitra Devi Bhanj Deo, who ruled the state from 1796 to 1810, gave the orders to construct the palace in 1804. Her descendants used the palace as a royal guest house. The present interiors were built during the rule of Maharajah Sriram Chandra Bhanj Deo (1882-1912), the most famous of the rulers in the Mayurbhanj region, preceded by Maharajah Krushna Chandra Bhanj Deo (1868-1882) and succeeded by Pratap Chandra Bhanj Deo (1928-1948). The overall construction is a melange of Victorian and Greek style of architecture, and replicated the style of the Buckingham Palace.

The Belgadia Palace is the residence of the current Maharajah Praveen Chandra Bhanjdeo (47th ruler of the Bhanj dynasty), the queen of Mayurbhanj Rashmi Rajyalaxmi Bhanj Deo from the royal family of Jaisalmer, the queen mother Bharati Rajya Lakshmi Devi (daughter of king Tribhuvan of Nepal), and daughters Mrinalika M Bhanj Deo and Akshita M Bhanj Deo

A portion of the palace has been converted into a heritage hotel since 2015.

== Location ==
The palace is located between the Simlipal and Baripada forest reserves of Orissa, which is part of the UNESCO World Network of Biosphere Reserves.
