= Mayurbhanj district =

- District of Odisha
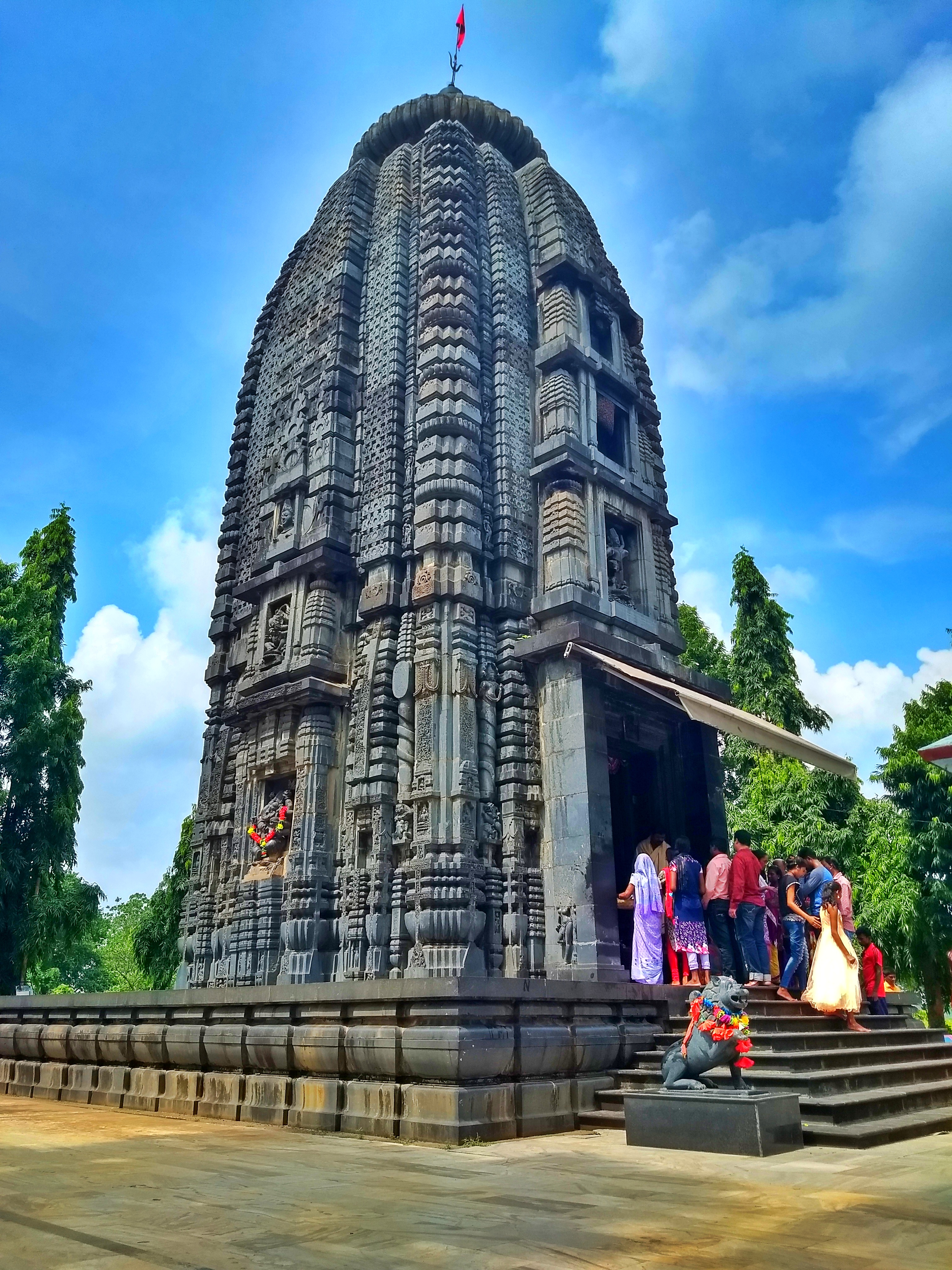
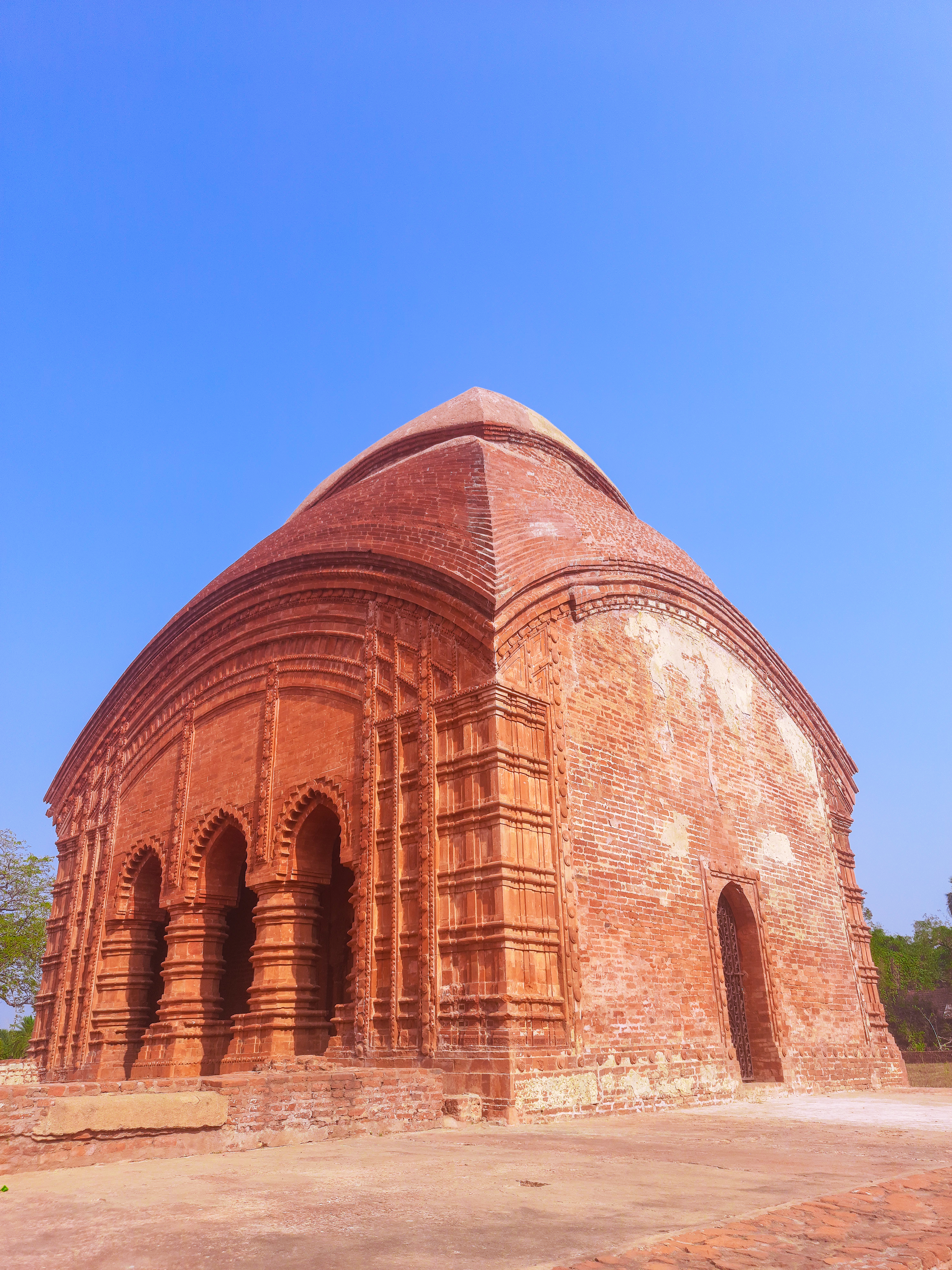
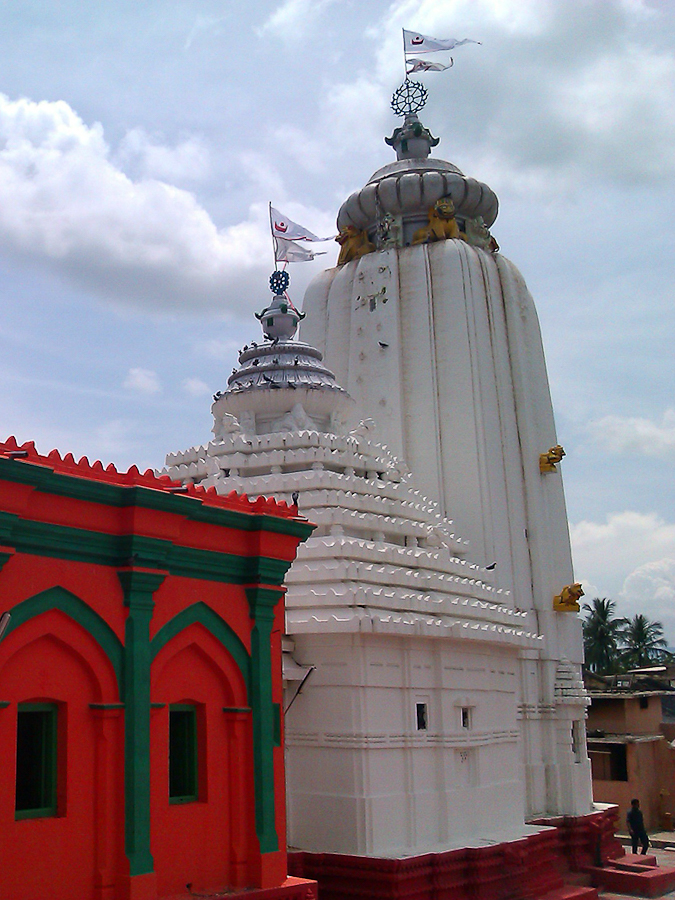
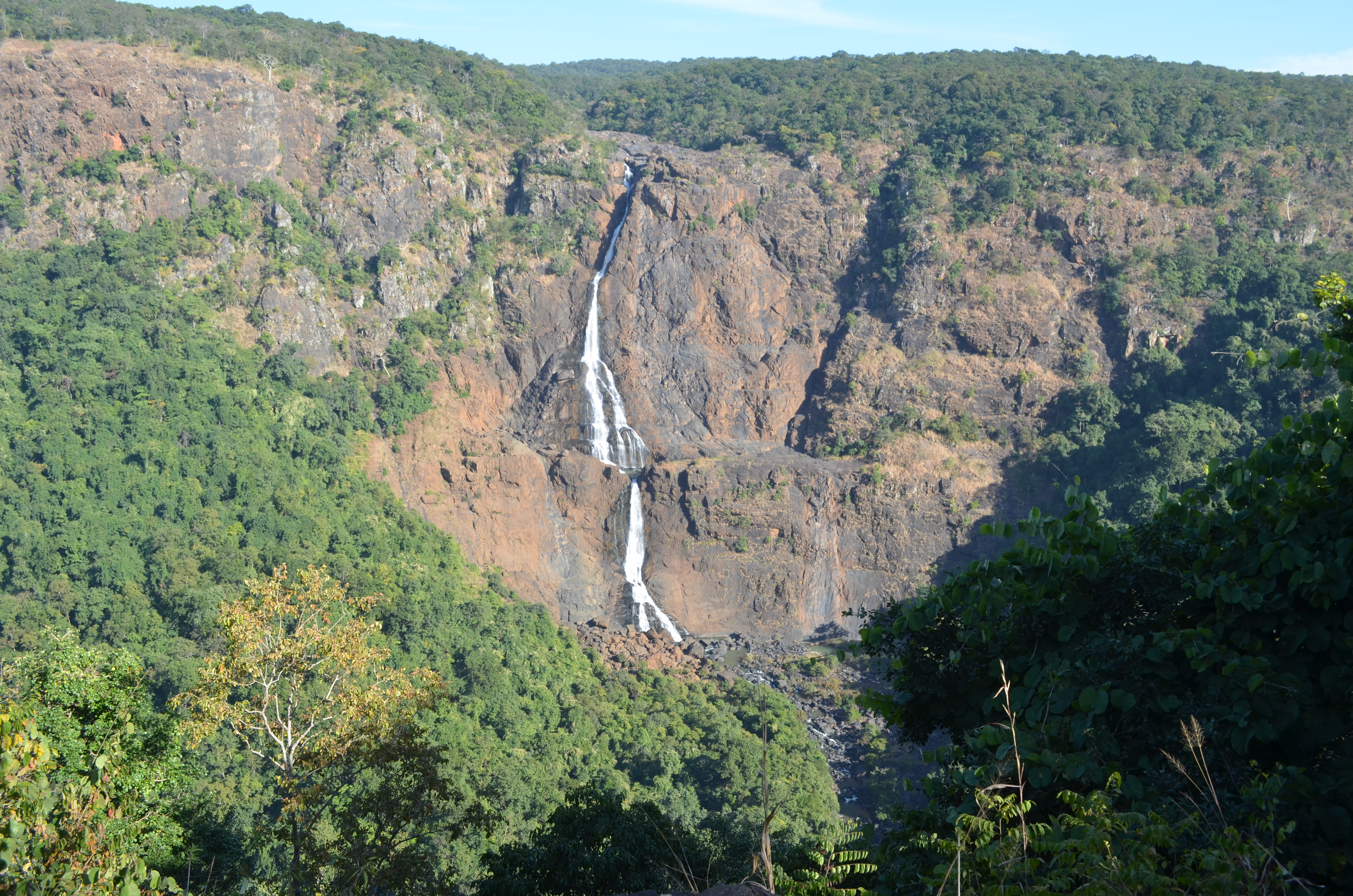
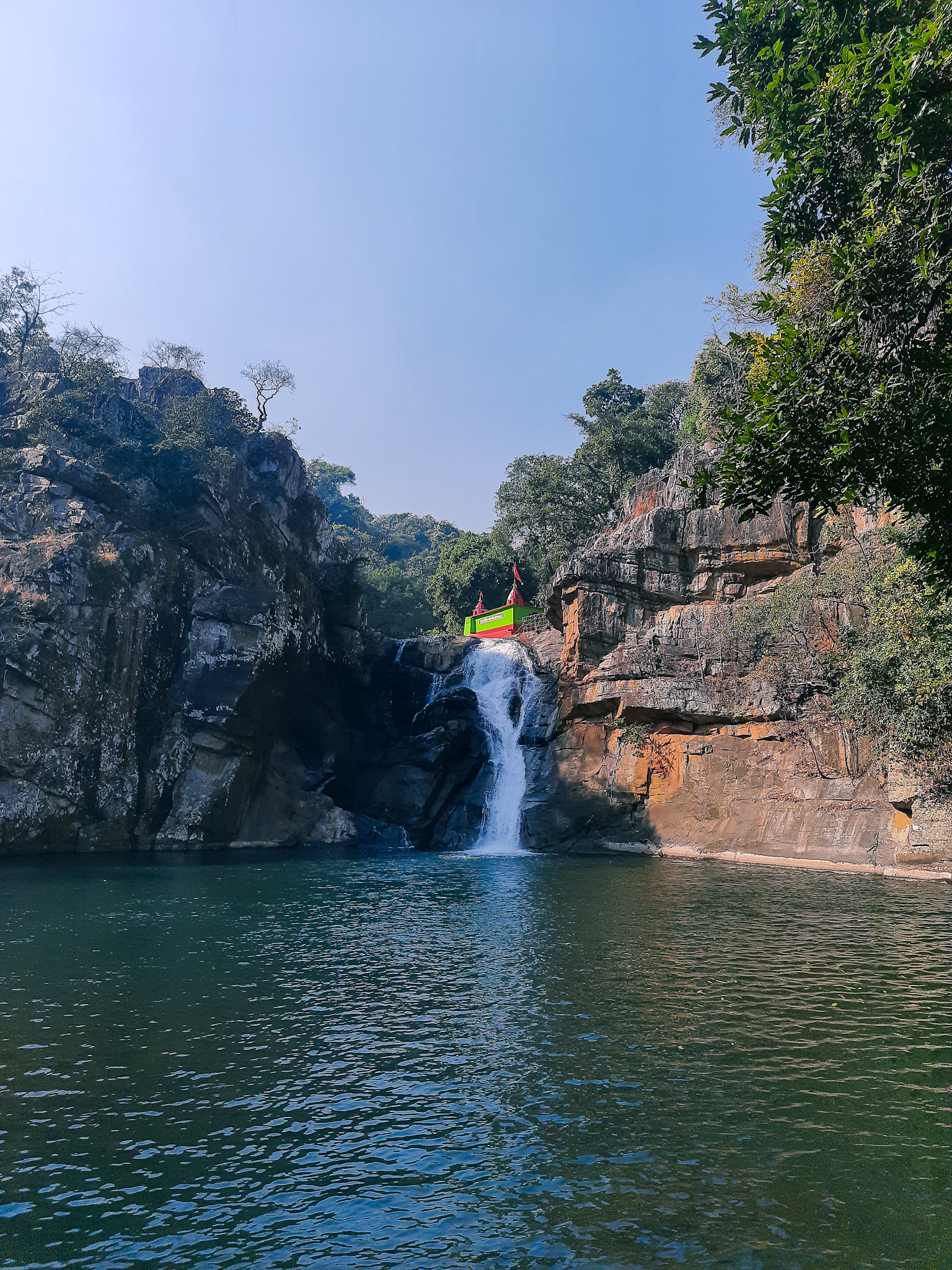
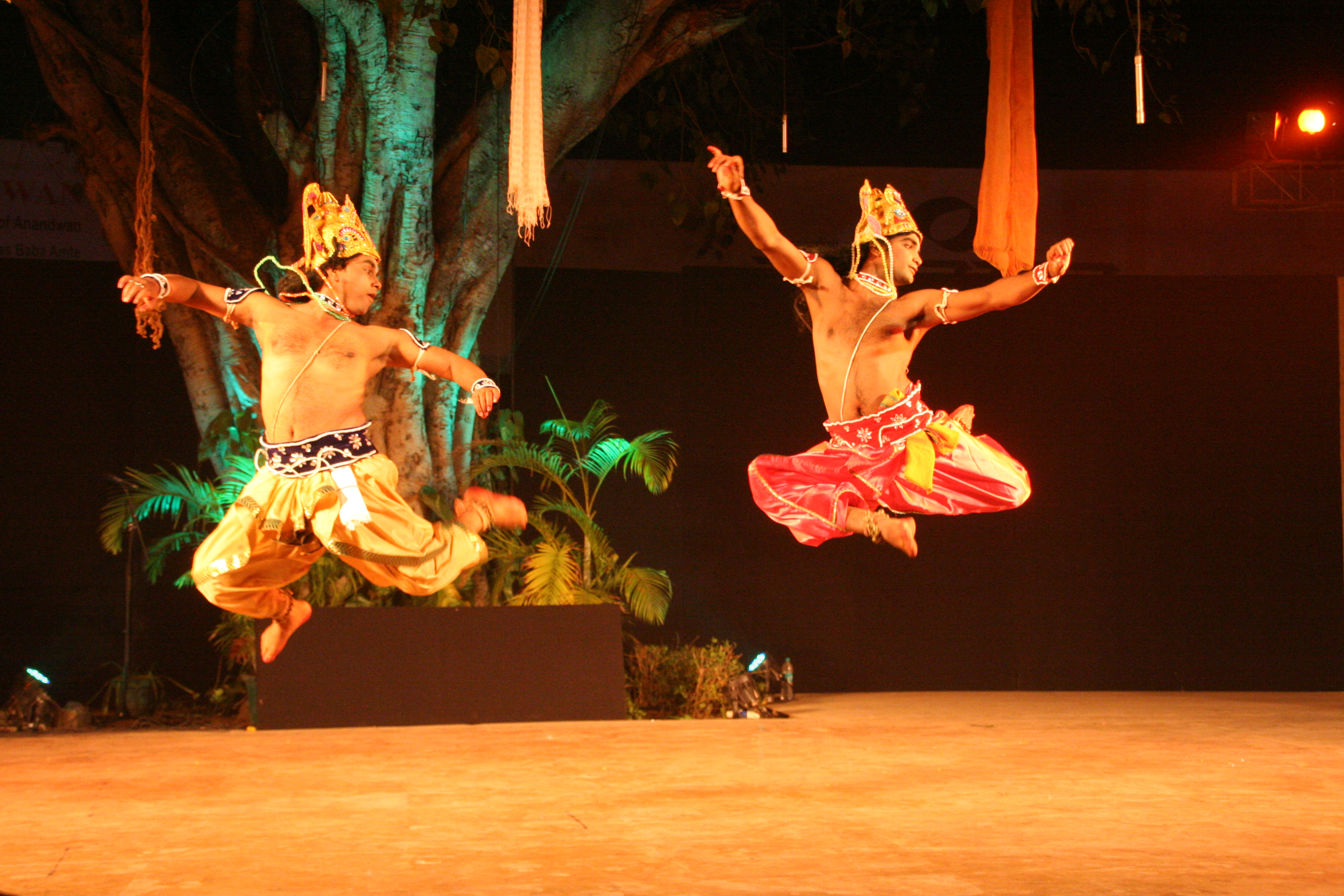
- Zigzag from Top-left: Kichakeshwari Temple in Khiching (first capital of erstwhile Mayurbhanj State), Rasika Ray Temple in Haripurgarh, Jagannath Temple in Baripada (second and third capital of the erstwhile state), Barehipani and Debakunda waterfall in Simlipal National Park, UNESCO recognised Mayurbhanj style Chhau dance
- Interactive map of Mayurbhanj district
- Coordinates: 21.933°N 86.733°E
- Country: India
- State: Odisha
- Division: Central Division
- Established (as a district): 1 January 1949
- Headquarter: Baripada
- District subdivisions: Baripada; Bamanghati; Panchpir; Kaptipada

Government
  - Member of Parliament: Naba Charan Majhi (BJP)
  - Collector & District Magistrate: Hema Kanta Say, IAS
  - Superintendent of Police: Varun Guntupalli, IPS

Area
  - Total: 10,418 km^{2} (4,022 sq mi)
  - Urban: 108 km^{2} (42 sq mi)
  - Rural: 10,309 km^{2} (3,980 sq mi)
  - Rank: 1st (in State); 57th (in India)
  - Forest: 4,458 km^{2} (1,721 sq mi)
- Elevation: 559.31 m (1,835.0 ft)
- Highest elevation (Khairiburu): 1,178 m (3,865 ft)

Population (2011)
  - Total: 2,519,738
  - Rank: 3rd (in State); 171st (in India)
  - Density: 241.86/km^{2} (626.42/sq mi)
  - Urban: 192,896 (7.66%)
  - Rural: 2,326,842 (92.34%)
- Demonym: Mayurbhanjia

Demographic
  - Sex ratio: 1,006 ♀/1000 ♂
  - Literacy rate: 63.17%
  - Scheduled Castes: 7.33% (184,682)
  - Scheduled Tribes: 58.72% (1,479,576)

Language
  - Official: Odia, English
  - Regional: Santali, Ho, Mundari, (Note: A significant number of Bhumij are recorded as speaking 'Bhumijali' in the census, which is classified as a dialect of Odia, although this could be another name for the Bhumij dialect of Mundari.) Kurmali
- Time zone: UTC+5:30 (IST)
- PIN: 757XXX
- UN/LOCODE: IN MYN
- Vehicle registration: OD-11x-xxxx
- Climate: Aw (Köppen)
- Precipitation: 1,648.2 mm (64.89 in)
- Lok Sabha: Mayurbhanj (Note: The Mayurbhanj Lok Sabha constituency covers seven assembly constituencies in the Mayurbhanj district, while the other two assembly constituencies of the district, namely Badsahi and Karanjia, are part of the Balasore and Kendujhar Lok Sabha constituencies, respectively.)
- Vidhan Sabha: 9 constituency: 026-Jashipur (ST) 027-Saraskana (ST) 028-Rairangpur (ST) 029-Bangiriposi (ST) 030-Karanjia (ST) 031-Udala (ST) 032-Badasahi (SC) 033-Baripada (ST) 034-Morada (None)
- Website: mayurbhanj.odisha.gov.in

Mayurbhanj district is one of the 30 districts of Odisha state in eastern India and the largest in the state by area, nearly equivalent to Tripura. The district's headquarters is located in Baripada, with other major towns including Rairangpur, Karanjia, and Udala. As of 2011, Mayurbhanj ranks as the third-most populous district in Odisha, following Ganjam and Cuttack. The district also known for the Similipal National park.

== Etymology ==
The district owes its name to two medieval ruling dynasties, Mayura and Bhanja. It is believed that the native ruling Bhanja dynasty underwent socio-cultural exchange with the Mayura dynasty during their shifting of capital, adopting their name alongside Bhanja and renaming the state to Mayurbhanj. The peacock motif was later embraced by the Bhanjas and featured on the coat of arms of Mayurbhanj. Although the previous name of the territory remains uncertain, it was referred to as Khijjinga mandala and colloquially Bhanjabhumi, signifying the land of Bhanja. In popular culture, it is commonly termed Mayura (peacock in Odia), with Bhanja as the reigning dynasty. The name of Mayurbhanj state is noted as Mohurbunge, Morebunge, and Morbhanj in many British India records.

== History ==
=== Prehistory ===
Archeological sites of Mayurbhanj district

Paleolithic Sites
Mesolithic Sites
Neolithic Sites
Ground Polished Stone Celt Sites
Other stone tool Sites
Shouldered Celt Sites
Other important Sites

The archaeological evidence suggest that human settlements in the Mayurbhanj district date back to the Lower Paleolithic era of the Stone Age. These settlements thrived alongside the Budhabalanga River and its tributaries. The presence of a consistent water source attracted wildlife from the Similipal forest, facilitating the hunting of smaller animals from the safety of caves by supporting early human inhabitants. The region's thin forest cover also provided edible roots and fruits.

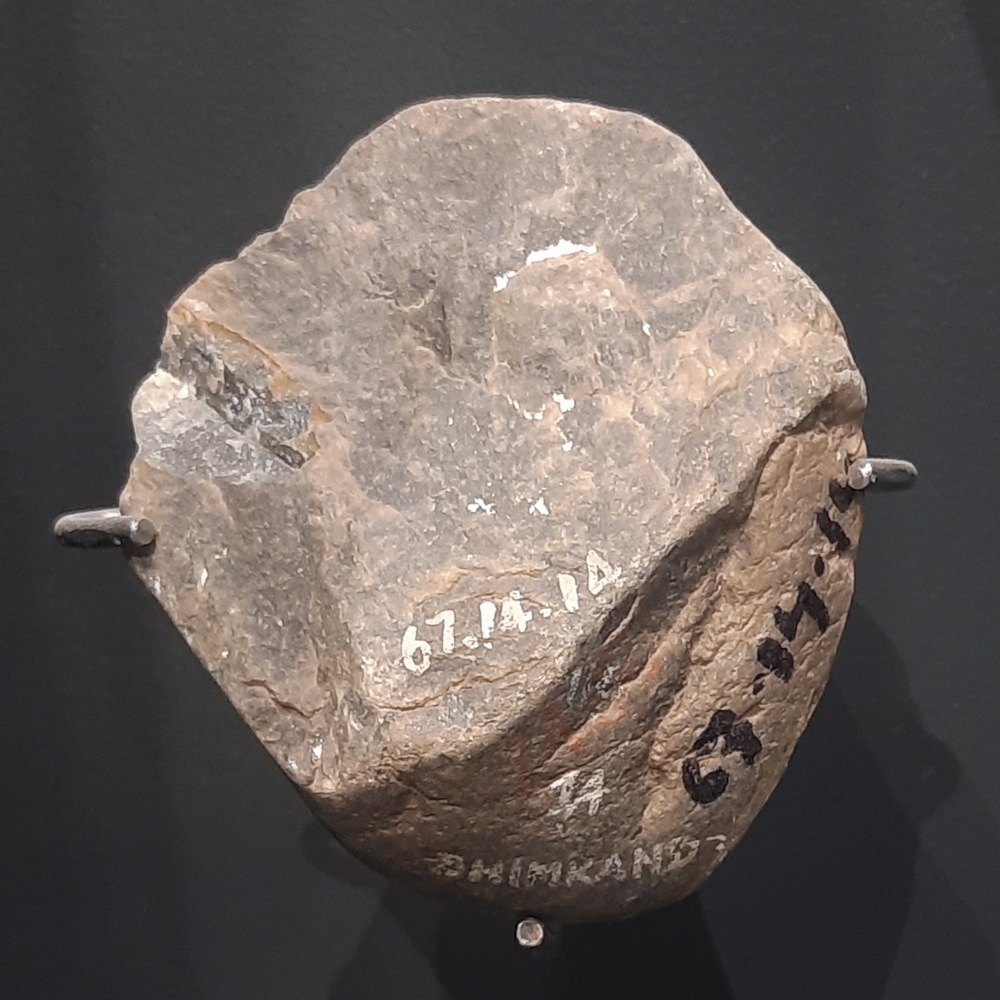
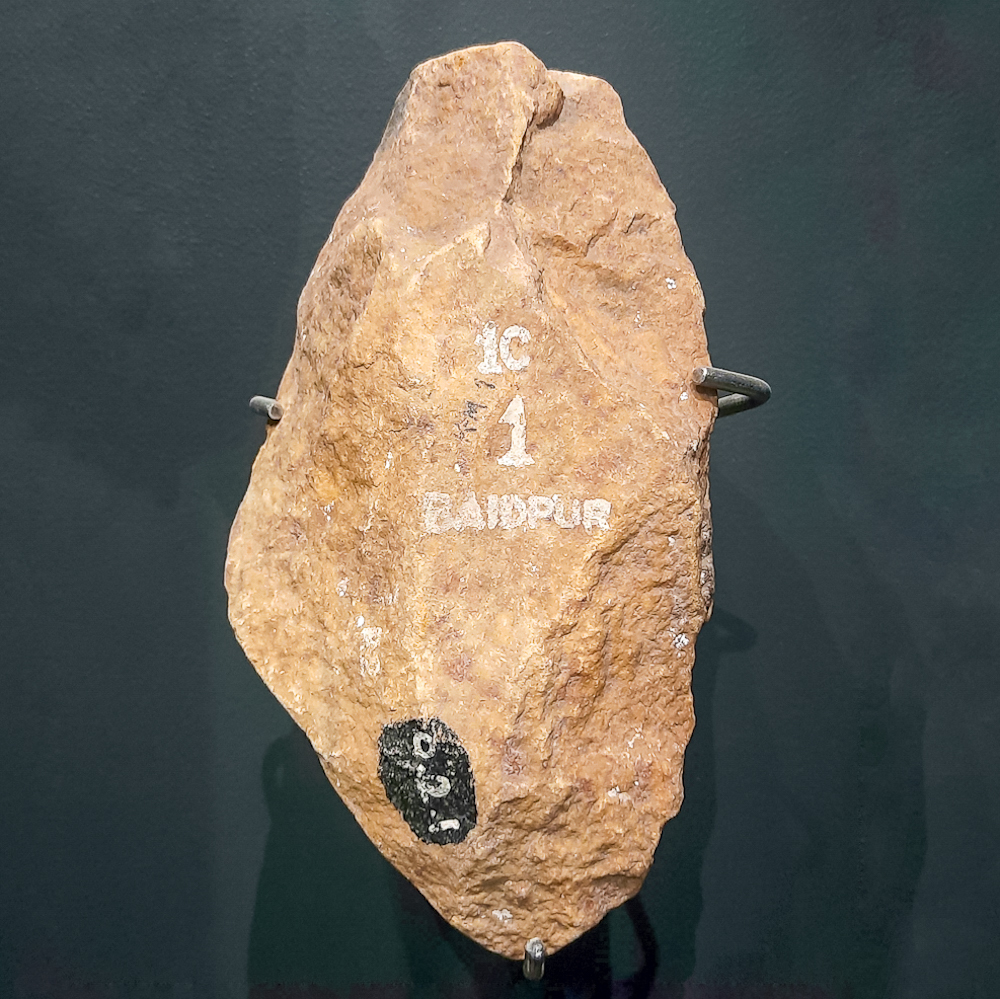
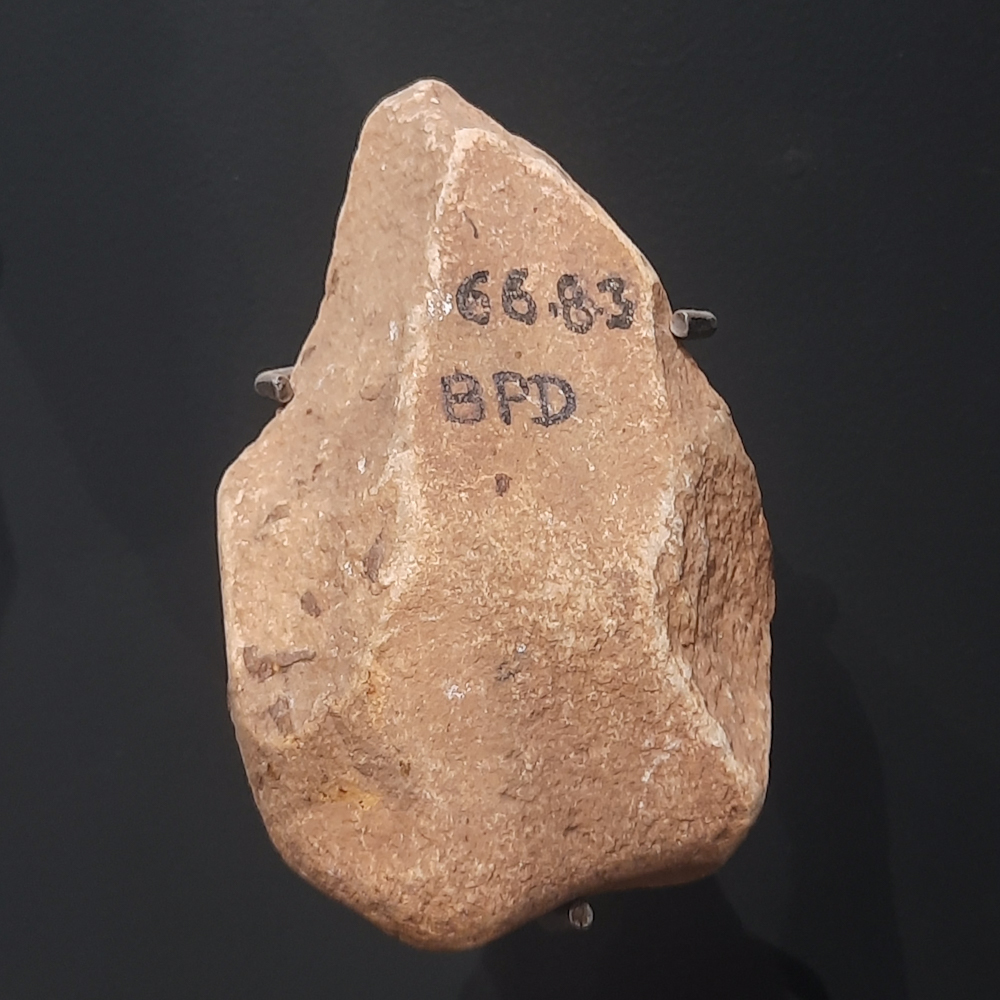
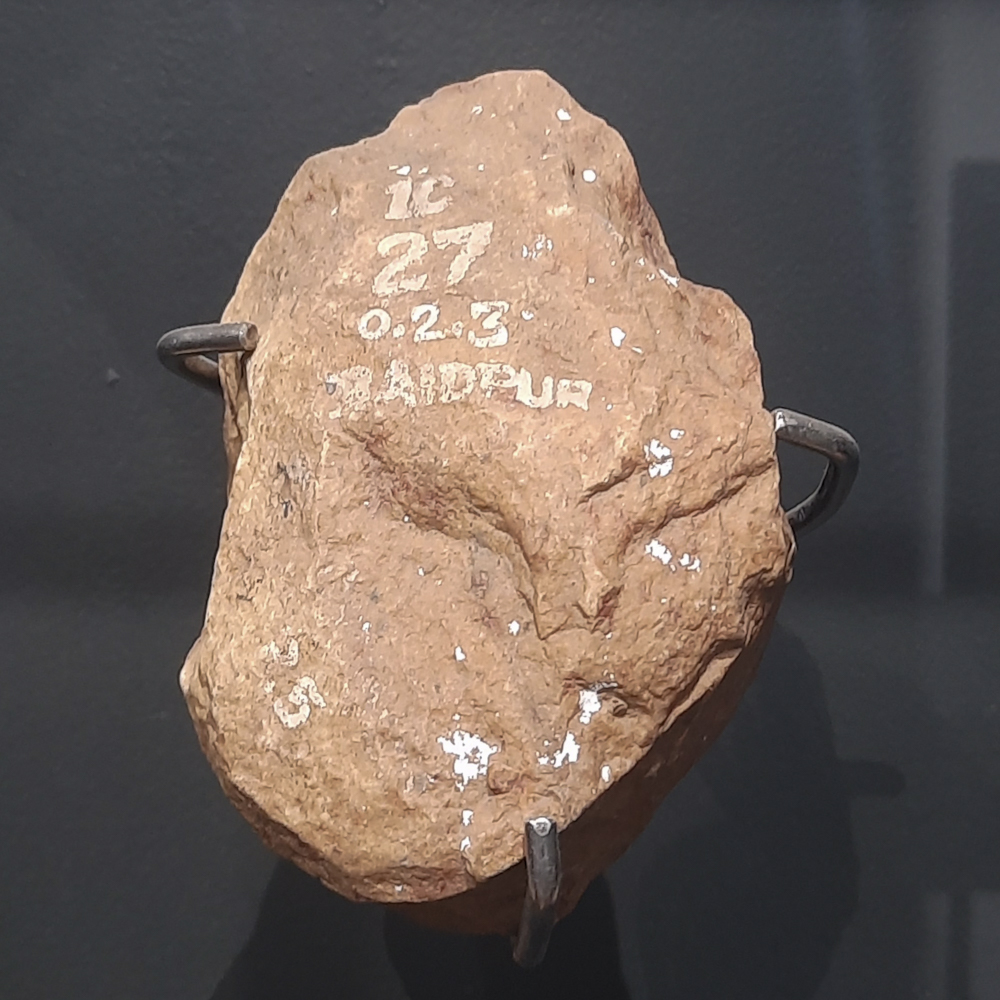
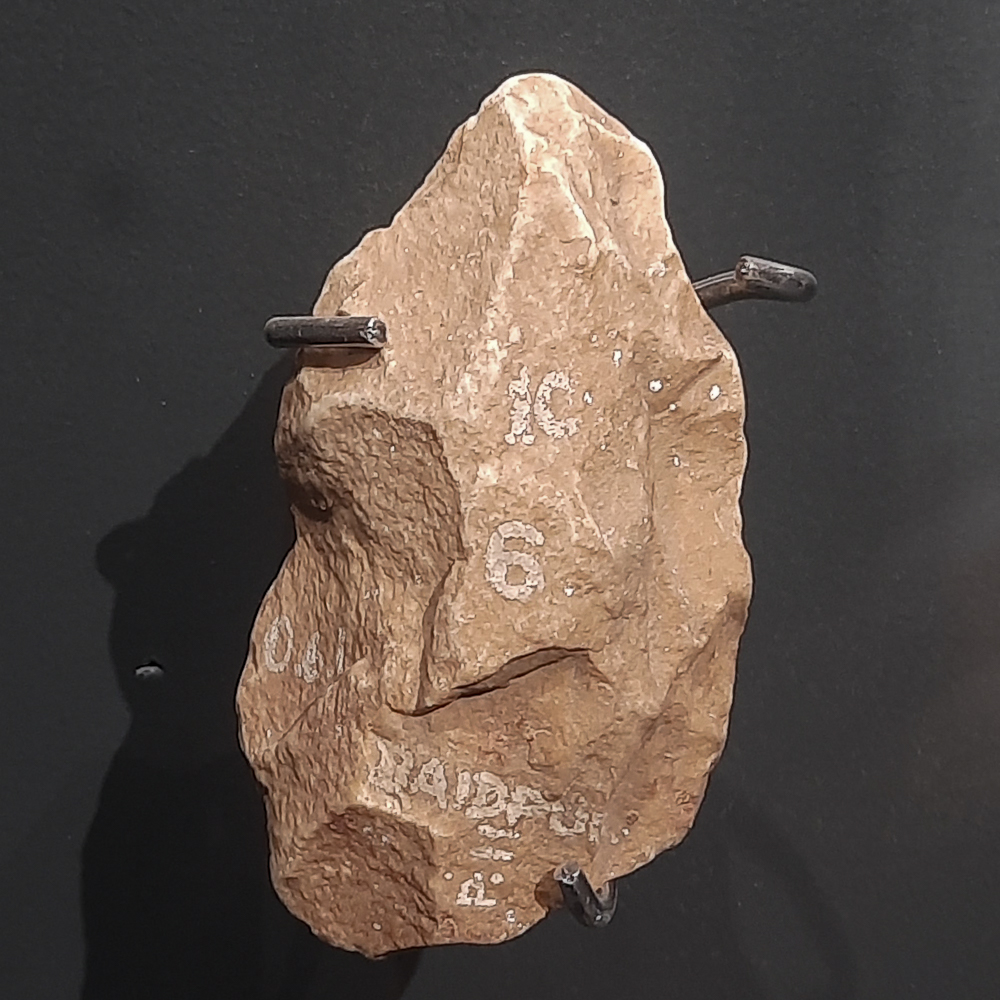
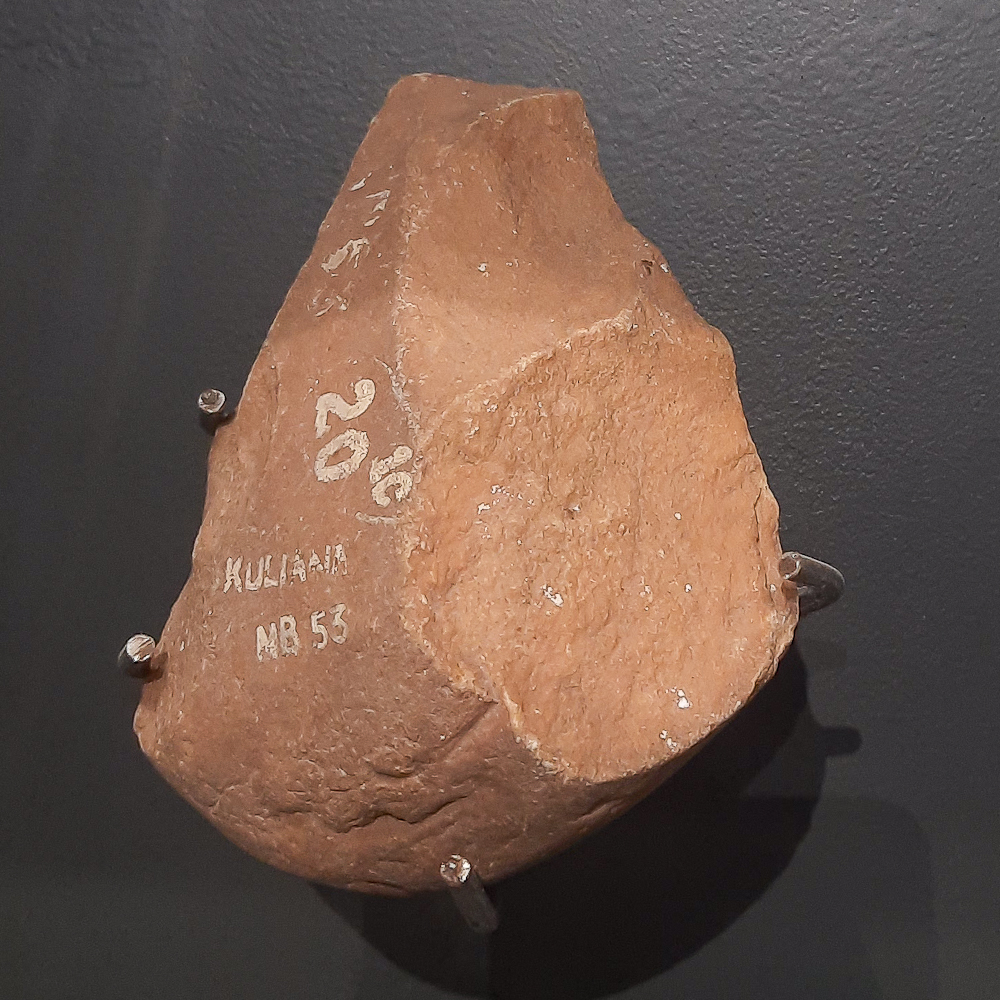
Some Lower Paleolithic stone tools from Mayurbhanj district.

The tools used by these early settlers were quite basic, resembling split pebbles with minimal flaking, similar to those found in Paleolithic industries in Africa. These tools evolved over time to include handaxes, cleavers, scrapers, knives, rostrocarinates, and points, varying in complexity, shape, and size. Stratigraphy does not provide a means to categorize them into distinct groups for understanding their technical development. Typo-technological analysis suggests the presence of two specific tool types with manufacturing techniques akin to European Abbevilian, Acheulian, and Clactonian industries.

=== Mediaeval to modern history ===
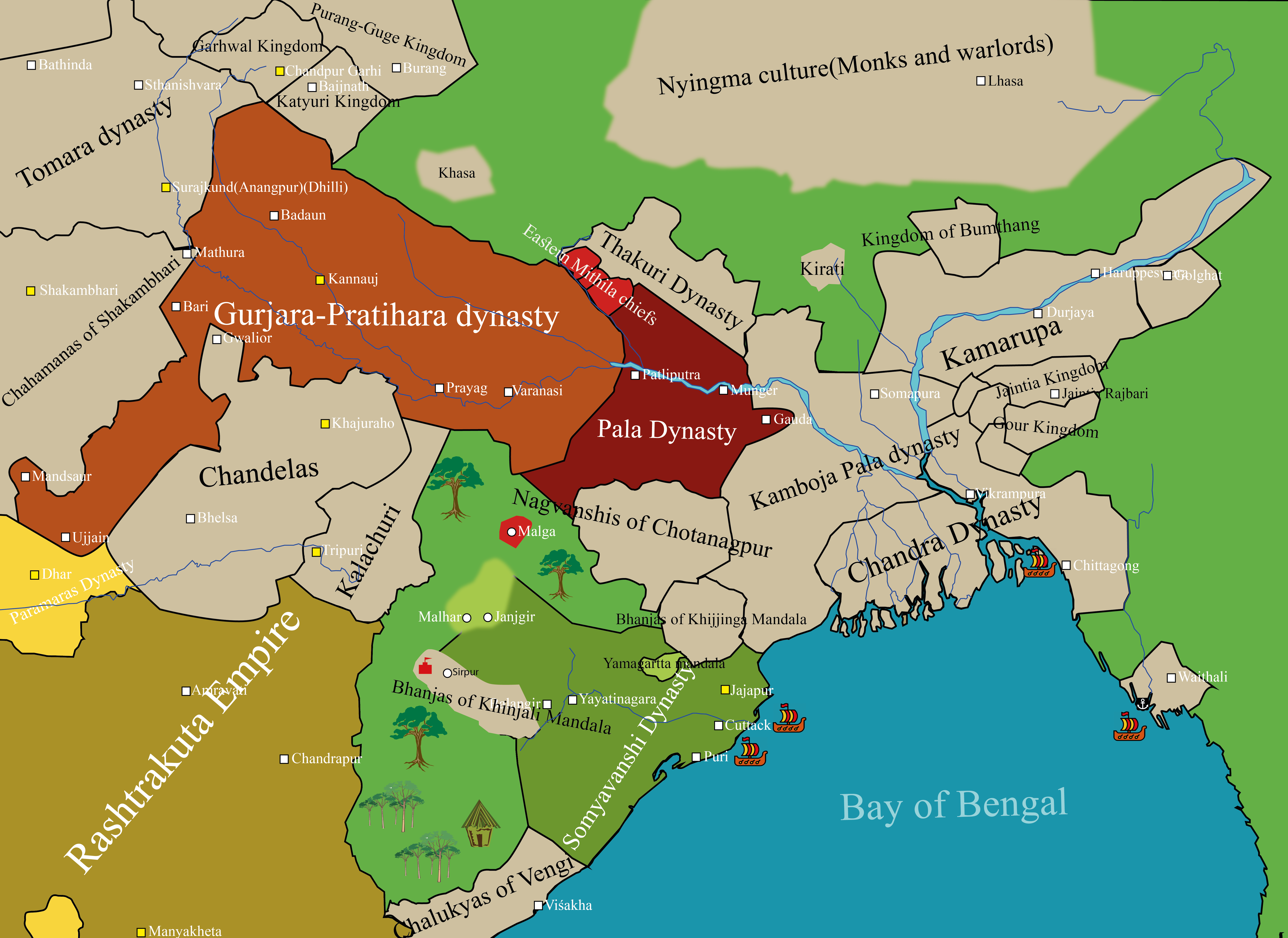
Khijjinga mandala of the Bhanja dynasty and neighbouring polities in c. 10th century (approximate territorial reconstruction).

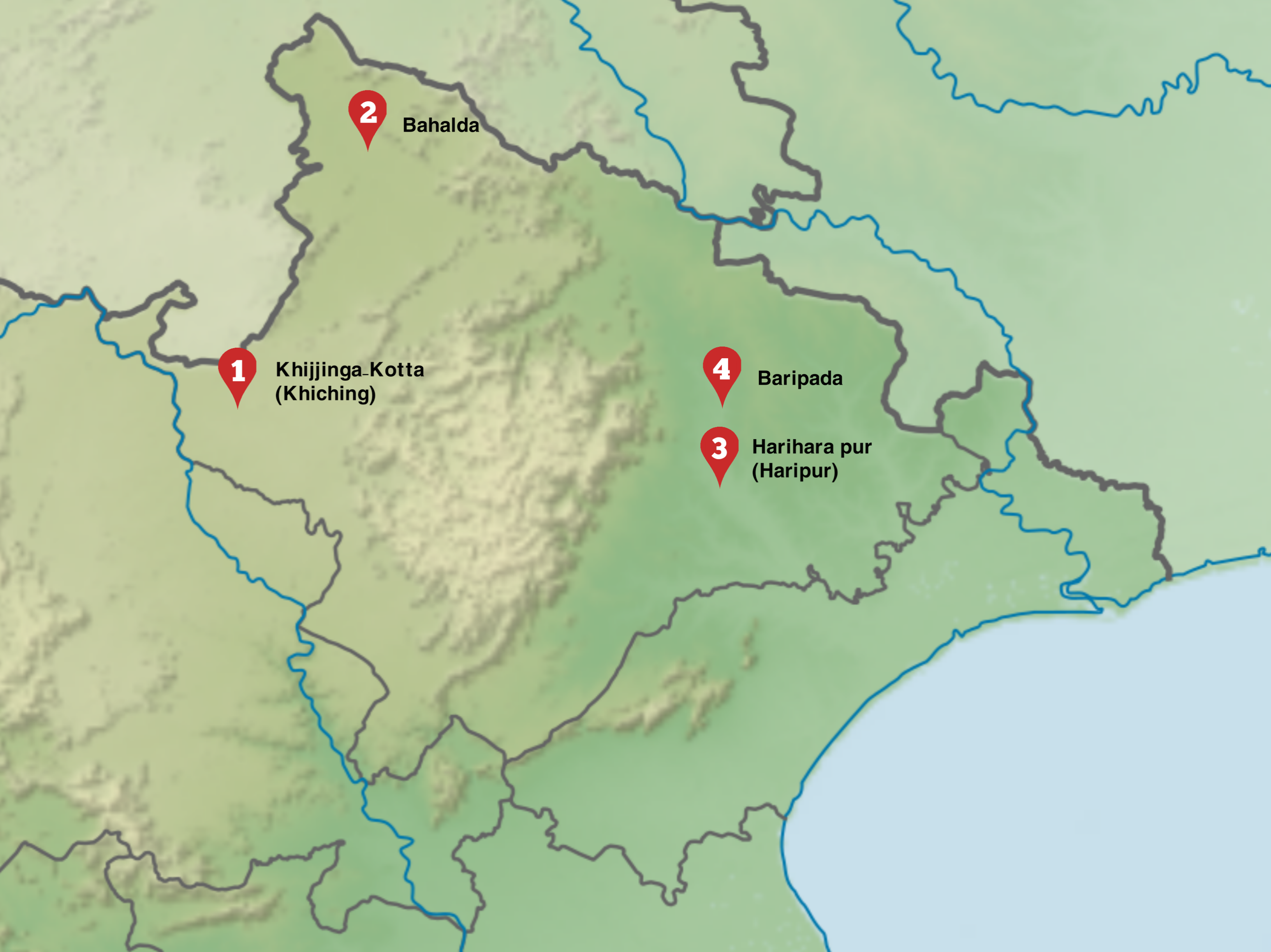
Successive capitals of Mayurbhanj: Khiching (~9th c.), Bahalda (13th c.)*, Haripur (14th c.), and Baripada (18th c.).

The Bhanja family, which ruled Mayurbhanj State, holds a significant place in the district's history. The Bhanjas of Khijjinga mandala governed the western region of the present-day Mayurbhanj district, including parts of Kendujhar and West Singhbhum districts, with their headquarters at Khiching after the fall of the Buddhist Bhauma-Kara dynasty. The progenitor of present-day Bhanjas of Khijjinga mandala divided the territory into two segments, each led by one ruler, effectively forming two full-fledged states. One relocated the capital from Khiching to Haripur and subsequently renamed the territory as Mayurbhanj State, while the other moved it to Kendujhargarh and named it Keonjhar State after Delhi Sultanate Feroz Shah Tughlaq plundered the kingdom during his invasion of Odisha in 1361 CE, when he marched through Manbhum, Singhbhum, and Mayurbhanj.

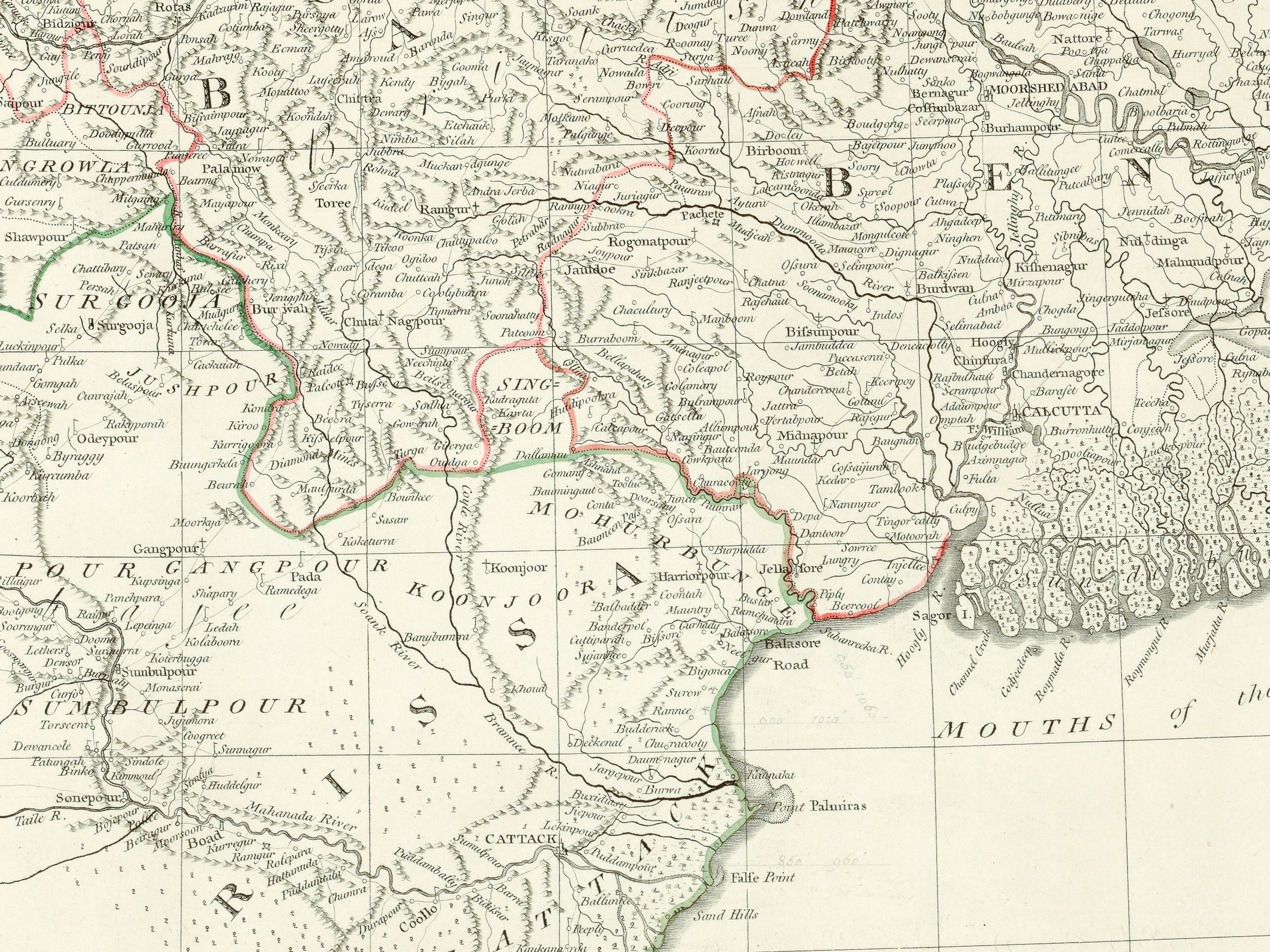
The land of Bhanjas during Mughal rule, as depicted in the map by Rennell, 1788.

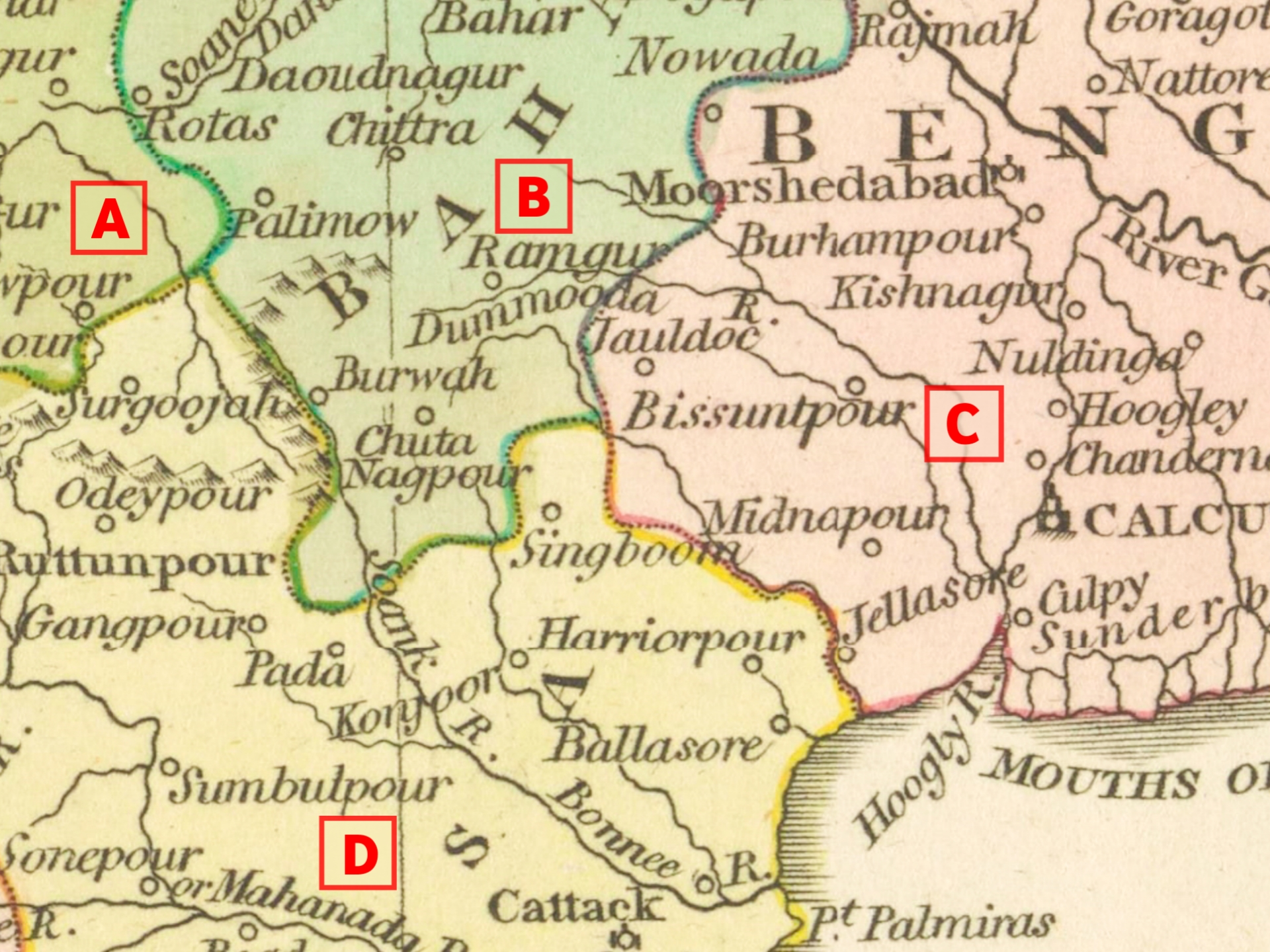
A Illahabad Subah B Bihar Subah C Bengal Subah D Odisha Subah

The land of Bhanjas in Odisha Subah during Akbar's reign (c. 16th century), as depicted in the map by Wilkinson, 1815.

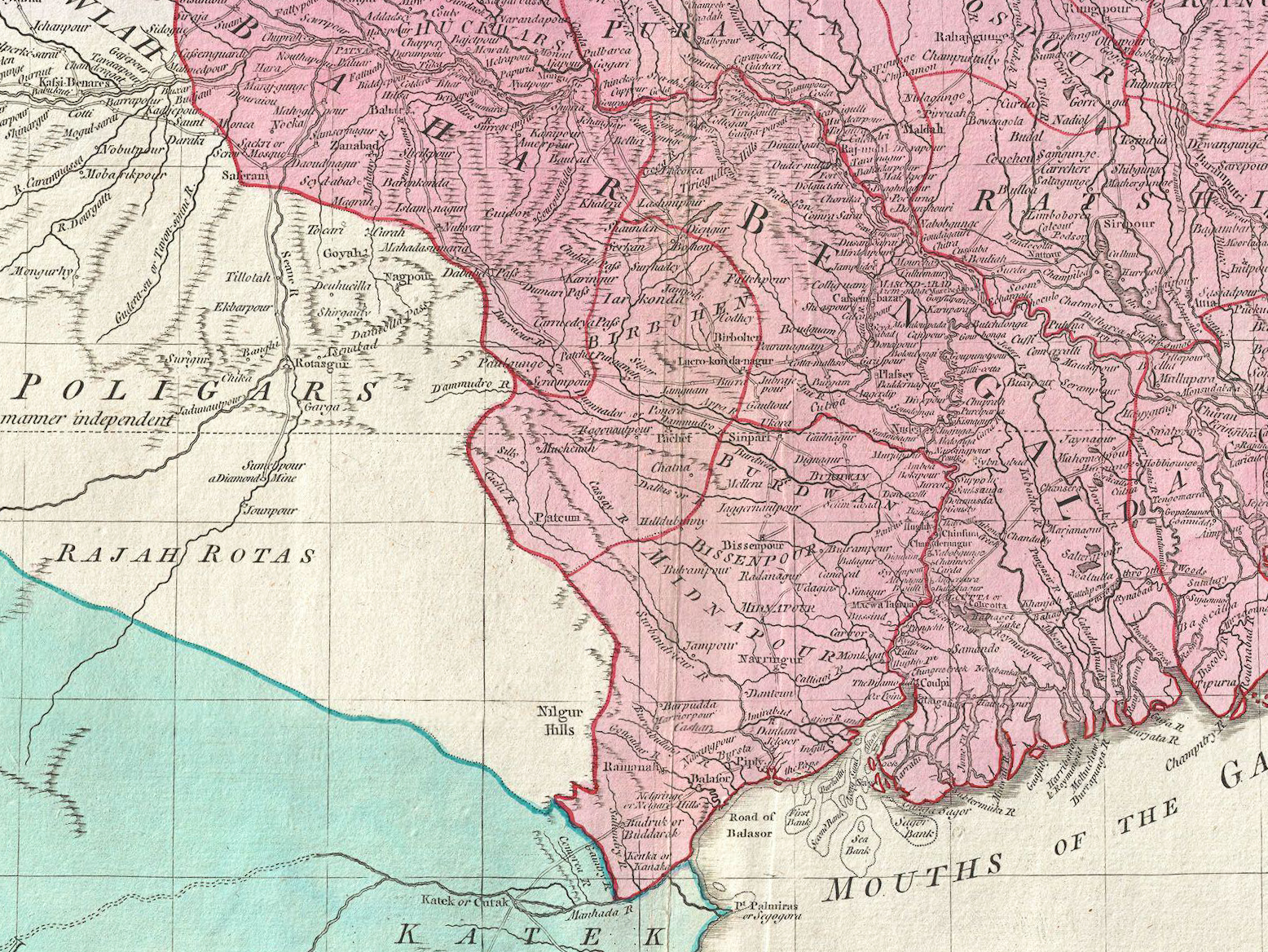
Thomas Jefferys's 1768 map showing the sway of Maratha and Mughal over Mayurbhanj territory. (Green: Maratha domination, Pink: Mughal domination)

In 1508, the state came under Mughal rule. During Mughal conquest from 1592 to 1751, Mayurbhanj was an extensive domain that comprised 12 Zamindari, 42 kila in total, and, according to Raja Man Singh, 18 forts within the state, including Bhanjbhum, Mantri, Hariharapur, Dewalia, Purunia, Karkachua, Bamanghati, and Sarhonda. The state also held sway over several surrounding Zamindari Estates, including Nilgiri, Porahat, Saraikela, Kharsawan, Barabhum, Patharhai, Narsinhpur, Dipa Kiarchand, Jhamirapal, Jamkunda, Chargarh, Talmunda, Tamar, and Birkul in Medinipur, during the early period of Mughal rule. All of these territories encompassed present-day Kendujhar, Balasore, Singhbhum, and large parts of the undivided Midnapore districts. Raja Krushna Chandra Bhanja took advantage of the disturbed conditions around the last years of Shah Jahan and enlarged his territory to the coast of the Bay of Bengal, covering the area from Jaleswar to Bhadrak. He was however defeated and executed by Khan-e-Dauran, the general of Emperor Aurangzeb.

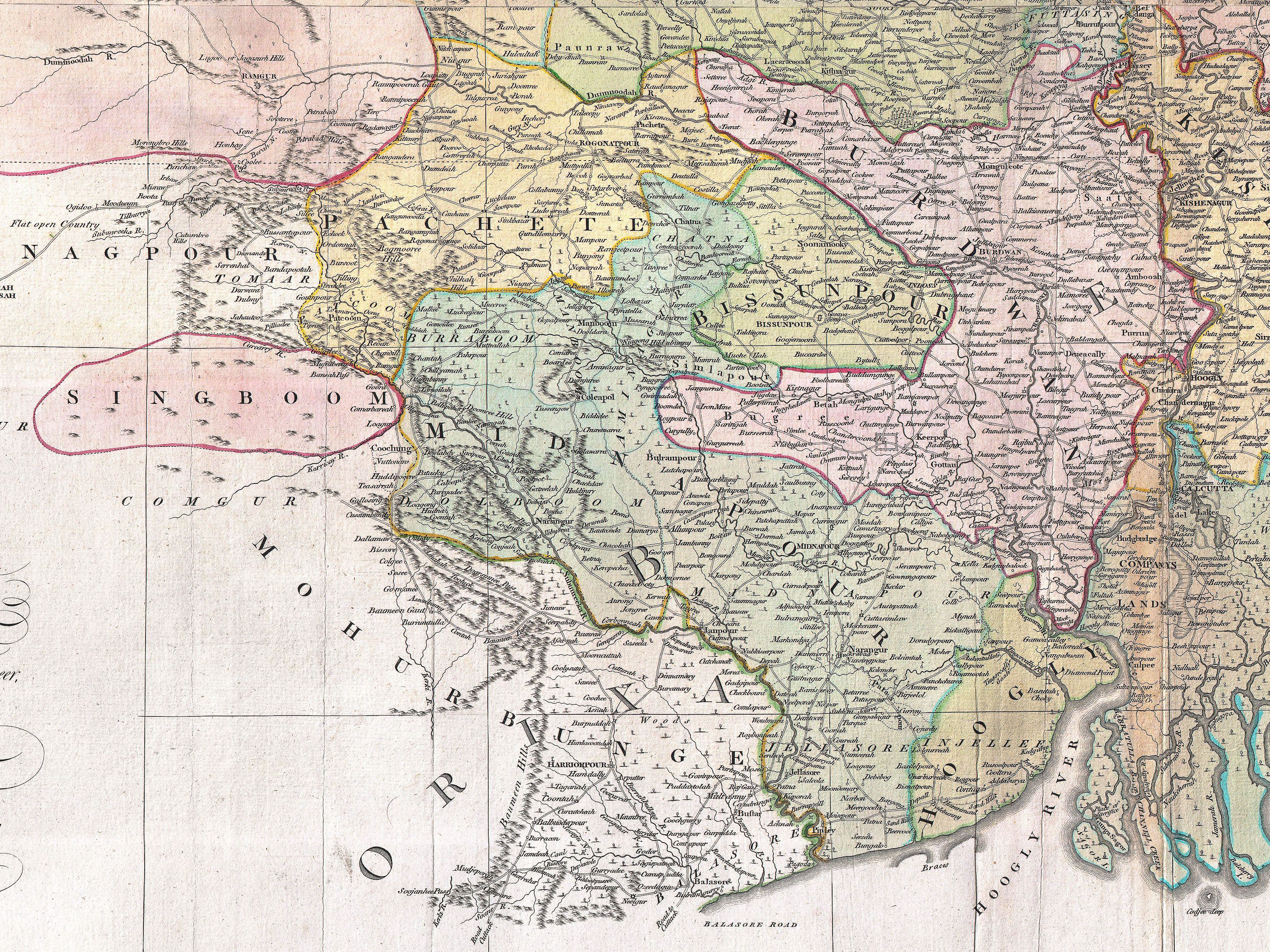
The polities of lower Bengal during the early colonial era, as depicted in the map by Rennell, 1776.

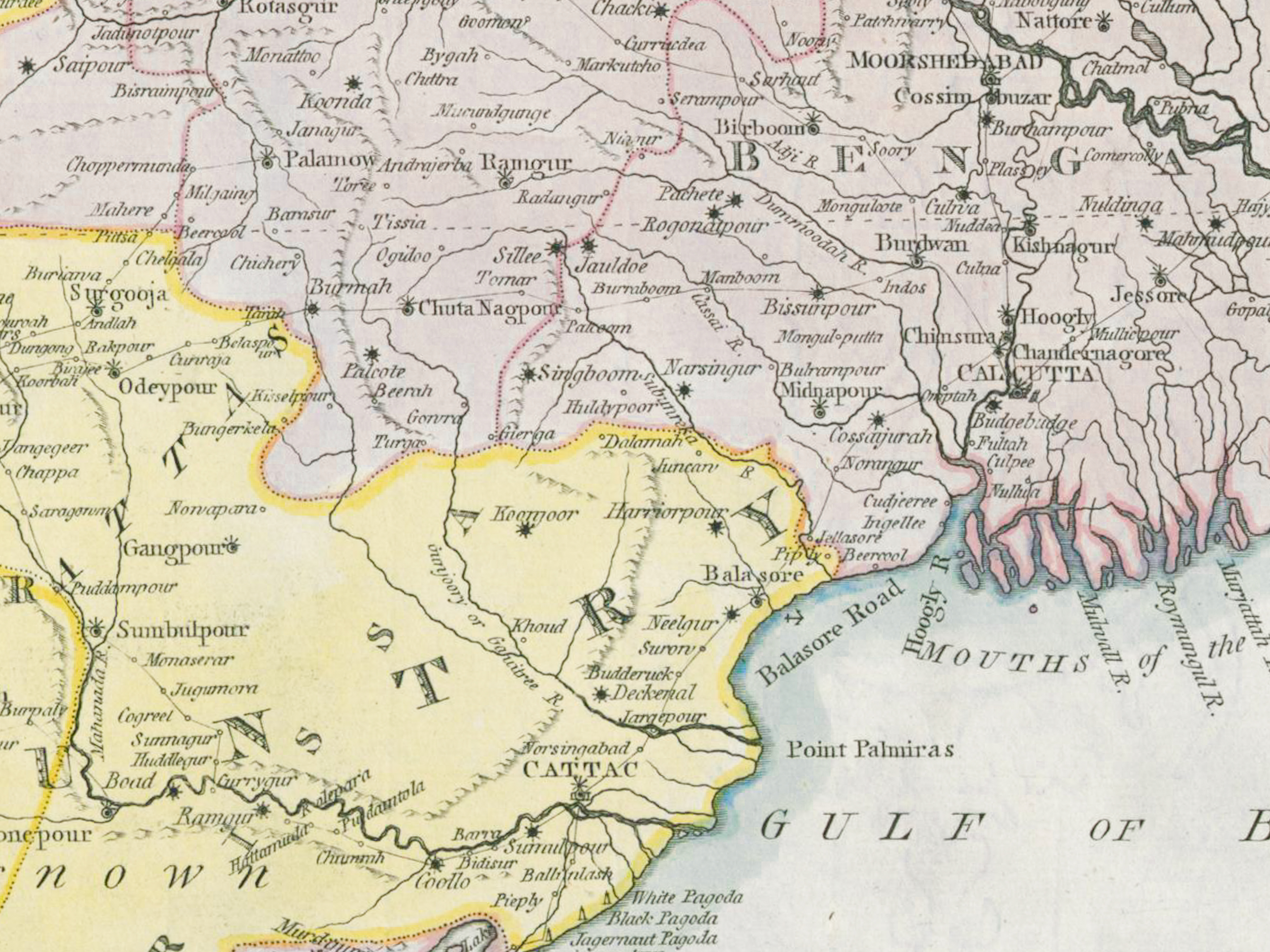
Mayurbhanj under Maratha rule, as depicted in the map by Luffman, 1804. (Yellow: Maratha domination, Pink: British domination)

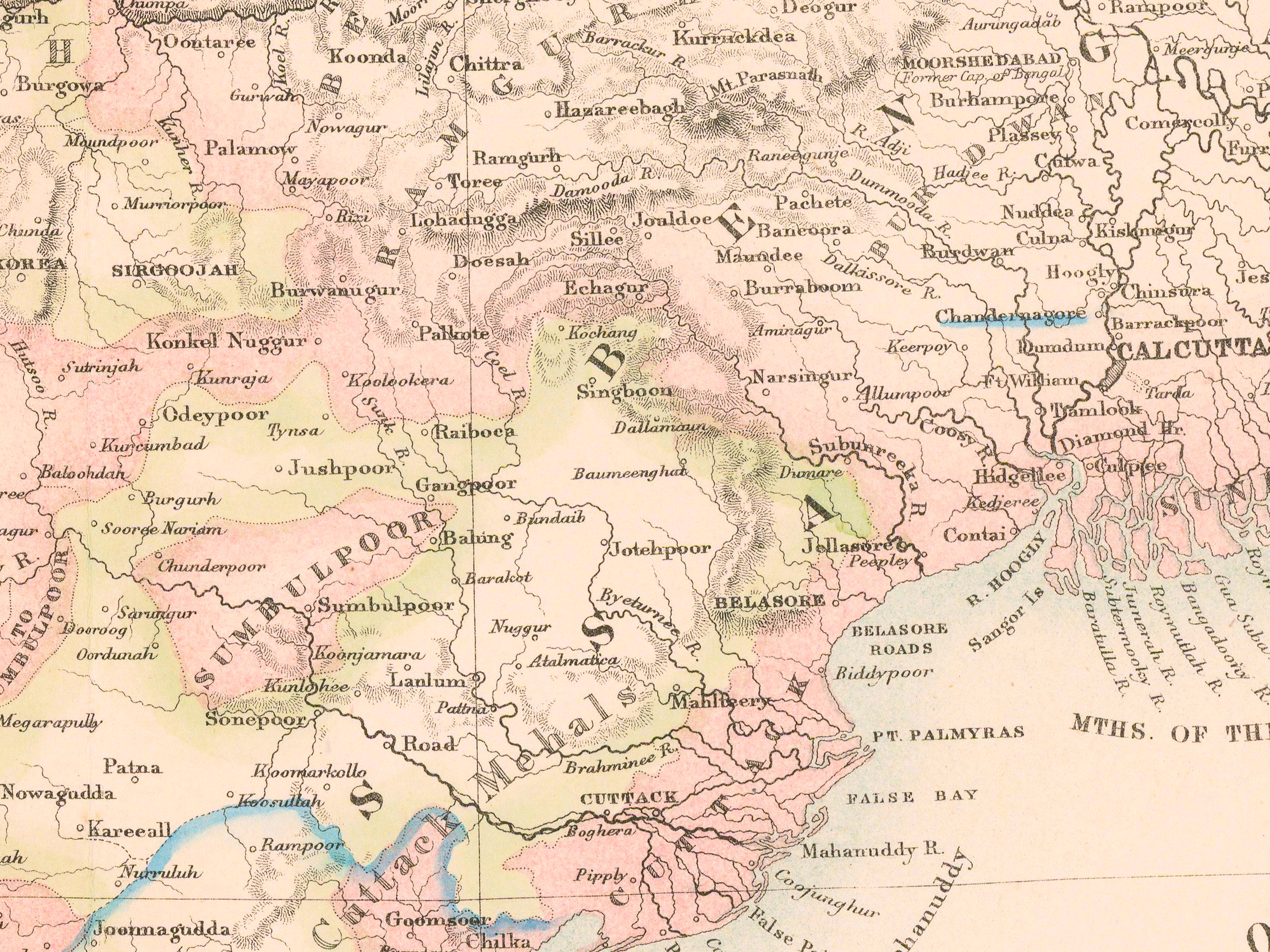
Extent of Mayurbhanj and other Cuttack Mahals states of Odisha in the early-19th century—shortly before the British territorial reorganization, as depicted in the map by Johnson, c. 1860. (Green: Native independent/protectorate states, Pink: British territories)

In 1751, it came under Maratha rule. During the expansion of the Maratha Empire, the state lost most of its territories along the coast as well as the Nilgiri State. The loss of the sea ports along the Balasore coast severely affected the state finances. It was around this time that the capital was shifted to Baripada. The river Subarnarekha served as the natural border between Mughal-controlled Bengal and Maratha-controlled Odisha after a number of conflicts between 1742 and 1751. In 1803, the state submitted to the British who had conquered coastal Odisha and the state was recognised as a feudatory state – a position midway between a princely state and a Zamindari. At that time, the state lost some zamindaris, including two northeastern bordering territories: Gopiballavpur and Nayagram. However, the state remained semi-independent and acted as a buffer state between Maratha and British rule by maintaining friendly relations with British authorities. The left-out westernmost territory of the Mayurbhanj state, stretching up to the Porahat estate, retained its autonomy during both Mughal and Maratha invasions. It was primarily inhabited by the Ho (Larka Kol, the fighting Kol), a significant aboriginal group, who asserted their dominance over the indigenous Bhuiyan tribe during their settlement period (c. 8th – c. 12th century). Though the state had de jure rights over that territory, de facto control was held by the Porahat estate due to geography and demographic nature, especially after the relocation of the state capital from Khiching to Haripur. In 1820, the Porahat estate acknowledged British authority, eventually leading to the gradual annexation of these left-out independent areas into the British-administered Singhbhum district following a series of conflicts between Kol and British army. In the 1830s, further territorial concessions were made to the British when large parts of Bamanghati area, such as Thai, Bharbharia, Anla, Lalgarh, Khuchung (now in Saraikela Kharsawan district), and Haladipokhari (now in East Singhbhum district) were handed over to the British administrated Singhbhum district as a consequence of persistent Kol uprisings. However, by the end of the 19th century, only two zamindaris, Bamanghati and Kaptipada, had merged with the state. Thereafter, there were no further changes to the territorial boundaries. In 1912, the Mayurbhanj state became part of the Bihar and Orissa Province of British India as a feudatory state. In 1936, with the partition of the province, it became a part of Orissa Province.

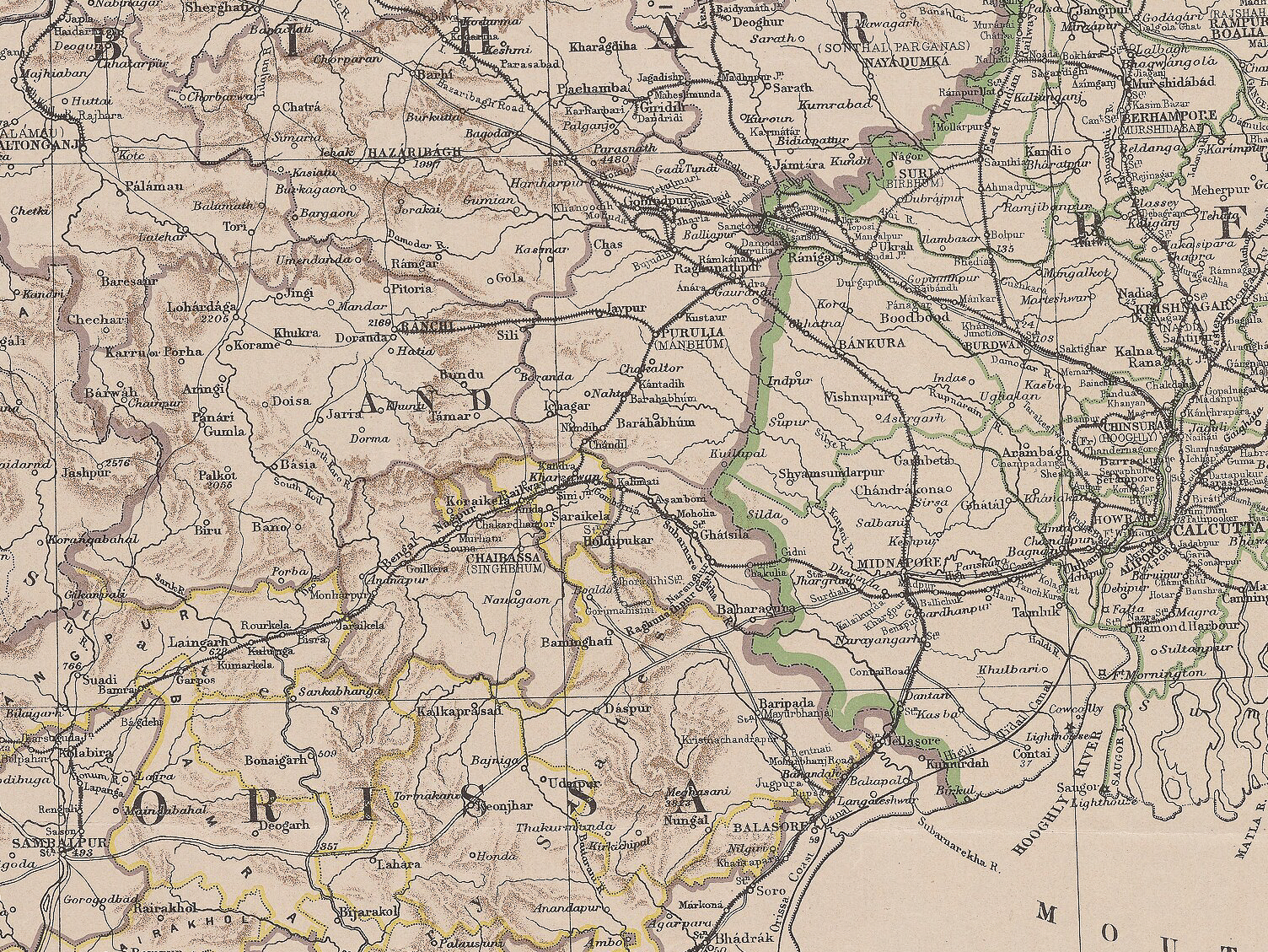
Mayurbhanj State under Bihar and Orissa Province of Bengal Presidency, 1912.

The state was modernised during the short reign of Maharaja Sriram Chandra Bhanj Deo in the early 20th century, a legacy continued by his succeeding rulers Purna Chandra Bhanj Deo and Pratap Chandra Bhanj Deo till the merger of the state with Odisha. During Sriram Chandra's reign, major infrastructure and administrative developments took place, including the construction of the narrow-gauge railway from Rupsa to Baripada and from Gorumahisani mines to Jamshedpur. The circular road connecting four sub-divisional headquarters was also built, which is now part of SH-19, SH-49 and NH-18. Similarly, Maharaja established the Baripada Municipality and Udala Sub-divisional headquarters for effective governance. In a notable judgement during his reign, the Calcutta High Court held that the Mayurbhanj State as well as all other feudatory states of Odisha were practically not parts of British India, thus elevating them to the status of full princely states. Mayurbhanj was the largest and most populous of all princely states in Odisha and the Maharaja enjoyed a salute of 9 guns.

=== Merger of the state ===
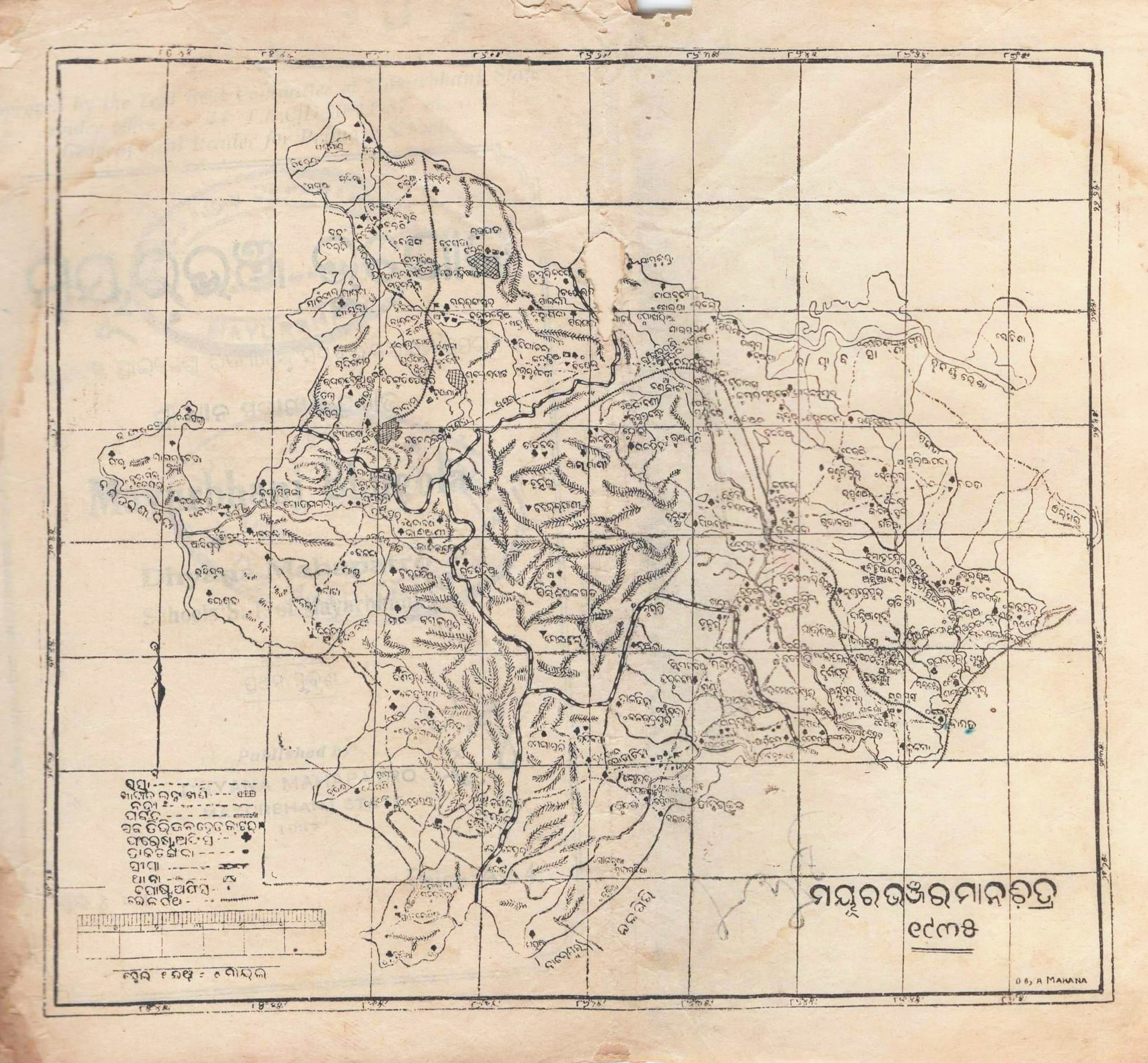
Mayurbhanj state map 1935.

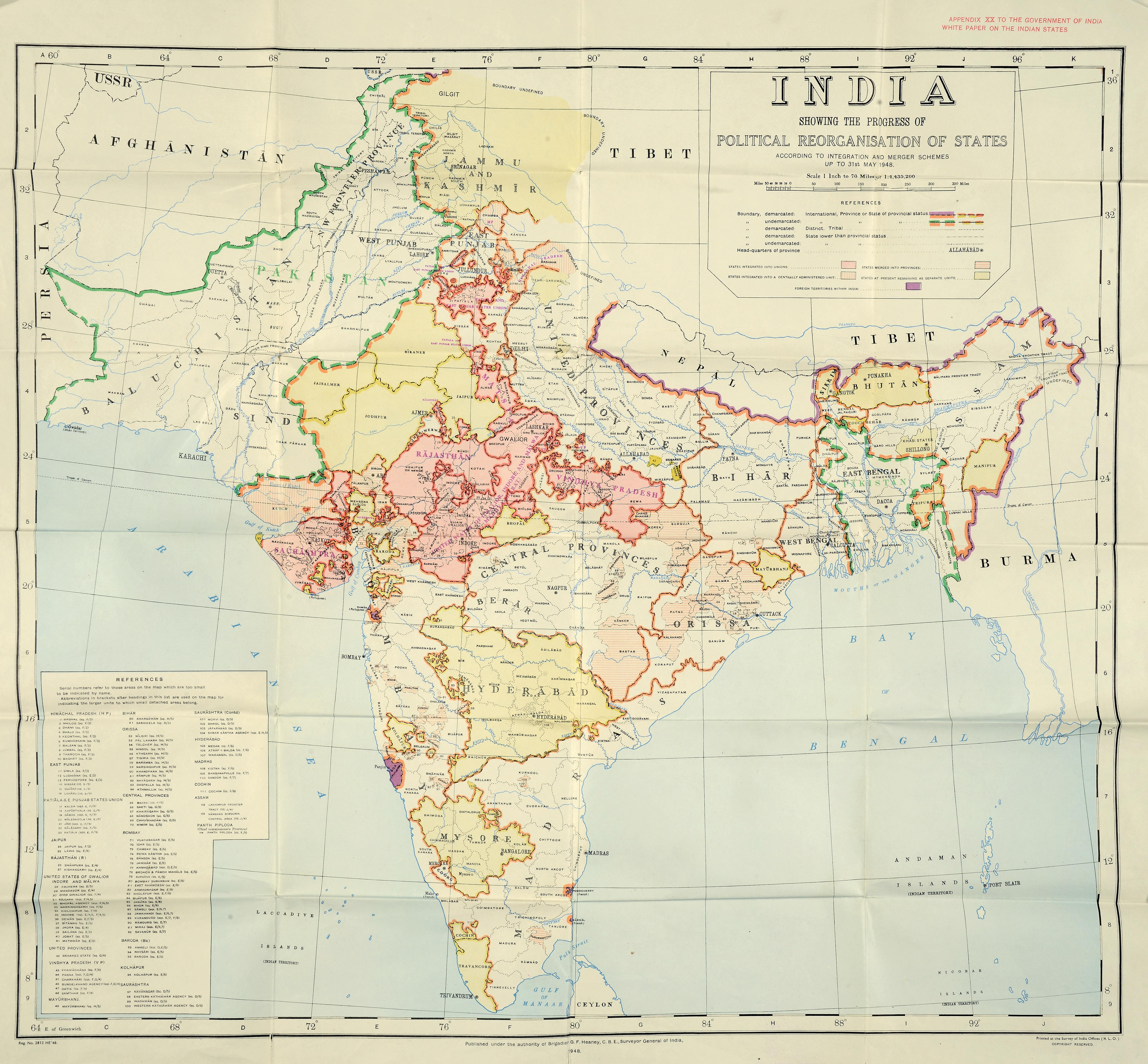
Mayurbhanj State under merger plan with Odisha, as of 31 May 1948.

Following India's independence on 15 August 1947, the State of Mayurbhanj became an independent unit and soon after, a State Legislative Assembly was formed with cabinet ministers (praja mandal). These ministers included Chief Minister Sarat Chandra Das (Minister of Home, Finance, Audit, Planning and Reconstruction), Bidyadhar Mohapatra (Minister of Revenue, Law, Health & Local Government), and M. Nayak (Minister of Development, Education, Supply, Transport, Public Works, Commerce, and Labour) by a proclamation of the Maharaja Pratap Chandra Bhanjdeo on 9 December 1947. The Maharaja formally transferred most of his powers to this body. When Sardar Patel, the then Home Minister, met the rulers of the state with his proposal for merger with India on 14 December 1947, the Maharaja of Mayurbhanj said that he had already granted responsible Government in his State, and hence he could not make any commitment without consulting his Ministers. In view of this and being a tribal state, Patel didn't compel the merger. The premier of state was left out of the discussions. On 17 October 1948, the Maharaja and Chief Minister went to Delhi, where the Maharaja signed the Instrument of Merger with stipulations, taking into account social instability driven by the Jharkhand statehood movement and administrative mismanagement. The administration of the State was taken over by the Government of India with effect from 9 November 1948, and Indian Civil Servants D.V. Rege was appointed as Chief Commissioner to the State. However, it was subsequently decided that since Mayurbhanj linguistically and culturally had close links with Odisha, it should merge with that Province. On 16 December 1948, V. P. Menon came to the Baripada and announced the merger of Mayurbhanj with Odisha, which officially effected from 1 January 1949. Through the merging with Odisha was not peaceful. The Non-Odia inhabitants, primarily the Santhals of Rairangpur, headed by Sunaram Soren proposed that the state either merge with Jharkhand, then proposed state of Bihar or remain as a Union territory of India.

== Geography ==
Mayurbhanj is land-locked with a geographical area of 10,418 km^{2} (4,022 sq mi) and lies in the north east corner of the state. It is bordered on the northeast by Jhargram district of West Bengal and East Singhbhum district of Jharkhand, to the north by Seraikela Kharsawan district of Jharkhand, West Singhbhum district of Jharkhand on the west, Kendujhar district on the southwest and Balasore district on the southeast.

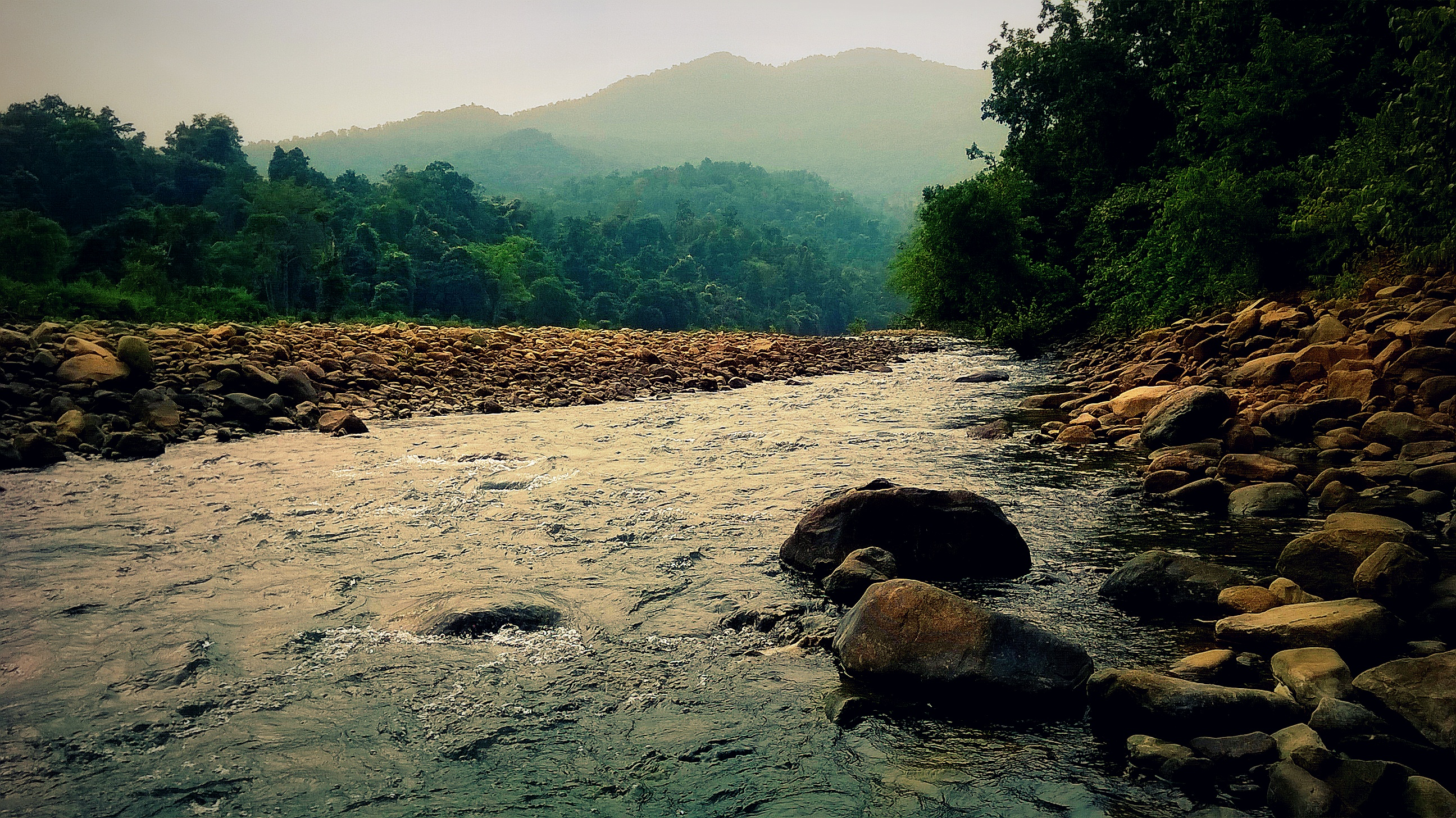
Palpala River near lulung, Similipal National Park

Mayurbhanj's geography is defined by the Simlipal National Park located in the centre of the district. Covering more than a fourth of the district's area, these forests surround the Simlipal Hills, which form the watershed for the district dividing the district into distinct east and west regions. Elevations in the eastern region include Udala (52.73 feet), Baripada (48.76 feet), Betnoti (43.89 feet), Haripur Garh (21.64 feet), Muruda (19.50 feet), and Amarda (18.28 feet). On the western side, elevations are observed in Bidubhandar Ghati (487.98 feet), Jashipur (405.68 feet), Raruan (371.24 feet), Karanjia (370.94 feet), Khiching (362.71 feet), Rairangpur (262.43 feet), and Bangiriposi (122.83 feet). The hills attain their highest elevation at Khairiburu, reaching 3,865 feet at the center, while Meshasani stands at a height of 3,824 feet to the south. Additionally, there are numerous other peaks exceeding 2,500 feet. The northwestern parts of these foothills have been mined for iron ore for more than a century. The country to the east of Simlipal is an extension of the Odisha coastal plains and is drained by the Subarnarekha River and Budhabalanga River along with their tributaries. The land is almost level with a slight slope to the coast. The indigenous vegetation consisted of pure Sal forests which have now been replaced by paddy cultivation.

The western plains of Mayurbhanj are an extension of the Odisha Plateau. They are mostly flat with small hills and slopes but are at a higher altitude than the eastern plains, the height rising from north to south. The streams here drain into the Baitarani River in Kendujhar or flow into Jharkhand to the north. There are still isolated open forests to be seen, but paddy is the most common cultivated crop.

The Budhabalanga is the main river of Mayurbhanj. It arises in the Simlipal Hills and forms the waterfall at Barehipani in a northward course. It then turns to the south east and flows between steep banks and sandbars. Both Baripada and the ancient capital of Haripur are located along its banks. The river receives two small tributaries before entering the Bay of Bengal beyond Balasore. Other important minor rivers are Deo, Sone, Gangahar and Salandi. Floods are uncommon except during exceptional rainfall in the hills owing to the seasonal nature of the streams and their steep banks.

Mayurbhanj (2022)

Climate chart (precipitation, max. and min. temperature)
J	F	M	A	M	J	J	A	S	O	N	D
29 24 14	23 27 16	4.6 37 22	24 40 26	89 37 26	165 36 26	294 31 26	488 31 26	179 32 26	119 31 23	0 28 18	0 26 15
- █ Average max. and min. temperatures in °C
- █ Precipitation totals in mm
- Source: Meteorological Centre, Bhubaneswar
Imperial conversion
J	F	M	A	M	J	J	A	S	O	N	D
1.1 75 57	0.9 81 60	0.2 98 71	0.9 105 79	3.5 99 78	6.5 97 80	12 88 79	19 87 78	7 90 78	4.7 87 74	0 83 64	0 79 58
- █ Average max. and min. temperatures in °F
- █ Precipitation totals in inches

The climate of Mayurbhanj is sub tropical marked by high humidity and rainfall during the Monsoon. The Simlipal Hills influence the weather substantially and exhibit higher rainfall and lower maximum temperatures than the rest of the district. The average annual rainfall is around 164 cm (65 in). Summer temperatures in Baripada can occasionally cross 45-degree Celsius but thunderstorms in the evening are common which have a moderating influence. Minimum temperature in winter can go down to 8 degrees. Fog occurs occasionally during winters.

== Demographics ==
Historical population

Year	Pop.	±%
1872	258,680	—
1881	385,737	+49.1%
1891	532,223	+38.0%
1901	610,383	+14.7%
1911	729,218	+19.5%
1921	754,314	+3.4%
1931	889,603	+17.9%
1941	984,741	+10.7%

Year	Pop.	±%
1951	1,028,825	+4.5%
1961	1,204,043	+17.0%
1971	1,434,200	+19.1%
1981	1,581,873	+10.3%
1991	1,884,580	+19.1%
2001	2,223,456	+18.0%
2011	2,519,738	+13.3%
2021 (est.)	2,741,398	+8.8%

Source: Mayurbhanj district Gazetteer & Census of India

According to the 2011 census Mayurbhanj district has a population of 2,519,738, roughly equal to the nation of Kuwait or the US state of Nevada. This gives it a ranking of 171st in India (out of a total of 640). The state also held the 3rd rank in India in terms of the number of villages, with 3,950 villages. The district has a population density of 241 inhabitants per square kilometre (620/sq mi). Its population growth rate over the decade 2001–2011 was 13.06%. Mayurbhanj has a sex ratio of 1006 females for every 1000 males, much higher than the Indian average of 940 and a literacy rate of 63.17%, slightly lower than the Indian average. 7.66% of the population lives in urban areas. Scheduled Castes and Scheduled Tribes make up 7.33% and 58.72% of the population respectively. The bulk of the population is concentrated in the Sadar and Kaptipada subdivisions which border the fertile coastal Odisha plains and are part of an extensive rice growing region. Bamanghat also has a large population engaged in agriculture and industry.

Statistical Data of Mayurbhanj District – 2011 Census
Administration				Population						Education		Employment		
Block	Area (km^{2}) (Note: The block-wise area in the presented table does not correspond to the district's geographical area of 10,418 square kilometers. This discrepancy is due to the exclusion of Reserved Forest areas, which account for 3,325.89 square kilometers as of the year 2020. In terms of classification, Mayurbhanj district encompasses 3,325.89 square kilometers of Reserved Forest area, 77.98 square kilometers of Demarcated Protected Area, 65.75 square kilometers of Un-demarcated Forest area, 2.2 square kilometers of Unclassified Forest area, and 814.73 square kilometers of Other Forest areas. In total, the forest cover in Mayurbhanj district spans 4,458.1 square kilometers, representing 42.79% of the district's total area.)	Gram panchayat	Village	Total pop.	Density	Sex ratio (♀/♂)	SC	ST	Others	Literacy rate	Gender gap in literacy	WPR	Main worker	Marginal worker
Odisha	155707	6798	53845	41,974,218	270	979	17.13	22.85	60.02	72.83	17.58	41.79	61.04	38.96
Mayurbhanj	10418	382	3,950	2,519,738	242	1006	7.33	58.72	33.95	63.17	21.05	48.56	44.82	55.18
Bahalda	266.62	12	104	86081	333	986	6.23	58.05	35.72	63.79	23.81	48.12	39.24	60.76
Bangriposi	300.16	18	227	103,880	347	1002	5.37	69.66	24.97	58.58	23.12	50.16	36.63	63.37
Baripada	193.02	11	102	69,782	362	961	2.65	74.11	23.24	58.01	21.31	52.04	46.96	53.04
Badsahi	312.15	30	224	146,232	469	988	9.59	50.69	39.72	64.31	18.87	50.45	45.82	54.18
Betnoti	298.31	22	227	150,434	505	987	11.08	41.13	47.78	66.65	19.03	46.43	43.35	56.65
Bijatola	256.62	10	153	64,193	251	1026	4.16	75.75	20.09	55.85	26.11	54.29	47.61	52.39
Bisoi	330.48	10	156	74,572	226	1051	4.78	69.36	25.86	60.71	24.84	53.83	41.98	58.02
G.B. Nagar	163.96	13	132	75,345	460	1012	13.52	55.36	31.12	65.07	20.2	45.32	55.02	44.98
Jamda	206.63	8	79	59,402	288	1064	4.94	73.47	21.59	60.21	26.81	50.03	43.68	56.32
Jashipur	443.12	20	228	101,058	229	1027	7.18	69.78	23.04	56.85	20.88	52.81	43.86	56.14
Kaptipada	626.73	26	155	148,717	238	997	3.94	66.61	29.46	54.5	20.92	45.72	43.29	56.71
Karanjia	314.76	13	156	91,518	291	1020	6.94	67.87	25.2	60.37	20.33	48.56	42.45	57.55
Khunta	222.23	14	132	74,155	334	1034	4.49	79.03	16.48	60.06	21.97	55.86	48.73	51.27
Kuliana	299.77	17	235	101,151	338	994	6.48	66.28	27.24	62.34	21.77	47.81	41.22	58.78
Kusumi	312.99	12	114	93,116	298	1045	7.03	64.18	28.79	59.75	24.38	50.63	40.82	59.18
Morada	284.01	20	169	103,775	366	1012	11.82	44.03	44.15	64.62	21.63	50.25	46.4	53.6
Rairangpur	205.43	9	109	60,565	295	1038	8.05	53.5	38.45	64.02	23.32	45.57	55.19	44.81
Raruan	212.53	12	110	66,504	313	1010	7.57	53.64	38.79	62.99	21.97	49.83	36.47	63.53
Rasgovindpur	231.91	15	177	96,526	417	978	11.79	54.61	33.6	66.21	21.45	44.96	36.94	63.06
Samkhunta	192.24	14	136	79,883	416	1002	4.79	66.73	28.48	59.12	19.28	50.17	48.7	51.3
Saraskana	311.84	15	200	100,816	324	981	6.47	57.86	35.66	63.55	23.22	48.69	33.28	66.72
Sukruli	174.05	9	90	60,577	349	1031	7.02	62.97	30.01	64.12	20.28	40.02	38.76	61.24
Suliapada	278.74	15	193	102,263	367	989	6.39	40.51	53.09	66.18	20.64	56.13	37.45	62.55
Thakurmunda	427.51	16	173	104,694	245	1044	4.5	74.93	20.58	51.68	22.69	50.99	42.11	57.89
Tiring	168.86	10	80	57,076	339	1022	5.47	74.57	19.96	60.74	26.82	50.93	42.46	57.54
Udala	209.3	11	89	76,147	364	998	5.56	74.39	20.05	61.4	21.37	53.55	42.99	57.01
Baripada (M)	33.37	—N/a	—N/a	109,743	3289	936	11.37	15.18	73.45	88.52	8.19	33.61	84.76	15.24
Karanjia (N.A.C.)	18.64	—N/a	—N/a	22,865	1227	1017	15.17	29.13	55.7	83.35	11.34	33.98	85.97	14.03
Rairangpur (N.A.C.)	14.38	—N/a	—N/a	25,516	1775	1022	8.85	18.64	72.51	86.54	9.84	33.39	84.09	15.91
Udala (N.A.C.)	7.89	—N/a	—N/a	13,152	1667	963	7.49	25.11	67.4	87.79	8.8	37.86	77.81	22.19

=== Tribes and communities ===
Tribals constitute the largest section of the population, forming slightly more than half. The Santal are the largest tribe and the second-largest group in the district as a whole after the Odia people. The Ho people form the second-largest tribal group, followed by the Bhumij. The Santal and Ho speak respective language among themselves, but have also acquired some degree of fluency in Odia. Their languages belong to the Munda languages family and are therefore distinct from the prevalent Indo-Aryan languages, such as Odia, Hindi, and Bengali, spoken in the region. The Bhumij, however, have mostly adopted Odia as their language. Other tribes, including the Bathudi, Bhuyan, and Gond, as well as the Sounti and Kharia, speak Odia.

As per 1931 census, the district comprised 131 different communities, primarily by Santal (28.61%), Ho (Kolha) (12.07%), Bhumij (8.71%), Kudmi Mahato (6.77%), Bathudi (5.19%), Goura (4.39%), Pana Tanti (3.38%), Bhuyan (2.62%), Khandaita (2.23%), Bhanja Purana (2.2%) and other communities like Kamar, Kumbhar, Gond, Kharia, Brahmin, Teli, Saunti, Dhoba, Tanti, Gola, Dom, Bhandari, Karana, Patra, Baisnaba, Ghasi, Sadgop, Mahali, Sabara, Amanta, Sundhi, Pan (Jena Pan), Purana, Keut, Hadi, Dhandachhatra Majhi, Raju, Kshatriya, Ujia, Bagal, Gouria, Rarhi, Oraon, Baisa, Karua, Thatari, Sahara, Kayastha, Rajuar, Munda constitute 20.35% with each community shared by 0.9% to 2.0%. The rest of 3.24% was shared by minority communities whose population below 1,000 in the district.

=== Religion ===
Religions in Mayurbhanj district (2011)
Religion	Percent
Hinduism	83.86%
ORP	13.96%
Islam	1.34%
Christianity	0.60%
Buddhism, Sikhism and Jainism	0.04%
Not stated	0.21%
*ORP mostly adherents of Sarnaism

According to the 2011 Census 83.86% (2,113,079) people are Hindus, 1.34% (33,706) are Muslims, 0.6% (15,008) are Christians, 0.03% (661) are Sikhs, 0.01% (162) are Buddhist, 0% (109) Jains, and 0.21% (5,299) didn't stated any religious affiliation, while the rest 13.96% (351,714) are adherent of tribal faiths (primarily Sarnaism) and other unclassified sect and beliefs. Hinduism in the district is practiced by most of its inhabitants through various sects and a blend of traditions, with a legacy of c. 8th-century Shaktism at the Kichakeshwari Temple in Khiching, c. 15th-century Vaishnavism in Haripur, alongside the ancient Jagannath cult, and the fl. c. 16th – c. 19th-century Jagannath and Ambika Temples in Baripada. The tribals, who make up more than half of the district's population, also adherent of Hinduism with a substantial amount of tribal rites and rituals. The Sarna religion grew in the district as a tribal religion after the 1940s, promoted by Santali ideologist Raghunath Murmu, with initially 2,576 and 1,498 Santals of Rairangpur subdivision of the district recorded as adherents in the 1951 and 1961 census respectively, a figure that increased to 87,839 in the following census; with substantial growth, it became the second most-followed religion in the district.

Muslims and Christians comprise a tiny minority. The former are almost all migrants from Coastal Odisha except for a sizeable population of Bihari Muslims near the border with Chaibasa. They immigrated into the district after c. 18th century, settling mainly in urban areas, and by the 1891 census, the district was inhabited by 2,982 Muslims, mostly from the Sunni sect. Christians in the district are mostly converts from tribal communities, with 85.31% (12,803 out of 15,008 adherents in 2011) belonging to tribal groups such as the Santals, Kolhas (Ho), Mundas, and Bhumijs. Historically, Christianity was not prevalent among the district's inhabitants but gradually gained followers after c. 18th century through missionary efforts. Initially, 783 person returned as Christian in 1911 census, contributed by the Roman Catholic Church (1879) and the Evangelical Church (1896), established in the district headquarters, Baripada, a town that had recorded only 20 Christians in the previous census. Kate Allenby, one of the missionaries, who made significant contributions to the spread of Christianity, along with welfare of the population. Buddhism and Jainism, although forming an insignificant portion of the current population, historically flourished in the region before the emergence of the Bhanja dynasty. At present, semi-Buddhistic practices, including the worship of Mahayana deities such as Tara and Avalokiteshvara under different names, are observed in some rural areas.

=== Languages ===
Languages of Mayurbhanj district (2011)
1. Odia (54.3%)
2. Santali (24.8%)
3. Ho (7.58%)
4. Mundari (3.92%)
5. Kurmali (2.77%)
6. Bengali (1.34%)
7. Others (5.25%)
The Kurmali dialect spoken in the district has been replaced by the Manbhumi dialect of Bengali. (Note: (G. A. Grierson 1903. Linguistic survey of India, Vol. V (II), p. 146): "In the Orissa Tributary States, the Kuṛmī nearly all talk Bengali, although living in an Oriya speaking country." (L. S. S. O'Malley 1913, p. 188): In Mayurbhanj it [Kurmali] is usually called Kurmi Bengali or Kurumali Bengali, as well as simply Kurmi. With regard to its character, the late Maharaja of Mayurbhanj wrote as follows :— "The mother-tongue of the Kurmis of Mayurbhanj is Bengali, with the peculiar intonation belonging to them. These Kurmis have, as a rule, come from Midnapore and settled permanently in Mayurbhanj. Their dialect shows traces of Hindi and Oriya as well but it can not be called either." (Laeequddin 1937, p. 241): "The situation, however, is not the same with regard to the Kurmis. They had their own language, Kurmali, which they have abandoned in large numbers in favour of the peculiar form of Bengali spoken by them, which they brought with them into the [Mayurbhanj] State in the course of their migration through Manbhum and Midnapore.")

At the time of the 2011 Census of India, 54.33% of the population in the district spoke Odia, 24.81% Santali, 7.58% Ho, 3.92% Mundari, 2.77% Kurmali and 1.34% Bengali as their first language.

Police station-wise language distribution in the district, 2011 census

By linguistic family, 60.6% of the population speaks Indo-European languages, 36.7% speaks Austroasiatic languages, 0.2% speaks Dravidian languages, and 2.5% speaks other unclassified languages. The Austroasiatic languages are mainly spoken by Scheduled Tribes, who are also fluent in Odia alongside their native language. The Mayurbhanj dialect, locally known as Mayurbhanjia, closely resembles Coastal Odisha's Baleswari Odia but incorporates certain tribal words for everyday objects, with Bengali lexical influence, especially in rural areas. The native language of Santali is largely used in its spoken form, Odia or Hindi being preferred for writing. Bengali is used in the parts of Sadar subdivision that adjoin Jhargram district, although there is significant Odia admixture. Kudmali is another important language, primarily spoken by the Kudumi Mahato in the border areas of Jharkhand and West Bengal. Other notable languages include Ho and Bhumij (sometimes regarded as a Mundari dialect) spoken in some pocketed areas. Hindi and Urdu are mostly spoken in urban areas, primarily by Marwari and Muslims.

== Administration ==
The district is headed by the Collector and District magistrate, usually an officer of the Indian Administrative Service (IAS) who oversees development, revenue collection and maintenance of law and order. He is assisted at headquarters by two Additional District Magistrates (ADM) and a number of Deputy Collectors. Various line departments ranging from Agriculture and Education to Health are operate under the Collector's supervision. There are four territorial subdivisions of the district – Sadar (headquartered at Baripada), Kaptipada (Udala), Bamanghaty (Rairangpur) and Panchpir (Karanjia) composing 26 blocks, 382 Gram panchayats and 3945 villages. Each subdivision is headed by a Sub Collector cum Sub Divisional Magistrate who reports to the Collector. Except for the Sadar Sub Collector, who is often an IAS officer, the other Sub Collectors and ADMs belong to the Odisha Administrative Service.

The police force is headed by a Superintendent of Police belonging to the Indian Police Service who is assisted by Additional SPs at headquarters and SDPOs at subdivisional headquarters. There are a total of 32 police stations – each headed by an Inspector or Sub Inspector in-charge. While the Superintendent reports on general law and order matters to the District Magistrate, he is almost completely independent in practice as far as the police force is concerned.

Each subdivision is further divided into blocks and tahsils. The former are development units headed by a Block Development Officer. Each block is divided into numerous Gram Panchayats (GPs) for a total of 404 in the district. The GPs and Blocks report to the Project Director, District Rural Development Authority (DRDA), an ADM rank officer. The Collector is the CEO of DRDA and thus exercises direct control over its functioning. The tahsils on the other hand are revenue subdivisions with the Tahsildar also being an Executive Magistrate and reporting to the Sub Collector. He is assisted by a number of Revenue Inspectors and Amins. The district has a total of 26 blocks and tahsils, the highest in Odisha.

The Simlipal National Park, while formally a part of the four subdivisions noted above, is in practice under a Field Director belonging to the Indian Forest Service (IFS). The deputy director, also an IFS officer, is responsible for the day-to-day operations of the Park. Three other Divisional Forest Officers are in charge of the forests outside the National Park area.

The Judiciary is headed by a District and Sessions Judge who exercises both criminal and civil jurisdiction. He also enjoys revisionary powers over certain orders of the District Magistrate and Sub Divisional Magistrates. He is assisted on the civil side by Civil Judges of senior and junior divisions and on the criminal side by Chief Judicial Magistrate and Sub Divisional Judicial Magistrates.

== Economy ==
Economic activity of Mayurbhanj district (2011)
1. Cultivator (19.5%)
2. Agricultural labourer (46.5%)
3. Household-industry (9.30%)
4. Other (24.7%)

The district contains three major physiographic regions: a central mountainous zone, high flatlands in the west, and low flatlands in the east. Forests cover about 42% of the total area, with the remaining 58% used for settlements and economic activities. The workforce constitutes 48.56% of the population, comprising 19.51% cultivators, 46.48% agricultural labourers, 9.30% household-industry workers, and 24.70% other workers. Agriculture is the predominant occupation and is largely subsistence-based, and a substantial proportion of the rural population depends on government welfare programmes. The district has identified mineral resources, but industrial development remains limited, as significant areas fall within forested and Scheduled Area zones regulated by specific land-use and environmental frameworks. Non-agricultural activity is primarily concentrated in handloom, handicraft, and cottage industries.

In the 2021–22 financial year, the district recorded an agricultural output of 10,826,754 quintals of paddy, along with smaller quantities of groundnut (10,883 quintals), maize (5,630 quintals), mung (2,745 quintals), mustard (947 quintals), biri (929 quintals), kulthi (325 quintals), til (267 quintals), wheat (476 quintals) and ragi (193 quintals). Agriculture is supported by irrigation projects such as Baldiha, Bankabal, Deokunda, Deo, Kala, Katra, Khadakhai, Nesa, Subarnarekha and Sunei, covering 158,891 ha during the Kharif season and 77,291 ha in the Rabi season. Allied sectors produced 75.80 thousand MT of milk, 1,095.71 lakh eggs and 10.92 thousand MT of meat. The industrial activity, although largely centred on household industries, also consists of 3,348 MSMEs employing around 8,000 people. The district hosts three iron-ore mines at Gorumahisani, Badampahar and Sulaipat, and a quartz mine, together spanning 2,381.574 ha and producing 2,040.443 MT valued at ₹11,698.66 crore; other minerals such as copper, bauxite, china clay, vanadium ores, titanium, pyrophyllite, talc/steatite/soapstone, nickel, kyanite and magnesite occur in small quantities but are not commercially exploited. The district generated ₹3,871.67 lakh in land revenue and ₹9,067.25 lakh in tax collection. Tourism contributes modestly through 19 identified centres, including Similipal, Khiching, Haripur, Jashipur, Kuliana, Baripada, Kuchai, Deokund, Bangiriposhi, Jamsola, Bhimkunda, Bisoi, Manatri, Rairangpur, Samibrukhya and Suleiput. The district is served by 273 banking institutions and 266 ATMs, with ₹11,679.64 crore in deposits and ₹4,019.84 crore in credit.

=== Transport ===
The road network of Mayurbhanj is organised in a circular manner owing to the presence of the Simlipal Hills and forest in the centre of the district, which were first constructed in the early 20th century by the rulers of the state. Overall, the district is served by 263.46 km of national highways and 240.20 km of state highways, along with 139.73 km of major district roads and 692.55 km of other district roads. It also includes 6,058.10 km of inter-village roads, 5,328.87 km of intra-village roads, 3,789.74 km of village roads and 937.79 km of forest roads, bringing the total road network to 17,450.44 km.

The National Highway 18 takes off from the Kolkata-Chennai highway near Simulia in Balasore. It shortly thereafter enters the district and passes the major villages of Baisinga, Betnoti and Krushnachandrapur before crossing Baripada and Jharpokharia. It finally exits the district at Jamsola to enter East Singhbhum district for a total length of 86 km (53 mi). National Highway 49 also enters the district at Jamsola. It then crosses Bangriposi and Jashipur before entering Kendujhar district. This is the main highway connecting Kolkata with Mumbai and therefore sees heavy traffic throughout the year. National Highway 220 covers the stretch from Karanjia to Tiring passing through Jashipur and Rairangpur on the way. Odisha state highway 19 is another important state highways link the district headquarter Baripada from Jaleswar, Udala and Gopiballavpur I of West Bengal.

The Mayurbhanj State Railway was a 2 ft 6 in (762 mm) narrow gauge line funded by the Mayurbhanj State that connected Talbandh in the Simlipal Hills to Rupsa on the Bengal Nagpur Railway mainline, mainly to carry timber. The major stations en route were Bangriposi and Baripada. The line was shut down in 2002 and reopened after conversion to broad gauge in 2007. The Talbandh-Bangriposi stretch has been abandoned for many years now and the line terminates at the latter station. The total length within the district is 83 km (52 mi). Another electrified broad-gauge line from Jamshedpur enters the district at Bahalda before splitting at Aunlajhori. One branch goes to Badampahar while the other terminates at Gorumahisani. The total length of these lines is about 63 km (39 mi) and they are used exclusively to ferry iron ore from the mines at the above locations. Both these routes fall under the South Eastern Railway.

Mayurbhanj has no active airports, although RAF Amarda Road was a major base for the Royal Air Force and the United States Army Air Forces during World War II. Another abandoned airfield, once used by the Maharaja of Mayurbhanj, is located at Rajabasa near Baripada. However, the nearest Kalaikunda Air Force Station, located in Kharagpur, is used for official purposes.

== Culture ==
Mayurbhanj District in Odisha is known for its rich cultural heritage and vibrant traditions. The district celebrates two prominent festivals, Makar Parva and Karama Parva. The famous Chhau dance, a dynamic dance form, has gained worldwide recognition. Mayurbhanj District is also associated with Jhumar, a popular traditional folk song that reflects the community's celebrations, marriages, social functions, sorrows, and joys.

=== Festivals ===
==== Ratha Yatra ====
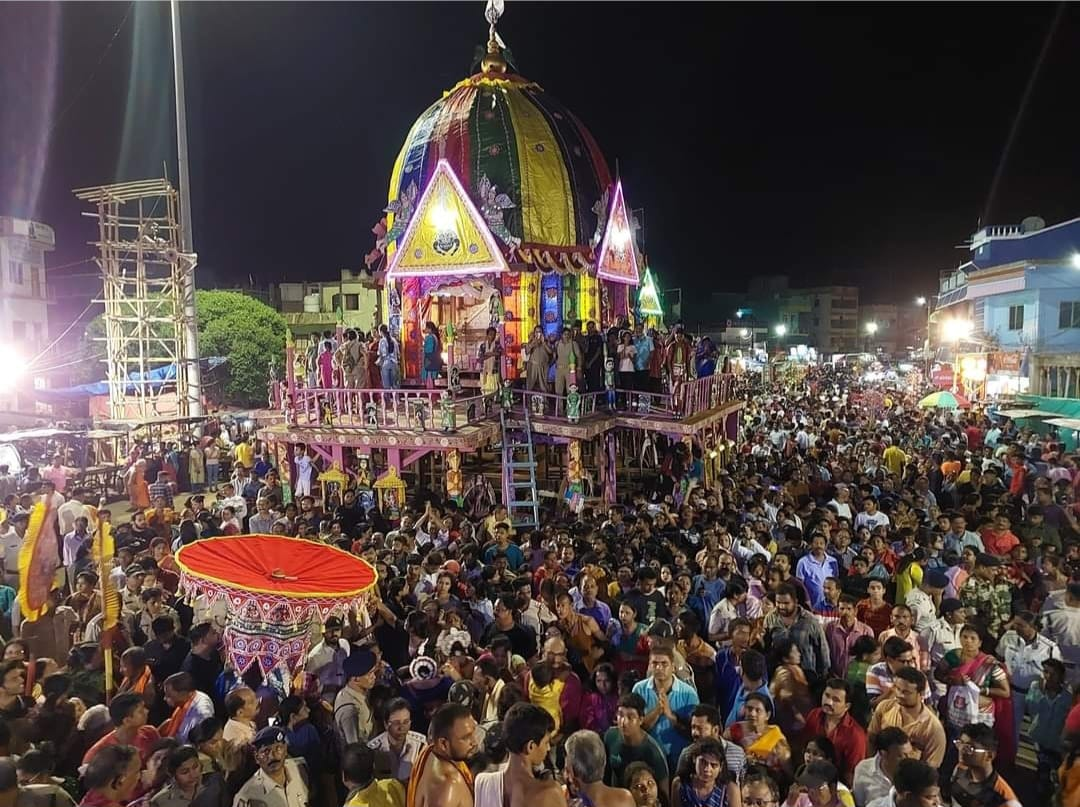
Baripada Ratha Jatra

In Baripada, Lord Jagannath is worshipped as Shri Shri Haribaldev Mahaprabhu, alongside the revered Puri temple. The Haribaldev temple in Baripada, built in 1575 A.D., is made of laterite stone with intricate designs. It features Vimana, Jagamohan, and Nata Mandira structures and is surrounded by a boundary wall. The temple is well-preserved and hosts the annual Car festival, during which the three deities are brought to the Radhamohan Temple (Mausimaa Mandir) for a two-day event. The Baripada Car festival involves women exclusively in pulling Maa Subhadra's chariot.

=== Dance ===
==== Chhau dance ====
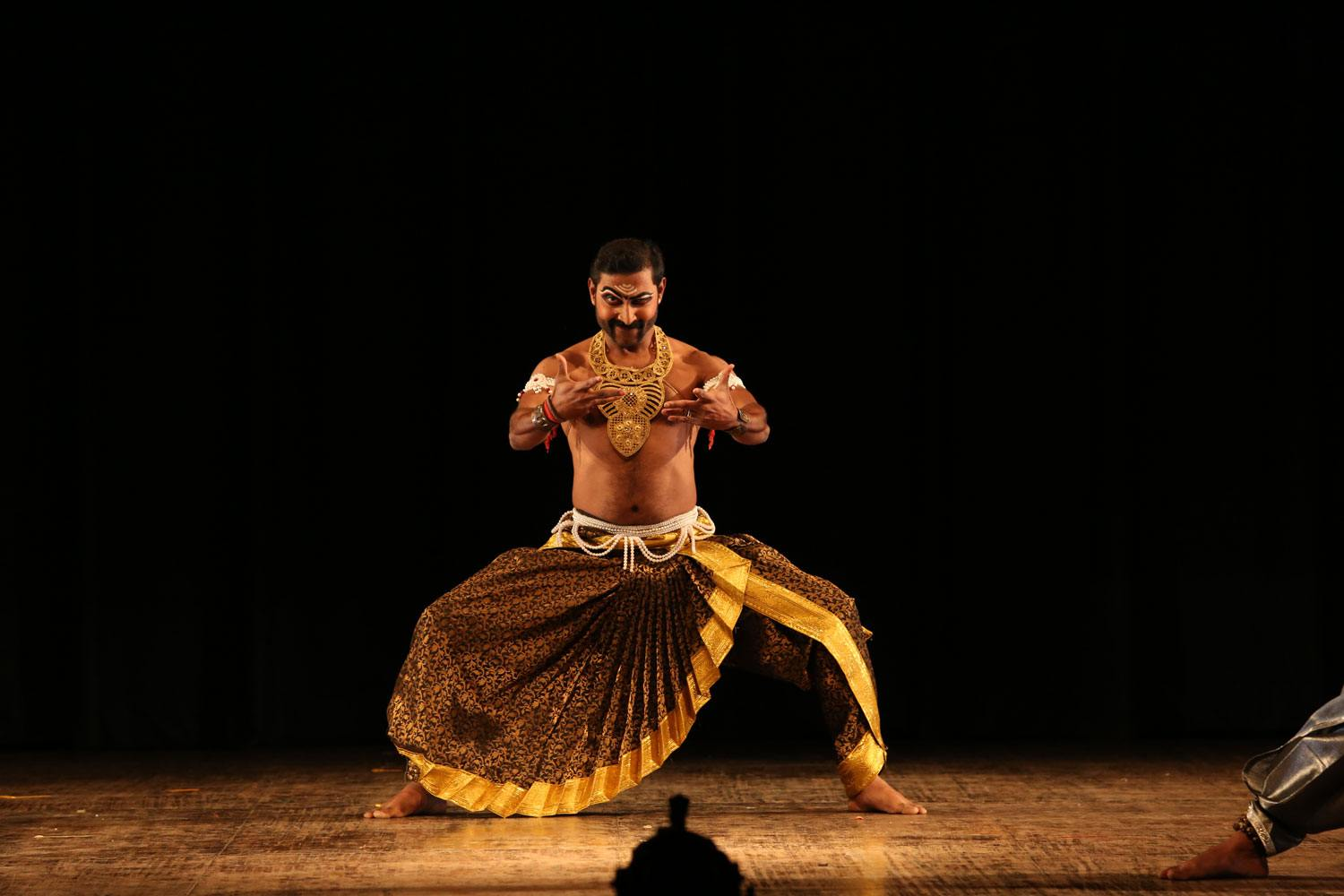
Ravana character in Mayurbhanj Chhau

Mayurbhanj Chhau dance, which has gained global recognition, such as UNESCO cultural heritage for its artistry and vigor. It draws inspiration from various sources, including the Ramayana, the Mahabharata, folk traditions, and tribal elements.Chhau is glorious heritage of Mayurbhanj. The enlightened kings of Mayurbhanj like Maharaja Shriram Chandra Bhanjdeo and Pratap Chandra Bhanjdeo, one of the builders of modern Orissa composed the famous "War-Dance" and presented the same in 1912 at Calcutta in honor of George V, the British emperor, who got dazed at the beauty and splendor of Mayurbhanj Chhau and appreciations were showered from the press and the elites.

The fame of Mayurbhanj's Chhau has crossed geographical limitations and has claimed worldwide fans for its beauty, vigor and marvel of the art. Every year in Baripada, Chhau dance is organized at the famous Chhau field in Baripada.

==== Jhumar ====
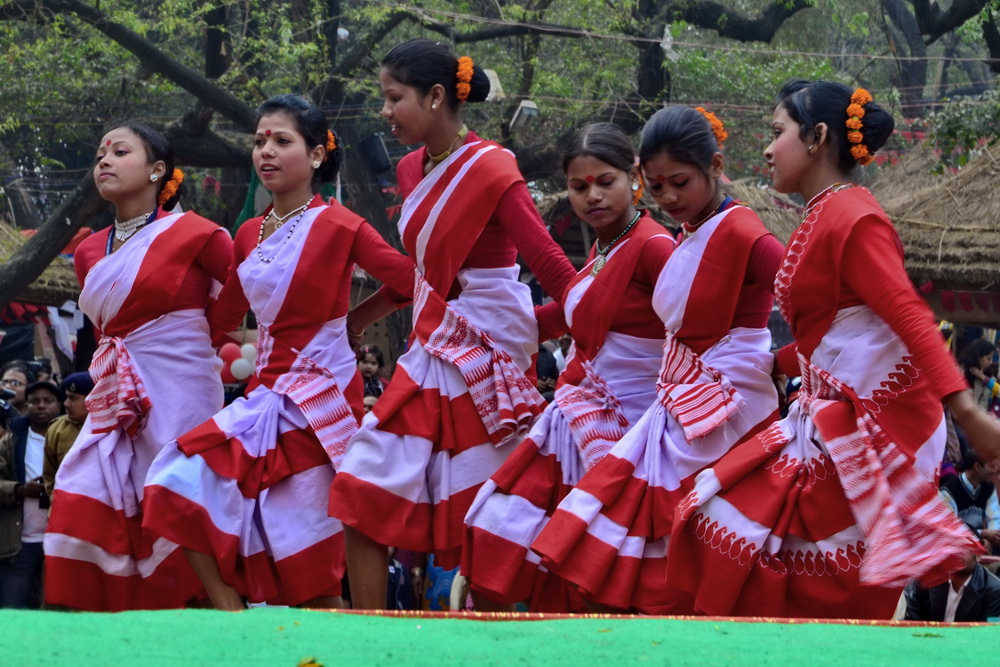
Jhumar folk dance

Jhumar, a popular traditional folk song and dance form. Jhumar is performed on various occasions, such as weddings, festivals and social functions. It features lively music, rhythmic beats, and energetic dance movements. The songs depict themes of love, romance, and everyday life experiences. Jhumar serves as a cultural expression and preserving the folk traditions and heritage of the region.

=== Cuisine ===
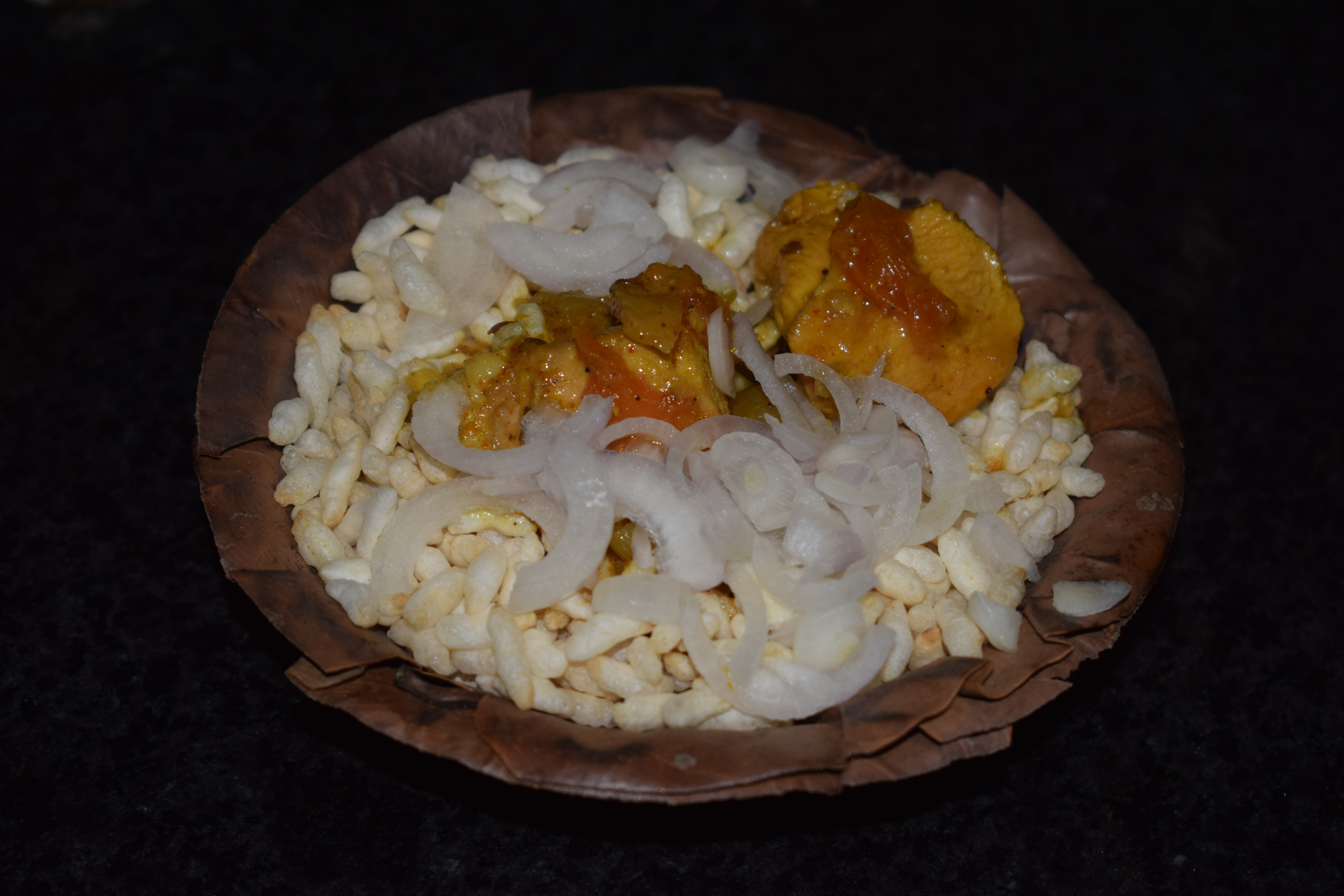
Mudhi Mansa

Mayurbhanj is proud of its traditional food like Mudhi Mansa, Dal Khechidi, ram ruchuka. The influence of very exotic food like Jal – Ghantei ( made of pond snails ) and Red ant chutney can be also seen among locals.

== Tourism ==
=== Amarda Road Airstrip ===
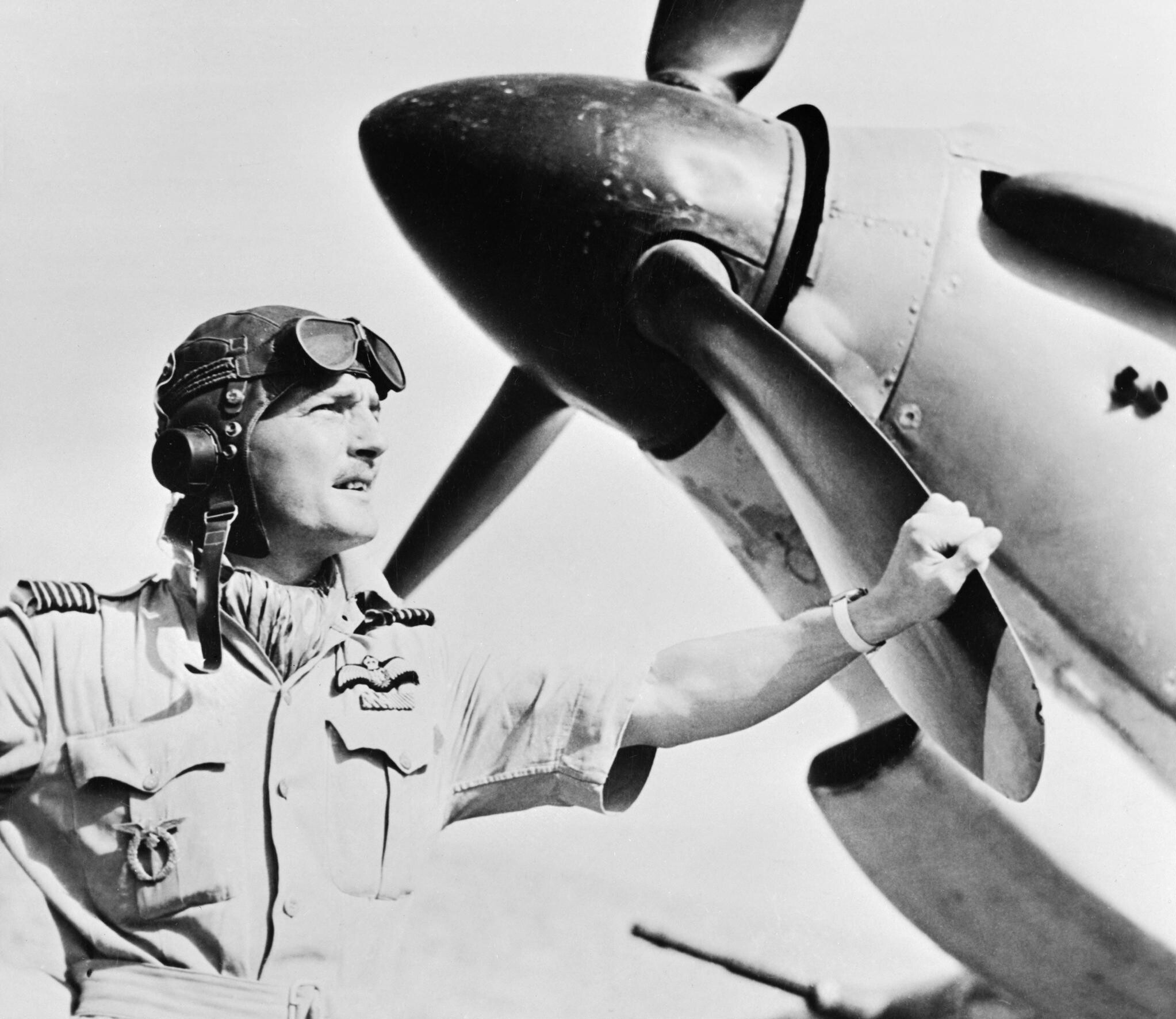
Wing Commander Frank Carey, Officer Commanding the Air Firing Training Unit, based at Amarda Road, India, standing by the nose of a Hawker Hurricane, April 1943.

The Amarda Road airstrip has played a vital role in the defence of India during the second World War. It came into existence during the war as a forward airfield against the Japanese conquest of Burma. Known to be the longest runway in Asia, measuring over 3.5 km, this large strip served its purpose well as a landing ground for planes and also as a training space for special bombing missions. The Amarda Road airstrip spreads across an area of nearly 900 acres.

== Notable people ==
- Droupadi Murmu, 15th and current President of India
- G. C. Murmu, 14th Comptroller and Auditor General of India
- Soumya Ranjan Patnaik, politician and founder of Sambad news paper
- Uttam Mohanty, Odia actor
- Raghunath Murmu, Santali writer
- Papu Pom Pom, Odia actor
- Purnima Hembram, athletes
- Sriram Chandra Bhanj Deo, rulers

== See also ==
- Mayurbhanj State
- Simlipal National Park
- Khiching
- Belgadia Palace
