= Geography of Odisha =

Odisha is situated in eastern coast on Bay of Bengal.

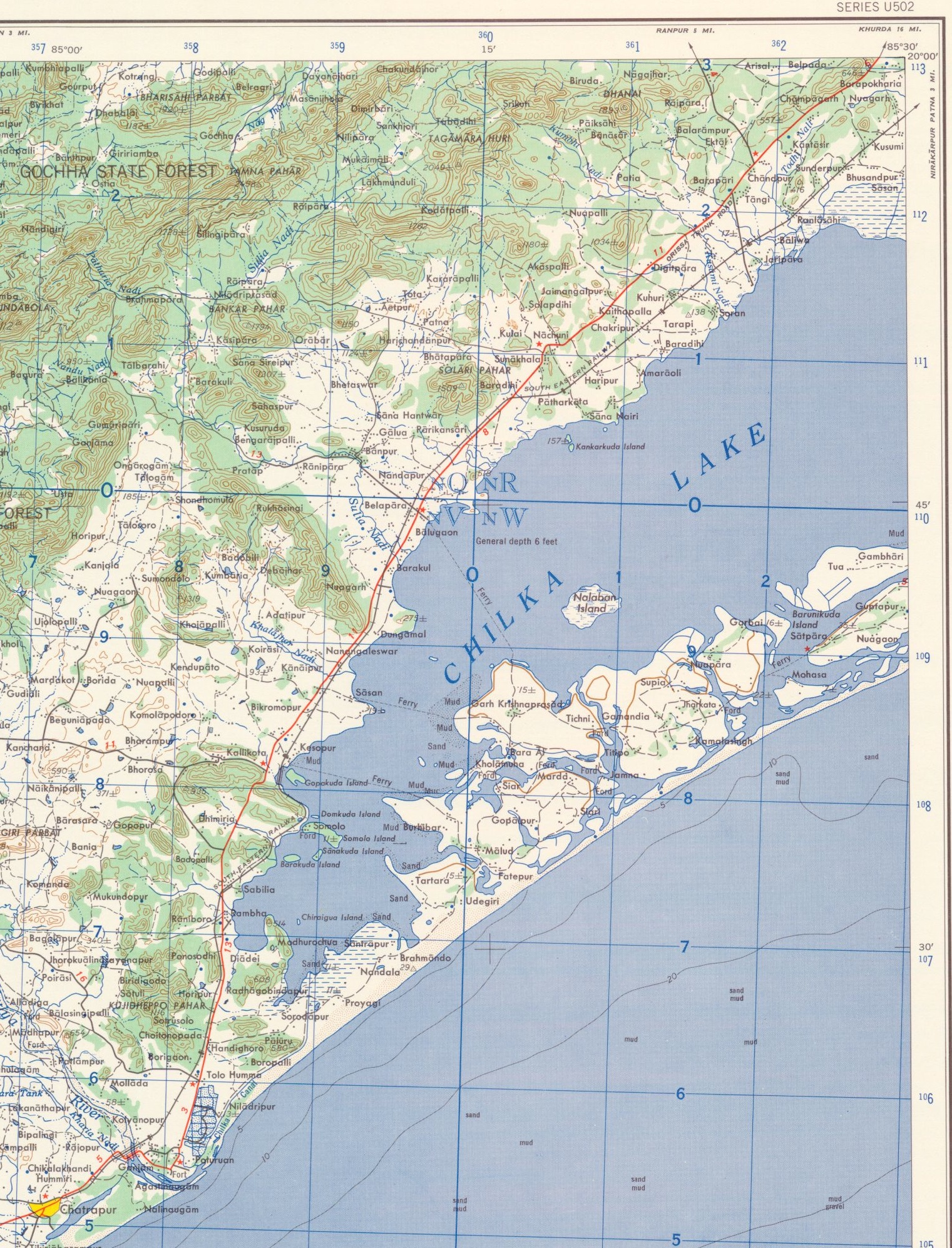
Map of the coastline around Chilka Lake

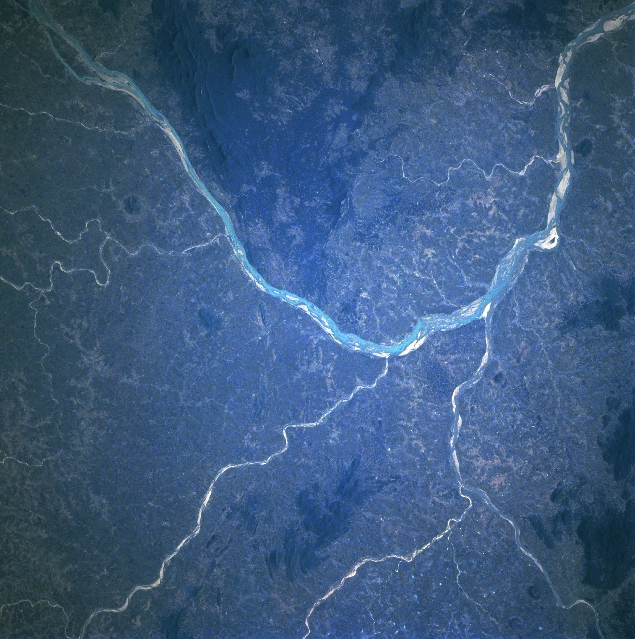
Satellite view of the Mahanadi River near Subarnapur, in Subarnapur district of Odisha. Here the Mahanadi curves around the Garhjat Hills before entering the Utkal Plains.

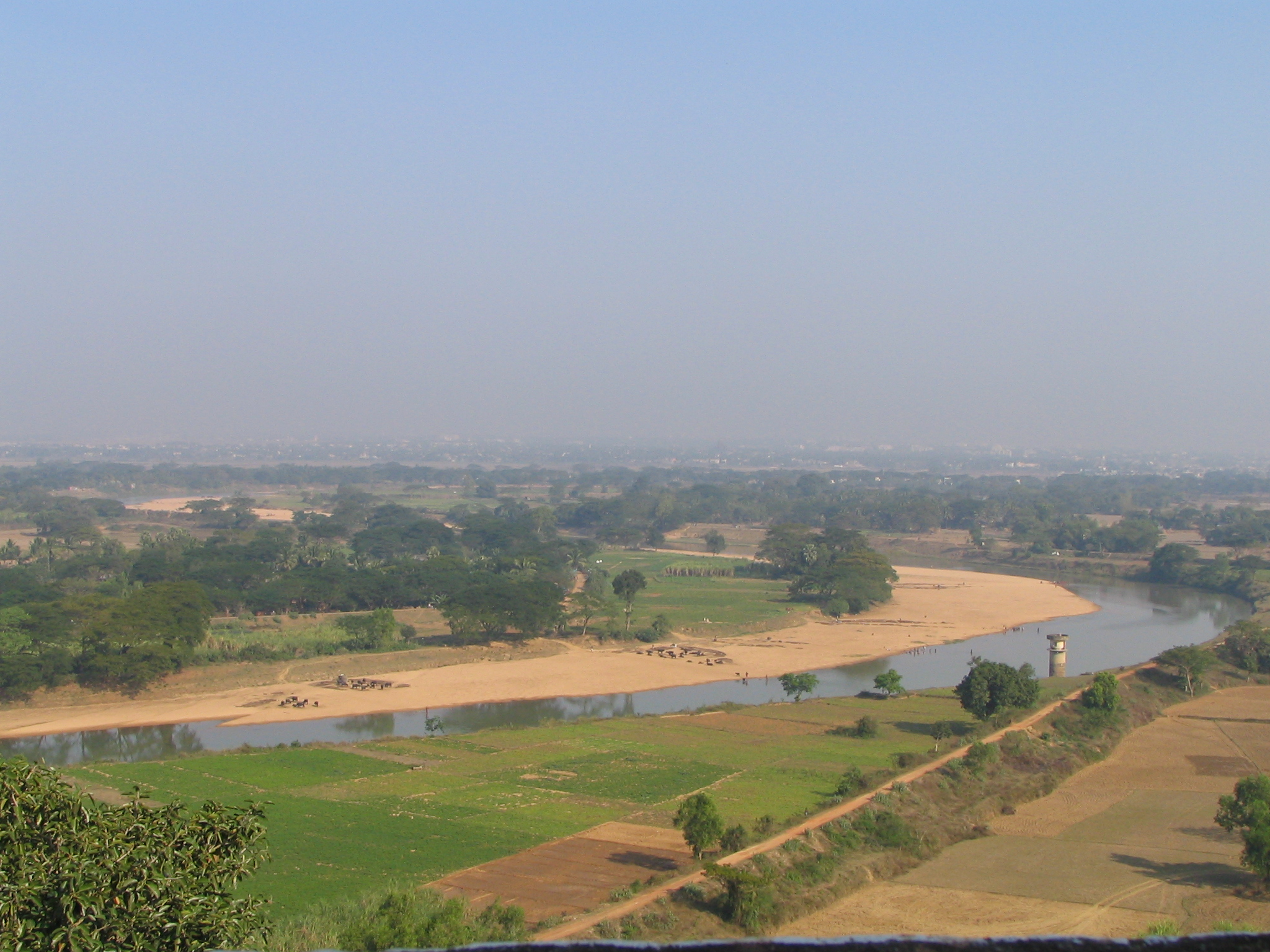
View of the banks of the Daya River from a top Dhauli Hills, the presumed venue of the Kalinga War.

Odisha (formerly known as Orissa) is one of the 28 states in the Republic of India. Odisha is located in the eastern part of the Indian peninsula and the Bay of Bengal lies to its East while Chhattisgarh shares its border in the west and north-west. The state also shares geographic boundaries with West Bengal in the north-east, Jharkhand in the north and Andhra Pradesh in the south. The state is spread over an area of 1,55,707 km^{2} and extends for 700 km from north to south and 500 kilometres from east to west. Odisha has a coastline of 574.71 km along the Bay of Bengal. According to a report based on surveys by the National Hydrographic Office (NHO) and Survey of India, the state's coastline length was revised from the earlier estimate of 476.4 km. The state is divided into 30 districts which are further subdivided into 314 blocks called tahasil.

Physiographically, Odisha consists of coastal plains, central plateaus, central hilly regions, flood plains, and uplands. About a third of the state has a green cover.

Mahanadi is the largest river of the state and its catchment area covers 42% of the state. There are several other significant rivers that flow through the state such as the Subarnarekha, the Brahmani, the Baitarani, and the Vansadhara.

Chilika Lake, located on the east coast of the state is one of the world's largest brackish water lagoons. Besides that there are several other lakes in the state such as Anshupa, Tampara, and Kanjia.

Geologically the state is home to some of the oldest rocks of the world. Odisha also consists of two cratons (e.g. North Odisha Craton and Western Odisha Craton), which are sedimentary formations from the Cretaceous period. They are found in many places and are home to coal deposits. The coasts are made up predominantly of deltaic sediments of Mahanadi, Brahmani, Baitarani, Subarnarekha rivers of Quaternary age.

== Overview ==
Odisha topography consists of fertile coastal plains to the east bounded by Bay of Bengal. Mountainous highlands and plateau regions occupy the center of the state. Western and northwestern portions of the state consist of rolling uplands. The state also has some major floodplains encompassing the river systems.

The western and northern portions of the state are part of the Chota Nagpur plateau. The coasts composed of fertile alluvial plains and the valleys of the Mahanadi, Brahmani, and Baitarani rivers, which empty into the Bay of Bengal.

31.41% of Odisha has forest cover. There are many wildlife sanctuaries in Odisha. The Simlipal National Park is a national park and tiger reserve with a huge expanse of lush green forests with waterfalls and is inhabited by tigers, elephants, and other wildlife. The Bhitarkanika Wildlife Sanctuary, also a national park, has been protecting estuarine crocodiles since 1975.

Chilka Lake, a brackish water coastal lake on the Bay of Bengal, south of the mouth of the Mahanadi River, is the largest coastal lake in India. It is protected by the Chilka Lake Bird Sanctuary, which harbors over 150 migratory and resident species of birds.

The highest mountain peak in the state is Deomali (1672 m), which is situated in Koraput district in southern Odisha. It is also one of the tallest peaks of the Eastern Ghats. Deomali is part of the Chandragiri-Pottangi mountain subsystem.

== Location ==
The state of Odisha extends from 17.31N latitude to 22.31N latitude and from 81.31E longitude to 87.29E longitude.

== Physical divisions ==
=== Physiography ===
Odisha can be divided into five major Physiographic regions based on continuity, homogeneity, and other physiographic characteristics:

1. Utkal Plains or the coastal plains of the east
2. The central plateaus
3. The central mountainous and highlands region
4. The western rolling uplands, and
5. The main flood plains

==== Odisha Coastal Plains ====
The Odisha Coastal Plains or Utkal Plains are the sedimentary landforms of recent origin. Geologically, they belong to the Paleogene and Neogene ages (approximately 65 to 2.6 million years ago). Their western boundary is at around 250 feet east ghats, and they have a nearly straight shoreline in east. This region stretches from the Subarnarekha basin in the north to the Rushikulya basin in the south.

A major part of this region is formed by deltas of the six major rivers i.e. the Mahanadi, the Brahmani, the Budhabalanga, the Subarnarekha, the Baitarani, and the Rushikulya. This has given rise to the names such as the "Gift of Six Rivers" or the "Hexadeltaic region". It spans along the coast of the Bay of Bengal with the maximum width near the Mahanadi Delta (the Middle Coastal Plain). It is narrower in the Northern Coastal Plain in Baleshwar District (also called Balasore Plain) and narrowest in the Southern Coastal Plain in Ganjam District (called Ganjam Plain).

The North Coastal Plain is made up of the deltas of the Budhabalanga and the Subarnarekha, The widest and largest area is the Middle Coastal Plain which comprises the deltas of the Mahanadi, Brahmani, and Baitarani rivers. This region hosts a number of lakes and there is evidence of past 'back bays'. The South Coastal Plain consists of the lacustrine plain of Chilika Lake and the Rushikulya River delta.

==== Middle mountainous and highlands region ====
The middle mountainous and highlands region is the largest of the geographic regions and covers about three-fourths of the state. The region mostly comprises the hills and mountains of the Eastern Ghats which rise sharply in the east and slope gradually to the eroded plateaus in the west running from north-west (Mayurbhanj) to the south-west (Malkangiri). Geologically the formation is quite old. It is a part of the Indian Peninsula, which was a part of the ancient landmass of Gondwanaland. The rivers of Odisha and their tributaries have cut deep and narrow valleys in this region. The Odisha highlands are also known as the Garhjat Hills. This region is well marked by a number of watersheds. A number of river valleys of varying width and flood plains dissect the Eastern Ghats in this region. The average height of this region is about 900 meters above the mean sea level. The highest peak is Deomali.

==== Central plateaus ====
The plateaus are part of the western slopes of the Eastern Ghats. They are mostly eroded plateaus with elevation varying from 305 to 610 meters. There are two broad plateaus: (i) the Panposh-Keonjhar Pallahara plateau comprises the Upper Baitarani catchment basin in the northern part of the state, and (ii) the Nabrangpur-Jeypore plateau comprises the Sabari basin in the southern part of the state.

==== Western rolling uplands ====
The western rolling uplands have heights varying from 153 metres to 305 metres. These are lower in elevation than the plateaus.

It consists of the following geographically distinct uplands.

1. The Rairangpur rolling upland - This region encompasses the northern part of the Mayurbhanj district. The uplands are a part of the Subarnarekha basin, and slope towards the north.
2. The Keonjhar rolling upland - This region is part of Kendujhar district and lies at the edge of the Keonjhar Plateau. It is part of the Baitarani River basin.
3. The Rourkela rolling upland - This is part of the Sundergarh district and lies on the Upper Brahmani basin.
4. The Bolangir-Bargarh-Rairkhol rolling upland - This is part of multiple districts and lies on the Upper Mahanadi and its tributaries basin.
5. The Aska rolling upland - This is situated in Ganjam District on the Upper Rushikulya basin.
6. The Rayagada rolling upland - This upland is part of the Rayagada district and lies on the Nagavali and the Vansadhara river basins.
7. The Malkangiri rolling upland - Located on the southern tip of Odisha, this upland is situated on the Sabari-Machhkund basins of the Dandakaranya Region.

==== Major Flood Plains ====
These floodplains are formed due to major rivers in the highlands, uplands, and plateaus. The height varies from 75 to 153m. The nine major floodplains of Odisha are:

1. Baripada flood plain
2. Anandapur flood plain
3. Talcher flood plain
4. Bhuban flood plain
5. Sonepur flood plain
6. Athagarh flood plain
7. Aska flood plain
8. Rayagada flood plain
9. Malkangiri flood plain

== Geology ==
The geology of Odisha is complex and varied. The state is home to some of the oldest rock formations on the planet. The second oldest rocks on the planet were found in Champua, Kendujhar which are 4.2 billion years old. Odisha is part of two cratonic blocks called North Orissa Craton and the West Orissa Craton. There is a third block called the Eastern Ghats Granulite Belt. It has been considered as a ‘mobile belt’ during the middle Proterozoic Era. These formations are separated from each other by deep-seated regional fault boundaries. The fault boundaries are called the north Orissa boundary fault (running along Mahanadi Valley - also called the 'Mahanadi Rift') and the west Orissa boundary fault.

The North Orissa Craton comprises extensive banded iron formations, granite intrusives, and undeformed volcano-sedimentary assemblages belonging to the Archaean to-early Proterozoic times. They are followed by folded limestone-bearing rock formations of the Proterozoic age.

The West Orissa Craton is underlain by occurrences of granites of the Archaean age and undeformed limestone-bearing platform sediments of the Proterozoic age. Small occurrences of Archaean banded iron formations and greenstones can also be found.

The Eastern Ghats Granulite Belt is mainly composed of Khondalite formations and moderately extensive charnockites, granites, migmatites, and local pegmatites formations covering approximately 52000 km^{2}. Occurrences of anorthosites, alkaline rocks and chromite-bearing ultramafic rocks are found close to the boundaries of the block. The name Khondalite is derived from the Khond tribe who inhabit Odisha.

The similarity of lithology, tectono thermal events, and major rift features, e.g. the Mahanadi rift, place Odisha close to Eastern Antarctica.

Later geological formations such as Gondwana basins are also found in Odisha. The Mahanadi Master Basin holds a major part of the Gondwana basins of Odisha. Gondwana sediments are exposed in sedimentary basins found in Ib River valley, Talcher, Katringia, Gaisilat, Athmallik, Chhatrapur, and Athgarh. These deposits are estimated to be ranging from early Permian to Early Cretaceous in age. Most of the coal deposits of Odisha are found in this region.

The East Coast Odisha is made up predominantly of deltaic sediments of Mahanadi, Brahmani, Baitarani, Subarnarekha rivers, besides aeolian and marine patches. The eastern coastline Odisha originated in the post-Cretaceous era and was modified appreciably during the Quaternary due to the growth of river deltas and the effects of glaciation and deglaciation. The Quaternary sediments of the east coast of Odisha are composed of laterites and unconsolidated clays, silts, sands, and gravels.

== Forests ==
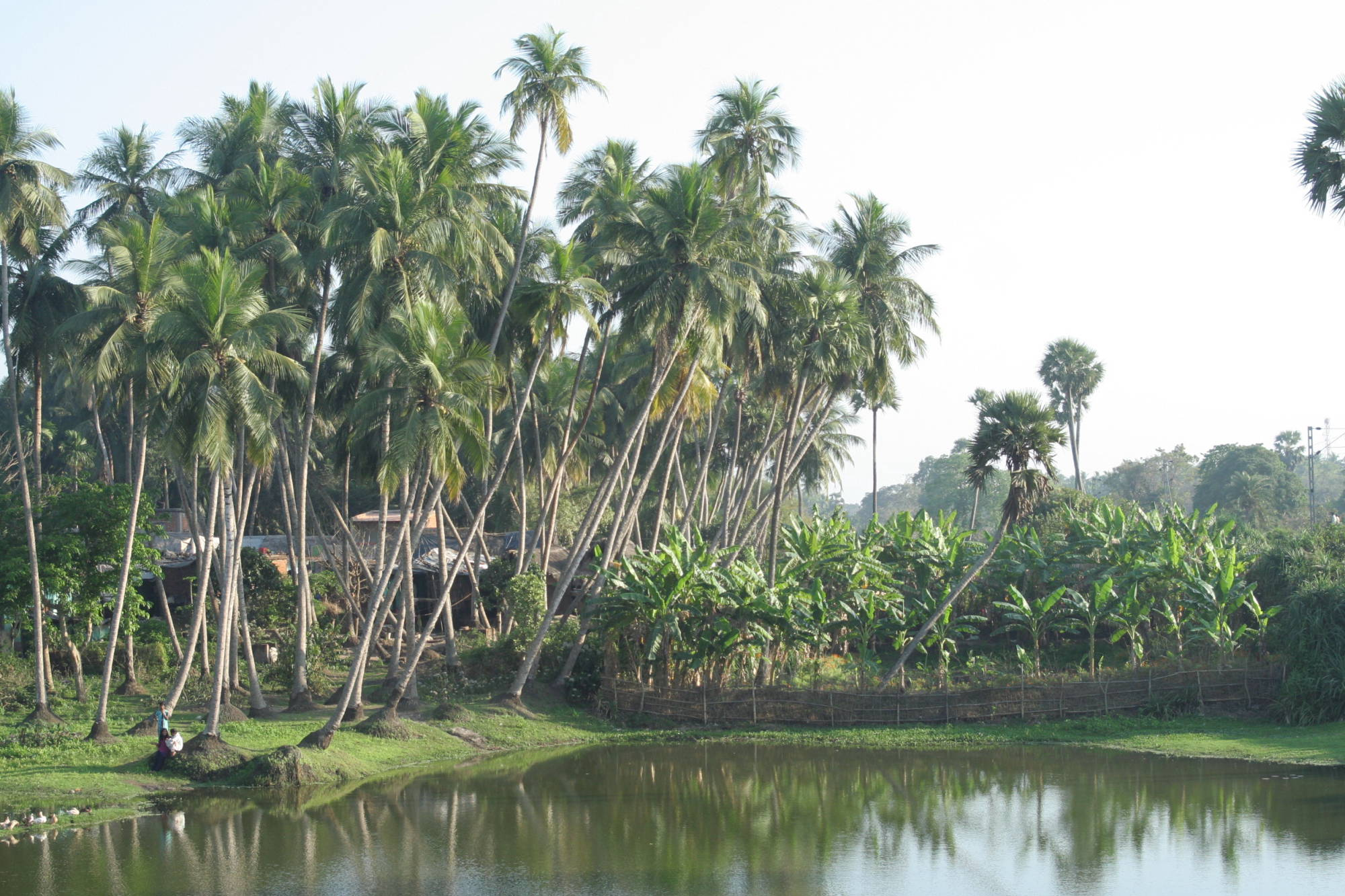
Forest cover in Raghurajpur.

Almost one-third of Odisha is covered by forests which make up about 37.34% of the total land area of the state. These forests cover most of southern and western Odisha. The eastern plains adjacent to the coast are covered by farmlands. The forest cover of Odisha extends over an area of 58,136.869 square kilometres out of which reserve forests make up an area of 26,329.12 square kilometres (10,165.73 square miles), demarcated protected forests make up 11,687.079 square kilometres (4,512.406 square miles)mi) and undemarcated protected forests make up 3,638.78 square kilometres (1,404.94 square miles)mi). Other types of forests make up 16,261.34 square kilometres (6,278.54 square miles)mi) while unclassed forests make up 20.55 square kilometres (7.93 square miles)mi) of the total forest cover. The State Government of Odisha also classifies forests based on their density. About 538 square kilometres (208 square miles)mi) of land are classified as very dense forests with a canopy density of over 70 percent, 27,656 square kilometres (10,678 square miles)mi) of forests are classified as moderately dense cover with a canopy density of 40 to 70 percent and 20,180 square kilometres (7,790 square miles)mi) of land are classified as open forest with a canopy density of 10 to 40 percent.

== Rivers ==
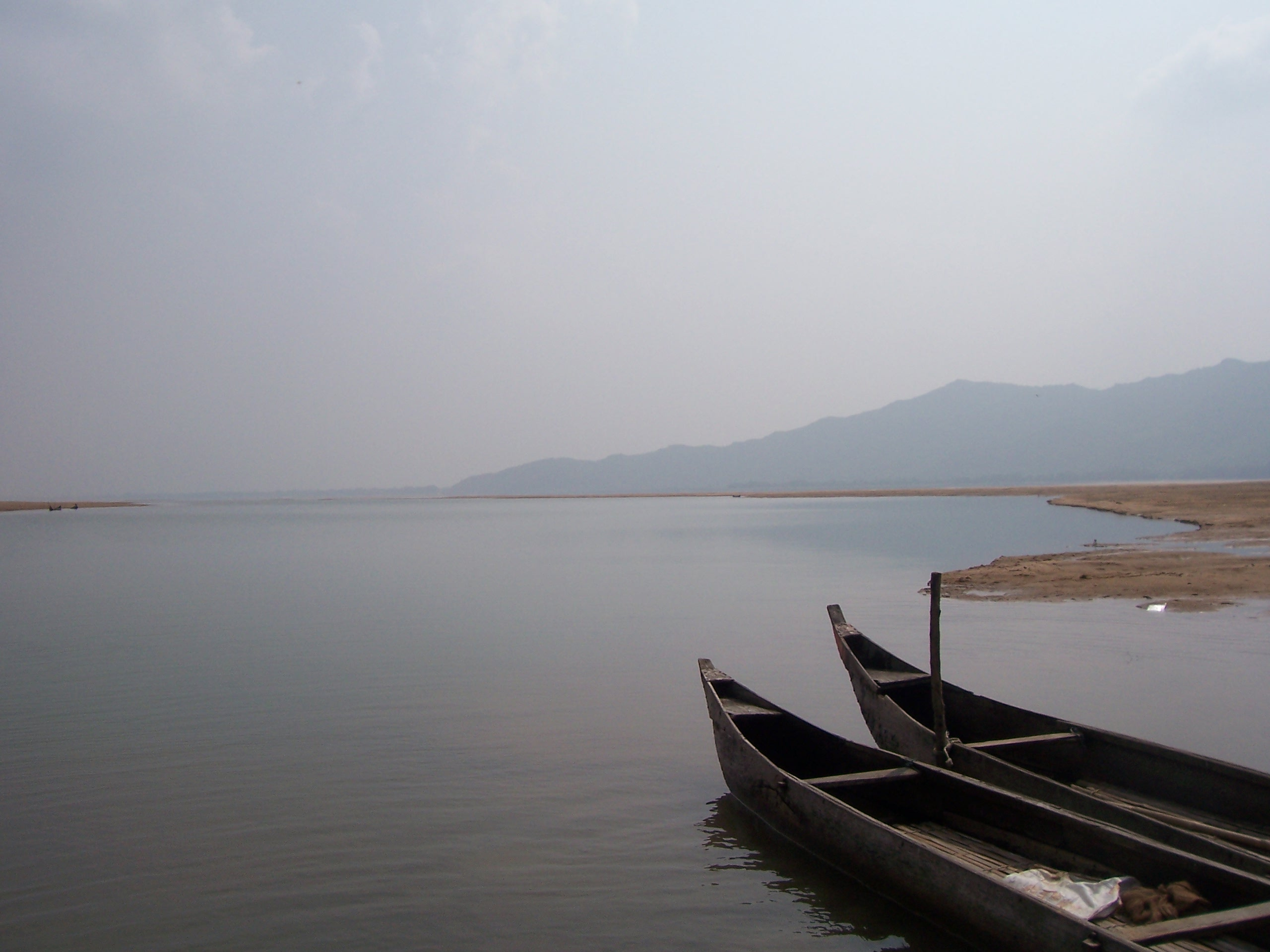
Mahanadi river

Most of the major rivers of Odisha flow eastwards and ultimately empty into the Bay of Bengal. However, depending on the source they can be distinguished into four groups:

- Rivers that originate outside Odisha (the Brahmani, the Subarnarekha, the Ib, and the Mahanadi).
- Rivers originating in Odisha (the Baitarani, the Budhabalanga, the Salandi, and the Rushikulya).
- Rivers which originate inside Odisha, but flow through other states (the Bahuda, the Vamsadhara River, and the Nagavali River).
- Rivers which originate inside Odisha, but are tributaries of rivers which flow through other states (the Machkund, the Sileru River, the Kolab, and the Indravati River).

=== The Mahanadi ===
The Mahanadi is the biggest river of Odisha and the sixth largest in India. Its exact origin is not known but the farthest headwater can be found on the Sihawa hills of the Bastar Plateau in Dhamtari district of Chhattisgarh. It is about 851 km long (494 km in Odisha) and its catchment area spreads over 141,600 km^{2}, out of which 65,580 km^{2} (42% of area of the state) lies in Odisha. The river carries on an average about 92,600 million m of water. Inside Odisha boundaries, Mahanadi's Tributaries include the Ib, The Ong, and the Tel.

Tel River is one of the largest rivers of Odisha. Originating near Jharigaon in Nabarangpur district and flowing through Kalahandi, Balangir, Sonepur districts of Odisha and finally merging with Mahanadi near Sonepur. It travels 296 km and has a catchment area of 22818 km^{2}. The river Udanti is a tributary to Tel. It originates from Chhatishgarh and flows through Kalahandi and Nuapada districts and merges with the Tel river.

Ib River originates in the hills near Pandrapet at an elevation of 762 metres (2,500 ft). It passes through the Raigarh and Jashpur districts of Chhattisgarh, Jharsuguda and Sundargarh districts of Odisha, and finally meets Mahanadi at Hirakud. It travels 251 km and has a catchment area of 12,447 km^{2}.

Ong River flows across Odisha and joins Mahanadi 240 km upstream of Sonepur where Tel merges. The river travels 204 km before it meets Mahanadi. It drains an area of about 5,128 km^{2}.

Besides these three rivers, the Mahanadi has tributaries in Chatishgarh, namely the Seonath, the Hasdeo, the Jonk and the Mand. Mahanadi branches off around Naraj Bridge which is approx. 10 km from Cuttack City, creating River Kathajodi and Birupa. The Birupa merges with the Brahmani and Kathajodi splits into multiple streams.

=== The Brahmani ===
The Brahmani is the second largest river of the state. Two major rivers from the Chota Nagpur Plateau of Jharkhand, the Sankh and the South Koel merge at Veda Vyasa near Rourkela in Sundargarh district forming the Brahmani. It flows through the Eastern Ghats in Sundargarh, Deogarh, Dhenkanal, and Jajpur districts. When it enters Jajpur, it creates a distributary, the Kharasua, near Jenapur, and the Kelua near Barabati . Both distributaries re-merge with the Brahmani while it enters Kendrapara and into the Coastal Plains. Afterwards it enters into the Bay of Bengal along with a combined mouth with the Baitarani near Dhamara, Bhadrak. The Brahmani is 799 km long (541 km in Odisha) and its catchment area spreads over 39,033 km^{2} in Odisha.

=== The Baitarani ===
The Baitarani originates from the Gonasika in the Guptaganga hills of the Kendujhar district. It is approximately 360 km long and its catchment area spread over 12,790 km^{2}. It enters into the Bay of Bengal after joining the Brahmani River at the Dhamara mouth near Chandbali, Bhadrak.

The Salandi is a major tributary of Baitarani. It originates from the Meghasani Hills of the Similipal Mountain range in Mayurbhanj district. It is 144 km long with a catchment area of 1,793 km^{2}.

=== The Subarnarekha ===
Subarnarekha is a rain-fed river that originates near Nagri village on the Chhotanagpur plateau of Jharkhand. It has the smallest river basin of the major rivers among India. It flows through major towns of Jharkhand and then enters Odisha. It is 433 km (70 km in Odisha) and has a catchment area of 19,500 km (3,200 km in Odisha) with a mean annual flow of 7,900 million. It ultimately joins the Bay of Bengal at Kirtania Port in Odisha.

=== The Budhabalanga ===
It originates from the eastern slopes of the Similipal mountain range. It is about 164 km long having a total catchment area of 4,840 km^{2} with an annual flow of 2,177 million. Its major tributaries are the Palapala, the Sunei, the Kalo, the Sanjo, the Deo, the Gangahari, and the Katra. It flows through districts of Mayurbhanj and Balasore and ultimately drains into the Bay Of Bengal near Balaramgadi.

=== The Rushikulya ===
It originates from the Rushimala hills of the Eastern Ghats in the Kandhamal district. It is 165 km long with 8,900 km^{2} of catchment areas. Its tributaries are the Baghua and the Dhanei Badanadi. It has no delta at its mouth.

=== The Bahuda ===
The Bahuda river originates near village Luba from the Singharaj hills the Eastern Ghats in Gajapati district. It flows in a northeasterly direction up to 55 km. Then it changes direction to south-east and flows for 17 km inside Odisha before entering Andhra Pradesh to flow for further 18 km. Then it again turns in a northeasterly direction for 6 km in Odisha before meeting the Bay of Bengal near the village Sunapurapeta, Odisha. Its total length is 96 km with 78 km inside Odisha. It has a catchment area of 1118 km^{2}, out of which 890 km^{2} lies inside Odisha.

=== The Vanshadhara ===
The Vanshadhara originates in Kalahandi district from the Durgakangar hills of the Eastern Ghats. It is 230 km long out of which 150 km flows in Odisha. It merges into the Bay of Bengal at Kalingapatnam in Andhra Pradesh. It has a catchment area of 1,400 km^{2} in Odisha. The main tributaries of the Vansadhara are Pedagada, Bengigedda on the right and Chuladhua Nalla, Pondaka Nalla, Harabhangi, Sananadi, and Mahendratanya situated on left.

=== The Nagavali ===
It originates from the Bijipur hills of the Eastern Ghats in Kalahandi district. It is 217 km long out of which 125 km is in Odisha and rest flows through Andhra Pradesh. It has a total catchment area of about 9,410 km^{2}. Its main tributaries are Pitadar Nalla, Datteibannda Nallah, Sananadi, BarhaNadi, Baldiya Nadi, Sat Nallha, Sitagura Nallha, Ghora Nalla, Sitaghera Nalla, Srikona Nadi, Bonamarha Nadi, Errigeda Nallha, and Jhanjhabati river.

=== The Indravati ===
It originates from the Eastern Ghats in Kalahandi districts. It flows in a westerly direction and enters Chhattisgarh and ultimately flows into the Godavari. It is 530 km long with a catchment area of 41,700 km^{2} as a tributary it flows into the Godavari river.

=== The Kolab ===
It originates from the Sinkaran hills of the Eastern Ghats in Koraput districts. Thereafter it flows through Andhra Pradesh and converges with the Godavari. It has catchment areas of 20,400 km^{2}. The Kolab water project is situated in this river

== Springs ==
There are a number of mountain springs and hot springs in Odisha. The Badaghagara and Sanaghagara in Keonjhar district, Saptasajya in Dhenkanal district, Chandikhole in Jajpur district, Barunei in Khorda district, Taptapani, Narayani, Nirmalajhar in Ganjam district, the Patalaganga in Kalahandi district, Nursinghanath in Bargarh district, and Harisankar of Balangir district of Odisha. A few of the major springs are as per below.

Name of the springs	Rivers / tributaries, etc.	Type	Location
Chandikhole	A tributary to Mahanadi	Natural spring	Chandikhole
Barunei	Tributary to the Daya	Natural spring	Khurda
Narayani	Draining to Chilika	Natural spring	Puri
Nirmal Jhar	Draining to Chilika	Natural spring	Khalikot
Pradhanpat	A tributary to the Brahmani	Natural spring	Deogarh
Phurligharan	A tributary to the Indravati	Natural spring	Bhawanipatna
Khandadhar	A tributary to the Brahmani	Natural spring	Bonei
Nurshingh Nath	A tributary to the Tel	Natural spring	Balangir
Harishankar	Jira river, a tributary to Tel	Natural spring	Bolangir
Gosinga Jhar	Kuaria Nala, a tributary to the Mahanadi	Natural spring	Kantilo
Koiliharan	A tributary to the Mahanadi	Natural spring	Jharsuguda
Jharbada	Mankada river a tributary to the Brahmani	Natural spring	Malaygiri, Dhenkanal
Atri	-	Natural hot spring	Khurda
Taptapani	-	Natural hot spring	Ganjam
Deulijhari	-	Natural hot spring	Athamallik

== Waterfalls ==
Most of the rivers of Odisha traverse through mountainous terrain. So they have waterfalls either at the point of origin or over the mountainous bed. Some major waterfalls of the state are:

Name of Waterfall	Rivers /tributary etc.	Height	Location
Putudi	River Salunki, a tributary to Mahanadi	60 ft (18 m)	Phulbani
Bada Ghagra	Machhakandana river, a tributary to the Baitarani	200 ft (61 m)	Kendujhar
San Ghagra	Machhakandana river, a tributary to the Baitarani	100 ft (30 m)	Kendujhar
Khandadhar	A tributary to the Brahamani	500 ft (150 m)	Kendujhar
Bhimkund	The Baitarani		Kendujhar
Barehipani	Budhabalanga	1,309 ft (399 m)	Mayurbhanj
Joranda	Budhabalanga	490 ft (150 m)	Mayurbhanj
Debakunda		50 ft (15 m)	Mayurbhanj
Pradhanpat	A tributary of the Brahamani	30 ft (9.1 m)	Deogarh
Phurlijharan	A tributary of the Indravati	49 ft (15 m)	Bhawanipatna, Kalahandi
Dokaridhara	200 ft (61 m)	Kalahandi	
Bhanyaraghumara		150 ft (46 m)	Kalahandi
Rabandhara		45 ft (14 m)	Kalahandi
Khandadhar	Korapani Nala, a tributary of the Brahamani	801 ft (244 m)	Bonei, Sundergarh
Nrushingh Nath(Bhimdhar)	A tributary of the Tel		Bargarh
Harishankar	Jira river, a tributary of the Tel		Bolangir
Koilighugar	Ahiraj, a tributary of the Mahanadi	200 ft (61 m)	Jharsuguda
Duduma	Machakund river a tributary of the Godavari	574 ft (175 m)	Koraput
Gandahati	Mahendratanaya	65 ft (20 m)	Gajapati

== Lakes ==
- The Chilika Lake is brackish water lagoon located in the southern part of the Odisha coastal plain. It is India's largest coastal lagoon and spread across the districts of Ganjam, Khurda and Puri. Its area varies 900 km^{2} and 1165 km^{2}; during the two monsoon months it is 71 km long and 32 km wide. Its salinity decreases to a minimum during the monsoon. However, in winter, due to the overflow of the tidal water through the narrow opening from the Bay of Bengal, the lake reaches its maximum height. It is a Ramsar Convention protected wetland and hosts around 33 species of migratory and local birds.
- Anshupa is a fresh water horseshoe lake located at Athagarh in Cuttack district within the alluvial plain of river Mahanadi. It is 3 km long and 1.5 km wide.
- Sara is a fresh water lake located near Puri. It is 5 km long and 3 km wide. Four distributaries of Mahanadi River system, the Bhargavi, the Kushabhadra, the Mugei and the Dhanua drain into the lake
- Kanjia lake is another fresh water lake with about 134 acres (0.54 km^{2}) of area located in Nandankanan of Khorda district near Bhubaneswar.
- Tampara is another fresh water lake located alongside the town of Chatrapur. It is 4 km long and 0.5 km wide. It is feed by the backwater of Rushikulya river in monsoon season.

Artificial water reservoirs

- Hirakud Dam: Artificial Lake in Sambalpur and Jharsuguda largest artificial lake in Asia.
- Indravati Dam: Artificial Lake in Kalahandi and Nabarangpur.
- Kolab Dam: Artificial Lake in Koraput.
