= List of waterfalls in Odisha by height =

The following is a list of highest waterfalls in Odisha. It is based on data from World Waterfall Database.

== List ==
Waterfall	Height	Location	Remarks	Single drop
Barehipani Falls	399 metres (1,309 ft)	Mayurbhanj district, Odisha	2 tiered waterfalls	
Khandadhar Falls	244 metres (801 ft)	Sundergarh district, Odisha	Horse tail type falls	Yes
Joranda Falls	181 metres (594 ft)	Mayurbhanj district, Odisha	plunge type waterfalls	Yes
Duduma Falls	157 metres (515 ft)	Border of Koraput & Visakhapatnam districts of Odisha and Andhra Pradesh states	plunge type waterfalls	Yes
Khandadhar Falls, Kendujhar	152 metres (499 ft)	Kendujhar district, Odisha	plunge type waterfalls	Yes
Koilighugar Waterfall	61 metres (200 ft)	Jharsuguda district, Odisha	plunge type waterfalls	Yes
Badaghagara Waterfall	60 metres (200 ft)	Kendujhar district, Odisha	plunge type waterfalls	Yes
Sanaghagara Waterfall	30.5 metres (100 ft)	Kendujhar district, Odisha	plunge type waterfalls	
Phurlijharan	15 metres (49 ft)	Kalahandi district, Odisha	plunge type waterfalls	Yes
