= Kuldiha Wildlife Sanctuary =

Wildlife sanctuary in Odisha, India

- କୁଲଡିହା ବନ୍ୟଜନ୍ତୁ ସଂରକ୍ଷଣାଳୟ
- IUCN category IV (habitat/species management area)
- Location within Odisha
- Interactive map of Kuldiha Wildlife Sanctuary
- Nearest city: Balasore
- Coordinates: 21.20°N 86.3°E
- Area: 272.75 km^{2} (105.31 sq mi)
- Designated: 4 January 1984
- Visitors: 6340 (in 2015)
- Governing body: Ministry of Environment, Forest and Climate Change, Government of Odisha
- Website: www.kuldihatourism.com www.wildlife.odisha.gov.in/protectedareas/ProtectedareasKuldiha

The Kuldiha Wildlife Sanctuary (Odia: କୁଲଡିହା ବନ୍ୟଜନ୍ତୁ ଅଭୟାରଣ୍ୟ) is located at the Balasore district of Odisha, India. The sanctuary is spread across 272.75 km^{2} (105 sq mi) in the Eastern Ghats. It is connected with Simlipal National Park via the Sukhupada and Nato hill ranges.

== Geography ==
Important locations of Similipal biosphere
WS: Wildlife Sanctuary, WR: Water Reservoir, HT: Hill Top, O: Other importance
Note: Owing to space constraints in the small map, the actual locations in a larger map may vary slightly

Kuldiha was officially declared a sanctuary on 4 January 1984. It is located in Kuldiha and is known for the Mayurbhanj Elephant Reserve (locally known as Tenda Elephant Reserve) which spreads across Simlipal, Kuldiha, and Hadgarh wildlife reserves.

Aside from being an environmental reserve, the sanctuary offers night-stay accommodation at Kuldiha entrance, Jadachua, and Rishia in the form of huts, tents, and concrete houses. A watch tower at Garsimulia allows for wildlife observation, but is typically closed during the peak monsoon season due to heavy rains and flooding.

In early 2012, a major fire was reported to have engulfed both Simlipal and Kuldiha forests, causing significant damage to their flora and fauna. In the following year, on 2 August 2013, the Ministry of Environment, Forest and Climate Change (MoEFCC) declared the sanctuary an ecologically sensitive zone.

== Flora and fauna ==
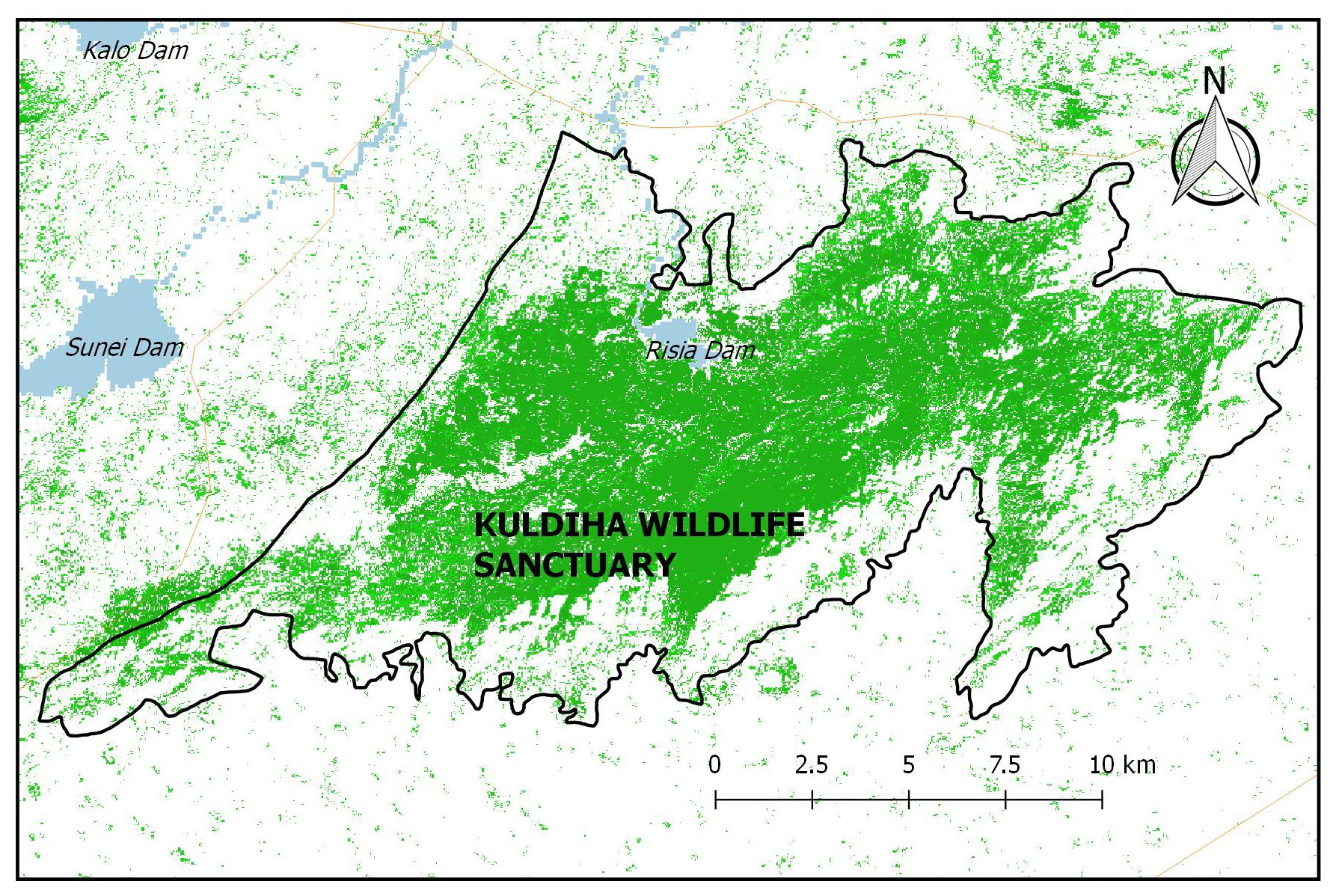
Kuldiha Wildlife Sanctuary map. Green and blue colors show forest cover and water bodies, respectively.

The sanctuary is primarily composed of dense forests featuring sishu, sal, piyasal, mango, bahera, jamun, and simul trees. There are also 24 different species of orchid discovered so far. The fauna includes wild cats, elephants, long-tailed monkeys, leopards, gaurs, and giant squirrels. Bird species include peafowl, hill mynas, and hornbills.

== Tourism ==
Odisha's government operates the Kuldiha sanctuary as a community-based PPP model with an ecotourism focus.

== See also ==
- Indian Council of Forestry Research and Education
- Panchalingeshwar
- Wildlife sanctuaries of India
