= Hadgarh Wildlife Sanctuary =

Wildlife sanctuary in Odisha, India

- IUCN category IV (habitat/species management area)
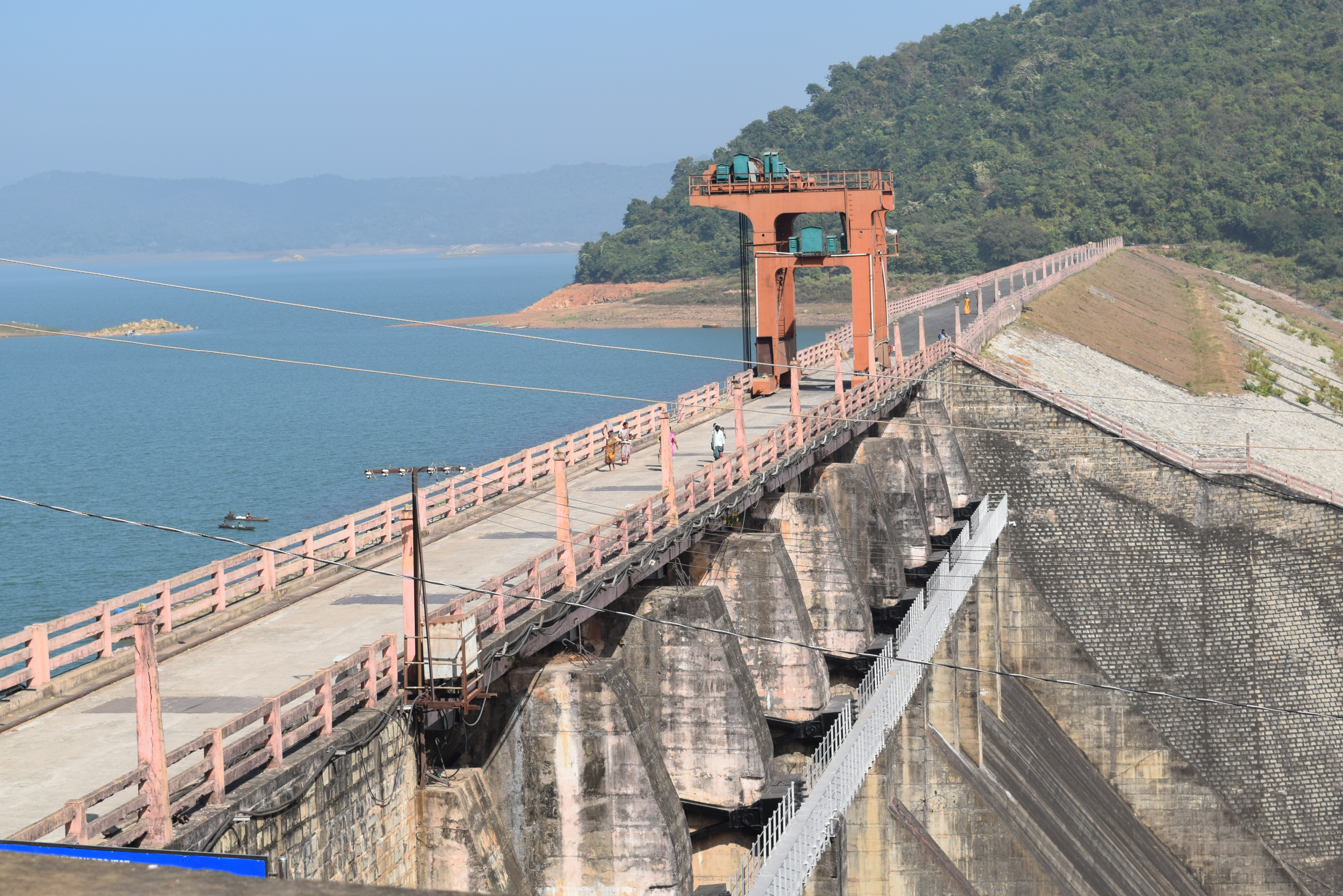
- Hadgarh dam on river Salandi

- Location within Odisha Location within India
- Interactive map of Hadgarh Wildlife Sanctuary
- Nearest city: Bhadrak
- Coordinates: 21.289335°N 86.320443°E
- Area: 191.05 km^{2} (73.76 sq mi)
- Designation: Wildlife Sanctuary
- Designated: 3 December 1978
- Governing body: Divisional Forest Officer, Kendujhar Division, Kendujhar district, Ministry of Forest and Environment, Government of Odisha
- Website: www.wildlife.odisha.gov.in/WebPortal/PA_Hadgarh.aspx

Hadgarh Wildlife Sanctuary is a wildlife sanctuary situated in Keonjhar district in Odisha, India, covering an area of 191 km^{2} was established in 1978.

== History ==
The Hadgarh wildlife sanctuary was declared vide F.F.A.H. notification dated 6 December 1978 S.R.O. No.213/80 – In exercise of powers conferred by Section 18 of the Wildlife (Protection) Act, 1972 (53 of 1972), the State Government. Executive orders declared the most important and large forest blocks as reserved forests during the 1910–1915 settlement operation. Forest blocks, i.e., Benamunda, Bandhanjhari, and Ranibeda, were reserved during 1925–26. The proposal for constituting Hadagarh sanctuary was initiated during 1976–77 when the task force committee on crocodile farming in Orissa decided to release the mugger (freshwater crocodile) in the reservoir of Salandi dam (Hadagarh) because of favorable climatic conditions for that species. It was decided to declare the reservoir and peripheral forests under Anandapur and Karanjia Forest Division as sanctuary and suspend the rights of local people under the Wildlife (Protection) Act 1972. Thus the Hadagarh sanctuary came into existence by notification no. SF (W) - 160/78- 34113/FFAH dated 6.12.78 of Forest Department, Orissa.

== Geography ==
Important location of Similipal Biosphere
WS: Wildlife Sanctuary, WR: Water Reservoir, HT: Hill Top, O: Other Importance
Note: Owing to space constraints in the small map, the actual locations in a larger map may vary slightly

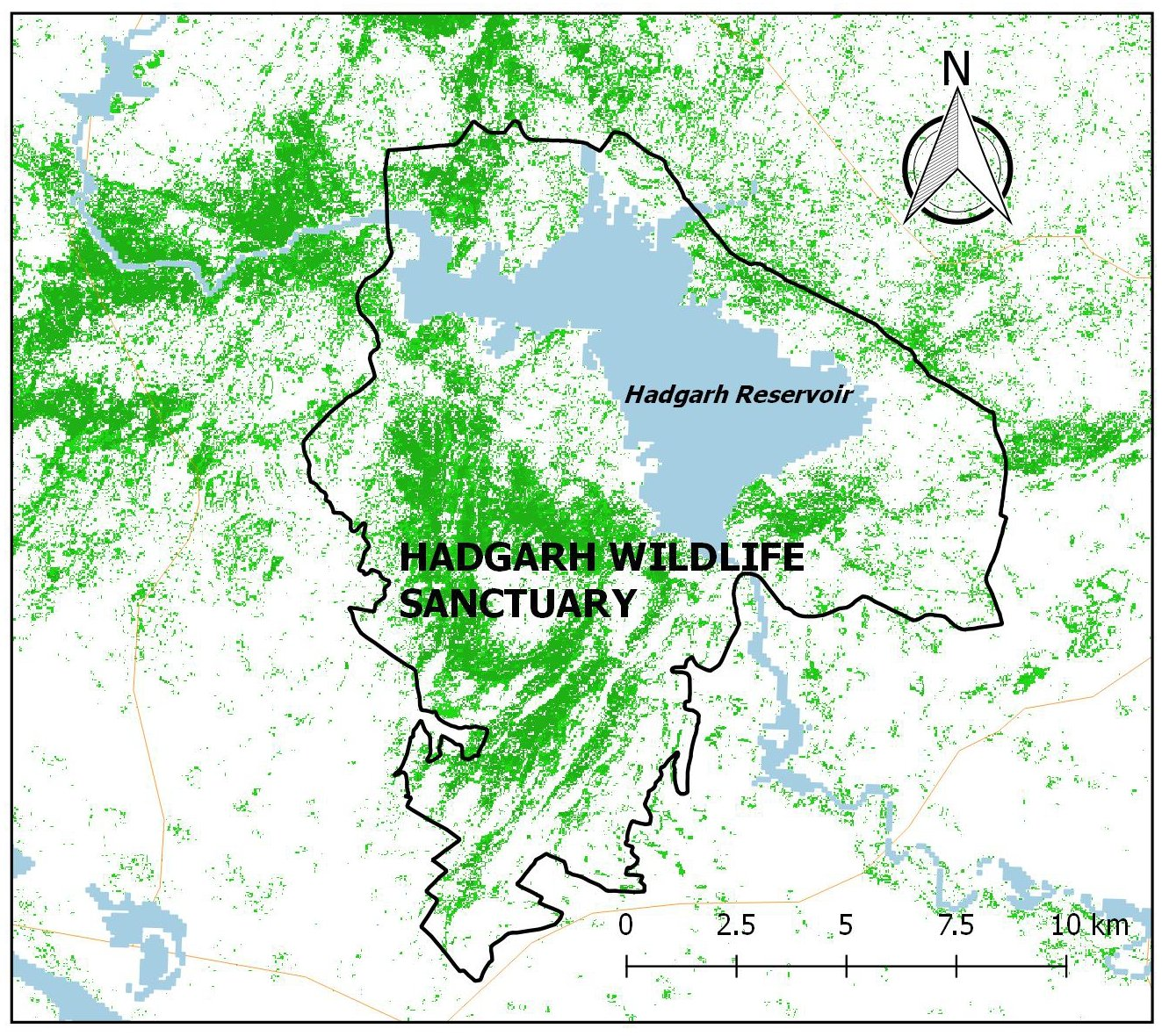
Hadgarh Wildlife Sanctuary map, green and blue colors show forest cover and waterbody, respectively.

The sanctuary comprises Boula RF in Anandapur and Satakosia R.F. (part) of Karanjia Forest Divisions. Later, its potential as an elephant reserve was recognized, and improvement work was started through Project Elephant to develop the sanctuary. Now, this sanctuary has been included in Mayurbhanj Elephant Reserve.

The sanctuary lies in the catchment of Salandi river, a major tributary of the river Baitarani. Besides the Salandi river, the other perennial and seasonal streams are Mukta stream, Ghagara stream, Pitanau stream, Andheri stream, Suranga stream, Chakratirtha stream and Bentokholi stream. A large stagnant water body (31.83 km2) of river Salandi, called Hadagarh reservoir is located inside the Sanctuary and is the important wetlands of this Sanctuary that attracts a variety of water birds both migratory and resident. Hadgarh sanctuary is linked to Similipal tiger reserve and Kuldiha wildlife sanctuary.

It is located on the Chota Nagpur Plateau in northeastern Odisha. The primary plant community is mixed deciduous forests, including Sal (Shorea robusta). It is in the Eastern Highlands moist deciduous forests ecoregion. The Salandi River here flows between two mountains, the Hadgarh Dam was not accidentally built right here, today it is the biggest tourist attraction of this area.

== Wildlife ==
This sanctuary has a wide range of fauna, such as leopard, tiger, fishing cat, jungle cat, langur, pangolin, wolf and hyena.. The sanctuary is home to 156 bird species from 56 families.
