= Budhabalanga River =

River in Odisha, India

Coordinates: 21.4695°N 87.0657°E

Budhabalanga River Balanga River
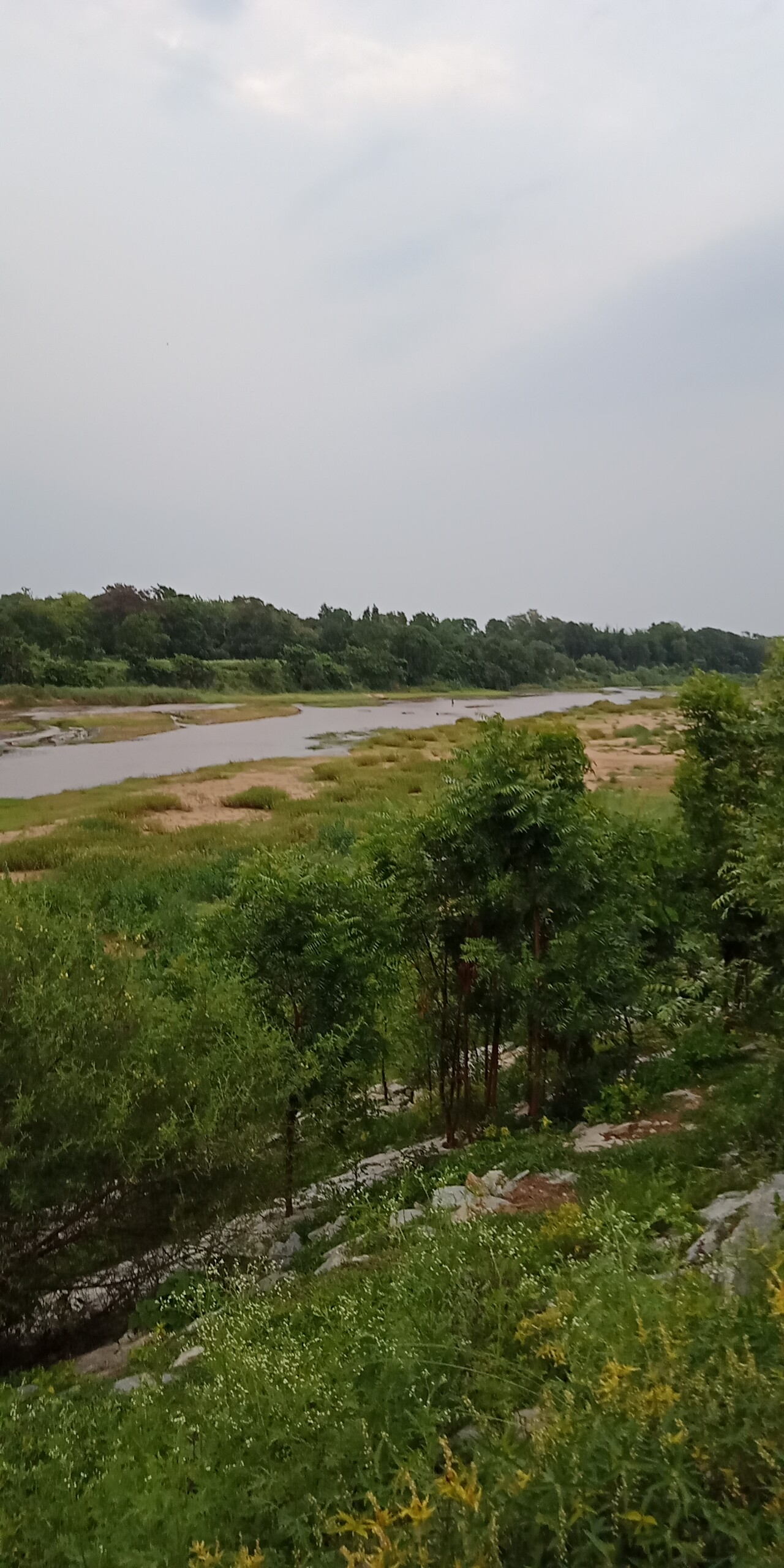
- Native name: ବୁଢାବଳଙ୍ଗ ନଦୀ (Odia)

Location
- Country: India
- State: Odisha
- District: Mayurbhanj district, Balasore district
- City: Baripada

Physical characteristics
- Source: Similipal hills
  - location: Mayurbhanj district
- Mouth: Bay of Bengal
- Length: 175 km (109 mi)

The Budhabalanga River (ବୁଢାବଳଙ୍ଗ ନଦୀ; also called Balanga River) flows through the districts of Mayurbhanj and Balasore in the Indian state of Odisha.

== Course ==
The Budhabalanga, meaning old Balanga, rises in the Similipal hills and plunges through Barehipani Falls, the second-highest waterfall in India, located in Simlipal National Park. It then flows in a northerly direction up to the village Karanjiapal in Bangriposi police-station area. Thereafter, it turns to the north-east and flows along the railway track up to the village Jhankapahadi. There the Budhabalanga changes its course to the south and accepts the Katra nala. The other tributaries of the Budhabalanga are the Palpala and the Chipat, both of which are hill streams rising also from the Similipal hills. Then the river passes through Baripada. It later flows through Balasore district and into the Bay of Bengal.

== River data ==
The Budhabalanga is about 175 kilometres (109 mi) long and has a total catchment area of 4,840 square kilometres (1,870 sq mi). Its major tributaries are the Sone, the Gangadhar, and the Katra.
