= Deomali (mountain) =

Mountain in Odisha, India

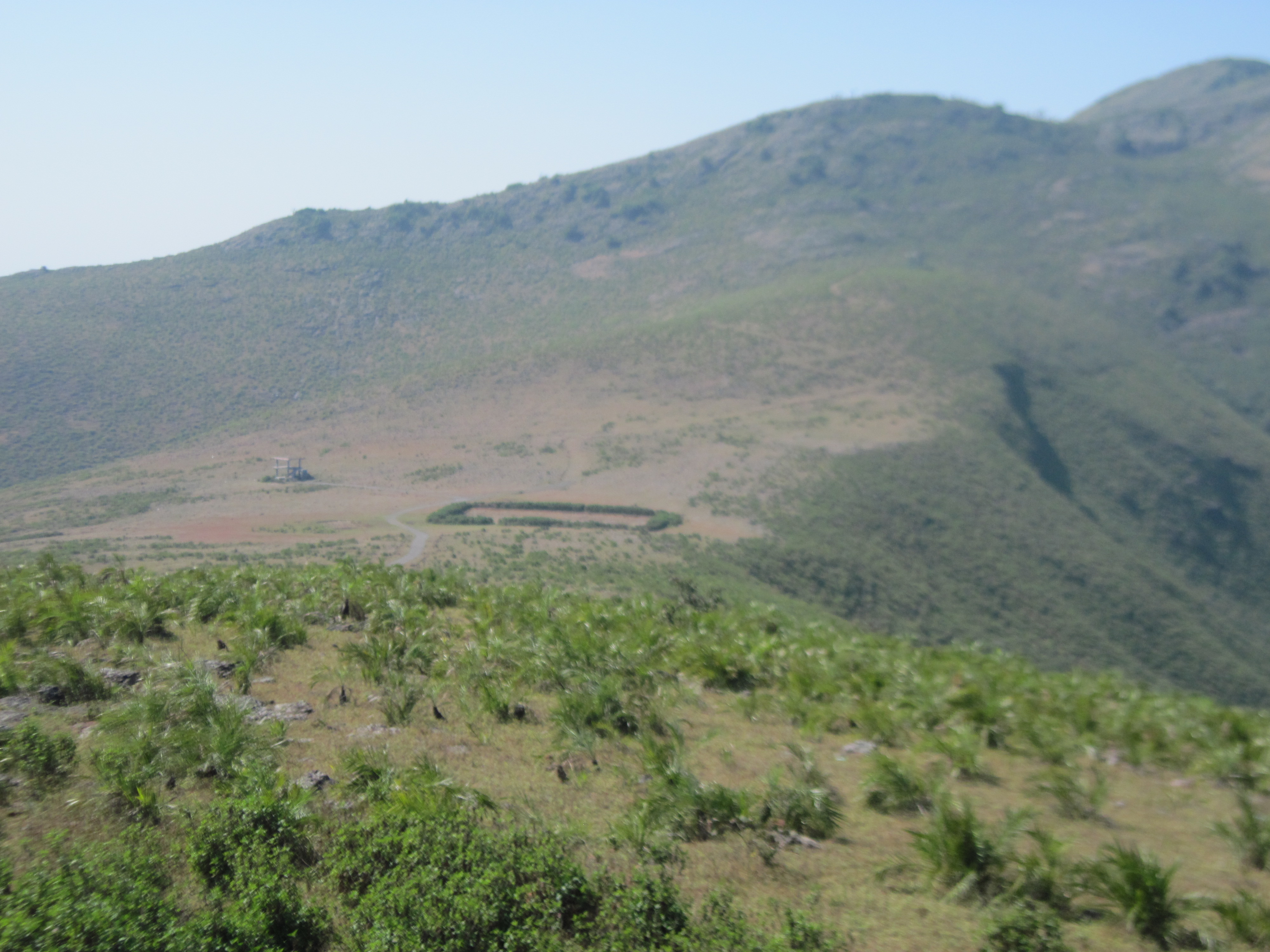

Highest point
- Elevation: 1,672 m (5,486 ft)
- Listing: List of Indian states and territories by highest point
- Coordinates: 18°40′32″N 82°58′54″E

Geography
- Location within Odisha Location within India
- Location: Koraput district, Odisha, India
- Parent range: Eastern Ghats
- Topo map: Google topographic map

Climbing
- Easiest route: Hike / scramble

Deomali is a mountain peak in the Chandragiri-Pottangi subrange of the Eastern Ghats. It is located near Koraput town in the Koraput district of Odisha, India.

== About ==
Deomali Peak, with an elevation of about 1,672 m, is the highest peak in the state of Odisha.

It is situated near Barabandha village, Kotia Panchayat division, which is about 70 km from Koraput via Semiliguda.

Surrounded by deep green forest, the peak is rich in flora and fauna. This hill range is rich in mineral resources such as bauxite, limestone and gemstones. Deomali is dotted with brooks and deep valleys, and inhabited by tribes such as the Kandhas, Parajas, Bhumia, Malis and Bhotias.

Tourist activities include hang gliding, mountaineering and trekking. The Odisha tourism Department has taken steps to popularize this peak as a hot tourist spot by connecting the tar roads, hill top amenities centre, drinking water points on the hill top, and watching towers for good views of the arena. Many waterfalls are also found here.

The Putsil Valley, which is part of the Deomali Mountain Range, is nearby.

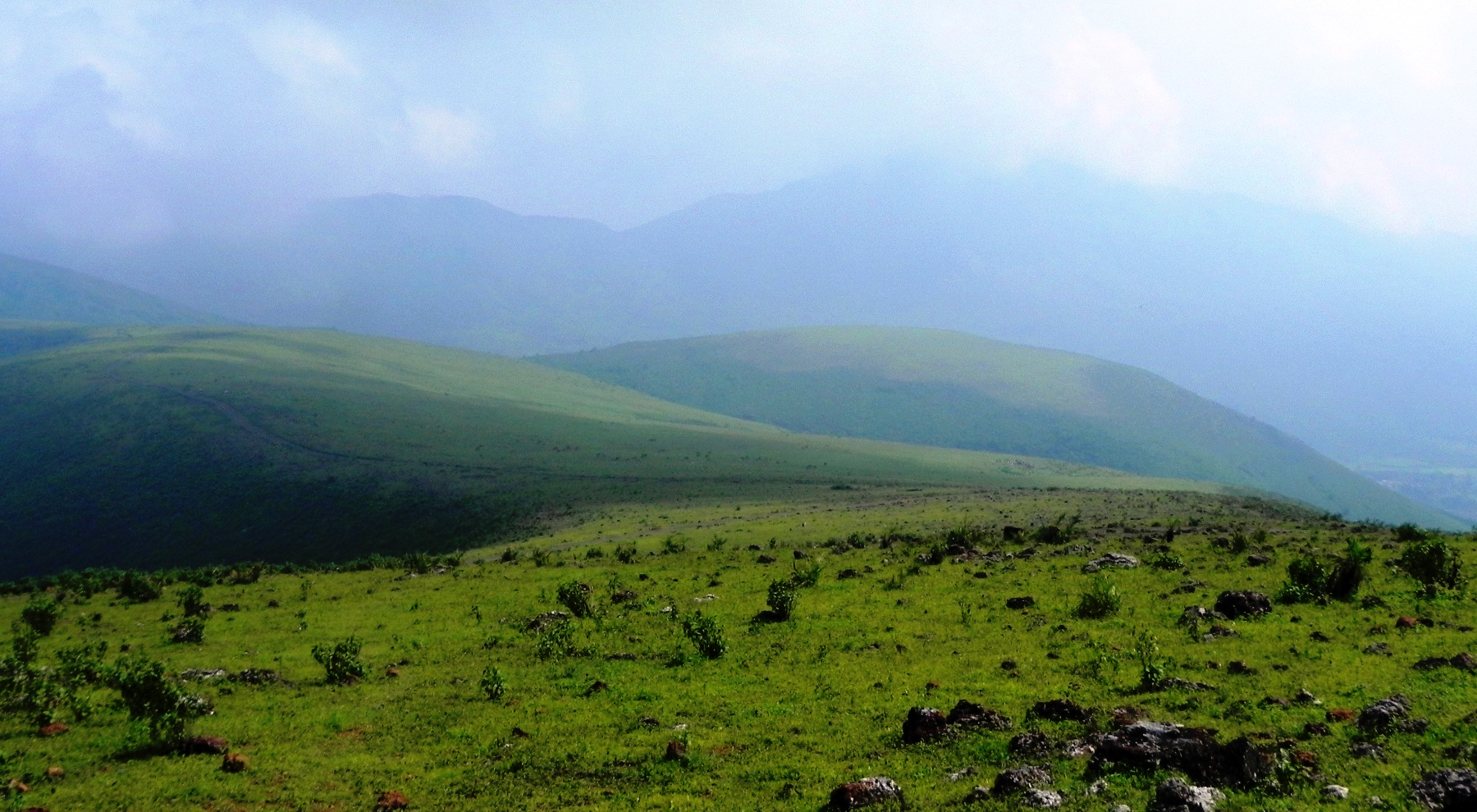
Deomali Peak

== See also ==
- Geography of Odisha
- List of mountains in India
- List of mountains by elevation
