= Jashipur =

- Town
- Location in Odisha, India
- Coordinates: 21.9675°N 86.0803°E
- Country: India
- State: Odisha
- District: Mayurbhanj
- Elevation: 406 m (1,332 ft)

Population (2001)
  - Total: 14,195

Languages
  - Official: Odia
- Time zone: UTC+5:30 (IST)
- PIN: 757034
- Telephone code: 06797-xxxxxx
- Vehicle registration: OD11-X-XXXX
- Website: https://mayurbhanj.nic.in/

Jashipur is a town in Mayurbhanj district in the state of Odisha, India. The town is located in southwestern region of Simlipal National Park comprising diverse geographical valleys, forest lands and scores of ancient temples like Khiching temple and first headquarter of erstwhile Mayurbhanj state.

== Geography ==
Jashipur is located at 21.9675°N 86.0803°E. It has an average elevation of 406 metres (1332 feet). Two National Highways pass through it - NH 49 and NH 220.; Kolkata Mumbai NH and Ranchi Vijayawada NH respectively.TataNagar is 2.5 hrs away from Jashipur. Nearest Railway station is Badampahar which is 17.5 km from Jashipur and another nearby Railway Station is Bangiriposi which is 61 km from Jashipur.

== Demographics ==
As of 2001, Jashipur had a population of 14,876. Males constitute 53% of the population and females 47%. Jashipur has an average literacy rate of 74%, higher than the national average of 59.5%: male literacy is 80%, and female literacy is 67%. In Jashipur, 11% of the population is under 6 years of age. Now the local population is more than 25,000. A majority of the population belong to the ST community. Other spoken languages are Hindi and Bengali due to Jashipur's proximity to West Bengal and Jharkhand.Rest population are S.C., Christians, Sikhs, Muslims and Higher Caste Hindu.

== Education ==
Colleges in Jashipur include:

- Jashipur Junior College

Schools in Jashipur include:

- Jashipur Primary School
- Jashipur Govt High School
- Govt Girls High School
- De Paul School
- DAV Public School
- Odisha Adarsha Vidyalaya (CBSE)
- Saraswati Sishu Vidya Mandir.

Jashipur Girls High School was privately founded in 1965 by local Muslim Business men namely late Mazhar Imam Khan / PWD Contractor & late Hasim khan of Jashipur Town. But in 1980, it was taken over by the Odisha government.

== Tourism ==
More than 5 waterfalls are located near Jashipur. Simlipal National Park is a national park and tiger reserve situated only 50 km. from Jashipur. Jashipur is also famous for Crocodile Park.-which is located around 3 km away from the Main market of Jashipur and on the River Khairi Bhandan. Locally this place is known as Rama Tirtha. In the whole India, this is the only Crocodile Nursery Park under Odisha Forest.

== Transportation ==
- Regarding road transport, luxury A/C buses are a popular means of transportation between the cities. There is connectivity to Bhubaneswar, Puri, Sambalpur, Jharsuguda, Rourkela, Keonjhar, Balasore, Angul, Cuttack, Jamshedpur, Ranchi and Kolkata from here. There are a wide range of taxis for sightseeing and tours.
- The nearest railway station is badampahar railway station which is 17 km from jashipur.
