= Badaghagara Waterfall =

- ବଡ଼ଘାଗରା ଜଳପ୍ରପାତ
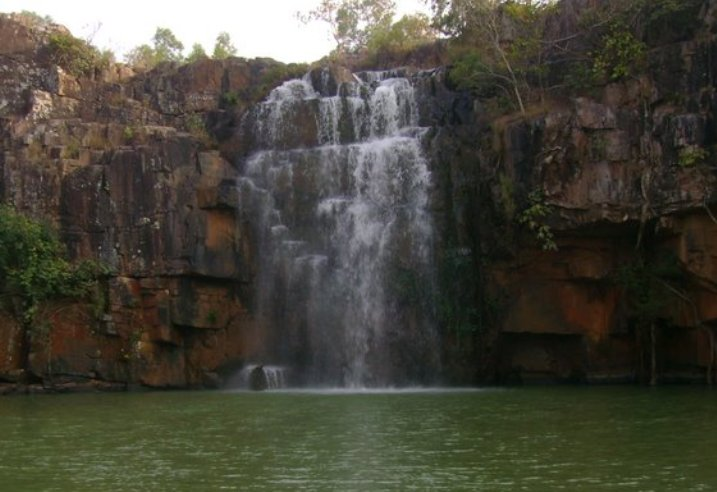
- Badaghagara Waterfall, Kendujhar

- Location within Odisha
- Location: Kendujhar district, Odisha, India
- Coordinates: 21.6089°N 85.5557°E
- Total height: 60 metres (200 ft)
- Number of drops: 1
- Watercourse: Machha Kandana

The Badaghagara Waterfall is a waterfall of the Kendujhar district in the Indian state of Odisha.

== Location ==
Badaghagara is located at a distance of 9 km from the district headquarters (Kendujhar) of Kendujhar district. Being a perennial source of water, a dam has constructed on the downstream side. It is situated 3 kilometers downstream of Sanaghagara Waterfall.

== The falls ==
It is a perennial waterfall. MAHANADI, plunges from a height of 60 metres (200 ft) in a single drop.

== See also ==
- List of waterfalls in India
- List of waterfalls in India by height
