= Joranda Falls =

Waterfall in India

Coordinates: 21°56′14″N 86°24′15″E

- ଯୋରନ୍ଦା ପ୍ରପାତ
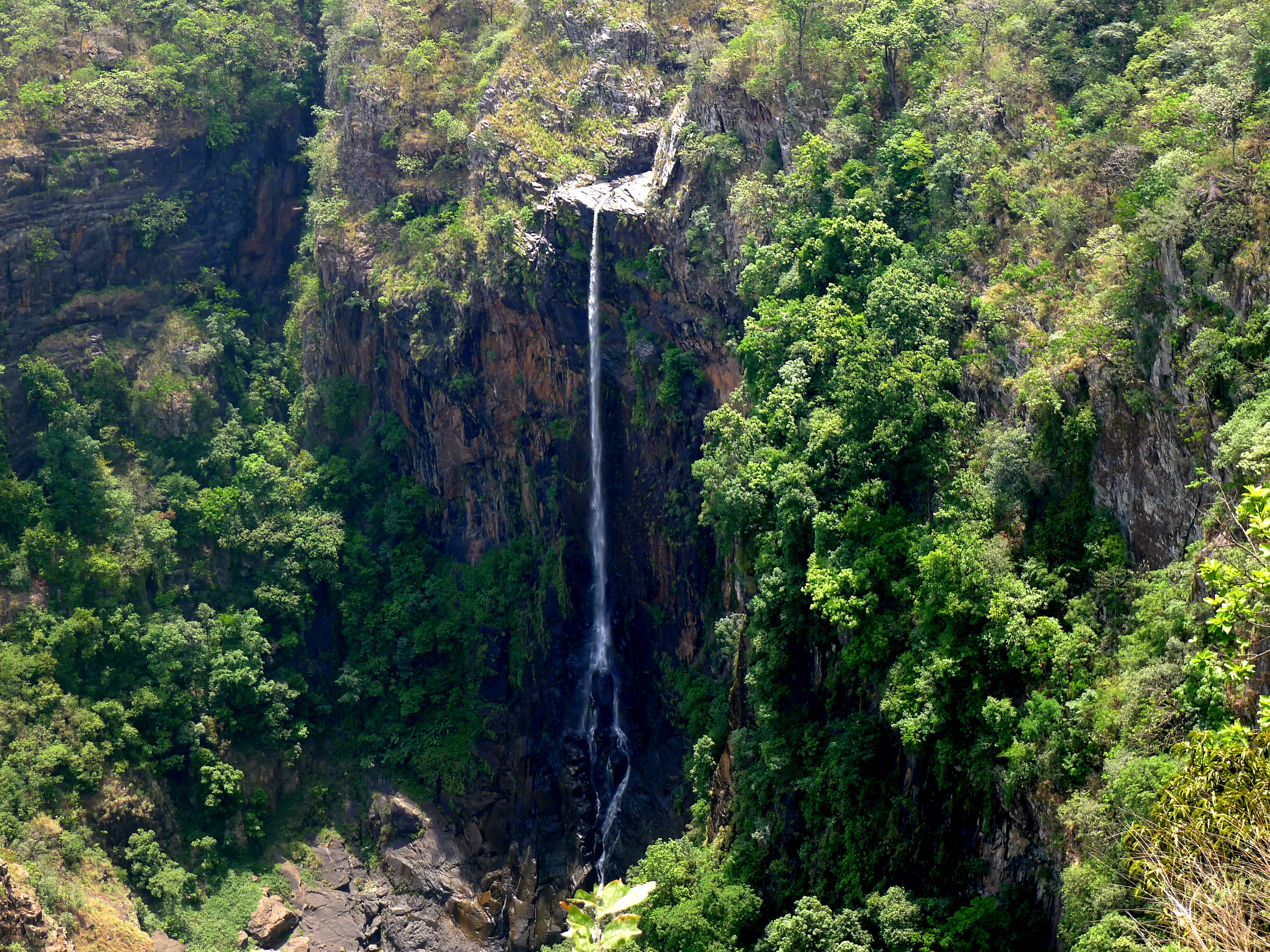

- Location within Odisha
- Location: Mayurbhanj district, Odisha, India
- Type: Plunge
- Total height: 150 metres (490 ft)
- Number of drops: 1

The Joranda Falls (Odia: ଯୋରନ୍ଦା ପ୍ରପାତ) is a waterfall located in the core area of Simlipal National Park in Mayurbhanj district in the Indian state of Odisha. The Barehipani Falls (India's second highest waterfall) is located close to the Joranda Falls. Joranda is the 21st highest waterfall in India.

== The falls ==
The Joranda Falls has a total height of 150 metres (490 ft). The water plunges over a lofty cliff in a single drop, spreading out slightly as it falls.

== See also ==
- List of waterfalls
- List of waterfalls in India
- List of waterfalls in India by height
