= Kanjia Lake =

- Location within India
- Location: India
- Coordinates: 20.401332°N 85.819734°E
- Type: lake

Kanjia Lake (Odia: କାଞ୍ଜିଆ ହ୍ରଦ) is a natural lake on the northern outskirts of Bhubaneswar, Odisha, India. While the main lake covers 75 hectares (190 acres), the total wetland covers 105 hectares (260 acres), with a scuba diving facility. It has rich biodiversity and is a wetland of national importance, which helps maintain the city's ecology.

The lake's ecosystem is hosts to 37 species of birds, 20 species of reptiles, 10 species of amphibians, 46 species of fish and three species of prawns, 10 species of sub-merged macrophytes, 14 species of floating macrophytes and 24 species of emergent macrophytes.

The lake is facing threat from uncontrolled quarrying, the dumping of solid waste and haphazard real estate construction on its fringe areas.

The lake is a part of the Nandankanan Zoological Park and is used for recreational boating by visitors.
