= Sanaghagara Waterfall =

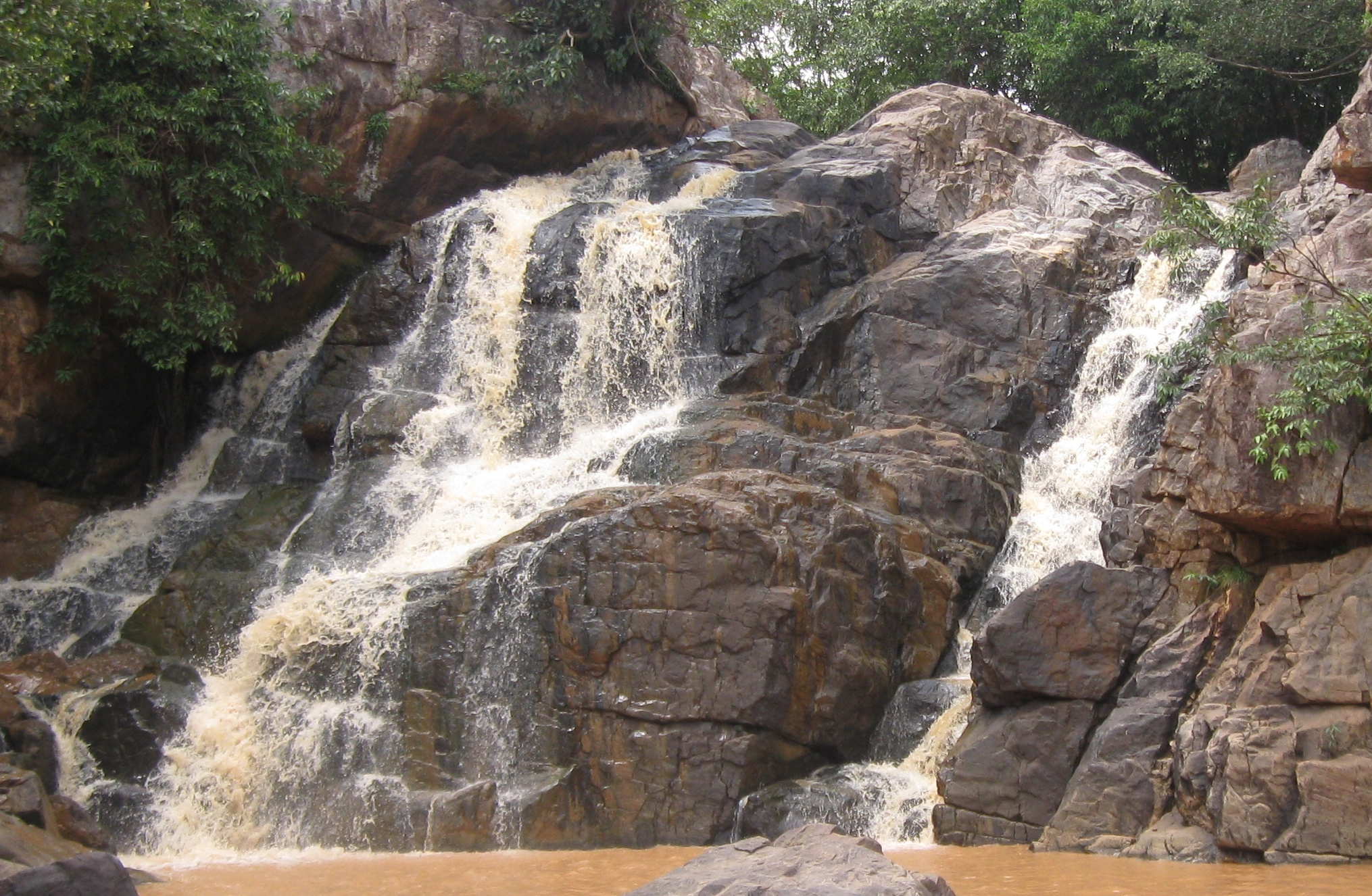
- Sanaghagara Waterfall, Kendujhar

- Location within Odisha
- Location: Kendujhar district, Odisha, India
- Coordinates: 21.632792°N 85.556880°E
- Total height: 30.5 metres (100 ft)
- Number of drops: 2
- Watercourse: Machha Kandana

The Sanaghagara Waterfall is a waterfall located in the Kendujhar district in the Indian state of Odisha. It is located 3 kilometers upstream of Badaghagara Waterfall, also in Kendujhar.

== See also ==
- List of waterfalls
- List of waterfalls in India
- List of waterfalls in India by height
