= Khandadhar Falls, Kendujhar =

Khandadhar Fall
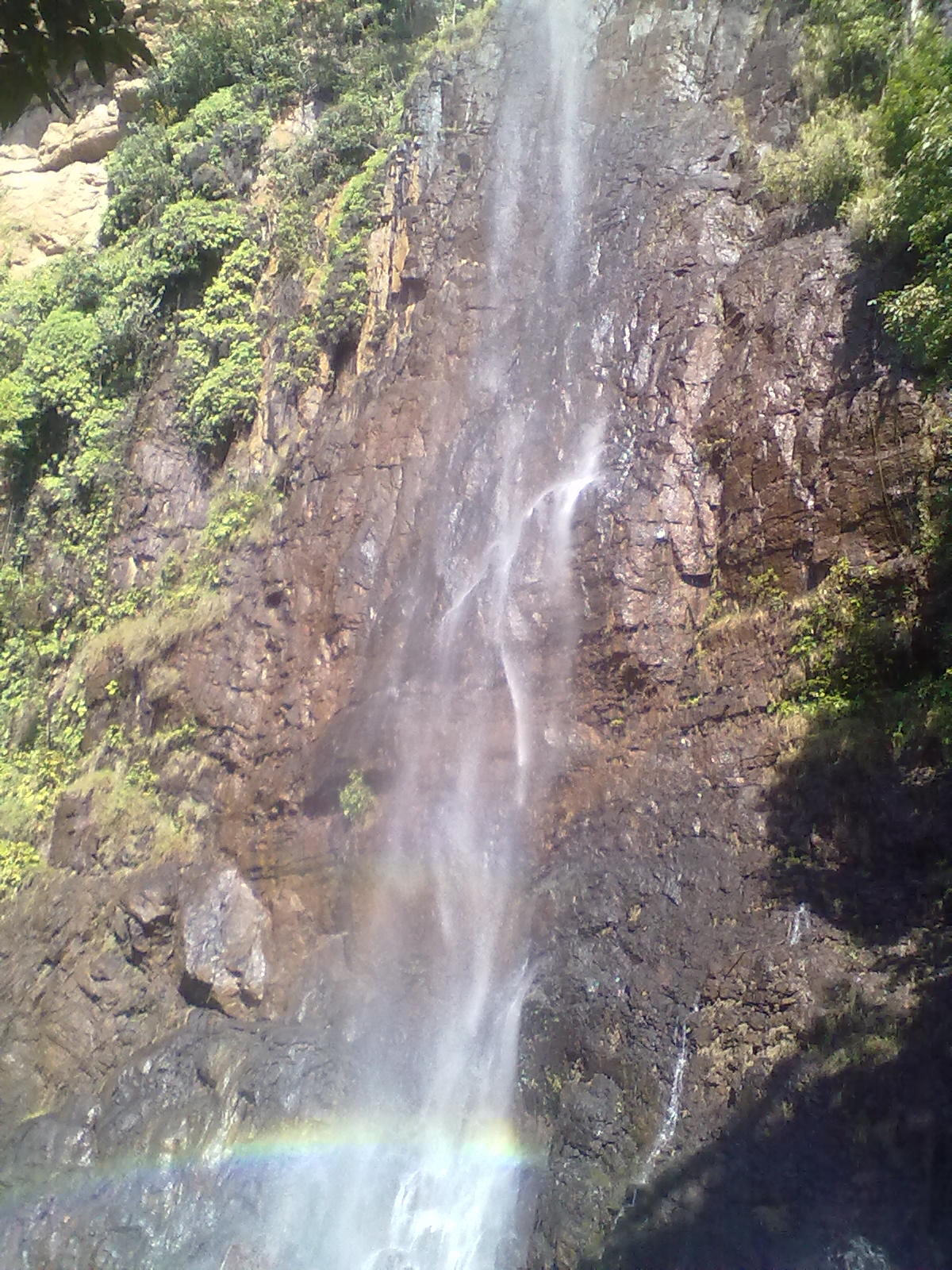
- Khandadhar Waterfall

- Location within Odisha
- Location: Keonjhar district, Odisha, India
- Coordinates: 21.774559°N 85.322121°E
- Type: Slide
- Total height: 500 ft (152 m)

Khandadhar Falls is located in Kendujhar district in the Indian state of Odisha.

It is a 500 ft (152 m) high waterfall in the midst of a dense forest. It has a "smoke like" appearance created by the spraying of water as it cascades down the rock face.

== Location ==
Video of the Khandadhar Falls.

Kahandhar is 54 km away from Keonjhar town of Odisha.

Khandadhar Fall is located in Khandadhar Hill, one of the hills partially in Keonjhar district. On the opposite side of the hill is another waterfall with the same name. Khandadhar Falls, Sundagarh which is located in Banei subdivision of Sundagarh district.

== See also ==
- List of waterfalls
- List of waterfalls in India
