= Badampahar =

Town in Odisha, India

Badampahar, also known as Dhangdimuta, is a census town in Badampahad police station of Mayurbhanj district of Odisha, India. As per 2011 census, Badampahar had a population of 3,507 with 1,606 being males and 1,901 being females. Badampahar has a children population of 456. Badampahar literacy is 68.96%. There are 831 Households. Number of workers is 1,163. Out of these, 787 are male workers and 376 are female workers. Badampahar area is 3.63 square kilometres (1.40 sq mi).
