= Phurlijharan =

- ଫୁରଲିଝରଣ
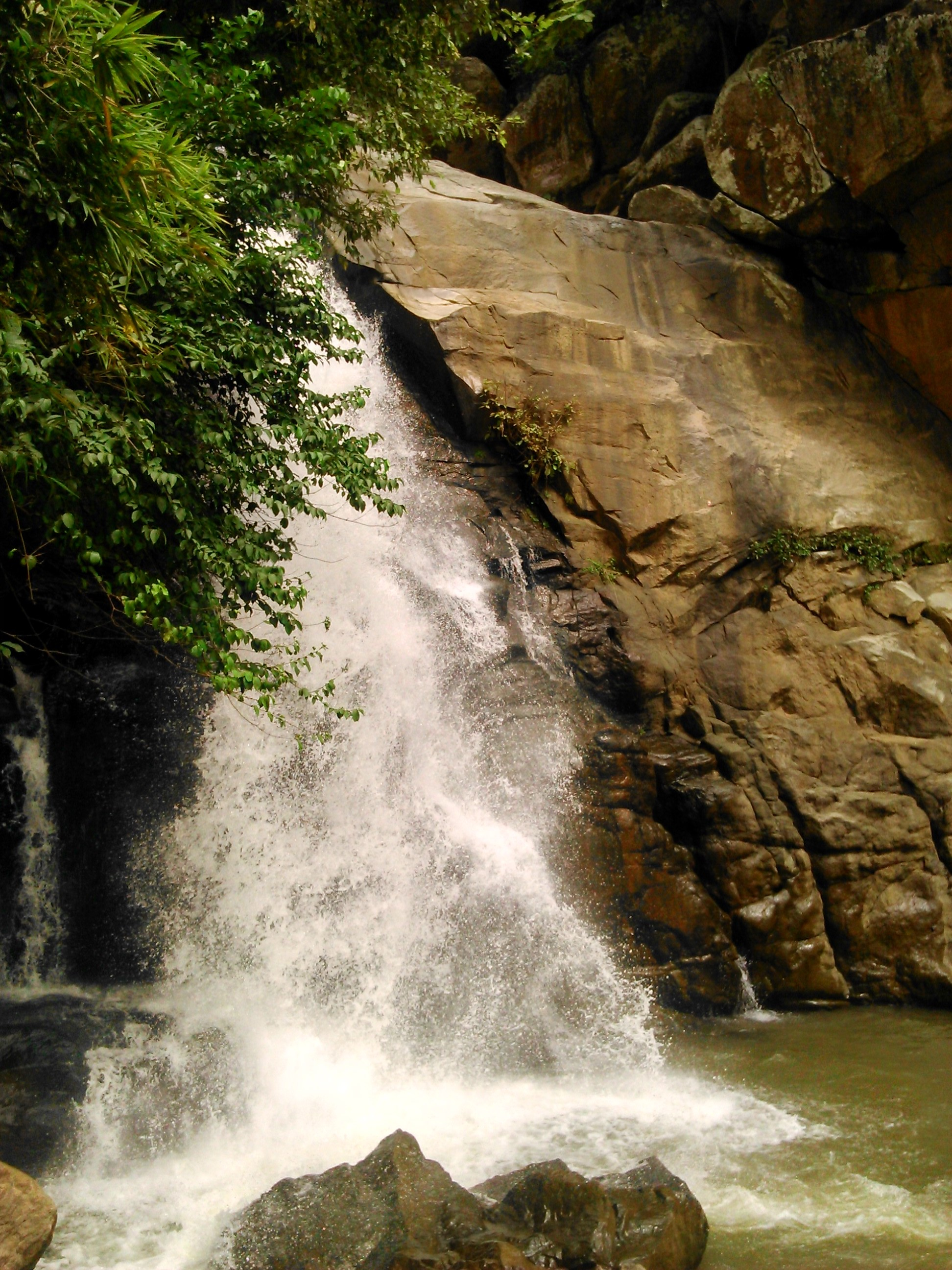
- Phurlijharan waterfall
- Interactive map of Phurlijharan
- Location: Bhawanipatna, Kalahandi, Odisha, India
- Coordinates: 19.7815046°N 83.1110626°E
- Type: Waterfall
- Total height: 15 m (49 ft) (at center)
- Number of drops: 1
- Watercourse: Sagada river

Phurlijharan (/pʰurɵlid͡ʒʱɵrɵɳɵ/) is a perennial waterfall in Bhawanipatna, Kalahandi district, Odisha, India. The falls on the Sagada river are 16 m high and known for the colored rainbows that the reflections of sunlight create here. It is a tourist attraction that is close to the Karlapat Wildlife Sanctuary.

== Tourism ==
Phurlijharan is 15 kilometres (9.3 mi) from Bhawanipatna on state highway 44. Odisha State Road Transport Corporation and private buses connect it with Bhawanipatna and other nearby cities.

== Gallery ==
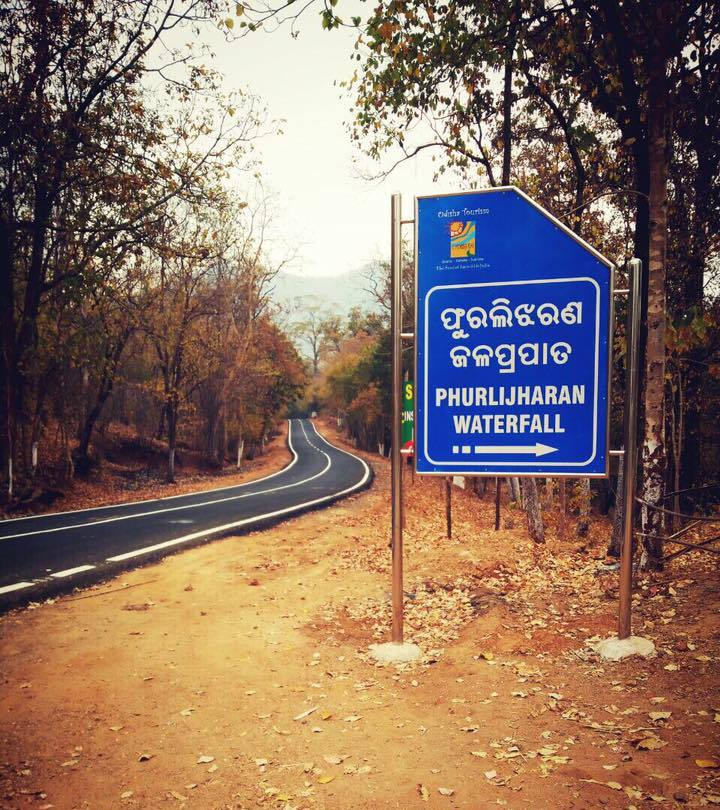
Entrance to the waterfall

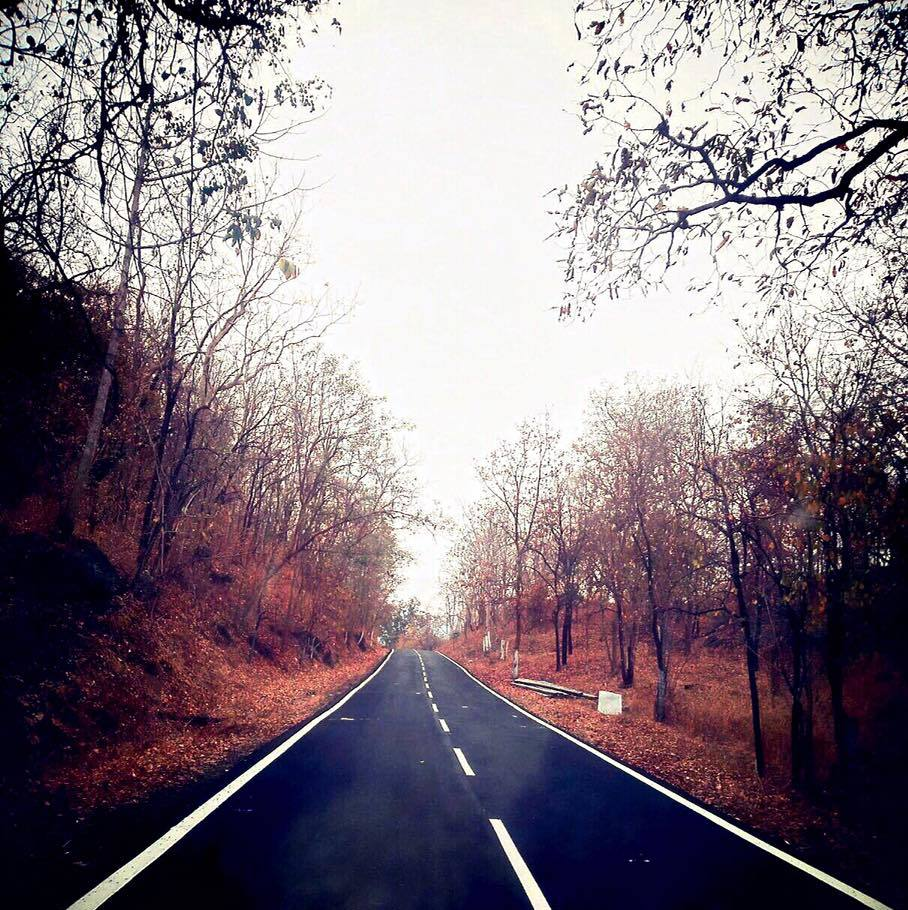
Road to Phurlijharan

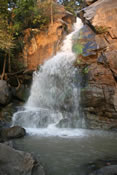

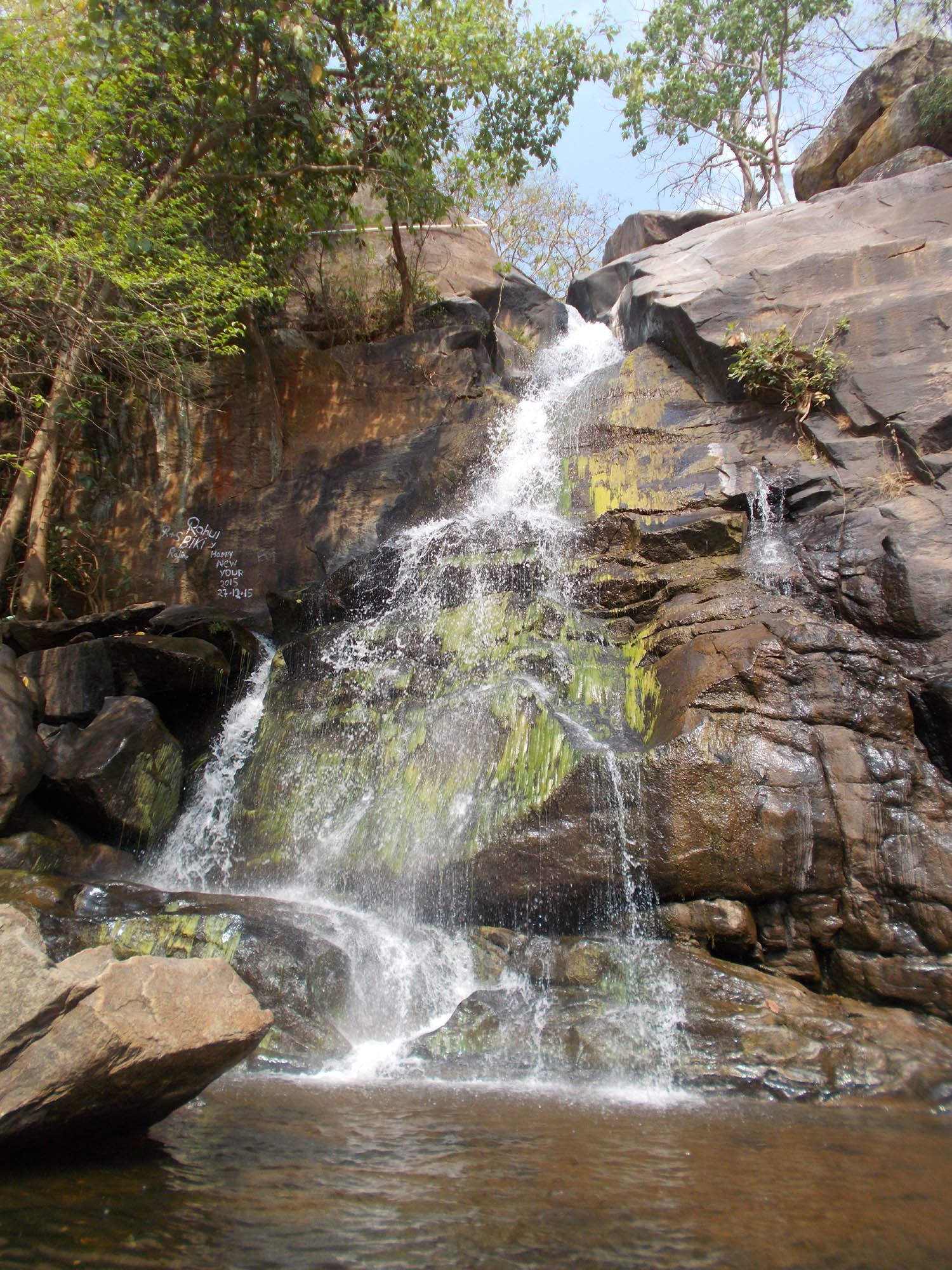

== See also ==
- List of waterfalls
- List of waterfalls in India
- Bhawanipatna
- Geography of Odisha
