= Khandadhar Falls (Sundargarh) =

Khandadhar Falls ଖଣ୍ଡାଧାର ଜଳପ୍ରପାତ
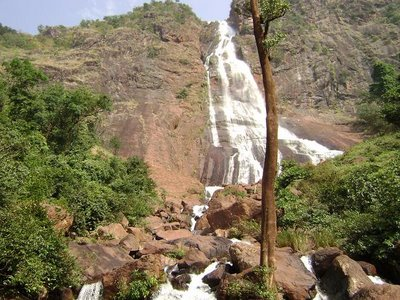

- Location within Odisha
- Location: Bonaigarh, Sundargarh, Odisha, India
- Coordinates: 21°45′41″N 85°07′02″E
- Type: horse tail
- Total height: 244 metres (801 ft)
- Number of drops: 1
- Watercourse: Kora Nala

The Khandadhar Falls is located in Nandapani, Bonaigarh in the Sundargarh district on the Indian state of Odisha. It is the 9th highest waterfall in India and the second highest in Odisha after Barehipani Falls in Mayurbhanj.

== Location ==
The Khandadhar Falls is 104 kilometres (65 mi) from Rourkela via Bonaigarh, and 132 kilometres (82 mi) from Kendujhar.

== The falls ==
It looks like a sword that's why it is named the khanda(sword) dhara waterfall. The Korapani Nala, a small stream, plunges from a height of 244 metres (801 ft) in a single drop.

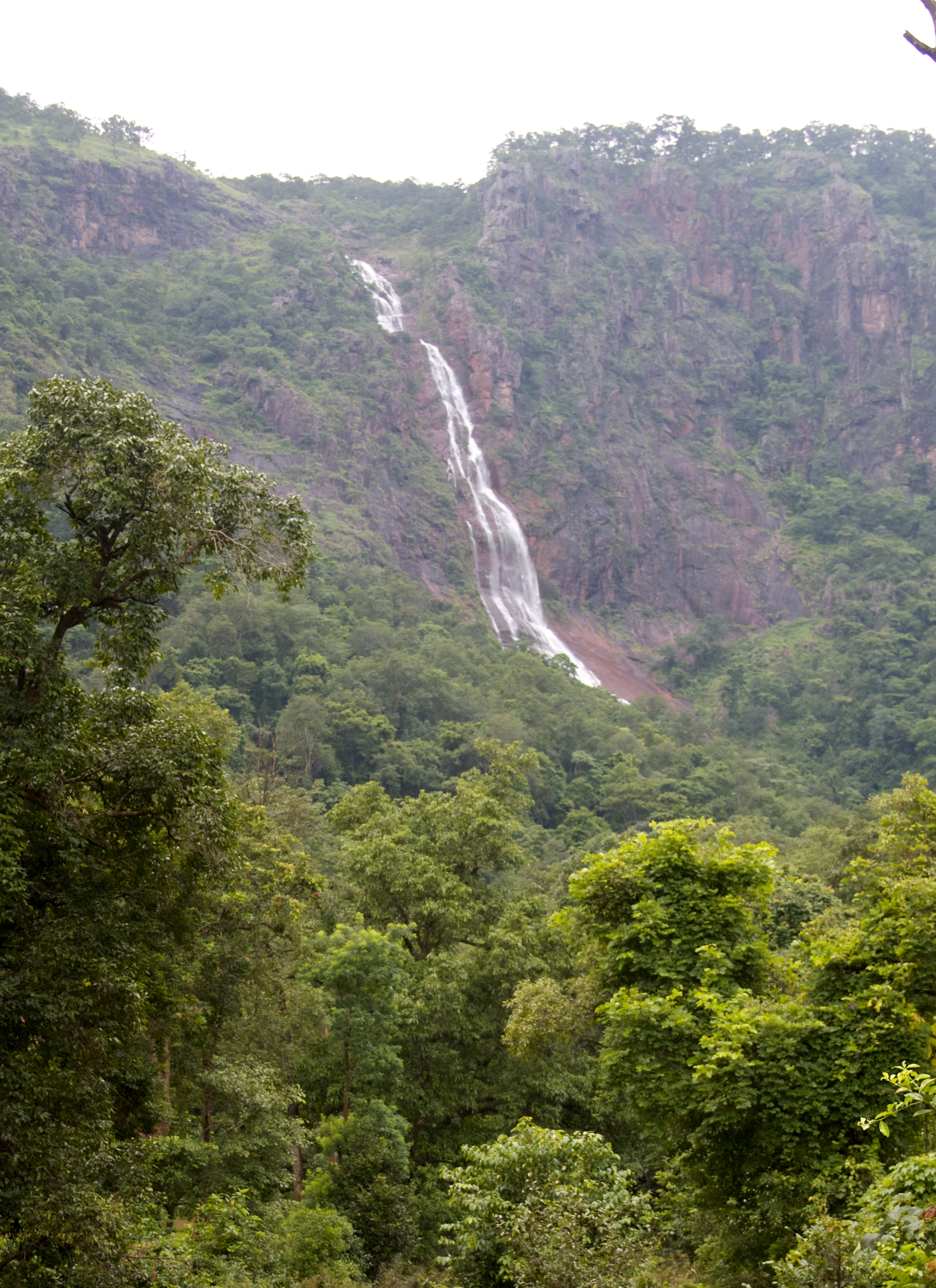
Khandhadhar Falls around 90 km From Rourkela is second highest fall of Orissa and 12th in India with plunging height of 801 Feet .

== Legend ==
There is an interesting legend among the Pauri Bhuiya tribals who inhabit the area around Khandadhar. The legend is reproduced from Outlook (magazine):

“A Pauri Bhuiya legend speaks of how their mountains came to be so munificent. The Sundergarh branch of the community was once possessed by a rapacious goddess named Kankala Devi, who consumed trees, soil and everything else. In despair, the Pauri Bhuiya placed her on a rock, which she ate through as well—creating a deep hole from which poured out the Khandadhara (split-rock waterfall). So they had water. Then a couple from the community went to visit relatives at the eastern, or Keonjhar, end of the Khandadhar mountain range. Their prospective hosts were away but a pile of grains had been left outdoors and, amazingly, not even the birds were eating it. Inside the heap, the couple discovered a small goddess, Kanta Kumari, protector of the region’s prosperity. They stole her and brought her back to Sundergarh, and so her bounty became theirs.”

== Impact of mining ==
The Kalinga Commercial Corporation Limited operates the Kurmitar mine on the Khandadhar hill range spread over 133 hectares. It exports iron ore to China and manganese ore to Korea. The diversion of a mountaintop stream has resulted in the partial drying up of Khandadhara Falls. The state owned Odisha Mineral Corporation has mines in the area spread over 1,212 hectares, with agreement signed with Adhunik Metaliks and Rexon Strips for the supply of iron ore. The Odisha government intends to lease out 2,500 hectares to POSCO India, which has led to local protests, and the matter has gone to court. As of 2012, a court judgement is awaited.

== See also ==
- List of waterfalls
- List of waterfalls in India
- List of waterfalls in India by height
