= Barehipani Falls =

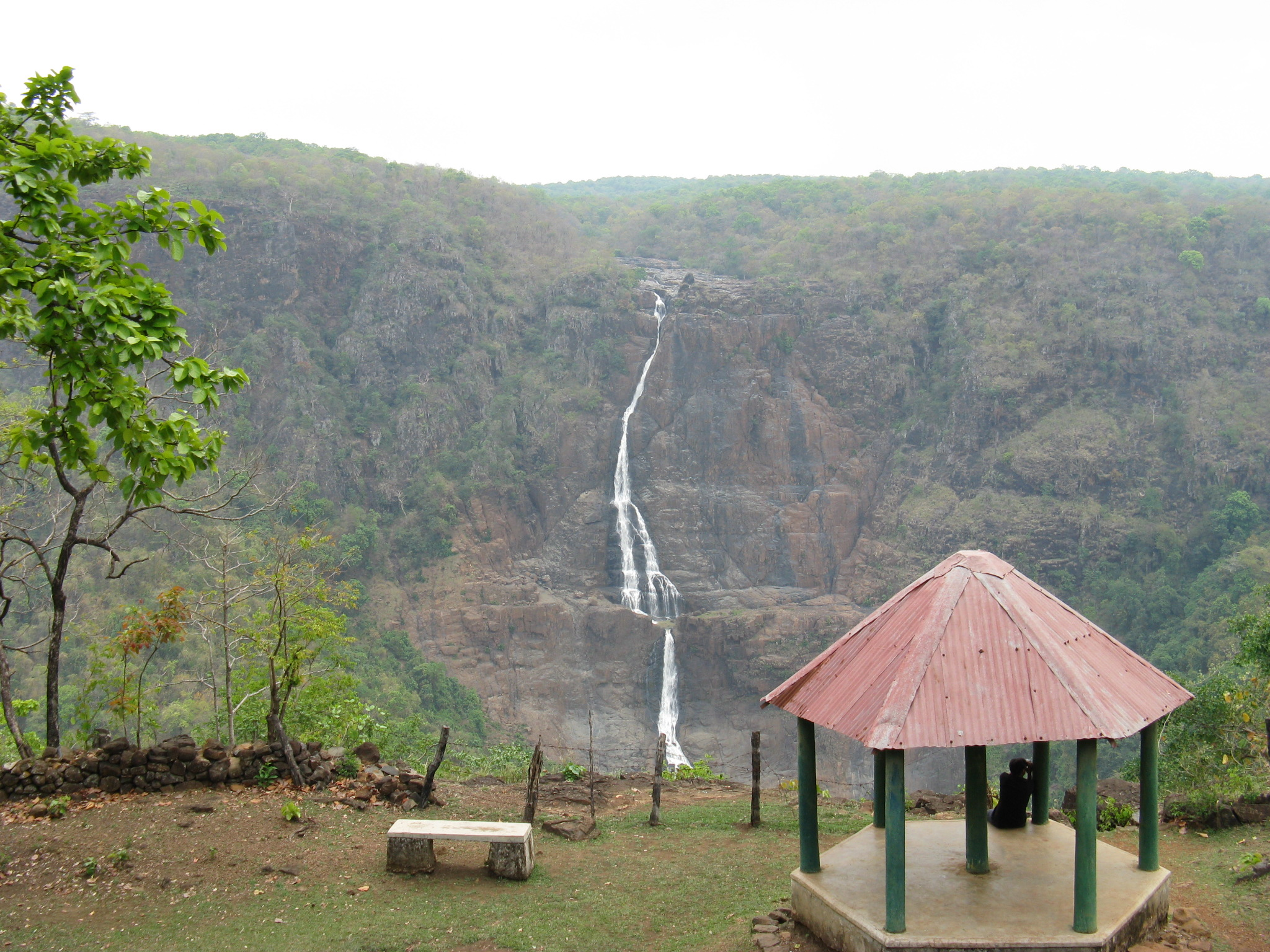
- Barehipani Falls

- Location within Odisha
- Location: Mayurbhanj district, Odisha, India, Asia
- Coordinates: 21°56′01″N 86°22′49″E
- Type: Tiered
- Total height: 399 metres (1,309 ft)
- Number of drops: 2
- Watercourse: Budhabalanga River

Barehipani Falls is a two-tiered waterfall located in Simlipal National Park in Mayurbhanj district in the Indian state of Odisha. It is the second highest waterfalls in India.

== Location ==
The waterfall is situated at 21.932759N 86.380145E on the Budhabalanga River flowing over Meghasuni mountain of the Eastern Ghats. The nearest railway station is at Baripada. The Joranda Falls is located nearby. It is 45 km from the town of Jashipur.

== The falls ==
The Barehipani Falls has a total height of 399 metres (1,309 ft), according to different estimates. It is a tiered waterfall with two drops. it is the second highest waterfall in India and the highest in Odisha. The tallest single drop is 259 metres (850 ft).

== See also ==
- List of waterfalls
- List of waterfalls in India
- List of waterfalls in India by height
