= Evangelical Missionary Society of Mayurbhanj =

The Evangelical Missionary Society of Mayurbhanj (EMSM) was established in 1895 at the instance of Sriram Chandra Bhanj Deo, the then-Maharaja of Mayurbhanj State. It was founded by Kate Allenby.

It is a registered non-governmental organisation (NGO) in India. The society is also registered in Australia, and has run the Mayurbhanj Leprosy Home since 1982. Graham Staines, an Australian missionary, formalized the organization of the Leprosy Home. He was murdered in 1999 while he led EMMS.
