= Basanta Kumar Satpathy =

Indian writer and academic (1913–1994)

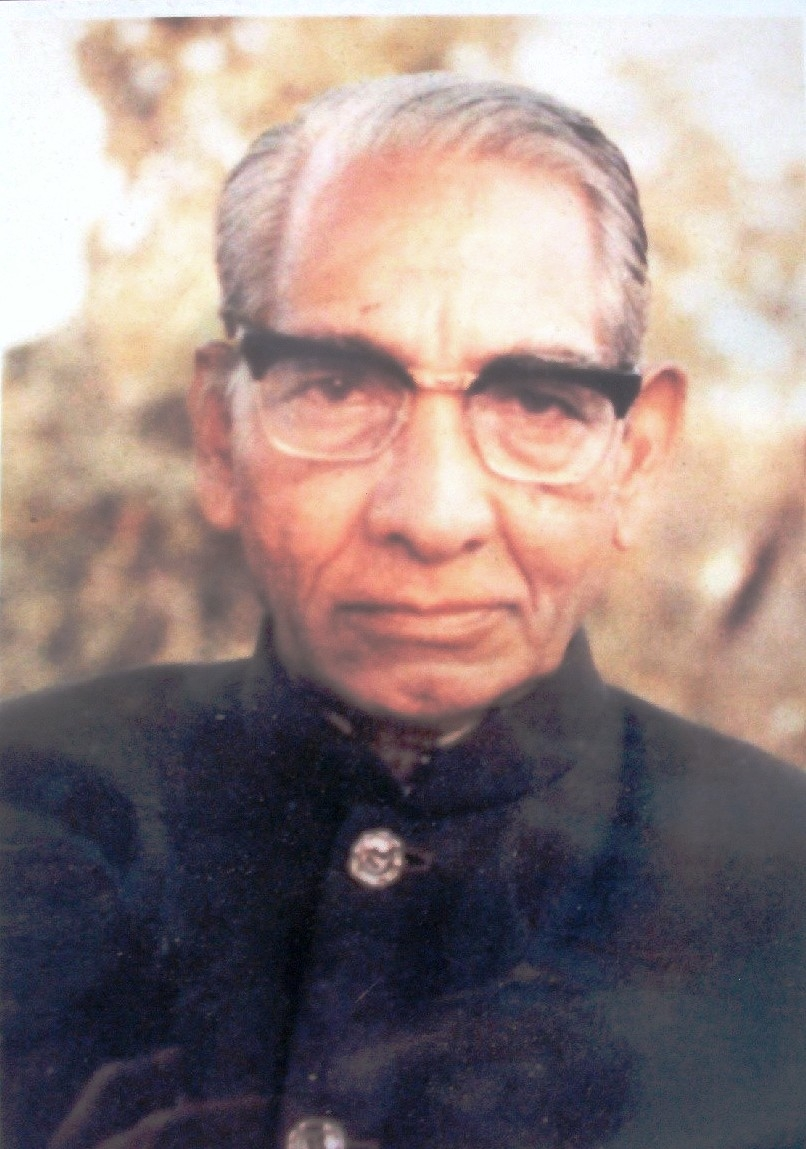
- Basanta Kumar Satpathy
- Born: 26 June 1913
- Died: 20 February 1994 (aged 80)
- Occupations: Short story writer, Essayist, Translator, Academic
- Writing career
- Notable works: Anti-romantic, Sanchayan, Manepade
- Notable awards: Odisha Sahitya Academy Award, Jhankar Award
- Website: www.basantasatpathy.in

Basanta Kumar Satpathy (26 June 1913 – 20 February 1994) was an Odia short story writer, translator, and academic. He authored twelve collections of short stories, numerous translated works, and an autobiography. He was among the few literary figures who helped chart a new direction for modern Odia literature in the post-independence period. His short fiction and essays appeared in periodicals including Indian Literature, Jhankara, Samabesha, and Asantakali. His writing has been translated into multiple Indian languages. A selection of his short stories was translated into English by Bikram Keshari Das. His works have been published by India's National Academy of Letters Sahitya Akademi, National Book Trust, and Bharatiya Jnanpith. Several of his stories have been incorporated into school and college curricula by the Government of Odisha. In 2013, his birth centenary was marked by events jointly conducted by the Sahitya Akademi and the Odisha Sahitya Academy. Satpathy received various literary awards, including the Odisha Sahitya Akademi Award (1968) for the book Anti-romantic, the Jhankar Award (1979), the Sarala Samman, and the Utkal Sahitya Samaj Samman. A monograph on his life and work was published by the Sahitya Akademi as a part of its series titled Makers of Indian Literature.

== Early life and education ==
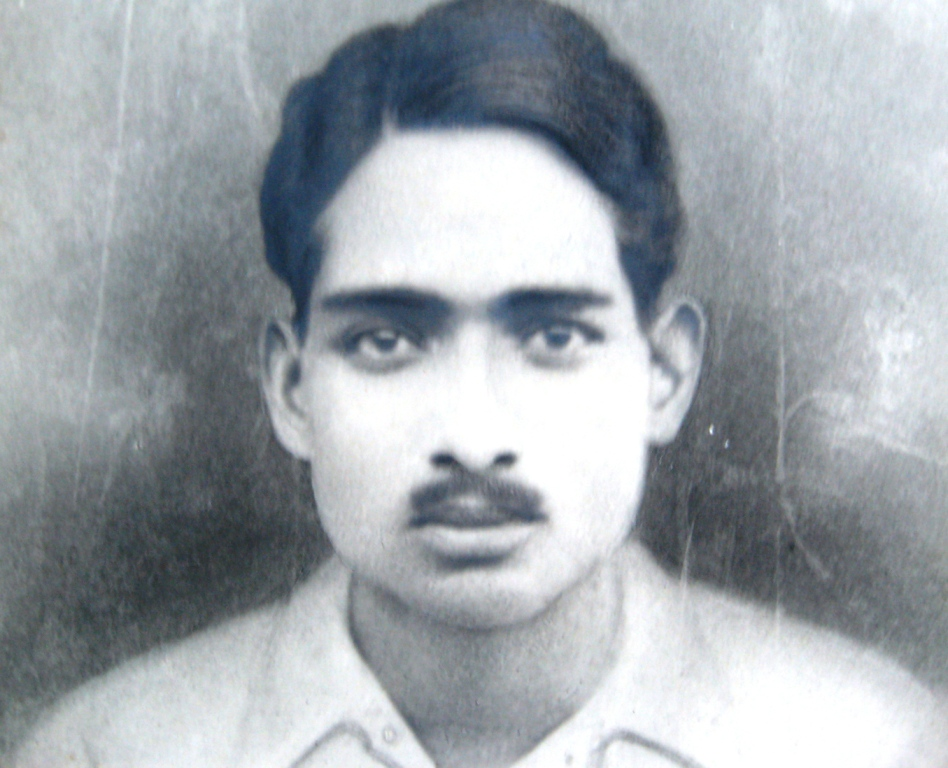
Satpathy in his college days.

Satpathy was born in Pandhada village in Mayurbhanj district, Odisha (Mayurbhanj state in British India). He received his early education in Pandhada and Shirsa, and completed his matriculation from Baripada High School. As a meritorious student, he was awarded a scholarship by the Maharaja of Mayurbhanj and pursued higher education at Ravenshaw College, Cuttack. During his student years, he came into contact with Mahatma Gandhi during the Harijan Padyatra and participated in political gatherings addressed by Jawaharlal Nehru. He also had the opportunity to engage in discussions on Odia script reform with Vinoba Bhave. Satpathy completed his M.A. in English in 1938 and began his career as a teacher at Baripada High School. He later served as Public Relations Officer to the Maharaja of Mayurbhanj and was associated with publications such as Bhanjapradip, Prajasabha, Mayurbhanj Gazette, and Mayurbhanj Chronicle. He participated in a delegation to Delhi to meet Sardar Vallabhbhai Patel regarding the merger of Mayurbhanj with the Indian Union. Following the integration of Mayurbhanj, he was transferred to the Odisha Secretariat in Cuttack as Public Relations Officer. After qualifying in the Odisha Administrative Service, he joined Samanta Chandrasekhar College, Puri. He later taught at Krushnachandra Gajapati College, Paralakhemundi, and Fakir Mohan College, Balasore.

== Writings ==
Satpathy began his literary career with a focus on literary criticism and editorial work. in Bhanja Sahitya and Mayurbhanj Chronicle. His first short story collection, Anti-Romantic, was published in 1966 and received the Odisha Sahitya Akademy Award. In 2009, Basanta Satpathynka Shreshtha Galpamala was published by the National Book Trust as part of a series on contemporary Indian literature. The Bharatiya Jnanpith also published Hindi translations of his short stories. The Anti-Romantics, English translation of his short stories was published by the Sahitya Akademi in 2022. Satpathy translated Lamb's Shakespeare Stories (1977), The Travels of Ulysses (1970) into Odia. He translated selected English one-act plays into Odia under the title Nabanatika (1960). At Mayadhar Mansingh's suggestion, he compiled Sanchayana (1974), an anthology of Odia poetry modelled on Palgrave's Golden Treasury, published by the Sahitya Akademi. He translated Rabindranath Tagore's Raja into Odia (1979) and adapted Fakir Mohan's novel Chha Mana Atha Guntha into a play titled Champa (1970). He also authored Fakir Mohan: His Life and Literature (1984), which included a biographical essay and six translated stories. Between the 1960s and 1970s, Satpathy's essays appeared in the Sahitya Akademi's journal Indian Literature, including pieces such as "Nilasaila," "One or Two Outstanding Books," "Neither Bang nor Whimper," and "Much Paper, More Poverty." He also wrote a cricket-themed satirical essay, Sir Roger and Test Cricket (1960), modeled on Sir Roger de Coverley.

=== List of published works ===
Short Story Collections:

- Anti-Romantic (1966)
- Ganga o Gangi (1981)
- Hyderabad Angura (1982)
- Mamsashimananka Uddeshyare (1982)
- Gotae Alu (1982)
- Nidashraya (1983)
- Akashi Phula (1983)
- Ajaga Ghaa (1983)
- Major Operation (1984)
- Pua Pain Jhia
- Basanta Satpathy nka Shrestha Galpa (2009)

Translations:

- Nabanatika (1960) – translations of modern English one-act plays
- Du'iti Bhramana Kahani (1970) – translations of travel narratives
- Lambanka Shakespeare Kahani Mala (1977) – adaptation of Lamb's tales from Shakespeare
- Raja (1979) – translation of Rabindranath Tagore's play
- Ahamiya Sahityara Itihas

Edited anthology:

- Sanchayana (1974) – anthology of modern Odia poetry compiled and edited, published by Sahitya Akademi

Essays:

- Fakir Mohan: His Life and Literature (1984) – a critical-biographical work with translated stories and essays

Books in English translation:

- The Anti-romantics (Tr. Jagannath Das)
- The One-eyed Chick and Other Stories (Tr. Bikram K. Das, Sumanyu Satpathy)
- When Their Eyes Met and Other Stories (Tr. Bikram K. Das)

Autobiography:

- Manepade (2019)

== Reception ==
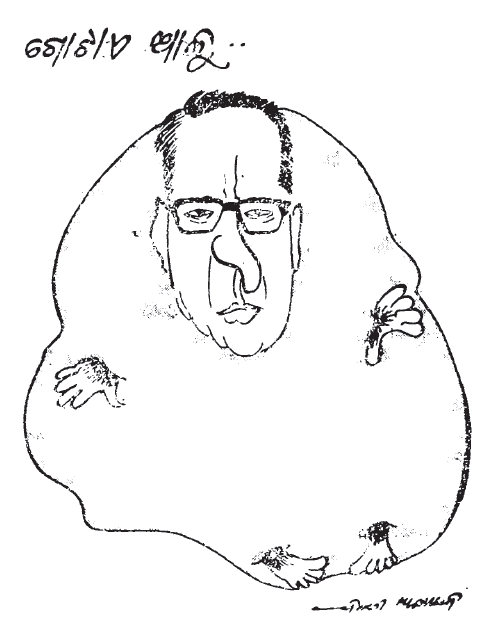
A cartoon of Satpathy's story Gotie Alu by Shilpi Ashok

Basanta Satpathy "belonged to the tradition of Fakir Mohan Senapati". His short stories, have been noted for their "distinct use of humour and stylistic clarity". Satakadi Hota characterised his humour as a "philosophical outlook that transforms sorrow into amusement." In the context of postcolonial Indian literature, Professor Himansu Mahapatra observed that Satpathy's stories extend the discourse of postcolonialism into the mainstream literary domain. Kankan Basu wrote in The Hindu:

The stories are not without an occasional dash of humour as is evident in 'When Their Eyes Met' with its confused characters playing romantic musical chairs. Quite a few stories have an unexpected twist towards the end. But it is his concern for the bigger and more serious issues that touch the reader.

His birth centenary was commemorated by the Odisha Sahitya Akademi on 20 October 2013 at the Utkal Sangeet Mahavidyalaya, Bhubaneswar. A parallel centenary celebration was also organised by the Sahitya Akademi (New Delhi), which featured participation by noted literary scholars and critics including Harish Trivedi, Srinivas Rao, and former Akademi President Vishwanath Prasad Tiwari. In his memory, the annual Basanta Satpathy Memorial Lecture is held on his birth anniversary, featuring talks by leading intellectuals and literary figures from across India.
