= Krishna Chandra Bhanj Deo =

Raja of Mayurbhanj (1868 - 1882)

- Maharaja

Raja of Mayurbhanj
- Reign: c. 1868 – 29 May 1882
- Predecessor: Shrinath Bhanj Deo
- Successor: Sriram Chandra Bhanj Deo
- Born: c. 1840
- Died: 29 May 1882
- Issue: Sriram Chandra Bhanj Deo; Shyam Chandra Mardraj Harichandan; Shridam Chandra Bhanj Deo; Rasal Manjari; Ratna Manjari; Labanya Manjari; Bilas Manjari
- House: Mayurbhanj
- Dynasty: Bhanja
- Father: Sitanath Bhanj Deo

Krishna Chandra Bhanj Deo was the Raja of Mayurbhanj from 1868 until his death in 1882.

== Early life and family ==
He was born in 1848 to Sitanath Bhanj Deo, the second son of Jadunath Bhanj Deo, the Raja of Mayurbhanj. He married and had issue: three sons, Sriram Chandra Bhanj Deo; Shyam Chandra Mardraj Harichandan, who was adopted by the Nilgiri family; and Shridam Chandra Bhanj Deo; and four daughters. His daughters were Rasal Manjari, Ratna Manjari, Labanya Manjari, and Bilas Manjari, and they respectively married the Raja of Porahat, the Raja of Panchkot, the zamindar of Barpali, and the Thakur of Anandapur.

== Succession ==
Since his uncle, Shrinath Bhanj Deo, had no issue to succeed him as the Raja of Mayurbhanj, Krishna was considered the heir presumptive to his uncle’s title, rank, and dignity. However, his uncle was not fond of him and, to prevent Krishna from succeeding, adopted Jugal Kishore, a Brahmin boy, as his designated successor. This decision was not well received, and in fact the then Superintendent of the Orissa Tributary States, T.E. Ravenshaw, strongly advocated Krishna’s claim to the throne of Mayurbhanj. Upon Shrinath’s death on in 1868, Krishna succeeded him as the Raja of Mayurbhanj.

== Reign ==
The early days of his reign were marked by conspiracies to oust him from the throne of Mayurbhanj. These conspiracies were backed by the widow of his deceased uncle. Later, after examining all claims, T.E. Ravenshaw wrote to the Secretary of the Government of Bengal, requesting that Krishna’s succession be officially recognised and acknowledged. Accordingly, the Lieutenant-Governor of Bengal recognised Krishna as the Raja of Mayurbhanj. The sub-division of Bamanghati, which was taken under the direct control of the British Government in 1866 on account of the mismanagement by his uncle, Shrinath Bhanj Deo, was restored to him in 1878. He instituted a programme of reform in the police, jail, revenue, public works, and judicial departments, among others, and remarkable development was seen in the fields of education, communication, and public health. He also constructed roads. In 1879, when the Roman Catholic Missionary made its first settlement in Nangalakata, he granted them 16 sq. miles (approx. 41.43 sq. km) of land. The mission founded a new village in 1880 and named it Krushnachandrapur after him.

== Philanthropy ==
To raise the high school at Cuttack to the status of a college, he donated Rs. 27,000.

== Death ==
He died on 29 May 1882 and was succeeded by Sriram Chandra Bhanj Deo to his title, rank, and dignity.

== Honours ==
The hereditary title of Raja was conferred on him by the British Government by a sanad in 1874. The title of Maharaja was conferred on him as a personal distinction on the occasion of the Delhi Durbar of 1877. It was awarded in recognition of his good governance and liberal public benefactions.
