= Tribikram Bhanj Deo =

Raja of Mayurbhanj (1813–1822)

Raja of Mayurbhanj
- Reign: c. 1813 – c. 1822
- Predecessor: Damodar Bhanj Deo
- Successor: Jadunath Bhanj Deo
- Died: c. 1822
- Issue: Jadunath Bhanj Deo
- House: Mayurbhanj (by adoption); Keonjhar (by birth)
- Dynasty: Bhanja
- Father: Pratap Balbhadra Bhanj

Tribikram Bhanj Deo was the Raja of Mayurbhanj from 1813 until his death in 1822.

== Early life, family, and succession ==
He was born to Pratap Balbhadra Bhanj, the Raja of Keonjhar. When Damodar Bhanj Deo, the Raja of Mayurbhanj, was on his deathbed and had no issue, either of the body or adoptive, to succeed him, he nominated Tribikram as his successor. However, Damodar's widows, Sumitra Devi and Jamuna Devi, did not carry out his wishes. Although the officers of the state attempted to transfer the administration to Tribikram, they failed. Consequently, the widows of the deceased ruler governed Mayurbhanj: the first, Sumitra Devi, from 1796 to 1810, and the latter, Jamuna Devi, from 1810 to 1813, until succession eventually devolved upon Tribikram. Nevertheless, the East India Company had recognised him as the ruler of Mayurbhanj in 1810.

He married and had an issue: a son, Jadunath Bhanj Deo.

== Reign ==
He executed agreements in 1812 and 1815 with the East India Company. The former concerned tribute, whereby the annual tribute paid by the State was fixed at Rs. 1,001. By the latter, he agreed to forego his claim to levy a tax on pilgrims passing through the State on their journey to and from Jagannath in Puri.

== Death ==
He died in 1822, and his son, Jadunath Bhanj Deo, succeeded to his title, rank, and dignity.
