= Shrinath Bhanj Deo =

Raja of Mayurbhanj (1863 - 1868)

Raja of Mayurbhanj
- Reign: c. 1863 – c. 1868
- Predecessor: Jadunath Bhanj Deo
- Successor: Krishna Chandra Bhanj Deo
- Died: c. 1868
- House: Mayurbhanj
- Dynasty: Bhanja
- Father: Jadunath Bhanj Deo

Shrinath Bhanj Deo was the Raja of Mayurbhanj from 1863 until his death in 1868.

== Biography ==
He was born to Jadunath Bhanj Deo, the Raja of Mayurbhanj. Upon his father's death in 1863, he succeeded to his title, rank, and dignity. He proved himself a weak and incapable ruler. During his reign, the affairs of state fell into disarray. The people of Bamanghati and Upperbhag resorted to looting and rioting. In response, the administration of Bamanghati was taken over by the Deputy Commissioner of Singhbhum in 1866, and a police station was established at Bankati to keep the people of Upperbhag in check. He built Banthia Jagannath, a temple, in Baripada.

He died in 1868. He had, during his lifetime, adopted a Brahmin boy as his son and wished for him to succeed to his title, rank, and dignity; however, this idea was opposed by all, and upon his death, he was succeeded by his nephew, Krishna Chandra Bhanj Deo.
