= Kichakeshwari Temple =

Temple in India

Coordinates: 21.553°N 85.495°E

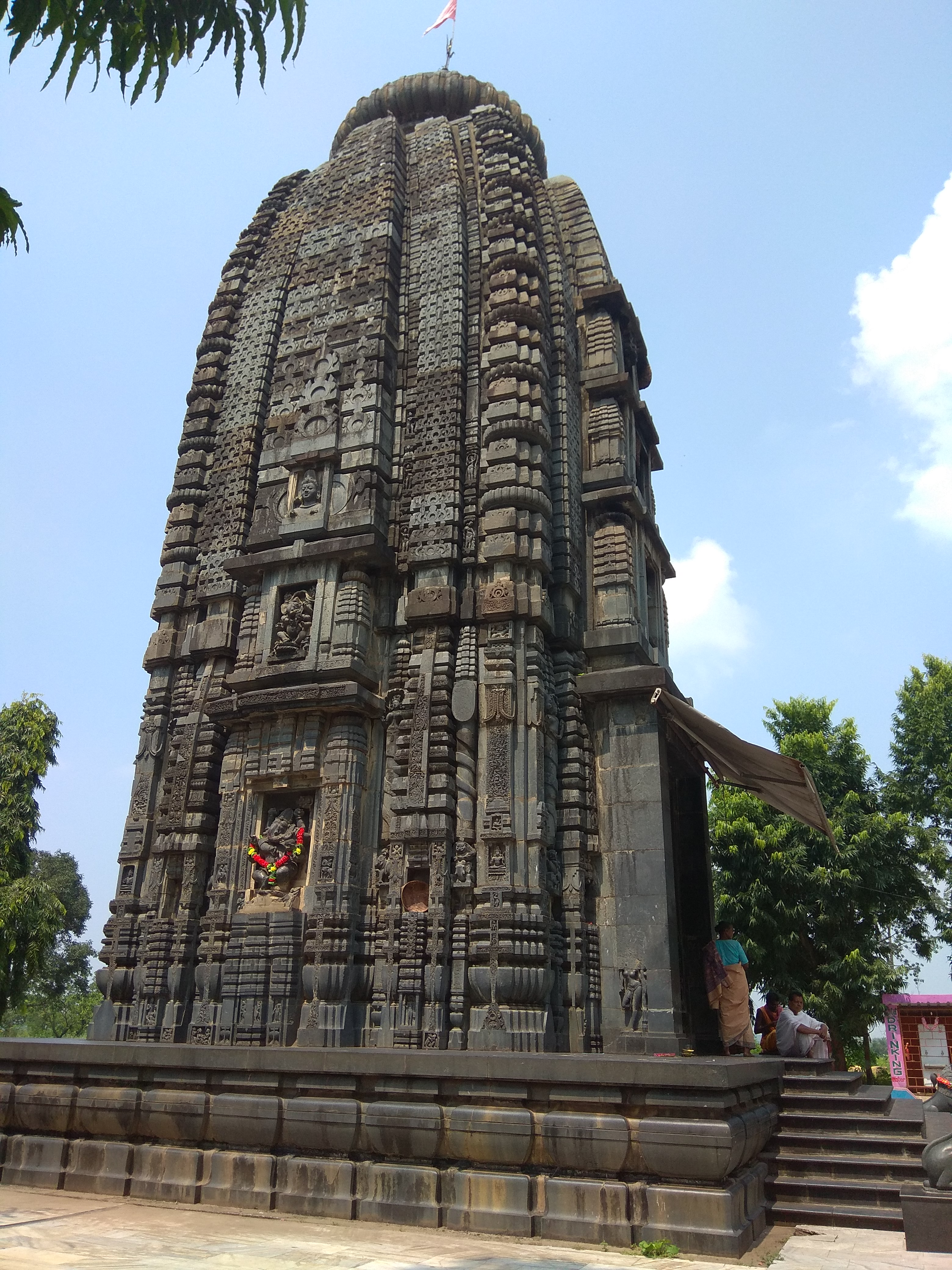

Religion
- Affiliation: Hinduism
- District: Mayurbhanj
- Deity: Kichakeshwari Debi

Location
- Location: Khiching
- State: Odisha
- Country: India
- Interactive map of Kichakeshwari Temple

Architecture
- Type: Temple built from Black Stone; Kalinga Architecture
- Temple: 2
- Type: Cultural
- Reference no.: S-OR-170
- Collection circle: Mayurbhanj

Kichakeshwari Temple (Odia: କୀଚକେଶ୍ଵରୀ ମନ୍ଦିର) is temple of Hindu Goddess Chamunda alias Kali located in Khiching, which was the ancient capital of the Bhanja rulers, located about 205 km from Balasore and 150 km from Baripada in the Mayurbhanj district of north Odisha, India.

== History ==
The largest temple of the town is dedicated to Goddess Kichakeswari, the family goddess of the ruling chiefs of Mayurbhanj. The Goddess Kichakeswari was not only ishtadevata of Bhanj dynasty but also the state deity. The original temple dates back to 7th or 8th Century, with repairs done over the centuries.

The main temple opens to devotees early at 5 a.m. and closes down at 10 pm. It, however, remains closed between 12 noon to 3 pm.

=== Architecture ===
The temple, made of chlorite, is architecturally brilliant and well carved from its outer surface. This temple is one of the most impressive temple of Kalinga architecture. The style of the temple is contemporary of the Brahmeshwara and the Lingaraj temples of Bhubaneswar. Height of the temple is 100 feet (30 m) and total area is 1,764 square feet (163.9 m^{2}).

The original temple was built somewhere in the 7th or the 8th century and was in bad shape as it had been vandalized. The erstwhile and last ruler of Princely State of Mayurbhanj, Maharaja Pratap Chandra Bhanj Deo was appalled at its state. He rehabilitated and reconstructed the temple in 1934, spending approximately Rs. 85,000, and taking care not to disturb original sculptures of Parasvadevatas, the Chaitya arches, the amorous couples, the scroll works and the arabesques, which can still be seen in the original portions of the temple.

The temple is made up of black chlorite which faces towards the east and consists of rekha vimana and stands over a high platform of 1.20 meters. The interior is single roomed where the Goddess deity is present and worshipped. The exteriors of temple is highly decorated, with magnificent sculptors like nayakas, naga-nagin, Ganesha, Kirtimukha, Khakharamundi and other divine god and goddess. The huge pillars sculpted with Nagin are unique heritage of this temple.

Inside the complex there is a well preserved brick structure known as Itamundhi.

=== Iconography ===
The shrine contains a large ten-armed fearsome skeletal image of Chamunda-Kali with striking veins, ribs and sunken belly, wearing a garland of skulls and seated over a dead body.

== Museum ==
The Khiching Museum is the second oldest museum in the state of Odisha. During the time of excavation by Archaeological Survey of India in the year 1908 several images of gods and goddess where found including the images of Buddha. These are preserved in a museum housed within the temple compound, which was constructed by Maharaja Purna Chandra Bhanjdeo in the year 1922.

The museum has the life-size excavated idols of Durga, Ganesha, Parsvanatha, Tara, Parvati, Ardhanageswar, Vaishnavi, Nandi, Kartikeya, Avalokiteswar, Dhyani Buddha, Mahishasuramardini, Uma, Maheshwara and female devotees on display. The museum has exhibits like the copper and iron implements, terracotta figurines, seals, ornaments, potteries, coins, stone tools and various fragments of the temples. The courtyard of the museum has several sculpted parts of ancient temples on display in open.

The presence of Buddha and Avalokiteśvara idols suggest, a commendable amalgamation of religion and culture. It mirrors the refined religious tolerance exercised by the rulers, as far back as in the 10th century AD.

== Gallery ==
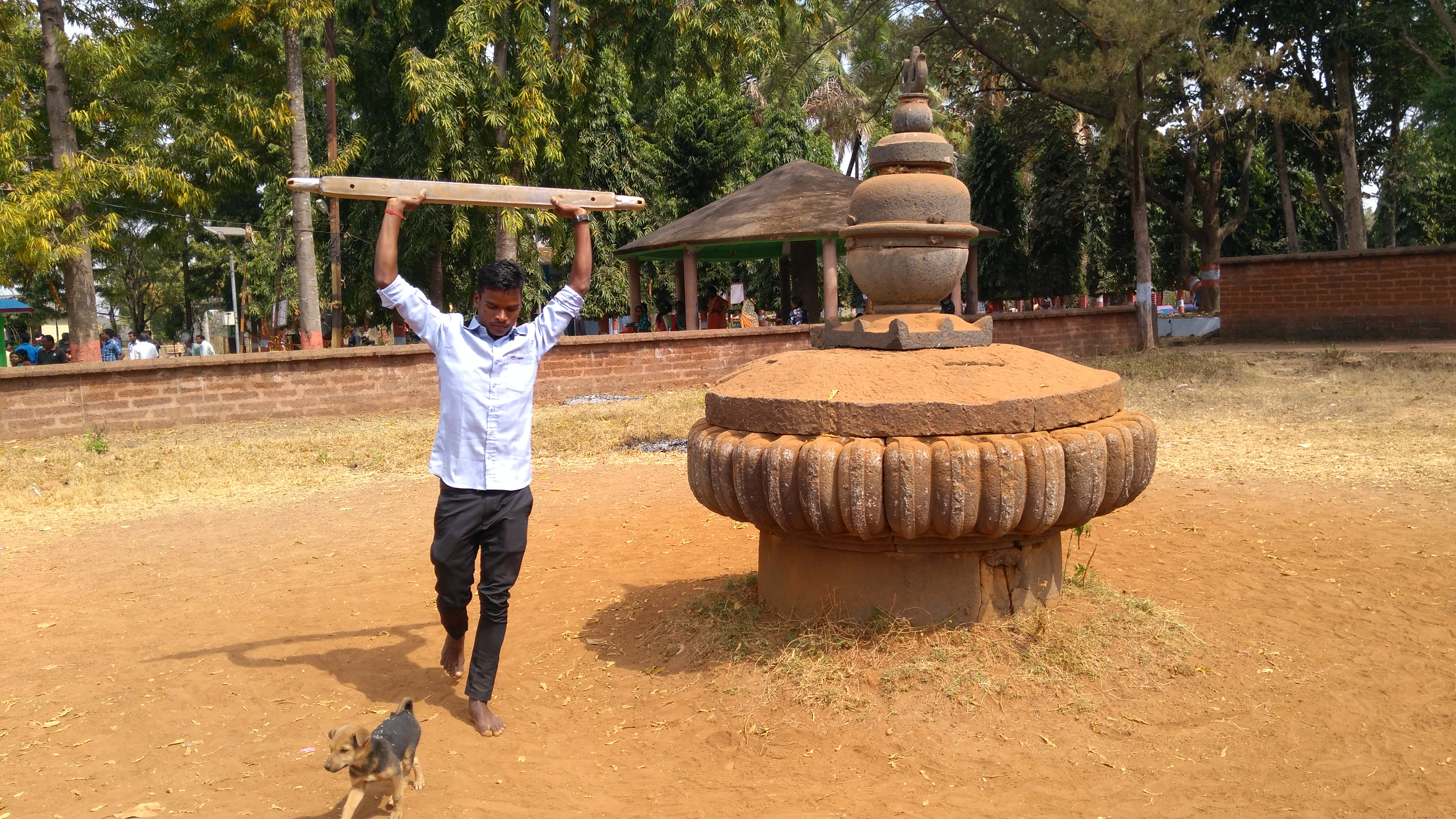

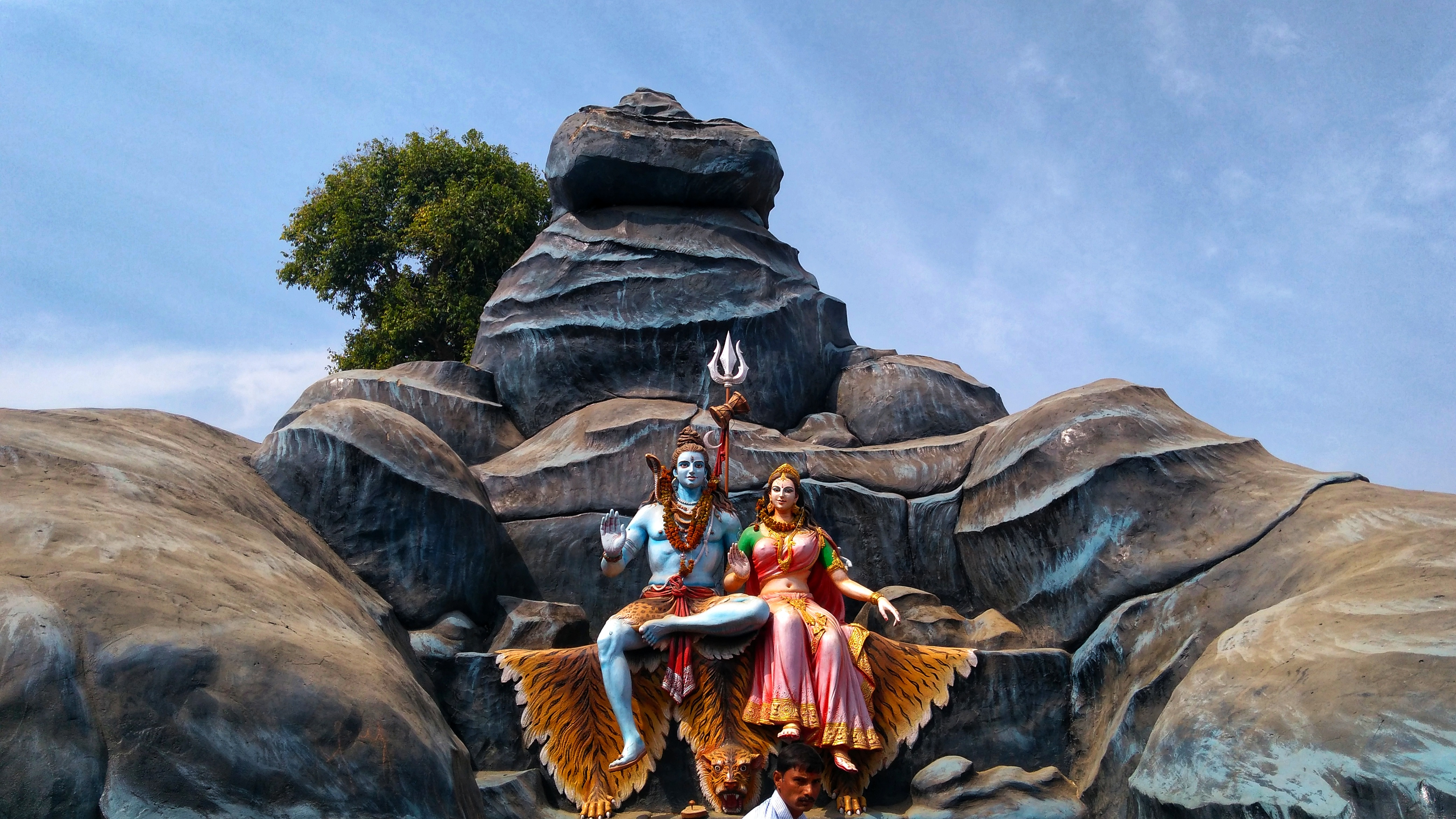

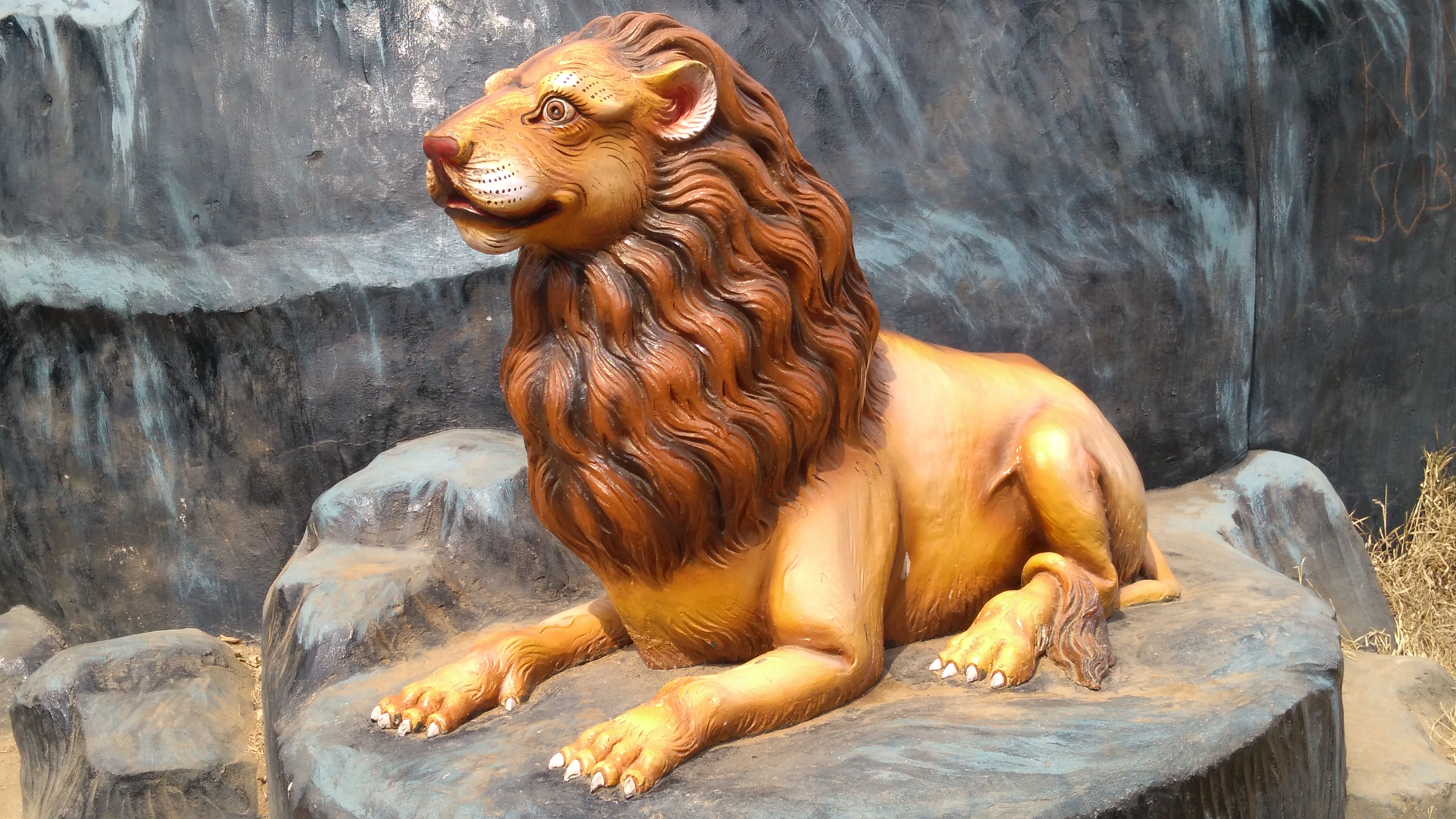

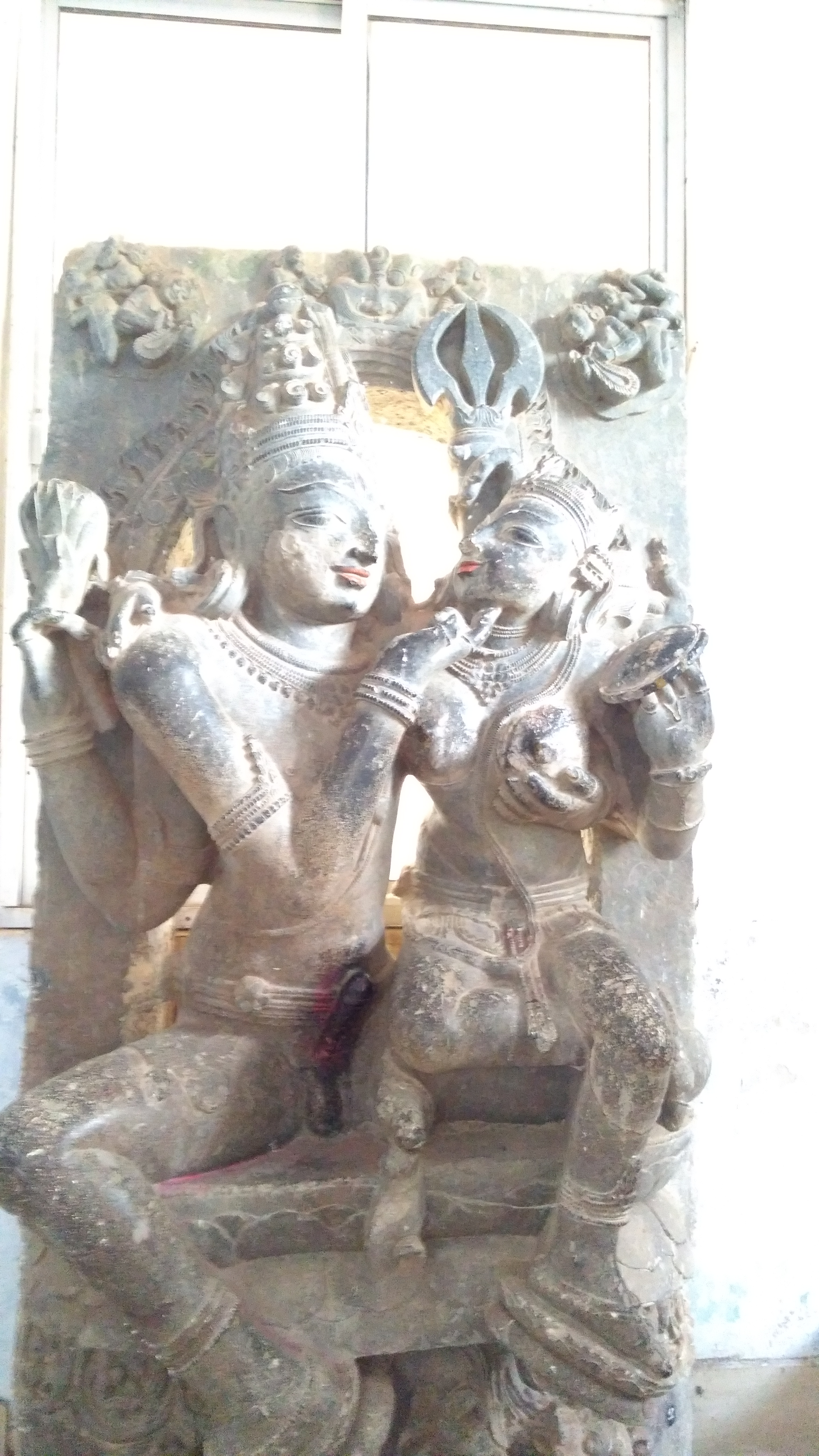

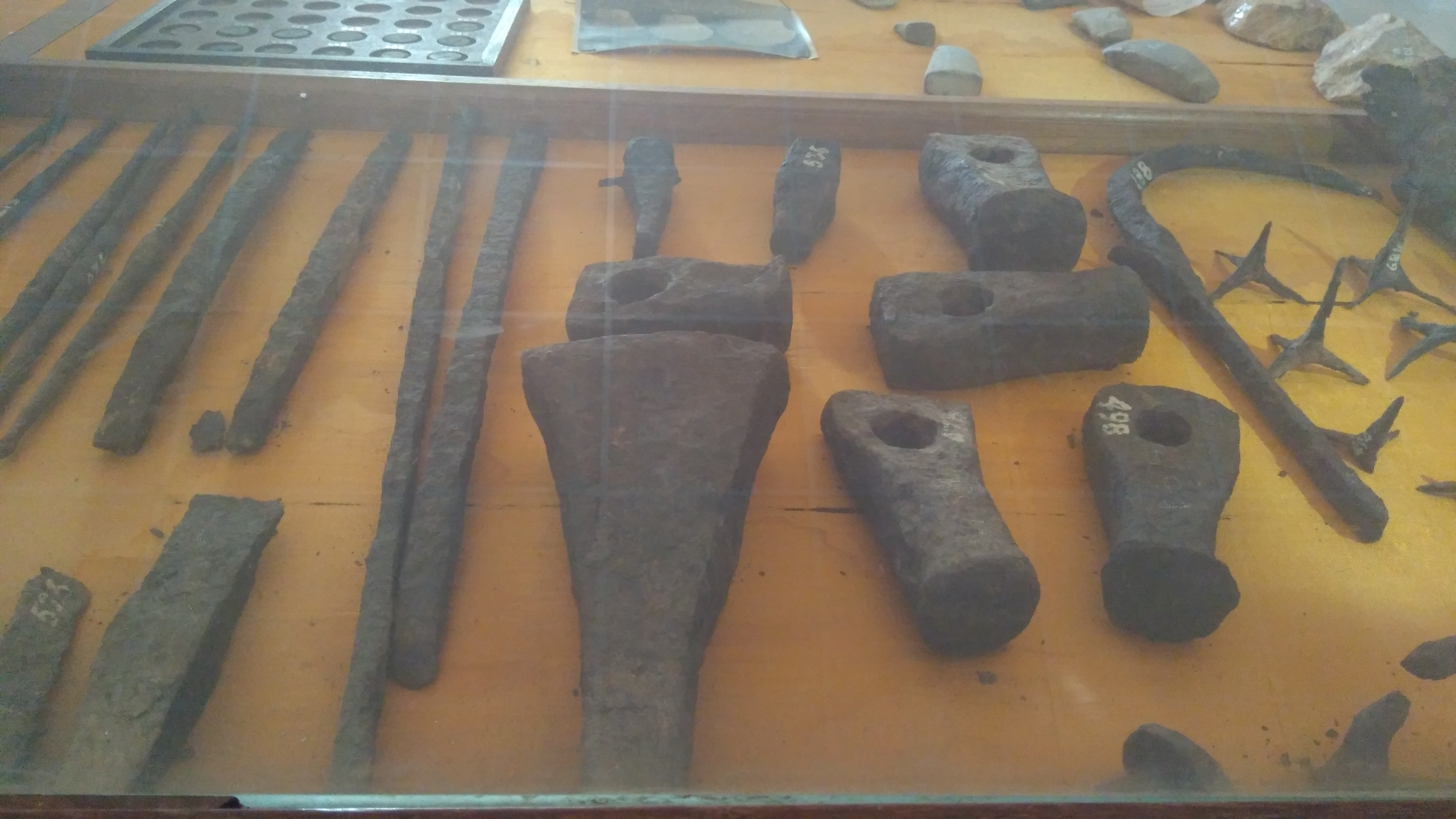

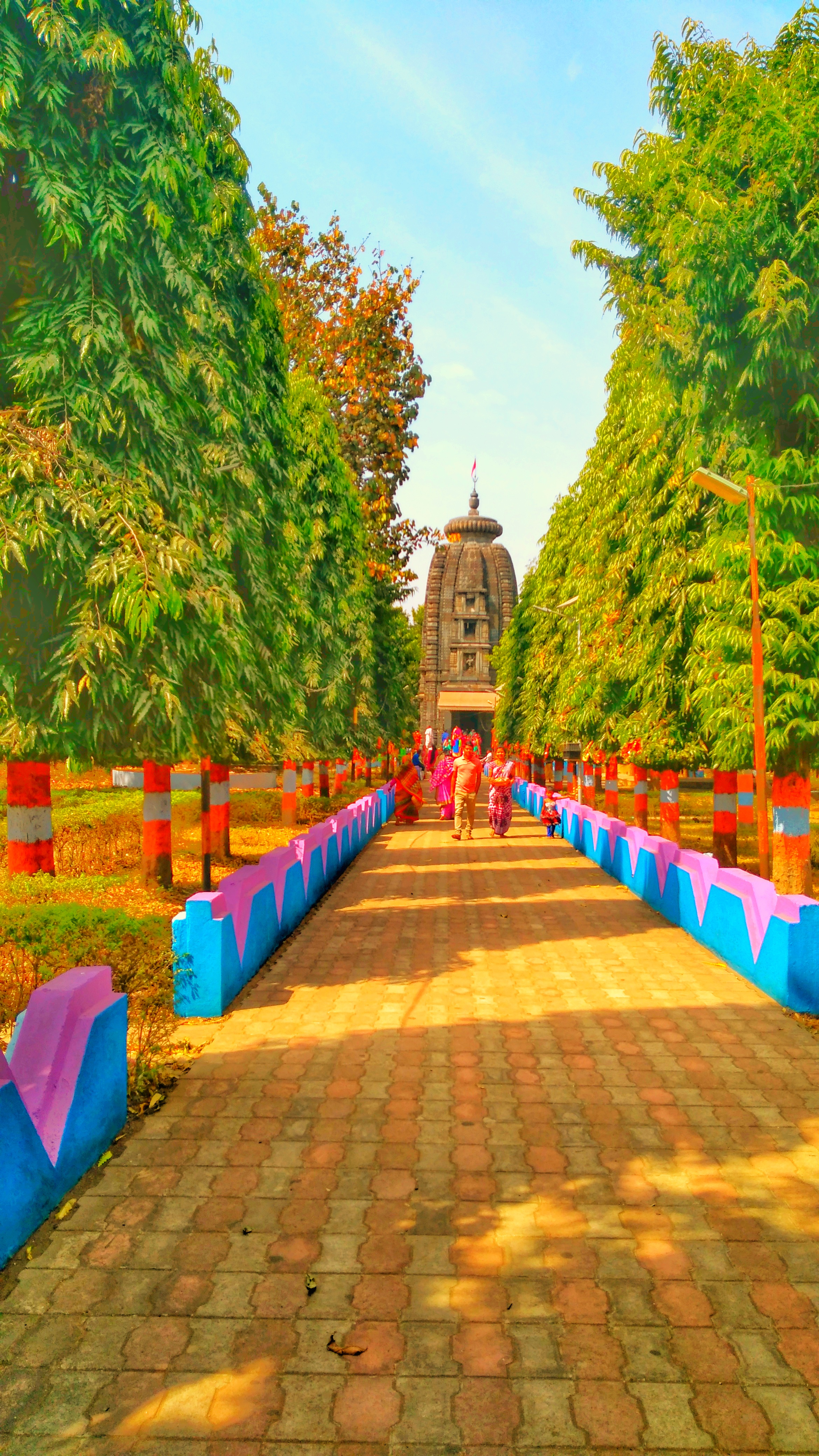
