= Jadunath Bhanj Deo =

Raja of Mayurbhanj (1822 - 1863)

Raja of Mayurbhanj
- Reign: c. 1822 – c. 1863
- Predecessor: Tribikram Bhanj Deo
- Successor: Shrinath Bhanj Deo
- Died: c. 1863
- Issue: Shrinath Bhanj Deo; Sitanath Bhanj Deo; Dwarkanath Bhanj Deo
- House: Mayurbhanj
- Dynasty: Bhanja
- Father: Tribikram Bhanj Deo

Jadunath Bhanj Deo was the Raja of Mayurbhanj from 1822 until his death in 1863.

== Early life and family ==
He was born to Tribikram Bhanj Deo. He married and had three sons: Shrinath Bhanj Deo, Sitanath Bhanj Deo, and Dwarkanath Bhanj Deo.

== Reign ==
He succeeded his father as the Raja of Mayurbhanj upon his death in 1822. During his reign, in 1829, Mayurbhanj entered into a formal treaty engagement with the East India Company. He was granted the title of Maharaja as a personal distinction by the British for his role in quelling the rebellion in the Kolhan. He was granted a khilat by the East India Company in 1840 for the services he rendered. He had Baripada enlarged into a town. When the Mahants of the Math at Jashipur approached him and requested a consolidated sanad (transl. charter, warrant, or deed) encompassing all the grants previously conferred upon them by the rulers of Mayurbhanj, he granted them such a sanad in 1852. He remained loyal to East India Company during the Indian Rebellion of 1857, in which his son-in-law partook. During this period, when it was feared that trouble might arise, he maintained peace within his own dominions. He tried to persuade his son-in-law to abandon his rebellious attitude. In view of the services rendered, the political officer recommended to his superior authorities that Jadunath be conferred the title of Maharajadhiraj Bahadur.

== Death ==
He died in 1863 and was succeeded by his son, Shrinath Bhanj Deo, to his title, rank, and dignity.
