= Mayurbhanj State Bank =

Bank in Mayurbhanj State

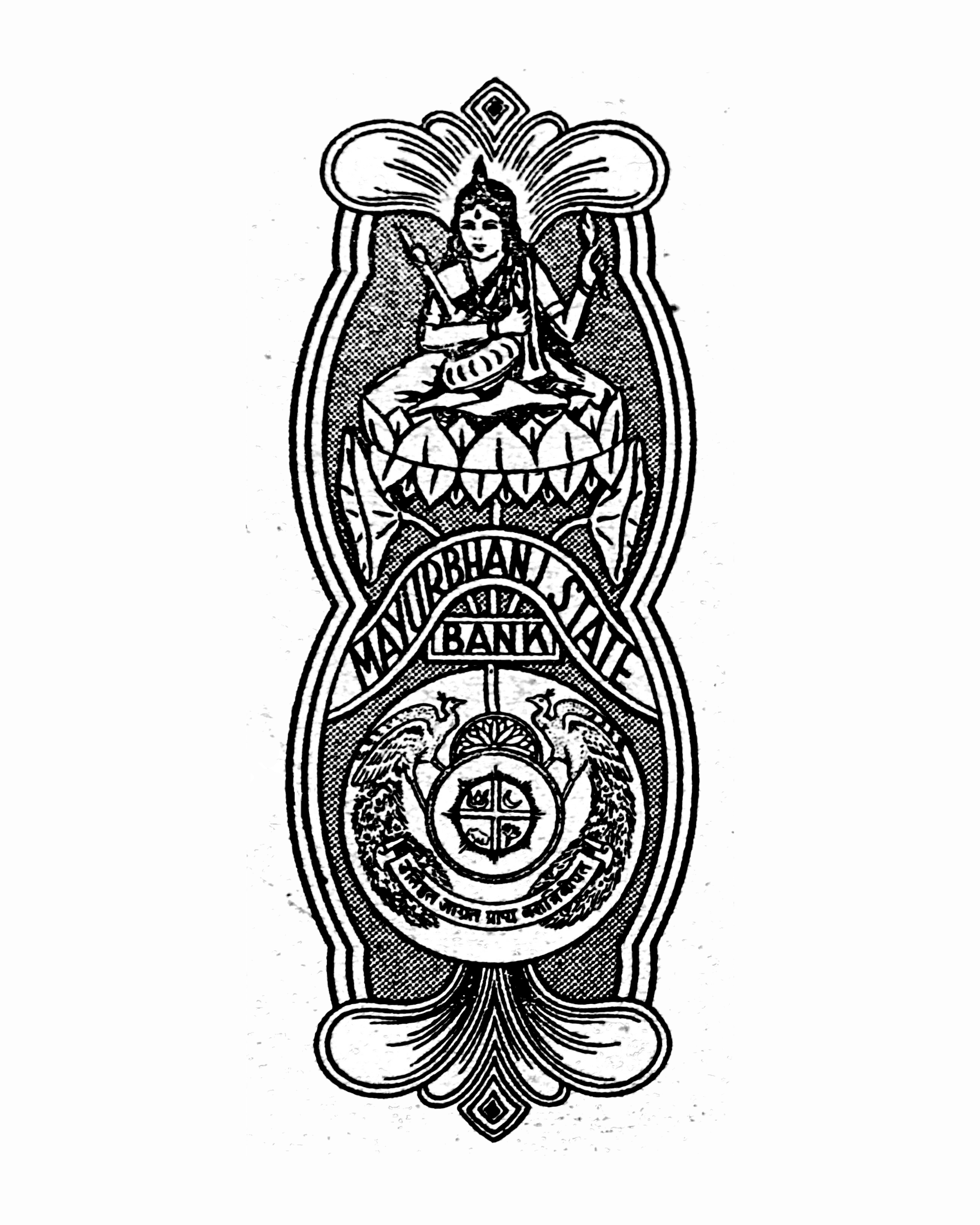
- Company type: Public sector
- Industry: Banking
- Founded: 2 May 1938; 88 years ago
- Founder: Pratap Chandra Bhanj Deo
- Defunct: 4 May 1961
- Fate: Merged with State Bank of India
- Successor: State Bank of India
- Headquarters: Baripada
- Area served: Mayurbhanj

Mayurbhanj State Bank was a public sector bank that had its headquarters at Baripada, Odisha, India.

== History ==
Pratap Chandra Bhanj Deo, the Maharaja of Mayurbhanj, established the Mayurbhanj State Bank on 2 May 1938 to promote the growth of industries and commerce in Mayurbhanj. On 1 May 1938, an extraordinary issue of the Mayurbhanj State Gazette was published which announced the rules and regulations relating to its constitution. These rules declared that it was to be a department of the state under the general control and direction of the state authorities. A provision stated that it could not go into liquidation except by the order of the ruler of Mayurbhanj. The initial capital for the bank was provided by the state.

It had its headquarters at Baripada. It had two branches, one at Karanjia and the other at Rairangpur. The total working capital and deposits of the bank were 34,00,000 rupees and 32,00,000 rupees, respectively, on 31 March 1944.

== Epilogue ==
After the independence of India in 1947, Mayurbhanj signed the instrument of accession to join India. Following the merger of Mayurbhanj into Odisha in 1949 it operated for a period under the Government of Odisha. It was merged with the State Bank of India on 4 May 1961.

== See also ==
- Banking in India
- List of banks that have merged to form the State Bank of India
