= Sriram Chandra Bhanj Deo =

Maharaja of Mayurbhanj from 1882 to 1912

Maharaja Sri Rama Chandra Bhanja Deo
- ମହାରାଜ ଶ୍ରୀ ରାମଚନ୍ଦ୍ର ଭଞ୍ଜଦେଓ
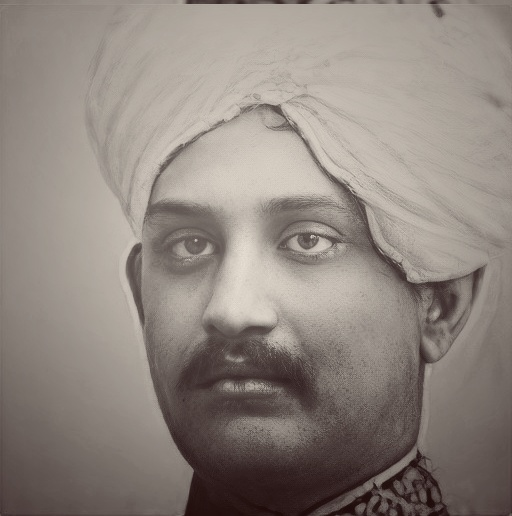
- Born: 17 December 1870
- Died: 22 February 1912 (aged 41); Calcutta, Bengal Presidency, British India
- Spouses: Lakshmi Kumari Devi (m. 1896; died 1902) Sucharu Devi (m. 1904)
- Children: Purna Chandra Bhanjadeo, Pratap Chandra Bhanjadeo, Dhrubendra Chandra Bhanjadeo, Jyoti Manjari Devi
- Parent: Krishna Chandra Bhanj Deo

Maharaja of Mayurbhanj
- Reign: 29 May 1882 – 22 February 1912
- Predecessor: Krishna Chandra Bhanj Deo
- Successor: Purna Chandra Bhanja Deo
- House: Bhanja dynasty (Mayurbhanj branch)

Maharaja Sri Rama Chandra Bhanja Deo (Odia: ମହାରାଜ ଶ୍ରୀ ରାମଚନ୍ଦ୍ର ଭଞ୍ଜଦେବ; 17 December 1870 – 22 February 1912) was the Maharaja of Mayurbhanj State of India.

== Personal life ==
=== Early life ===
Sriram Chandra Bhanja Deo was only eleven years old when his father, Maharaja Krishna Chandra Bhanja Deo, the ruler of the Mayurbhanj State, died. On 29 May 1882, Sriram Chandra Bhanja Deo succeeded to the throne. At that time, the State was under the Court of Wards, governed by a British Commissioner P. Wylly, and the affairs of the state remained under the control of his grandmother, the Dowager Maharani of Mayurbhanj. On 15 August 1892, the Maharaja, having reached the age of 21, came of age and formally assumed the role of Maharaja.

=== Matrimonial alliances ===
He was first married to Maharani Lakshmi Kumari Devi, daughter of a zamindar of Panchkot in Bengal, who died in 1902. In 1904, he married Maharani Sucharu Devi, a daughter of Maharshi Keshub Chandra Sen. He had two sons, Purna Chandra Bhanja Deo and Pratap Chandra Bhanja Deo with his first wife. Purna Chandra Bhanja Deo succeeded him to the throne, while Pratap Chandra Bhanja Deo succeeded his elder brother to the throne after the former's death. He had a son, Dhrubendra Chandra Bhanja Deo and two daughters of his second wife, Sucharu Devi. Dhrubendra Chandra Bhanja Deo became an air force pilot and died in action during the Second World War. The elder daughter was married to the Maharaja of Vizianagaram and the younger daughter, Rani Jyoti Manjari Devi was married to Mahant Sarveshwar Das, the Raja Bahadur of Nandgaon, a princely state of the erstwhile Central Provinces and Berar.

=== Death ===
Maharaja died due to an accident, while on a hunting trip, when he was accidentally injured by the bullet fired from the gun of his brother-in-law (brother of Sucharu Devi). He was severely injured and was treated in Calcutta, but died there of his injuries.

== Work ==
=== Administration ===
He worked for the all around development of Mayurbhanj and implemented various welfare schemes designed to help the people. He was revered as a philosopher king. He constituted the state council for administration in the state and brought about reforms in the sphere of language, health and administration.

During his reign, the scientific operation of iron mines was started for the first time and Gorumahisani mines were leased to the Tatas. In 1903, he commissioned a narrow-gauge railway line from Rupsa to Baripada known as Mayurbhanj State Railway. During his reign 474 miles of road were built in State connecting all divisional towns with Baripada. The Baripada Municipality was constituted by him in 1905. He also started an English High School with boarding facility, a government Press, a fully equipped hospital and a leper asylum in Baripada.

=== Art and culture ===
He was a great patron of Oriya art and culture. The famous Chhau dance of Orissa or "war-dance" was presented by him for a show in 1912 in Calcutta in honor of George V, the British emperor, who was impressed by its beauty and splendour.

He was also a patriot and great patron of the Odia language and presided over the first meeting of Utkal Samilani held on 3 December 1903.

=== Architecture ===
In 1892, he made major additions to the royal palace of Mayurbhanj, which has 126 rooms. The front of the palace resembles the Buckingham Palace, which was built in 1908. Two colleges, Maharaja Purna Chandra College, and the Government Women's College are now located inside the palace.

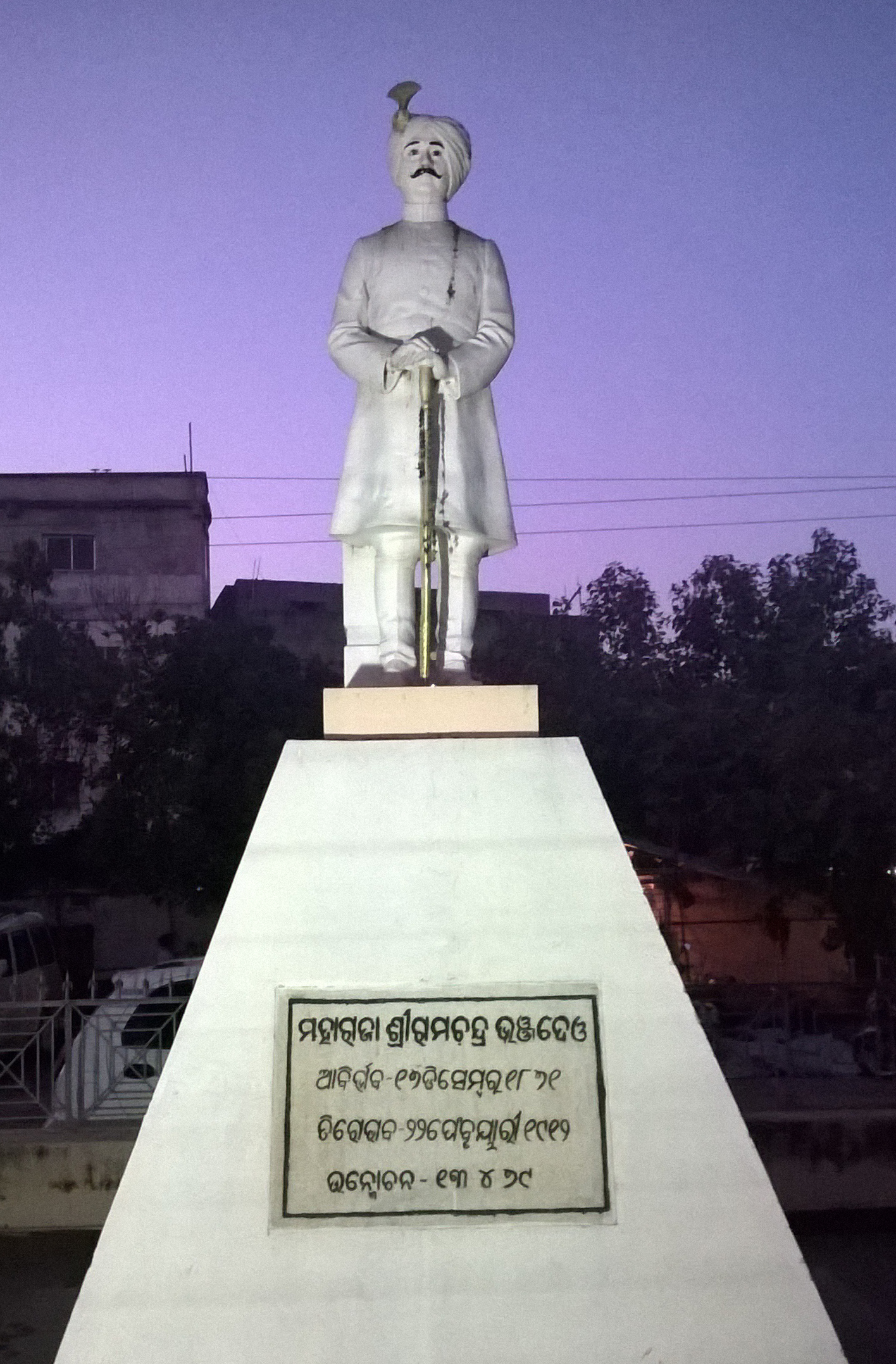
Statue of Sriram Chandra Bhanj Deo, ruler of Mayurbhanj State

== Honours ==
- Delhi Durbar Gold Medal – 1903.
- Maharaja title bestowed upon him by Lord Minto at the 1903 Delhi Durbar, which was later made hereditary in 1910.
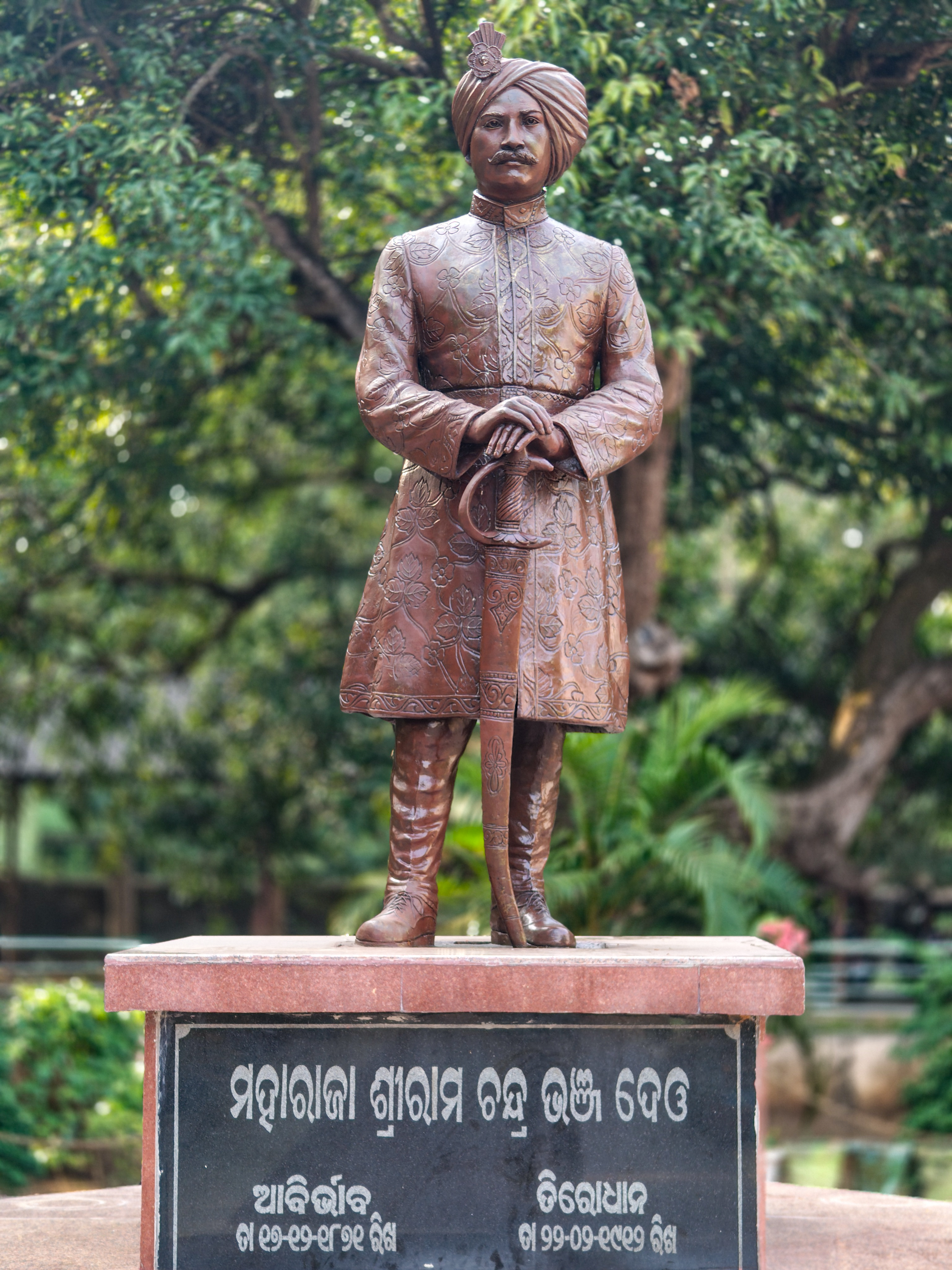
  Statue of Maharaja Sriram Chandra Bhanja Deo inside Maharaja Sriram Chandra Bhanja Deo University, Baripada

== Legacy ==
He died on 22 February 1912 at Mayurbhanj. He and his father Maharaja Krishna Chandra Bhanj Deo are widely acknowledged as the makers of modern Orissa. The legacy include;

- Sriram Chandra Bhanja Memorial Fund was established in 1920 in his memory to support irrigation in Mayurbhanj. Successive rulers of Mayurbhanj continued to contribute an annual sum of 10,000 rupees to it. The fund had 86,120 rupees in Mayurbhanj State Bank in 1960, of which 67,835 rupees was spent on various water supply schemes in Mayurbhanj.
- Srirama Chandra Bhanja Medical College and Hospital at Cuttack was named after him in year 1951, in recognition of the donation and efforts made by the ruler in his lifetime.
- Maharaja Sriram Chandra Bhanjdeo University, Baripada, a public university location in hometown of the Maharaja.

Political offices
Preceded by Maharaja Krishna Chandra Bhanj Deo	Maharaja of Mayurbhanj; 1882–1912	Succeeded by Maharaja Purna Chandra Bhanj Deo
