= Keonjhar State =

Princely state in India

Coordinates: 21°38′N 81°36′E

Keonjhar State କେନ୍ଦୁଝର
- Princely State of British India
- 12th century–1948
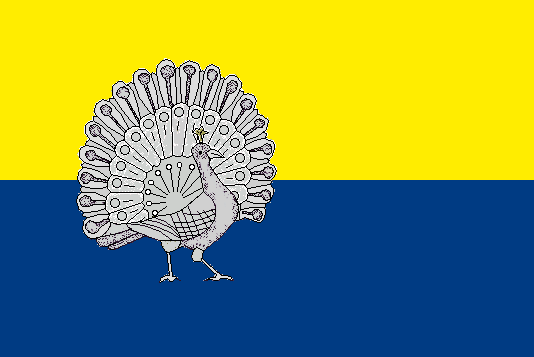
- Flag

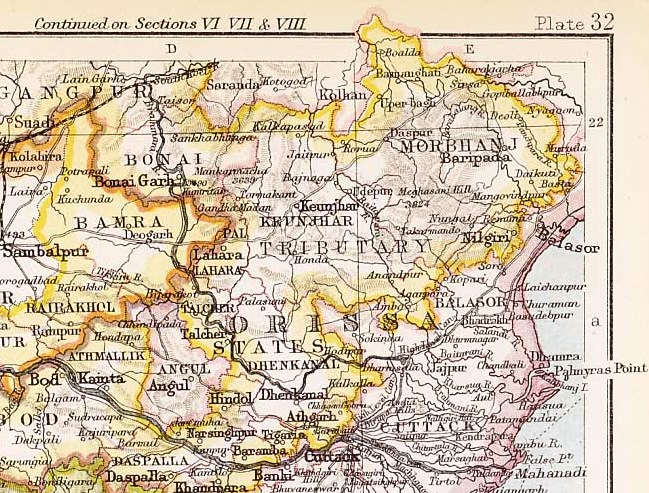
- Keonjhar State in the Imperial Gazetteer of India
- Area
  - 1931: 8,019 km^{2} (3,096 sq mi)
- Population
  - 1931: 460,609
- History
  - Established: 12th century
  - Accession to the Union of India: 1948
Succeeded by
India

Keonjhar State (Odia: କେନ୍ଦୁଝର), also known as Kendujhar, was one of the princely states of India during the period of the British Raj. The second largest of the states of the Orissa States Agency, it was located in present-day Kendujhar district, Odisha.

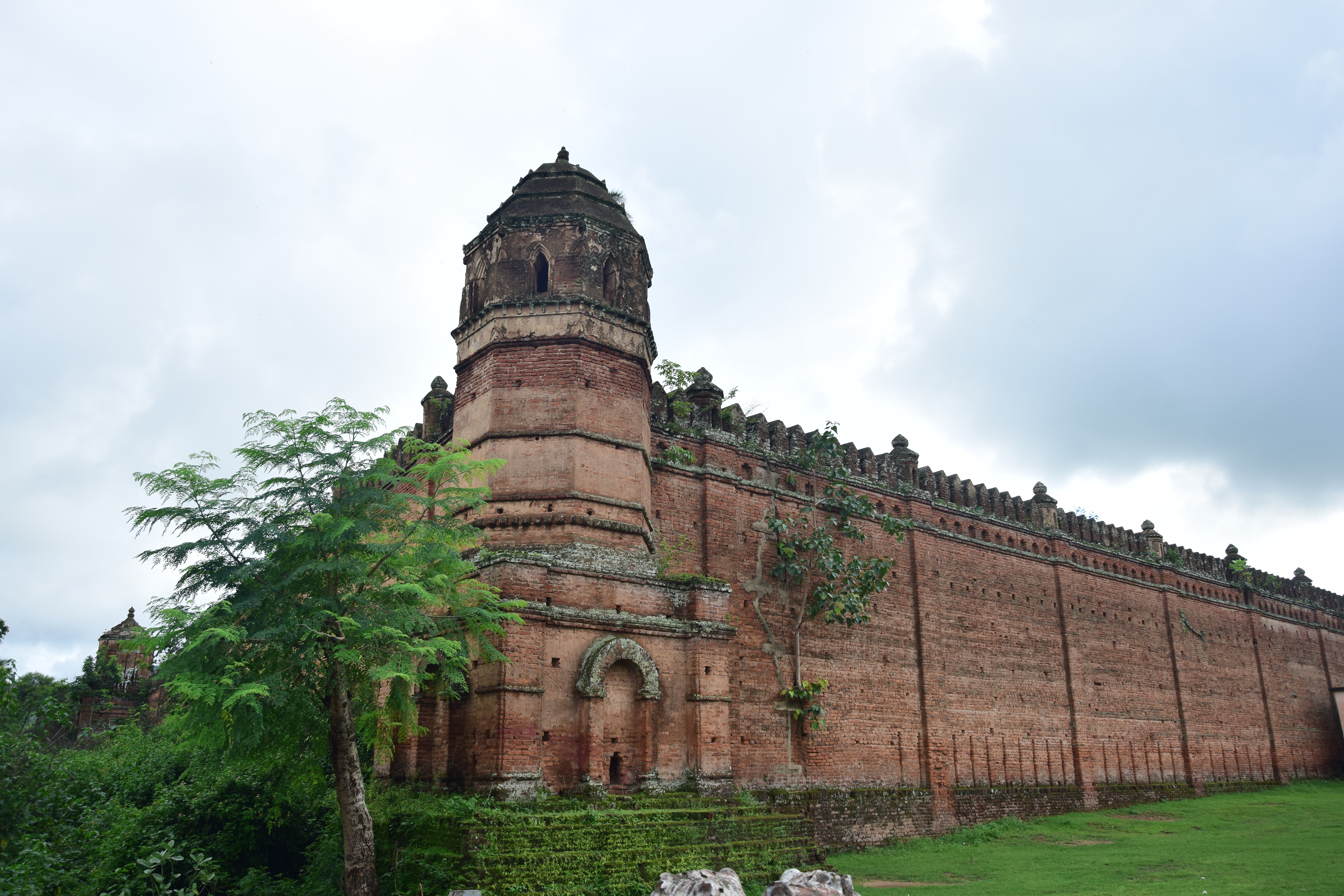
Kendujhargarh fort

The state was bounded in the north by Singhbhum District, in the east by the State of Mayurbhanj and Balasore District, in the south by Dhenkanal State and Cuttack District, and in the west by the states of Pal Lahara and Bonai. The state consisted of two clearly differentiated areas: Low Keonjhar, a region of flat river valleys — the main river being the Baitarani, and the High Keonjhar, an area of forests dominated by mountain ranges with the Gandhamadan reaching a height of 1078 m. The capital was at Keonjhar.

== History ==
According to traditions, Keonjhar State was founded during the 12th century rule of the Eastern Ganga dynasty when the founder Jyoti Bhanja of the Bhanja dynasty, who was the brother of Adi Bhanja of Mayurbhanj, was enthroned as the Raja of Keonjhar with the help of the dominant local Bhuyan clans. The influence of the Bhuyans on the enthronement rituals and regnal traditions of Keonjhar suggests a long-standing relationship with the kingdom.

Around the 14th century, a prince from Keonjhar named Ananga Bhanja, who was a nephew of the Raja of Keonjhar was named the king of Baudh by the local chieftains under Ganga rule.

After the independence of India in 1947 Keonjhar merged into Republic of India on 1 January 1948 following which it became the part of Keonjhar district (now Kendujhar).

== Rulers ==
The rulers of Keonjhar State of the Bhanja dynasty. The Keonjhar royal family adopted the emblems of the neighbouring State of Mayurbhanj, a peacock and the yellow and blue colours.

- Jyoti Bhanja (12th cen CE)
- ...
- Jagannath Bhanja (1688 - 1700)
- Raghunath Bhanja (1700 - 1719)
- Gopinath Bhanja (1719 - 1736)
- Narsingh Narayan Bhanja (1736 - 1757)
- Daneswar Narayan Bhanja (1757 - 1758)
- Jagateswar Narayan Bhanja (1758 - 1762)
- Pratap Balbhadra Bhanja (1762 - 1794)
- Janardan Bhanja (1794 - 1825)
- Gadadhar Narayan Bhanj Deo (1825 - 22 March 1861)
- Dhanurjai Narayan Bhanj Deo (4 September 1861 – 27 October 1905)
- Gopinath Narayan Bhanj Deo (27 Oct 1905 – 12 August 1926)
- Balbhadra Narayan Bhanj Deo (12 Aug 1926 – 1 January 1948)

=== Titular ===
- Balbhadra Narayan Bhanj Deo (1 January 1948 – 1963)
- Nrusingh Narayan Bhanj Deo (1963 – 1979)
- Anant Narayan Bhanj Deo (1979 – 1 December 2019)
- Dhananjay Bhanj Deo (1 December 2019 – current)

== See also ==
- Eastern States Agency
- Political integration of India
