= Kate Allenby (missionary) =

Australian missionary (1871–1931)

Kate Allenby (1871 - August 10, 1931) was an Australian missionary who primarily worked in India. She worked in the Queensland Baptist Missionary Society and founded the Mayurbhanj Mission later moved to Baripada. During her mission, she spread Christianity and education to many of the villages and tribes in India directing her work towards creating safe spaces for Women and Children. In India, she built multiple schools, an orphanage, and an asylum.

== Early life and education ==
Allenby was born in 1871 in Queensland, Australia. Her father, Joseph Allenby, was a hydropathist from Australia, and her mother, Mary Brady, was of Scottish descent but was originally from Ireland. She had an older brother who died 4 months before her birth. She grew up with Christian influence, as her family was a part of the Windsor Road Baptist Church. Her parents hoped her brother would become a minister; after his death, her parents pressured her to become a teacher to spread the gospel. Allenby had a younger sister who Allenby named Grace. Grace would work with Allenby in India.

After completing grade school she attended the University of Sydney. In university, she won the Fairfax Prize, an award for excellence in language studies. After University she studied under a homeopathic doctor, which eventually led her to take up nursing after she returned home from her first missionary trip.

== Mission ==
When she was 16, Allenby had a “call from god” to go out and spread the gospel to foreign lands. Following her graduation from university, on November 15, she arrived in Noakhalij, India under the guidance of Miss Lee, a city mission worker. When she arrived, she learned Bengali and began to go into Indian communities and spread the gospel. She returned home after a traumatic event caused her to have a breakdown in which she was encouraged to leave her work.

In December 1895, she arrived in Muyurbhanj, India after receiving a letter requesting her presence. Here in 1895 she founded the Evangelical Missionary Society of Mayurbhanj (EMSM). In Muyurbhanj, she went into villages and connected with women and children by sharing the gospel. Many of the women were very receptive and showed their admiration. Allenby built a home to nurse elders, but after the approval of the Mayurnunaj, she turned the home into an asylum. After the asylum was built she gained the support of Mission to Lepers to open the Leprosy House in 1896, which subsequently moved to Baripada in 1907.

As she continued going into communities to spread the word, she learned Oriya in order to reach more people. In these far communities, she often had a hard time navigating the land as she went on these missions by herself and there were no maps or any other resources. She also had little access to water and European food.

Many missionaries from all across Europe began to join her, and she built her first church in 1900. She hosted English classes and Sunday School for the surrounding villages. After her construction of the church, she built a school in Buripada that held English classes for boys and sewing classes for girls as well as taught them Christianity once a week.

After taking children into the mission house occasionally, and the famine in 1909, Allenby opened an orphanage at Rajabasa outside of Buripada in 1914.

== Death ==
After a fall in 1929, she refused to let doctors operate on her and her health worsened. On August 10, 1931, Allenby died from a stroke.
