= Mayurbhanj State =

Princely state of British India in modern-day Odisha

Coordinates: 21.94°N 86.72°E

- Princely State of British India
- c. 12th century–17 October 1948
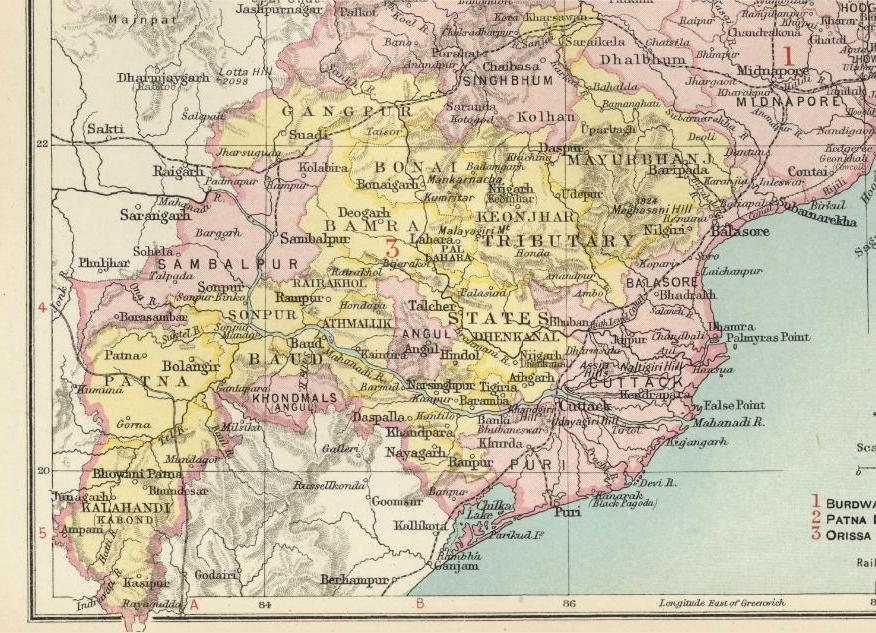
- Mayurbhanj State in a 1901 map of the Imperial Gazetteer of India.
- Capital: Khiching; Haripur (c. 1400); Baripada (c. 1800)
- Area
  - 1901: 10,982 km^{2} (4,240 sq mi)
- Population
  - 1901: 610,383
- History
  - Established: c. 12th century
  - Mughal rule: c. 1508
  - Maratha rule: c. 1751
  - British Raj: c. 1803
  - Independent State: 15 August 1947
  - Accession to the Union of India: 17 October 1948
  - Merged with Odisha: 1 January 1949
Preceded by	Succeeded by
Eastern Ganga dynasty	Dominion of India
- Today part of: Odisha, India

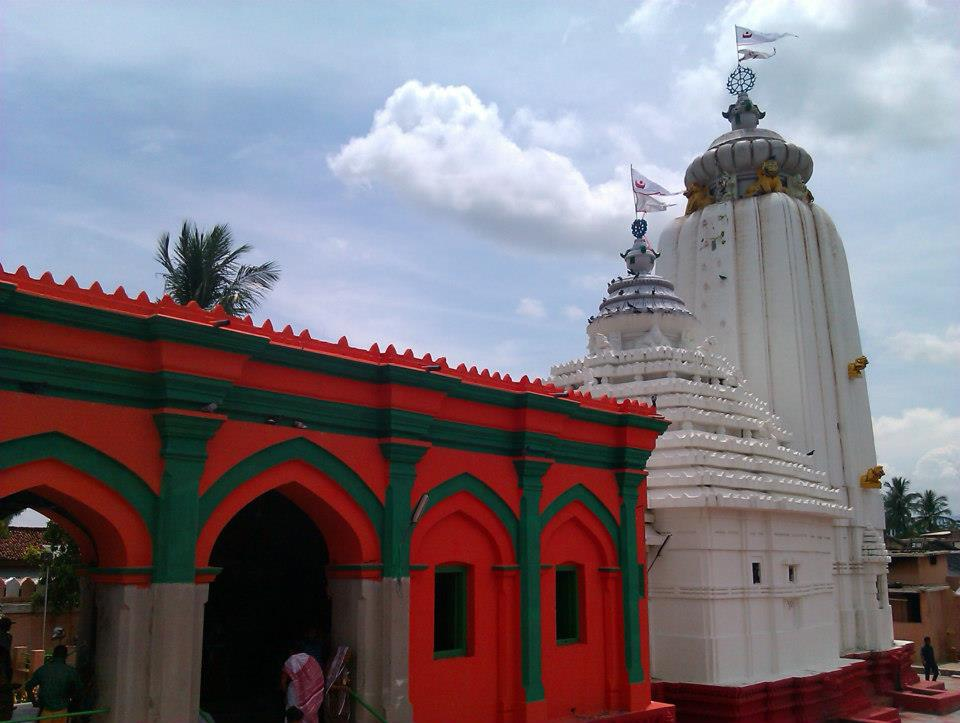
Shri Hari Baladev Jiu Temple in Baripada, built under royal patronage.

Mayurbhanj State (Odia: ମୟୂରଭଞ୍ଜ ରାଜ୍ୟ; colloquially Morbhanj) was one of the princely states of India during the British Raj. It was one of the largest states of the Eastern States Agency and one of the four salute states of the Orissa States Agency. The emblem of the state was two peacocks, for according to legend the ancestors of the rulers had originated from a peafowl's eyes.

The state included a vast mountainous area inhabited by many different people, such as the Santal, Munda, Ho and Kisan. Its former territory lies in the present-day state of Odisha, bordering West Bengal. The capital of the state was the town of Baripada since the 15th century. Daspur was another important town. Large tracts of Mayurbhanj state were covered with forest.

== History ==
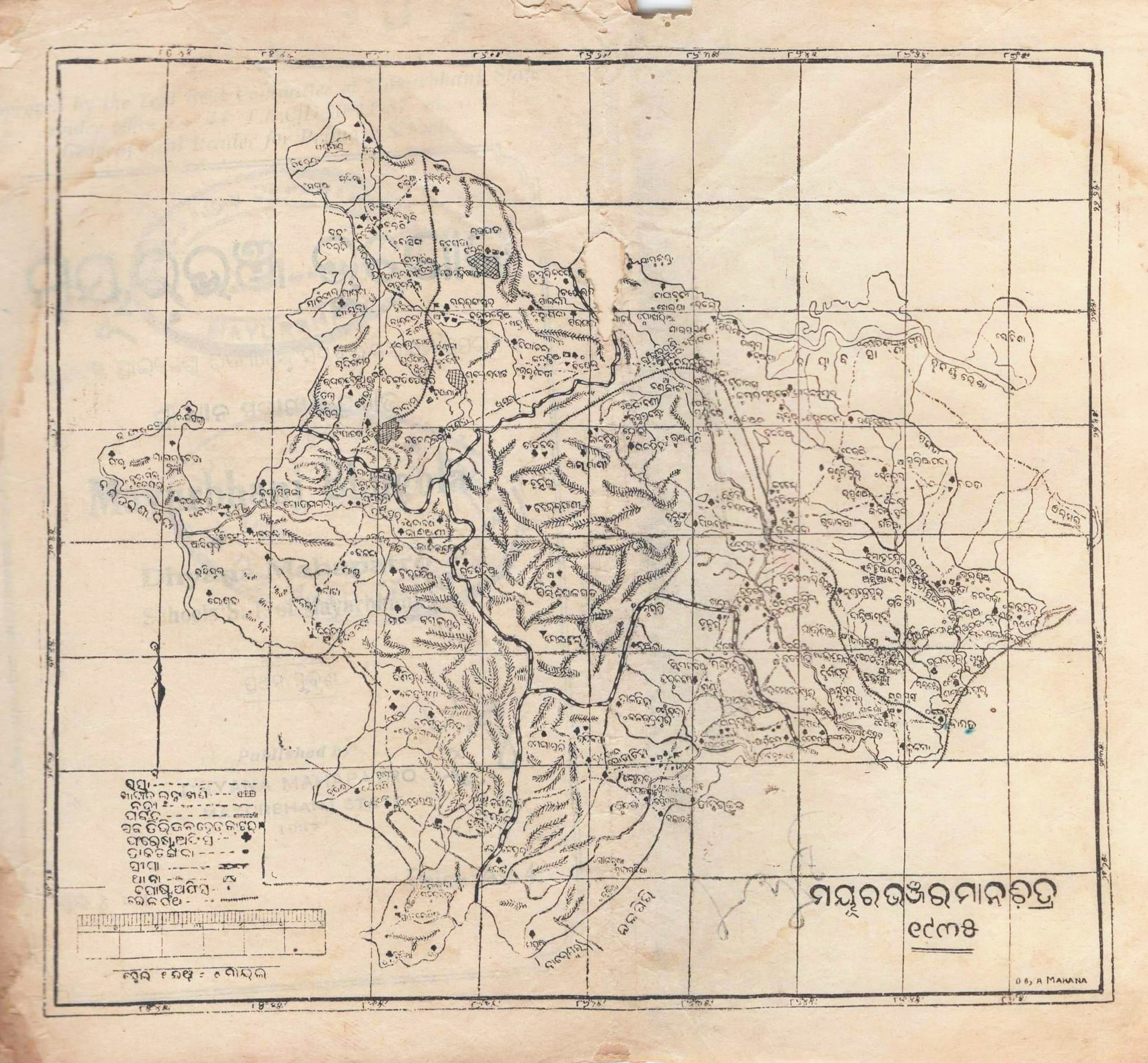
Four division of Mayurbhanj state

The rulers of Mayurbhanj state were descendants of the Bhanj dynasty of the Khijjinga mandala of the ancient local Kshatriya lineage. According to the early inscriptions of Ranabhanja and Rajabhanja, the dynasty has its origins from the mythical peahen likely pointing out to the early peafowl related traditions of the ancient Bhanja clans which is observed on their emblems which is also shared by the successive branches.

Their influence likely declined with the dominance of the Somavamshis in the Utkal region, but centuries later came back to prominence in the region with the rise of the Eastern Ganga dynasty after uniting the three realms of Trikalinga with the Bhanjas as their feudatories. Traditions point to numerous origins of the dynasty but lack of records renders them unlikely although it is generally accepted that the founder, Adi Bhanja of the 12th century established the current dynasty of the Mayurbhanj state with his brother Jyoti Bhanja founding the Keonjhar State succeeding from the Khijjinga Adi Bhanja dynasty.

Mayurbhanj State had been under Maratha rule during the 18th century and paid an annual tribute of 6000 rupees. It became a British protectorate in 1829, many years after the Third Anglo-Maratha War.

During the British Raj, the kings of Mayurbhanj pioneered the upliftment of the region. Under their enlightened rule Mayurbhanj became one of the most progressive areas. The Bhanj dynasty's kings established the first medical college of the state in Cuttack, donating funds and land for the establishment of higher education institutions such as Ravenshaw College and welfare schemes, such as the one undertaken by the Evangelical Missionary Society of Mayurbhanj (EMSM), established in 1895 at the instance of Maharaja Shree Rama Chandra Bhanja Deo. Mayurbhanj Palace was built by Maharani Sumitra Devi Bhanja Deo in 1804.

The Mayurbhanj State Railway was started by the erstwhile ruler of Mayurbhanj Maharaja Shree Rama Chandra Bhanja Deo. The first section of 52 km from Rupsa to Baripada railway station being opened for traffic on 20 January 1905.

After the independence of India, Mayurbhanj State under Maharaja Pratap Chandra Bhanja Deo acceded to the Dominion of India on 1 January 1949, and was merged with Orissa Province, which became later the state of Odisha.

=== Rulers ===
The rulers of Mayurbhanj State of the Bhanja dynasty were entitled to a 9 gun salute. The state's rulers were:

1. Succession from the Khijjinga mandala Bhanjas (8th–10th cen)
2. Adi Bhanja of Mayurbhanj
3. Santai Bhanja
4. Chakkai Bhanja
5. Lakshmana Bhanja
6. Kalpi Bhanja
7. Surjya Bhanja
8. Ramachandra Bhanja
9. Batuli Bhanja
10. Iswanath Bhanja
11. Jagannath Bhanja
12. Nilakantha Bhanja
13. Baidyanath Bhanjadeba (1556–1600)
14. Jagannath Bhanjadeba (1600-1643)
15. Harihara Bhanjadeba (1643–1668)
16. Sarvesvara Bhanjdeba (1688–1711)
17. Viravikramaditya Bhanjadeba (1711–1728)
18. Raghunath Bhanjadeba (1728–1750)
19. Chakradhar Bhanjadeba (1750–1761)
20. Damodar Bhanjadeba (1761–1796)
21. Rani Sumitra Devi (f) - Regent of Mayurbhanj (1796–1810)
22. Rani Jamuna Devi (f) - Regent of Mayurbhanj (1810-1813)
23. Tribikram Bhanja Deo (1813–1822)
24. Jadunath Bhanja Deo (1822–1863) - became a British protectorate during his reign
25. Shrinath Bhanja Deo (1863–1868)
26. Krushna Chandra Bhanja Deo (1868–29 May 1882)
27. Sree Rama Chandra Bhanja Deo (29 May 1882 – 22 February 1912)
28. Purna Chandra Bhanja Deo (22 February 1912 – 21 April 1928)
29. Pratap Chandra Bhanja Deo (21 Apr 1928 – 1 January 1949)

=== Titular ===
- Pratap Chandra Bhanja Deo (1 January 1949 – 16 July 1968)
- Pradeep Chandra Bhanja Deo (16 July 1968 – 15 September 2000)
- Praveen Chandra Bhanja Deo (15 September 2000 – till date)

=== Diwans and Superintendents ===
Name	Demography	Term
Prasanna Kumar Ghoshal	Bengali	Died in 1905
Mohini Mohan Dhar	Only one Oriya Diwan	1905 - 1912 (7 years)
Hari Das Bose	Bengali	April to May 1912 (1 month)
C. L. Philip, I.C.S.	Britisher	1912 to 1916 (4 years)
J. E. Scott, ICS officer	Britisher	1916 to 1917 (1 year)
N. F. Peck, ICS officer	Britisher	1917 to 1919 (2 years)
H. Mc. Pherson, ICS officer	Britisher	1919 to 1921 (2 years)
Hari Das Basu	Bengali	1921 to 1922 (1 year)
E. Mc. Leod Smith	Britisher	1922 to 1929 (7 years)
Vacant	-	1929 to 1930
Dr. P. K. Sen, (LLB)	Bengali	1930 to 1936 (6 years)
K. C. Neogy	Britisher	1936 to 1942 (6 years)
Major B. P. Pande, (B.A. LL.B.)	Bihari	1942 to 1948 (6 years) (Last Diwan)

== Demographics ==
Historical population
Year	Pop.	±%
1872	258,680	—
1881	385,737	+49.1%
1891	532,223	+38.0%
1901	610,383	+14.7%
1911	729,218	+19.5%
1921	754,314	+3.4%
1931	889,603	+17.9%
1941	984,741	+10.7%
Source: Mayurbhanj district Gazetteer & Census of India

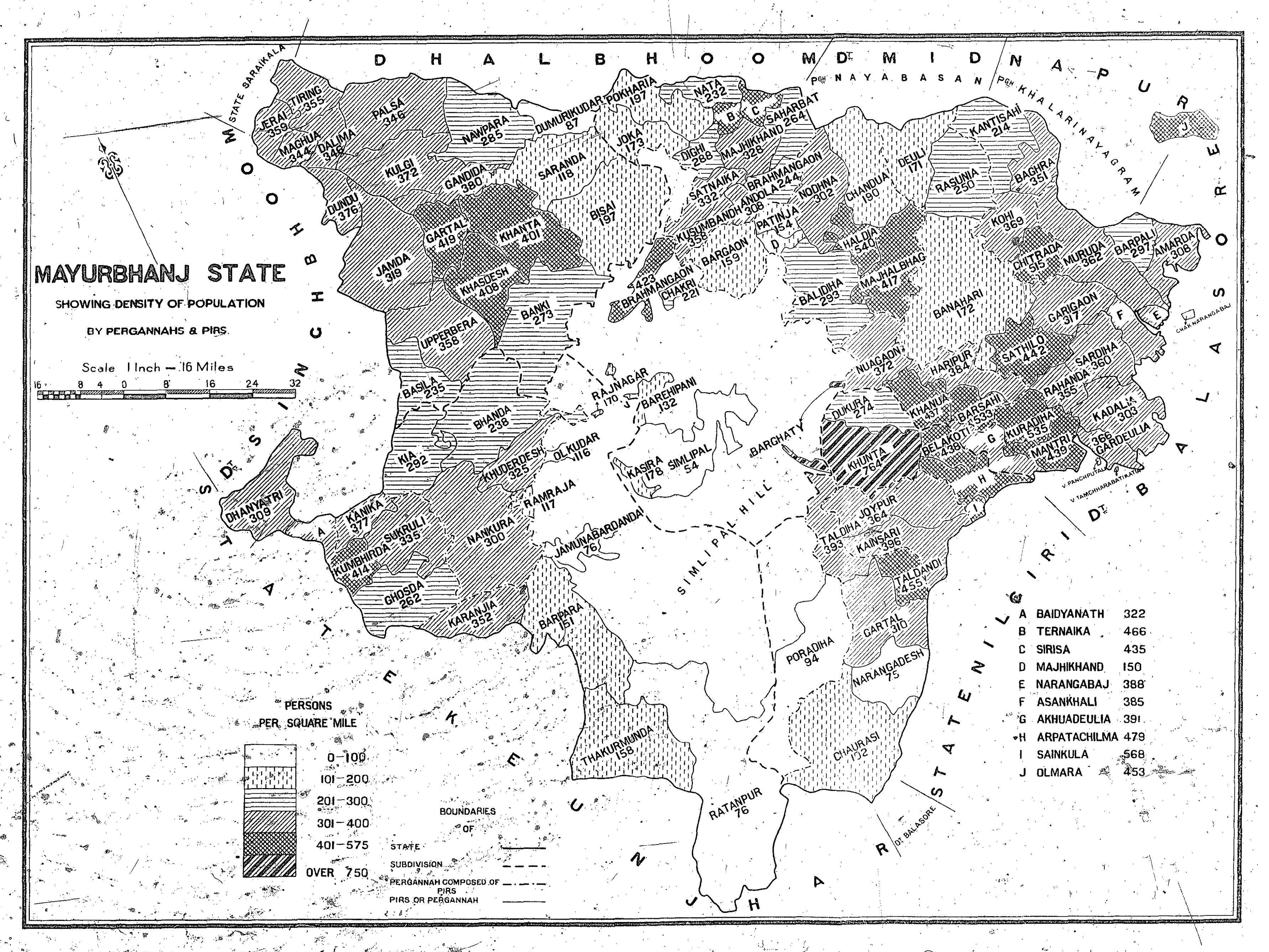
Population density map of the state, 1931

Languages of Mayurbhanj State (1931)
1. Odia (41.0%)
2. Santali (29.1%)
3. Ho (12.4%)
4. Bhumij (7.73%)
5. Bengali (4.14%)
6. Kurmali (2.94%)
7. Others (2.64%)

== See also ==
- Mayurbhanj Palace
- Mayurbhanj State Railway
- Shri Ramachandra Bhanj Medical College
- Eastern States Agency
- Political integration of India
