= Khiching =

Khiching ଖିଚିଂ
- Village
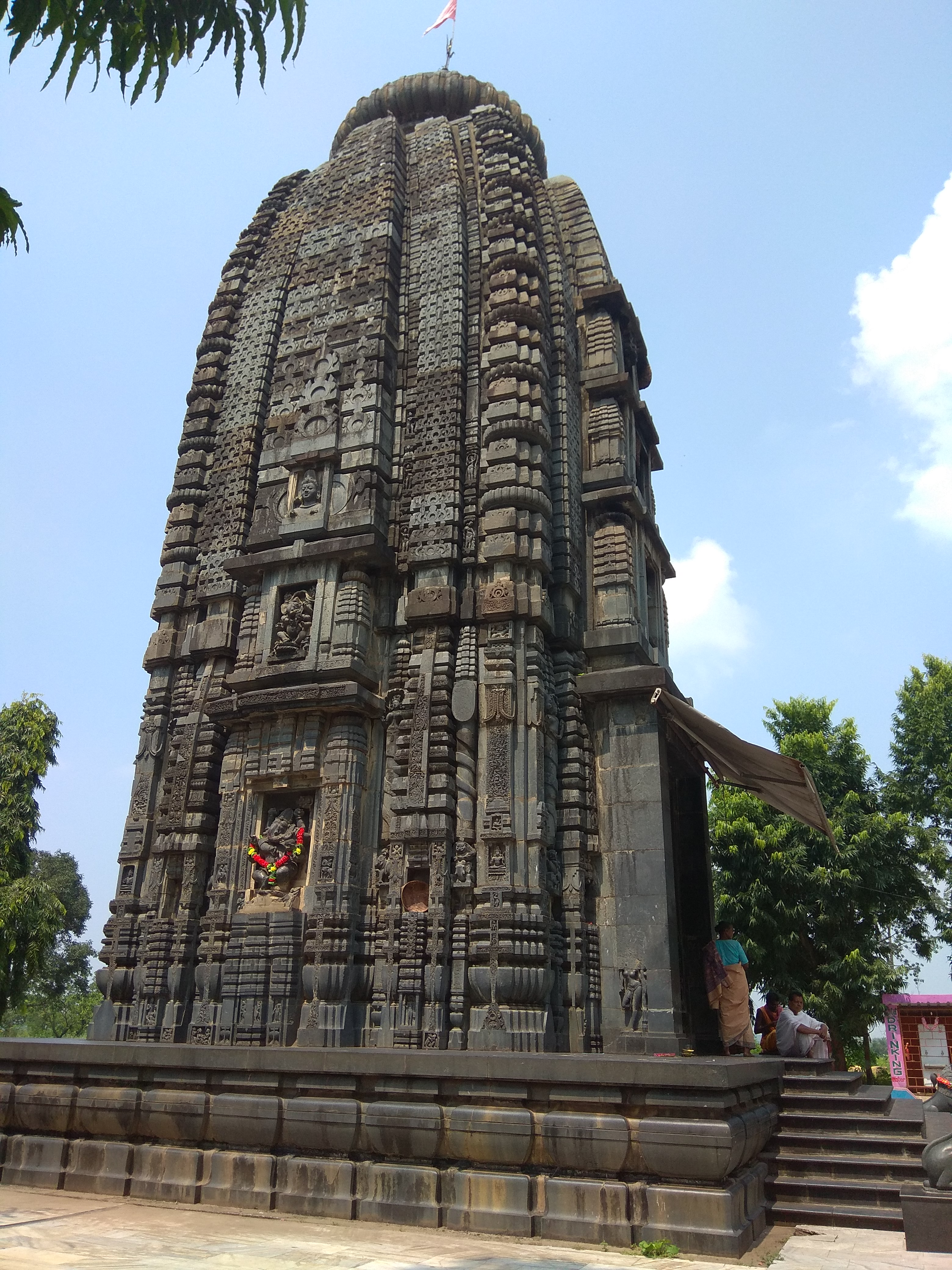
- Maa Kichakeshwari Temple

- Location in Odisha, India Khiching (India)
- Coordinates: 21°56′0″N 85°50′0″E
- Country: India
- State: Odisha
- District: Mayurbhanj

Languages
  - Official: Odia
  - Local: Santali, Ho
- Time zone: UTC+5:30 (IST)
- Postal code: 757039
- Vehicle registration: OD-11
- Website: mayurbhanj.odisha.gov.in

Khiching is an important pilgrimage village of Bhanja rulers, located in Panchpir subdivision.

Khiching is located about 50 km east of Keonjhargarh town 24 km west of Karanjia.There are several villages in the vicinity, including Sukruli, Kesana, Naupana, Kakharupana, Salabana, Viratagada, Kichakagada. Another nearby village is Singda. The major festival in Khiching is Sibaratri, which is celebrated over seven days. The major tourist attraction of Khiching is the Temple Of Maa Kichakeswari. The temple was constructed during the year 920/925. Goddess Kichakeshwari, which was not only ishtadebata and kuladebi of Bhanja dynasty but also the State deity of Princely State of Mayurbhanj ruled by them. The temple suffered in the hand of Bhandals. King of Mayurbhanj, Maharaja Pratap Chandra Bhanjdeo reconstructed the temple in the year 1934 spending an approximate amount of ₹ 85,000.00. Height of the temple is 100 ft (30 m) and total area is 1764sq.ft. Main temple remains closed between 12 noon to 3 PM. There is a museum constructed by Maharaja Purna Chandra Bhanjdeo in the year 1922.

== Description ==
The ancient capital of the Bhanja rules, Khiching lies about 190 km away from Balasore and 130 km from Baripada. Scores of temples dominate the place, some of which are still in active worship. The predominant deity of Khiching is Kichakeswari, the most sacred Goddess of the Mayurbhanj chiefs. The temple dedicated to her is built entirely of chlorite slabs and unique of it kind in India. The sculptures are beautiful.a museum here boasts of highly important historical specimens of sculpture and art.
