= Bhanja dynasty =

Ancient dynasty originated in the Utkala Kingdom

The Bhanja dynasty (ଭଞ୍ଜ ରାଜ ବଂଶ)is a dynasty that originated in the northern and central regions of modern Odisha (in the Khiching region of Utkala and Khinjali mandalas) before the Gupta Empire became an imperial power. The dynasty, of ancient local Kshatriya lineage as documented by Hermann Kulke, succeeded the Vindhyatabi branch of the Nagas of Padmavati, who ruled from the Keonjhar district of Odisha and included Satrubhanja of the Asanpat inscription. The Bhanj later became feudatories of the Bhauma-Kara dynasty.

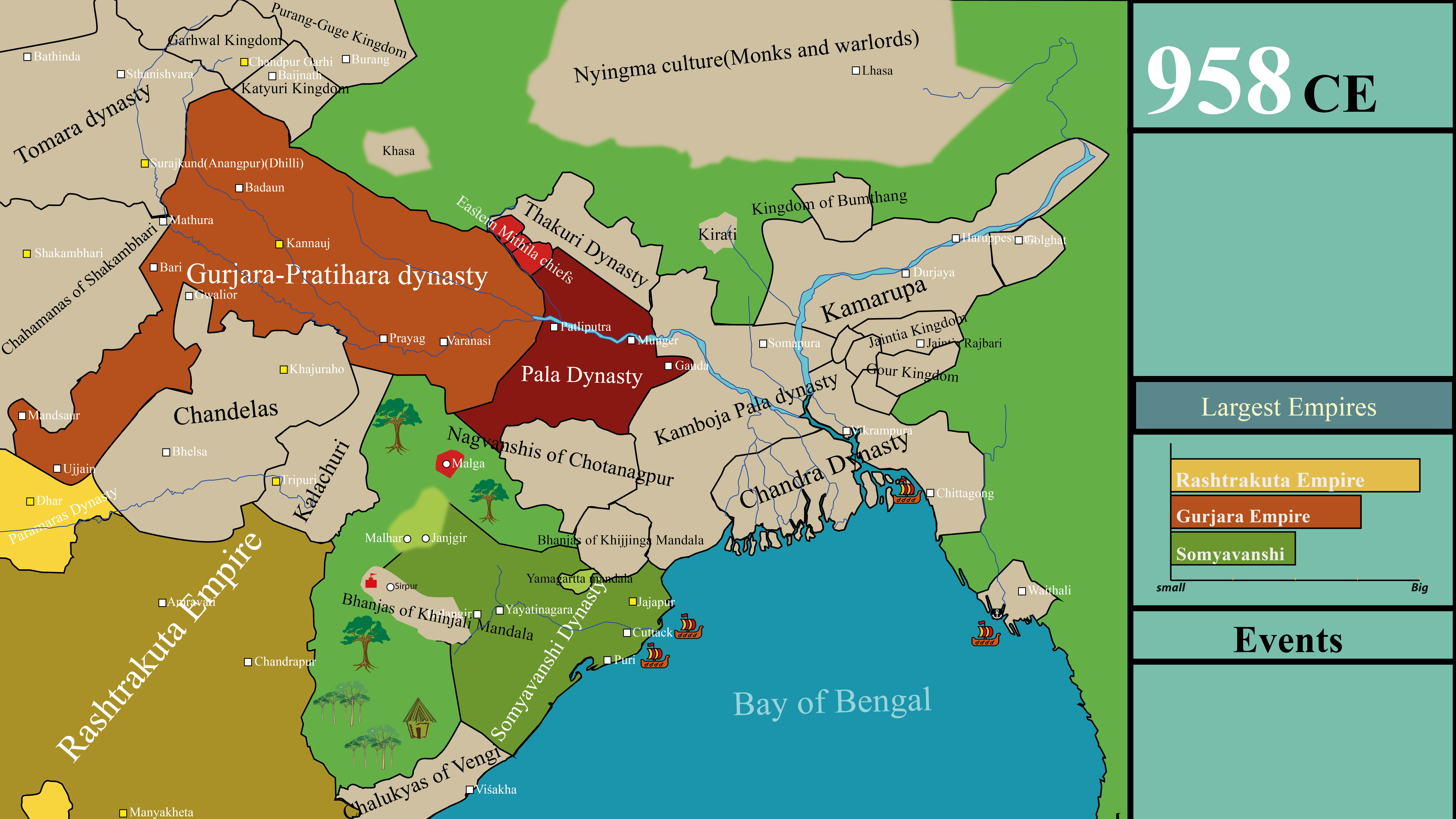
Bhanja dynasty in 958 CE

The successor branches of the Bhanja rulers became local feudatories to the united realms of the Eastern Ganga dynasty, the Gajapati Empire, and ruling dynasties of the princely states and zamindaries of the region with the advent of British rule. Prominent branches include the princely states of Mayurbhanj State and Keonjhar State.

== History ==
The early Bhanjas emerged as leading chieftains succeeding the Nagas of the Vindhyatabi rulers in Kendujhar and the Western Odisha region, inheriting the land that consisted of the preceding Naga ruler Satrubhanja's domains. With the supremacy of Bhauma-Kara dynasty rule in the Utkal region, they ruled as their feudatories which consisted of mandalas.

According to early mandala inscriptions, the Bhanjas describe their origins from the mythical peahen, likely pointing out to the early peafowl-related traditions of the ancient Bhanja clans, which is observed on their emblems that are shared by the successive branches. Khinjali and Khijjinga mandalas were among the prominent mandalas under Bhauma-Kara rule.

=== Khinjali mandala ===
The Khinjili mandala comprised the areas of modern-day Boudh, Phulbani, Nayagarh, Ghumusar, and Sonepur. Its capital was Dhritipura (modern Boudh). Nettabhanja, who ruled over the Dhenkanal-Anugul region and made Nava-angulakapatana his capital, was regarded by R. D. Banerji and R. C. Majumdar as the earliest Bhanja king of the Khinjali mandala line. The early Bhanjas were powerful feudatory rulers of independent sovereign principalities in early medieval Odisha, and the territory was passed to the Somavanshis after Ranabhanja, then his son Netribhanja established a new territory named after Khinjali. Copper plate inscriptions of Yasobhanja and his brother Jayabhanja at Antirigam and Kanakabhanja show Bhanja rule continued in the Khijali region until the 12th century CE.

During the early 10th century CE, with political instabilities in the Bhauma-Kara kingdom, the neighboring Somavamshi and Bhanja dynasties attempted to conquer the region. The Bhanjas of Khinjali married two of their princesses (Vakula Mahadevi and Dharma Mahadevi) to the Bhauma-Kara kings Shubhakaradeva V and his father Shantikaradeva III, and later controlled the Bhauma-Kara kingdom through them. The Bhauma-Kara territory eventually came under the control of the dominant Somavamshis.

==== Early Bhanjas of Khinjali mandala ====
- Silabhanja I (8th-century CE)
- Satrubhanja (8th-century CE)
- Ranabhanja (9th-century CE)
- Netribhanja I (Nettabhanja I)
- Digbhanja
- Silabhanja II
- Vidyadharbhanja
- Nettabhanja II

==== Baudh Bhanjas of Khinjali mandala ====
- Solana Bhanja
- Durjaya Bhanja
- Kanaka Bhanja

==== Later Bhanjas of Khinjali mandala ====
- Devabhaja
- Rayabhanja I
- Virabhanja
- Rayabhanja II
- Yasobhanja (12th cen CE)
- Jayabhanja (12th cen CE)
- Virabhanja II

=== Khijjinga mandala ===
Khijjinga, or Khijjinga-Kotta, comprised areas of modern-day Mayurbhanj and Kendujhar. Inscriptions refer to them as the founders of the Adi-Bhanja dynasty. The early history of Bhanja rule at Khijjinga is described in copper plate inscriptions found at Bamanghaty near Rairangpur and the Khandadeuli inscription of Ranabhanja. The founder of the dynasty was Virabahdra Adi Bhanja, with his capital located at Khijjinga Kota (now Khiching). The Kichakeshwari Temple was also built by Rajabanja, according to inscriptions.

- Virabhadra Adi-Bhanja (eighth-century CE)
- Kottabhanja
- Digbhanja
- Rajabanja
- Ranabhanja (924 CE Bamanghaty inscription)
- Narendrabhanja

=== Bhaumakara kingdom ===
Two princesses of the Khinjali Bhanjas, Vakula Mahadevi and Dharma Mahadevi, married the Bhauma-Kara kings Shubhakaradeva V and his father Shantikaradeva III, and later became the regnal monarchs of the Bhauma-Kara kingdom.

- Vakula Mahadevi (934–940)
- Dharma Mahadevi (940–943)

== Bhanja successor states ==
- Ancient Bhanja clans
  - Khijjinga mandala
    - Mayurbhanj branch
      - Kanika branch
      - Bastar branch
      - Garh Haladia branch
    - Keonjhar branch
  - Khinjali mandala
    - Baudh branch
      - Daspalla branch
    - Ghumusar branch

=== Mayurbhanj branch ===
The influence of the Khijjinga Bhanjas declined after the dominance of the Somavamshis in the Utkal region, but centuries later came back to prominence in the region with the rise of the Eastern Ganga dynasty after uniting the three realms of Trikalinga with the Bhanjas as their feudatories. Traditions point to numerous origins of the dynasty, but a lack of records renders them unlikely although it is generally accepted that the founder, Adi Bhanja of the 8th century CE established the dynasty of the Mayurbhanj state with his brother Jyoti Bhanja founding the Keonjhar State succeeding from the Khijjinga Adi Bhanja dynasty.

=== Kanika branch ===
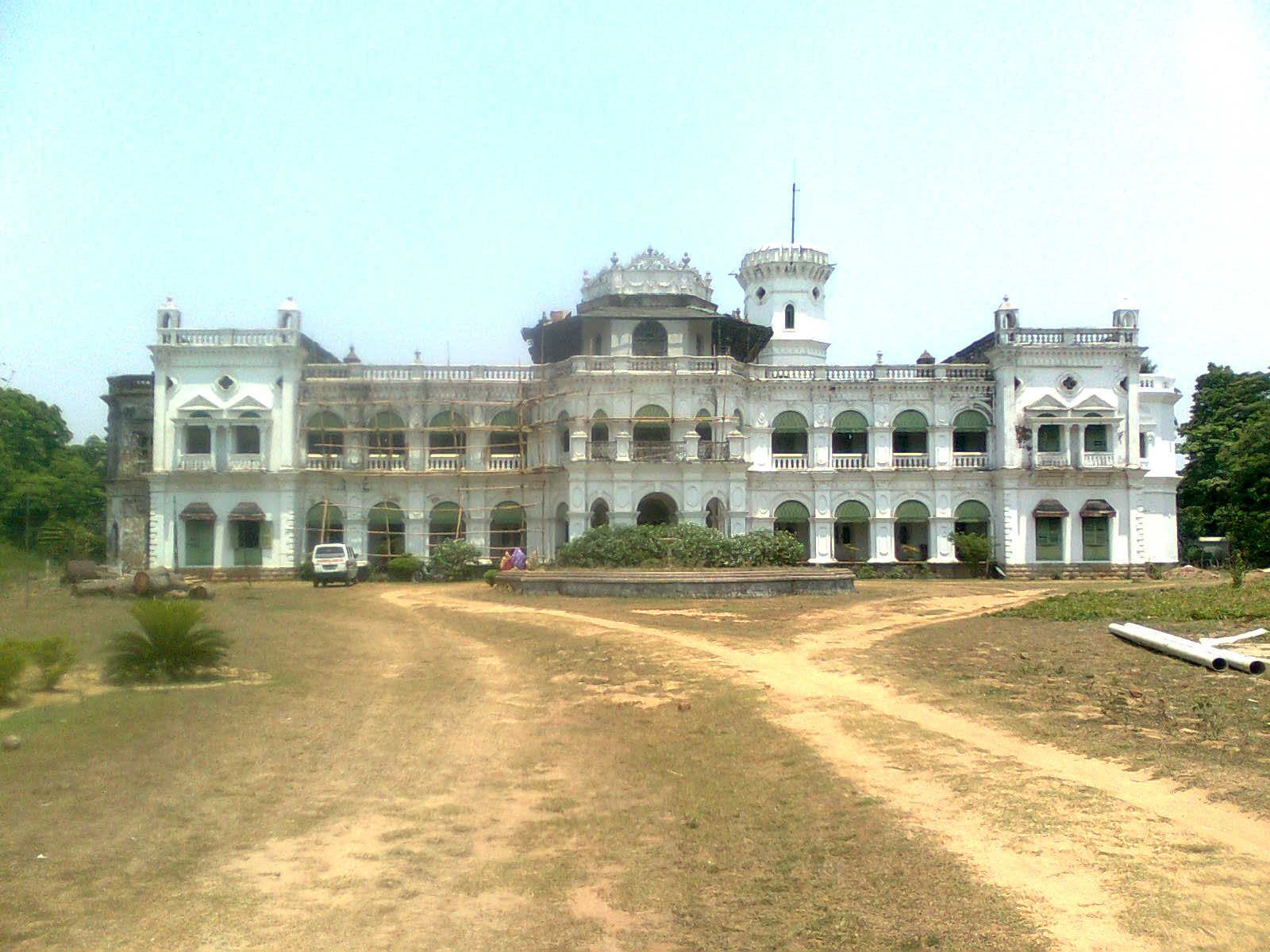
Kanika palace

The Kanika Bhanja branch was established by Bhujabal Bhanja most likely around the third century. It remained a prominent zamindari during the reigns of the Trikalingapati and Gajapati monarchs and also supported the Khurda rulers against the British after they took over Orissa from the Maratha Empire in 1803. After independence in 1947, it was merged into Odisha, following which the zamindari estates were abolished.

=== Bastar branch ===
The Bastar state was long ruled by the descendants of the Kakatiya Raj Gond dynasty until the 1920s, when Maharaja Rudra Pratap Deo's daughter and heir Rani Prafulla Kumari Devi married Kumar Prafulla Chandra Bhanj Deo, who was the nephew of the King of Mayurbhanj Sriram Chandra Bhanj Deo. Their son Pravir Chandra Bhanj Deo became the first and only Bhanja ruler of Bastar from 1936 until 1948 when it acceded to India following independence.

=== Garh Haladia branch ===
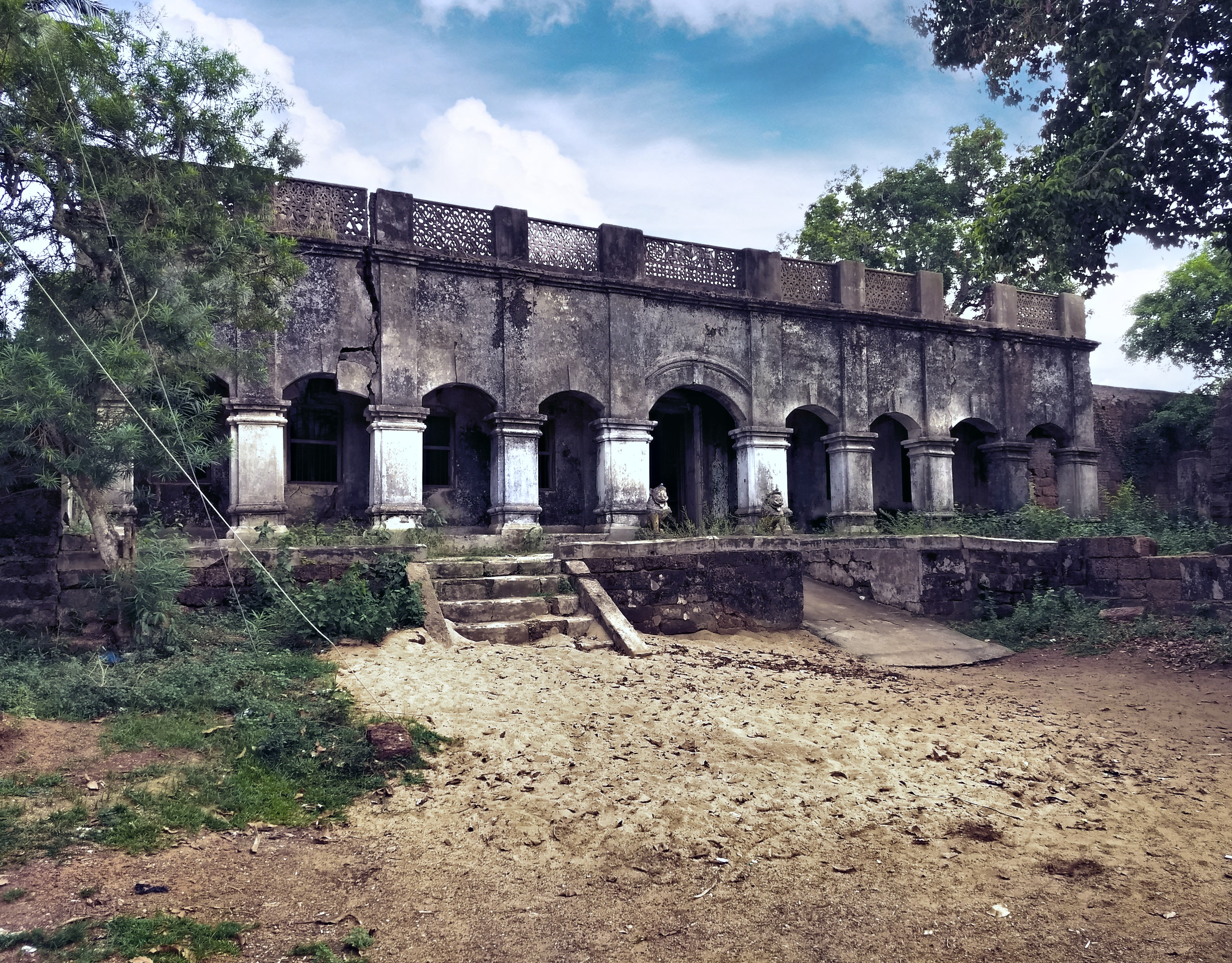
Palace of Garh Haladia

The Haladia estate was an ancient vassal state of the Gajapati Empire that was ruled on their behalf by the Bhanj monarchs. They are a branch of Mayurbhanj State who swore allegiance to the Gajapati Maharaja of Puri. It was founded by Anu Bhanj Deo, a scion of the Mayurbhanj Raj family who came to Puri around the 11th century CE, married the daughter of the then-Gajapati Maharaja of Puri, and obtained the estate as her dowry. During British rule, Garh Haladia was one of the Khandayat jagirs in Khordha.

=== Keonjhar branch ===
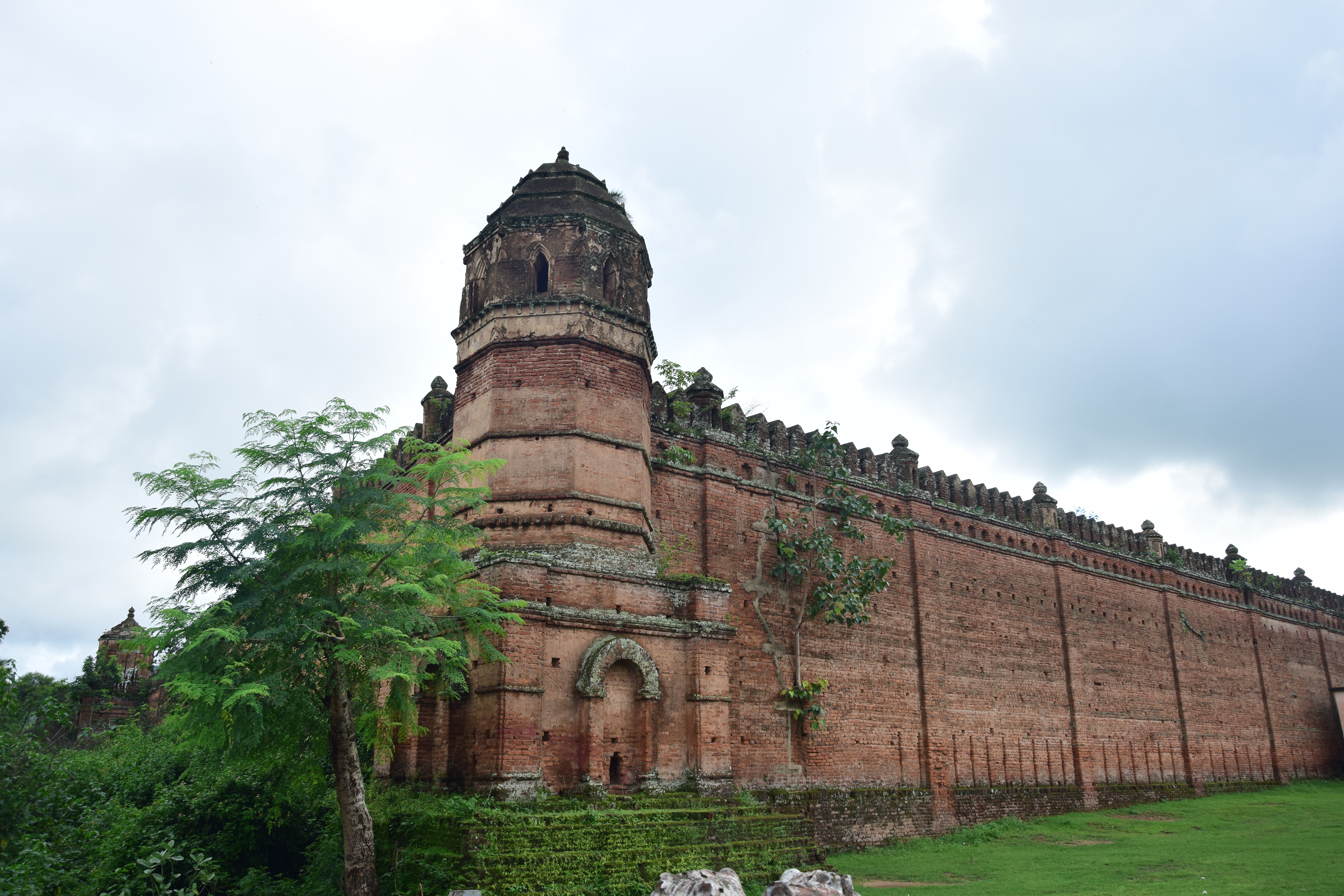
Kendujhargarh Fort

According to traditions, Keonjhar State was founded sometime during the 12th century during the rule of the Eastern Ganga dynasty when Jyoti Bhanj was enthroned as the raja of Keonjhar with the help of dominant local Bhuyan clans. The influence of Bhuyans on the enthronement rituals and regnal traditions of Keonjhar suggests a long-standing relationship with the kingdom.

=== Baudh branch ===
With the advent of Eastern Ganga rule over the region after the defeat of the Somavamshis, there were local chieftains ruling over Baudh as Eastern Ganga feudatories. There was a Brahmin chieftain who was childless that adopted the nephew of the neighboring raja of Keonjhar who belonged to the Bhanj dynasty. The prince named himself Ananga Deva and became the king of Baudh in the 14th century.

=== Daspalla branch ===
In the late 15th century around 1498 CE, Naren Bhanja, the brother of the raja of Baudh, was made chieftain of the Daspalla region, from which he later seceded and declared his independent kingdom.

=== Ghumusar branch ===
The rulers of Ghumusar zamindari were descendants of the Bhanja rulers of Khinjali mandala whose rule ended in the Boudh region as the Somavanshis conquered their territory during their conflicts with the Bhauma-Kara rulers during the 10th century CE and were displaced into the Ghumusar region post-12th century where they set up their kingdom. They established their capital at Kulad (a place near Bhanjanagar). Ghumusar Bhanja rulers significantly contributed to the development of Odia literature during the Riti Yuga/Bhanja Yuga phase like Balabhadra Bhanja, Tribikram Bhanja, Dhanajaya Bhanja, Ghana Bhanja and Kabi Samrat Upendra Bhanja. The Ghumusar branch ended during the rule of Dhananjaya Bhanja II in 1835, when the British annexed the Ghumusar region after suppressing the Ghumusar rebellion of 1835–36.

== Gallery ==
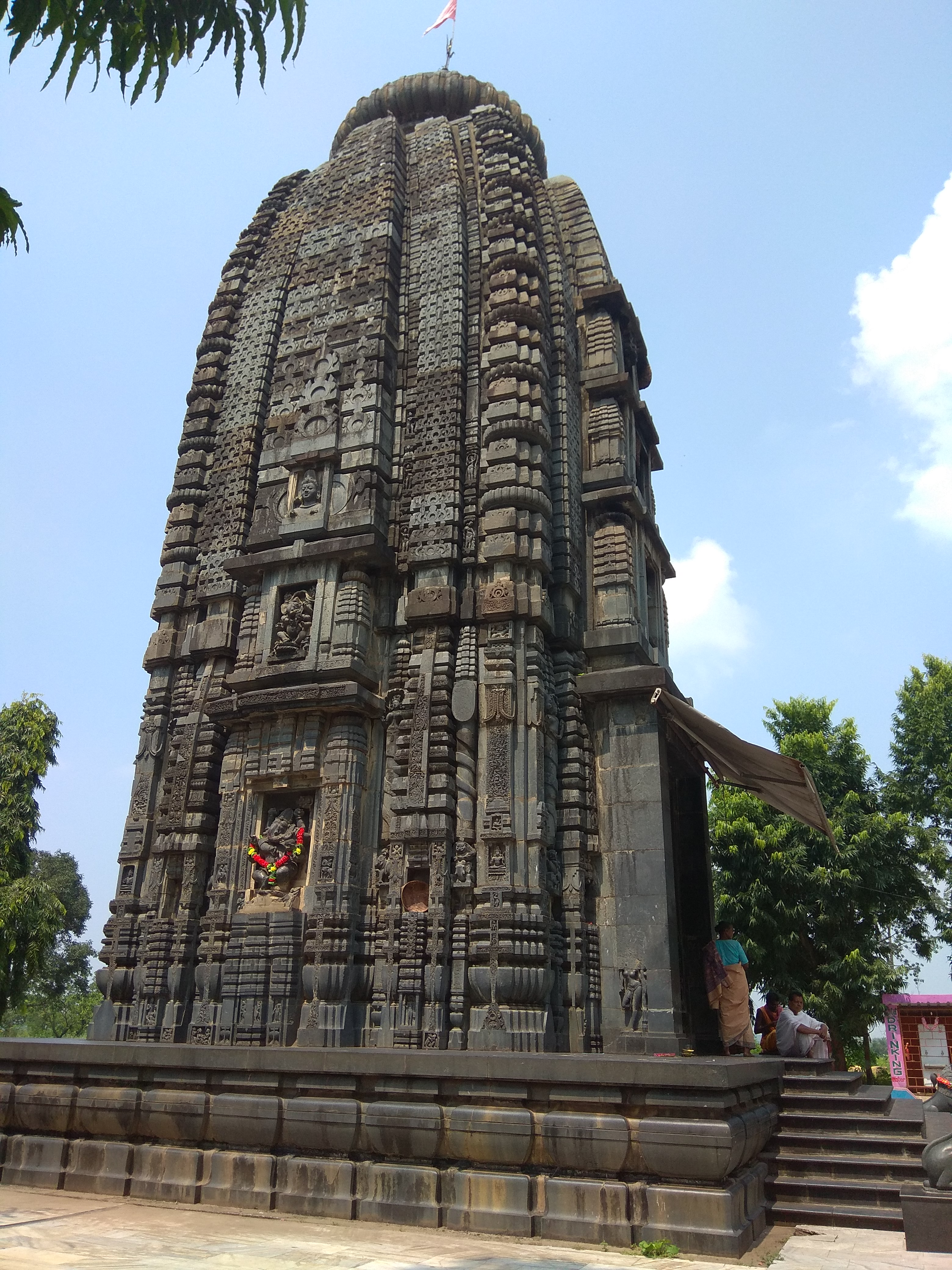
Kichakeshwari Temple at Khiching

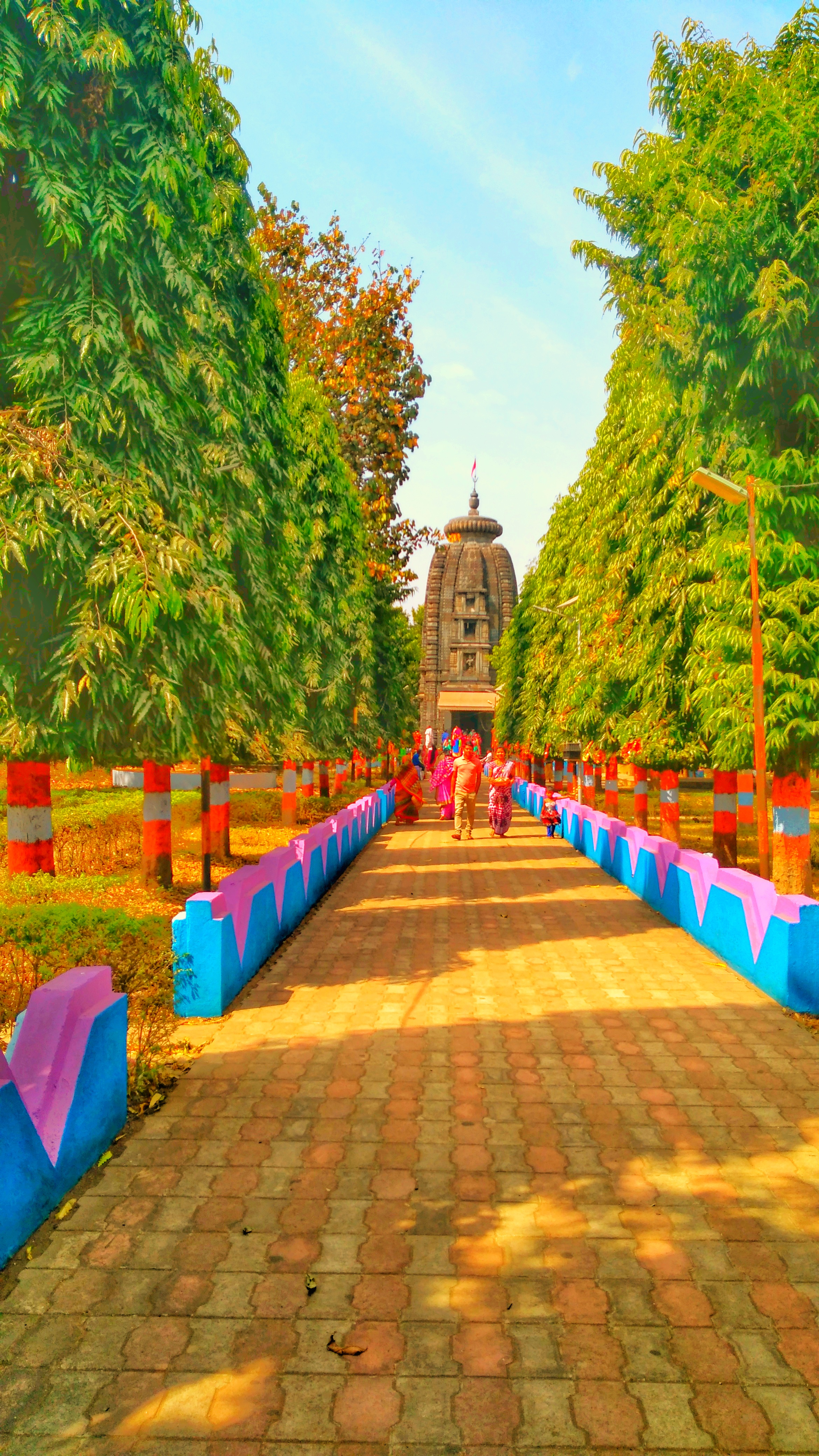
File:Kechakeshari temple, Khiching

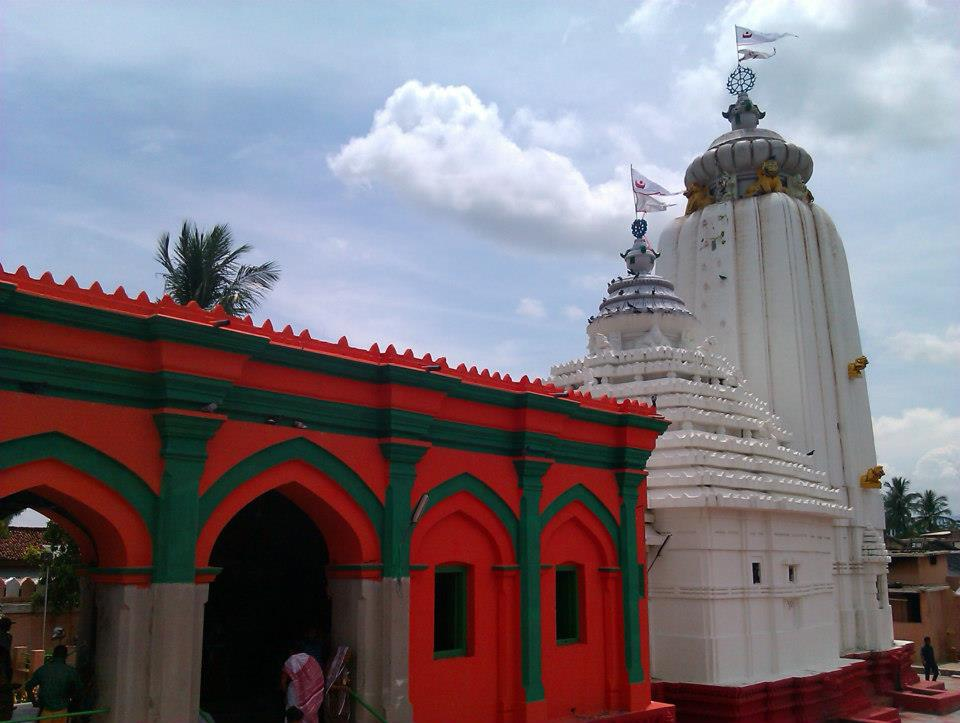
Shri Hari Baladev Jiu Temple, Baripada

== See also ==
- List of rulers of Odisha
