= Udala =

- Town
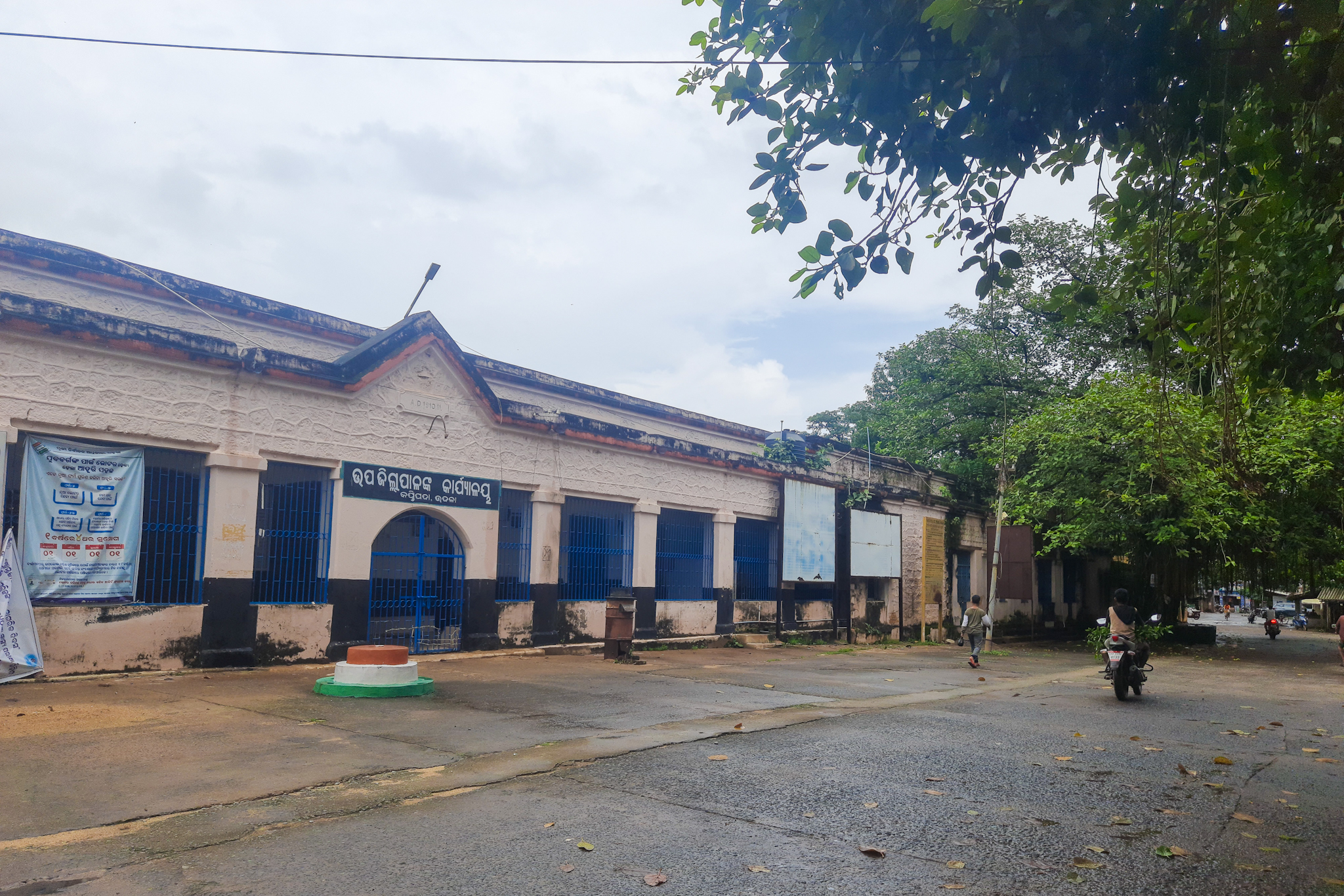
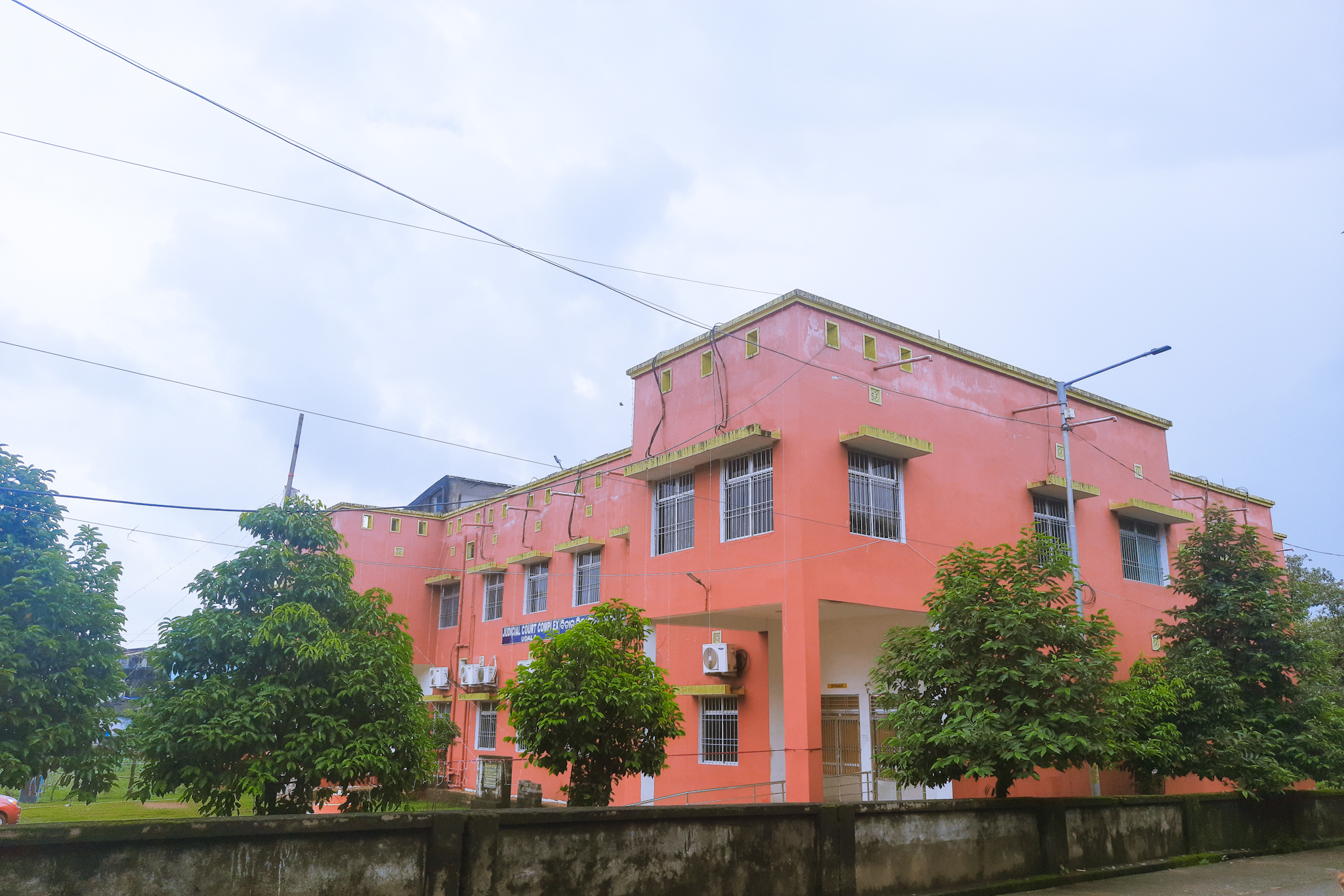
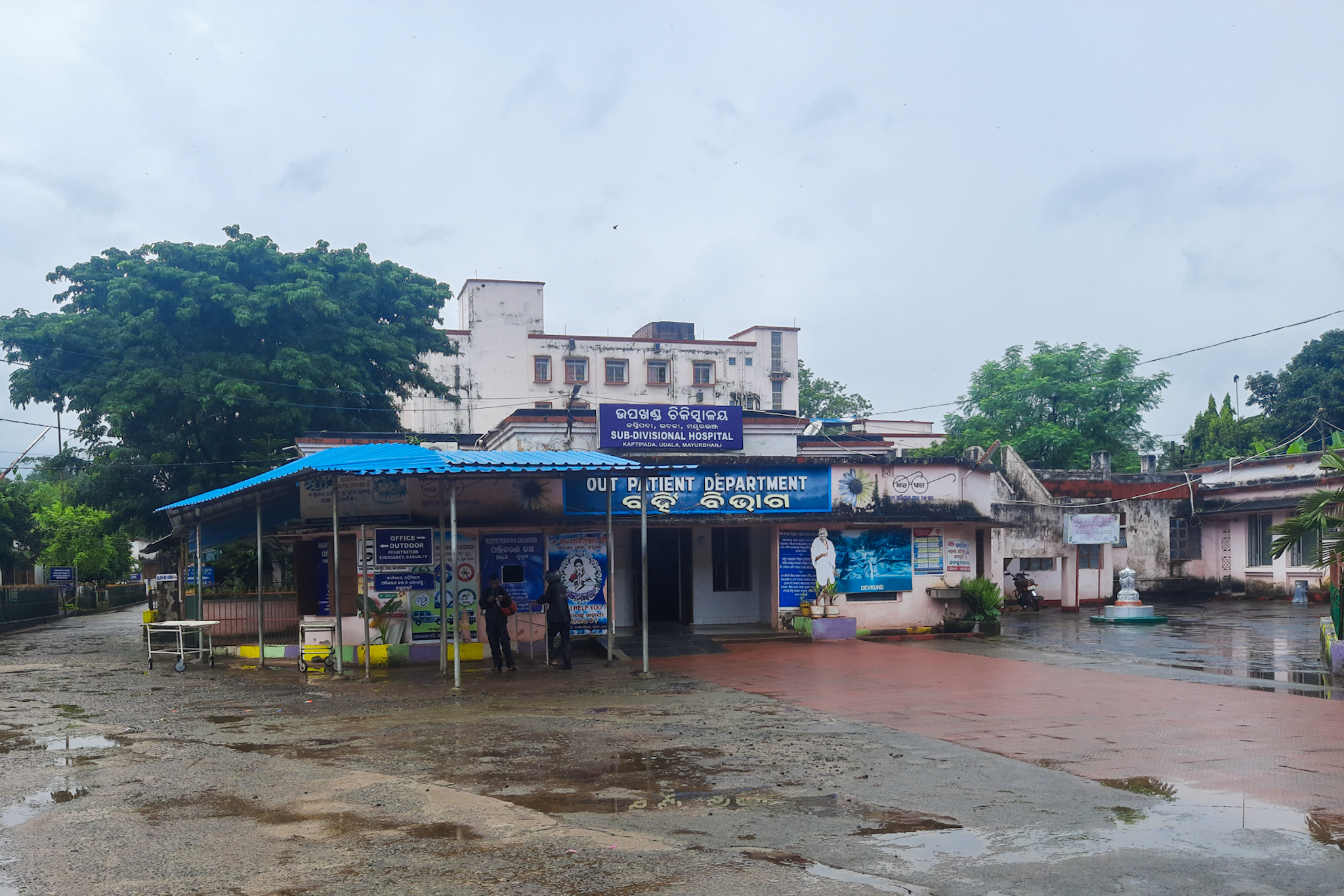
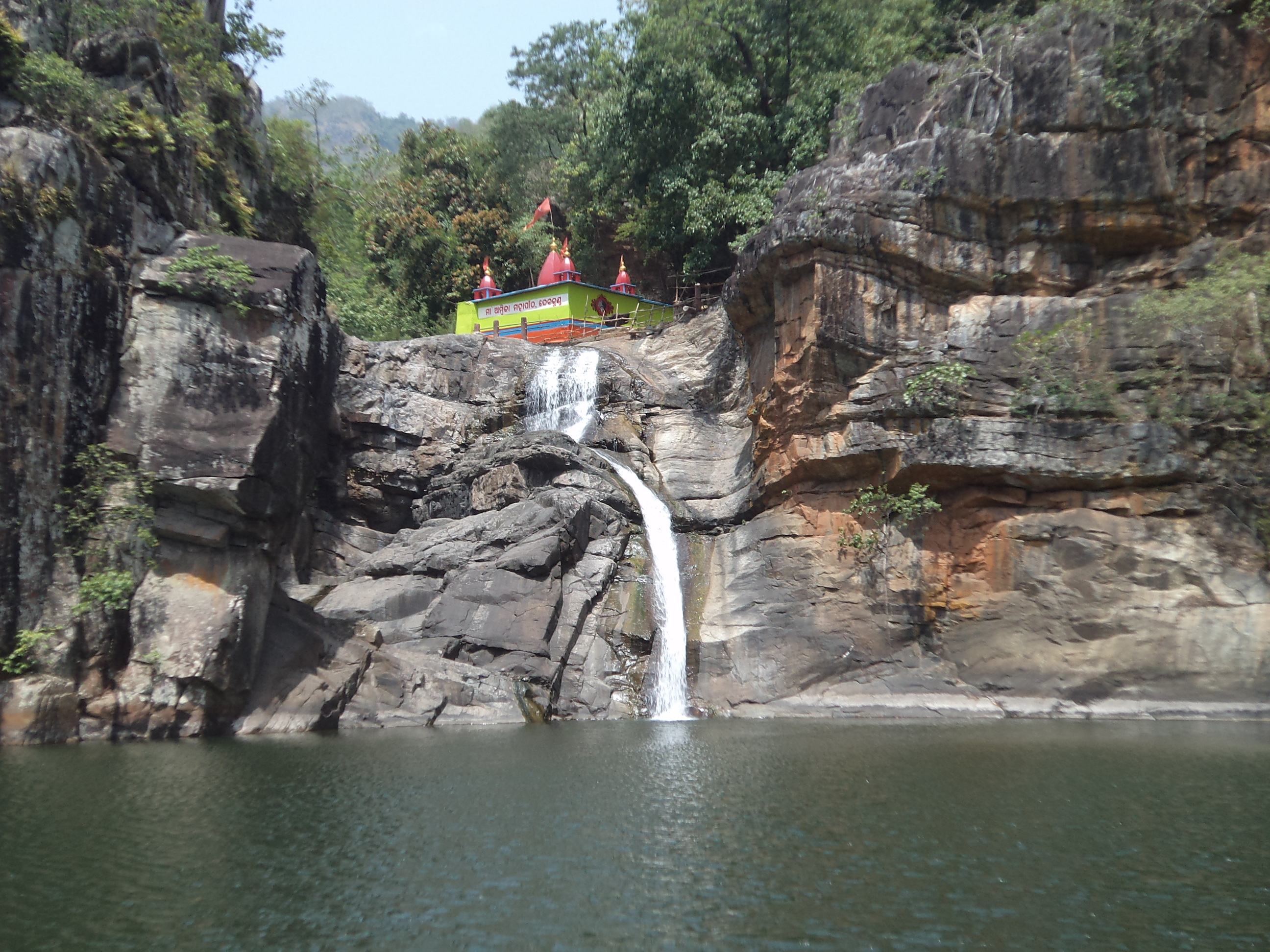
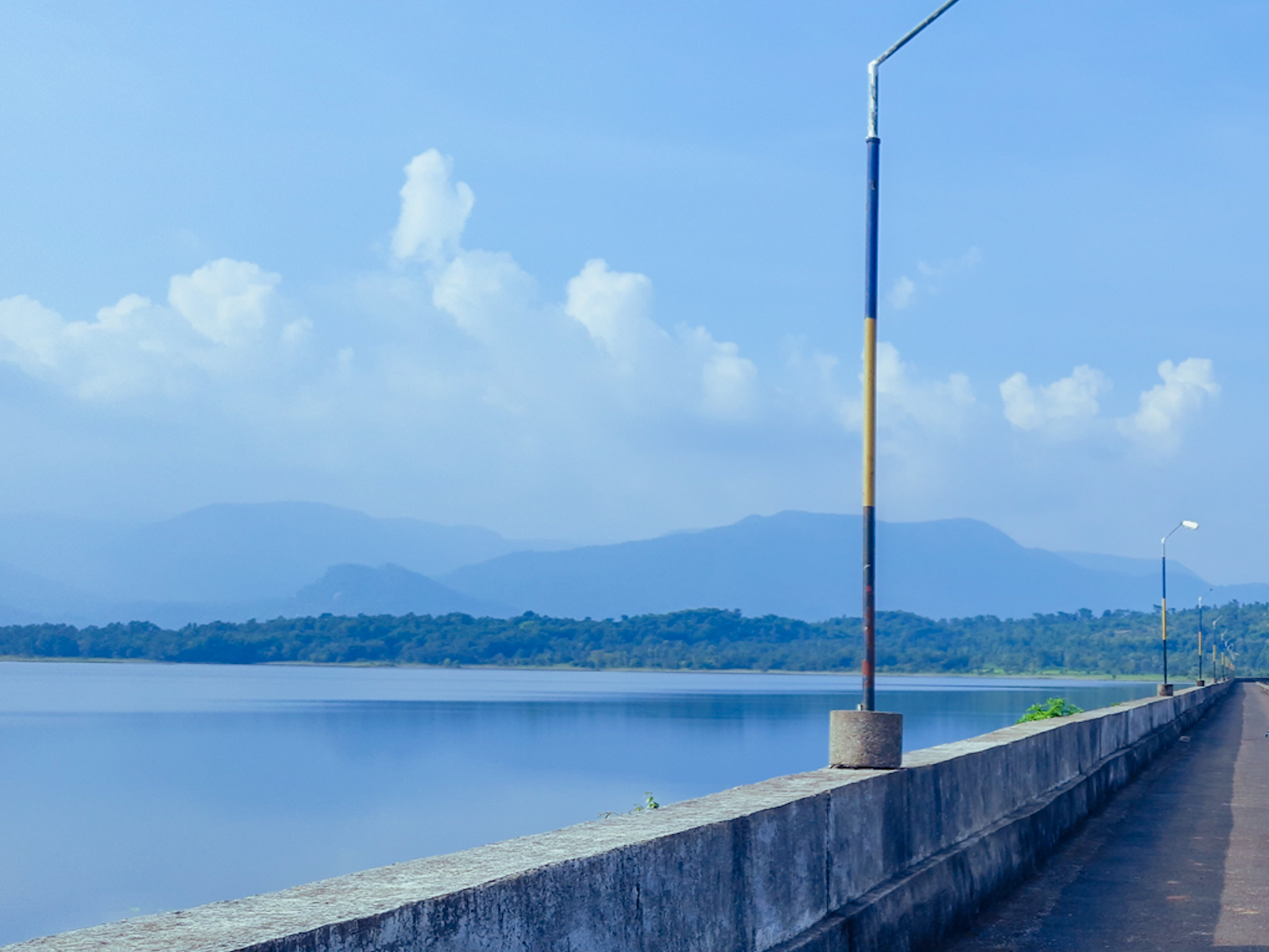
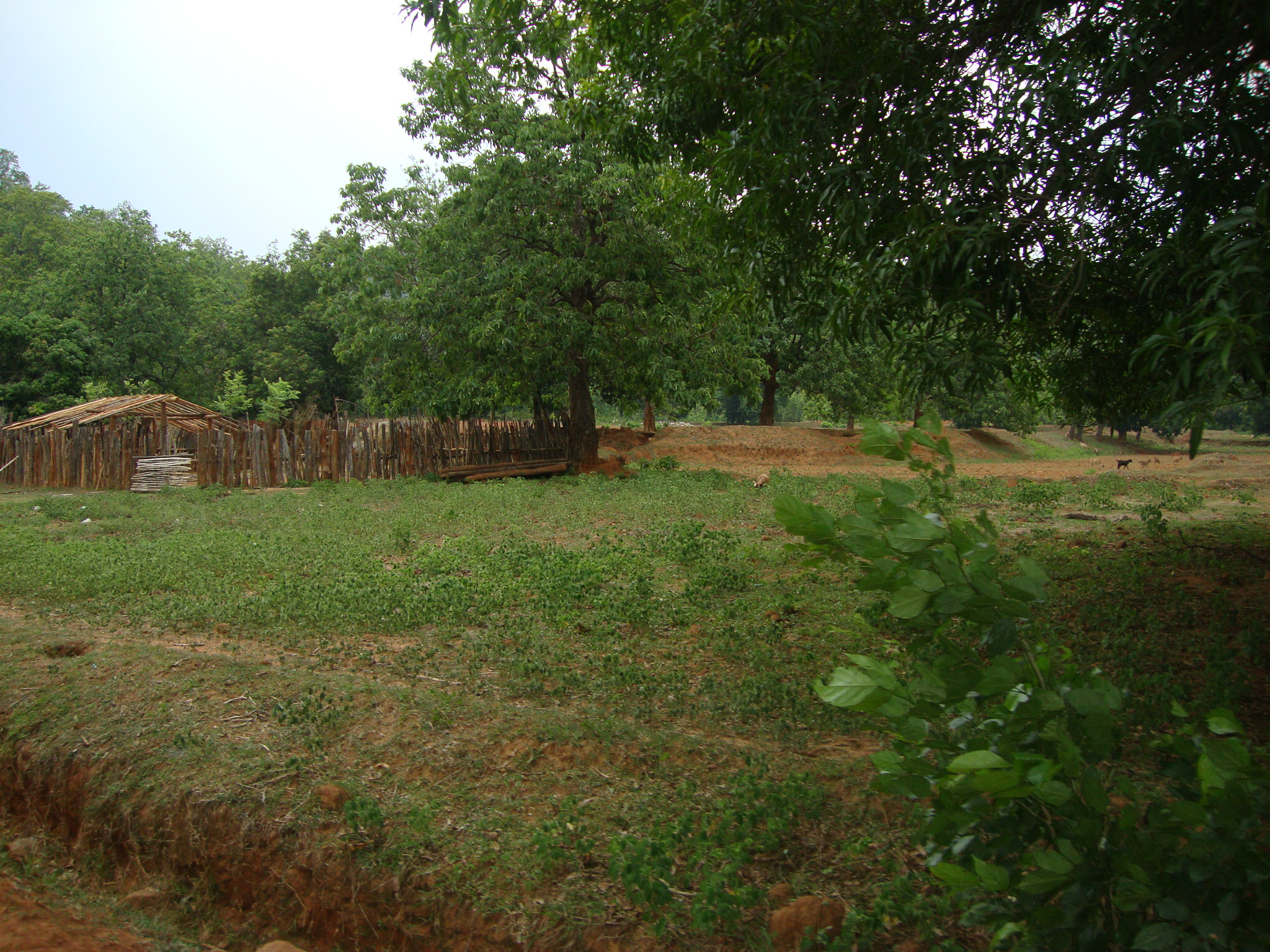
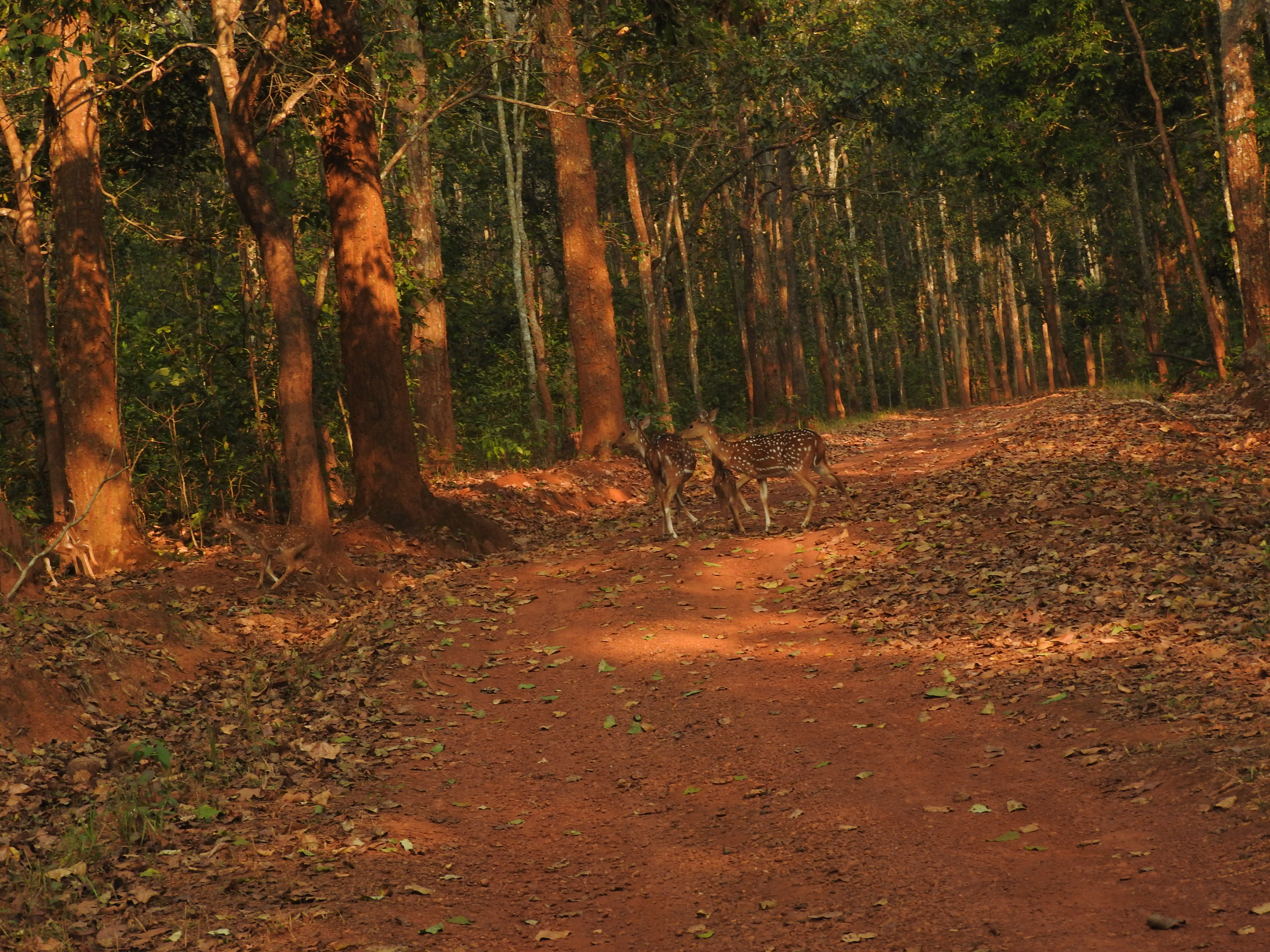
- Clockwise from Top: Sub-divisional head office, Sub-divisional Judicial Office, Sub-divisional Medical, Devkund waterfall, Kalo Dam

- Location in Odisha, India Udala (India)
- Coordinates: 21.57°N 86.57°E
- Country: India
- State: Odisha
- District: Mayurbhanj
- Established (as a town): 1950 (76 years ago)
- Named for: Uddalaka

Government
  - Type: NAC
  - Chairperson: Pramila Panda (BJP)
  - Executive officer: Bidyadhar Dandapat

Area
  - Total: 7.89 km^{2} (3.05 sq mi)
- Elevation: 57 m (187 ft)

Population (2011)
  - Total: 13,152
  - Density: 1,670/km^{2} (4,320/sq mi)

Language
  - Official: Odia, English
- Time zone: UTC+5:30 (IST)
- PIN: 757041
- Vehicle registration: OD 11x-xxxx (formerly OR 11x-xxxx)
- Website: www.udalanac.in

Udala (colloquially Udla) is a town and headquarter of Kaptipada subdivision of Mayurbhanj district, Odisha. It is also a NAC of Mayurbhanj district.

== Etymology ==
The name 'Udala' is believed to have been derived from the sage Uddalaka, whose adherents used to practice religious asceticism adjacent to the Sono river.

== History ==
Udala was historically a small village within the Taldandi pir of Kaptipada estate. The estate merged with Mayurbhanj State in 1890, and its management was taken over by the state in 1898. Subsequently, the estate, along with four adjoining parganas of the Sadar subdivision, was reorganized into a subdivision in 1908. The administrative headquarters relocated from Kaptipada to Udala, the approximate center of the sub-divisional area in 1910, and in 1918, the new circular road connecting Udala to the state headquarters, Baripada, was constructed. Later, when the princely state merged with Odisha in 1949 following India's independence, Udala was informally designated as a town in 1950. In 1961, the region had a population of 3,022, comprising the town (de facto a village) Udala (1,261) and its surrounding villages: Mendhakhai (749), Jagannathi (561), Nagbani (266), Jantrida (140), and Jirida (45). With population growth over the years, the town declared as Notified Area Council (NAC) for self-governance in 1973, covering an area of 7.89 square kilometers by composing those six villages and organized into 12 wards.

== Geography ==
Udala is located at 21.57°N 86.57°E. It has an average elevation of 57 metres (187 feet). The place is situated about 45 km from Baripada the district headquarters of Mayurbhanj. This is situated near the great waterfalls of Similipal.

== Demographics ==
Historical population
Year	Pop.	±%
1961	3,022	—
1971	4,507	+49.1%
1981	7,136	+58.3%
1991	11,289	+58.2%
2001	11,712	+3.7%
2011	13,152	+12.3%
Note: Udala, as a census town, was enumerated after the establishment of the NAC in 1973. Prior to that, the population figures represent the sum of six villages that later formed the NAC town. Source: Census of India

As of 2011 Census of India, Udala Notified Area Council (NAC) is the smallest town in terms of population and area within the Mayurbhanj district, with a total population of 13,152 and an area of 7.89 square kilometers. The population density is 1667 people per square kilometer, and the gender ratio is 963 females for every 1,000 males. The population comprises 7.49% Scheduled Castes and 25.11% Scheduled Tribes, while the remaining 67.4%, belongs to other communities. The literacy rate is 87.79%, with a modest gender gap in literacy of 8.8%. The workforce participation rate stands at 37.86%, with 77.81% as main workers and 22.19% as marginal workers.

=== Religions ===
Religions in Udala town (2011)
Religion	Percent
Hinduism	96.1%
Islam	3.19%
Christianity	0.14%
Other or not stated	0.58%

=== Languages ===
Languages spoken in Udala (2011)
1. Odia (80.2%)
2. Santali (13.3%)
3. Hindi (2.55%)
4. Urdu (1.29%)
5. Bengali (1.15%)
6. Mundari (0.91%)
7. Other (0.55%)

== Media ==
Udala town utilizes both print and digital media to disseminate state or country updates, while the tribal-dominated rural areas of Kaptipada subdivision rely on Radio Baghajatin Station, a community radio in Udala, for local news and cultural discussions. The radio station plays a significant role in these remote regions, complemented by broader information from the All India Radio Station based in Baripada, the district headquarters.

== Places of interest ==
Devkund: Devkund is a scenic spot, found at a distance of 65 km from Baripada and 110 km from Balasore. This place is a tourist attraction, owing to its waterfalls and natural environment. Perched on a hill, Maa Ambika Temple is a shrine of Devkund.

Samibrukhya: Samibrukhya is a single vertical stone which is also a major tourist attraction. The size of the vertical stone is around 500ft. It is the place where Pandavas kept their weapons during their exile according to Mahabharata. A big festival is organised during Makara Sankranti.

Jhinkeswar Temple: Jhinkeswar temple is an abode of Lord Shiva. It is a place for the Udbhaba Linga (where the linga has appeared from the ground), so the sanctum of the temple is below the ground level. There is a small pond attached to the temple and an old and deep well located in the premise of the temple. Jhinkeswar Shiva temple was built by Sadashiva Kar many years ago. Every year on Shivaratri the Jagara Yatra is conducted in the village jhinkpada. Merchants from far away places gather here to sell their commodities. This Yatra is conducted for about 15 days.

Mouda Temple: Mouda temple is a Shiva temple located on the top of the Mouda hill located near Radho. Every year on Shivaratri the hill is decorated with lights and offerings are made to Lord Shiva by the people.

Tarini Temple: This Tarini temple is located atop a small hilltop in Udala.

Kalo and Sunei: These are irrigation project dams and located in Kaptipada. These are popular places for picnicking and boating. Currently boating facilities available only in Kalo dam.

== Politics ==
Udala Town is part of the Udala Assembly Constituency and the Mayurbhanj Parliament Constituency in Odisha. The current member of the legislative assembly (MLA) from Udala Assembly Constituency is Bhaskar Madhei of BJP. He won election in 2004 and 2000. The previous MLA from this seat was Srinath Soren of BJD, who won the seat in state elections in 2014. Rabaneswar Madhei who won this seat represented INC in 1995 and 1985 and represented INC(I) in 1980, Rohidas Soren of JD in 1990, and Birbhadra Singh of JNP in 1977.

== Notable people ==
- Papu Pom Pom, an Odia actor and standup comedian
