= Udala Assembly constituency =

Constituency of the Odisha legislative assembly in India

Coordinates: 21.58°N 86.57°E

Udala
- Constituency No. 31 for the Odisha Legislative Assembly

Constituency details
- Country: India
- Region: East India
- State: Odisha
- Division: Central Division
- District: Mayurbhanj
- Lok Sabha constituency: Mayurbhanj
- Established: 1957
- Total electors: 2,03,084 (Note: as on 2024) (Note: as data published by election commission)
- Reservation: ST

Member of Legislative Assembly
- 17th Odisha Legislative Assembly
- Incumbent Bhaskar Madhei
- Party: BJP
- Elected year: 2024

Udala (Sl. No.: 31) is a Vidhan Sabha constituency of Mayurbhanj district, Odisha.

Area of this constituency includes Udala town, Udala block, Gopabandhu Nagar block and 19 GPs (Badabisol, Badagudgudia, Badkhaladi, Chakradharpur, Devala, Jadida, Jambani, Jayantipatta, Samil, Jamudiha, Jhinkpada, Kaptipada, Koliolam, Majhigadia, Manakadpada, Nuddiha, Pedagadi, Pingu and Salchua) of Kaptipada block.

== Elected members ==
Vote share of winning candidates
2024	42.00%
2019	45.00%
2014	37.00%
2009	35.53%
2004	32.33%
2000	53.42%
1995	30.18%
1990	46.68%
1985	45.91%
1980	56.80%
1977	47.17%
1974	61.80%
1971	37.26%
1967	43.78%
1961	46.89%
1957	33.63%

15 elections held during 1957 to 2024. Elected members from the Udala constituency are:

Election	Portrait	Name	Party
2024		Bhaskar Madhei	Bharatiya Janata Party
2019		Bhaskar Madhei	Bharatiya Janata Party
2014		Golak Bihari Naik	Biju Janata Dal
2009		Shrinath Soren	Biju Janata Dal
2004		Bhaskar Madhei	Bharatiya Janata Party
2000		Bhaskar Madhei	Bharatiya Janata Party
1995		Rabaneswar Madhei	Indian National Congress
1990		Rohidas Soren	Janata Dal
1985		Rabaneswar Madhei	Indian National Congress
1980		Rabaneswar Madhei	Indian National Congress (I)
1977		Birabhadra Singh	Janata Party
1974		Rabaneswar Madhei	Indian National Congress
1971		Manmohan Tudu	Indian National Congress (R)
1967		Manmohan Tudu	Orissa Jana Congress
1961		Manmohan Tudu	Indian National Congress
1957		Manmohan Tudu	Indian National Congress

== Election results ==
=== 2024 ===
Voting were held on 1st June 2024 in 4th phase of Odisha Assembly Election & 7th phase of Indian General Election. Counting of votes was on 4th June 2024. In 2024 election, Bharatiya Janata Party candidate Bhaskar Madhei defeated Biju Janata Dal candidate Srinath Soren by a margin of 6,517 votes.

2024 Vidhan Sabha Election: Udala
Party	Candidate	Votes	%	±%
BJP	Bhaskar Madhei	66,401	42	
BJD	Srinath Soren	59,884	37.88	
INC	Durga Charan Tudu	15,857	10.03	
JMM	Chakradhar Sing	7,017	4.44	
NOTA	None of the above	1,443	0.91	
Majority		6,517	4.12	
Turnout		1,58,081	77.84	
BJP hold				

=== 2019 ===
In 2019 election, Bharatiya Janata Party candidate Bhaskar Madhei defeated Biju Janata Dal candidate Srinath Soren by a margin of 1,433 votes.

2019 Vidhan Sabha Election: Udala
Party	Candidate	Votes	%	±%
BJP	Bhaskar Madhei	69,725	45.48	
BJD	Srinath Soren	68,292	45.55	
INC	Benudhar Mohapatra	10,212	6.66	
NOTA	None of the above	2,271	1.48	
Majority		6,517	4.12	
Turnout		1,53,307	79.57	
BJP gain from BJD				

=== 2014 ===
In 2014 election, Biju Janata Dal candidate Golak Bihari Naik defeated Bharatiya Janata Party candidate Bhaskar Madhei by a margin of 8,529 votes.

2014 Vidhan Sabha Election: Udala
Party	Candidate	Votes	%	±%
BJD	Golak Bihari Naik	49,628	35.97	
BJP	Bhaskar Madhei	41,099	29.79	
INC	Dhukhishyam Murmu	23345	16.92	
JMM	Thumpu Murmu	15417	11.17	
None of the above	None of the above	2,041	1.48	
Majority		8,529	6.18	
Turnout		1,37,969	80.49	
BJD hold				

=== 2009 ===
In 2009 election, Biju Janata Dal candidate Shrinath Soren defeated Indian National Congress candidate Anang Charan Senapati by a margin of 11,193 votes.

2009 Vidhan Sabha Election, Udala
Party	Candidate	Votes	%	±%
BJD	Shrinath Soren	40,597	35.53	−
INC	Anang Charan Senapati	29,404	25.74	−
JMM	Dulal Soren	12,737	15.09	−
BJP	Bijay Kumar Senapati	14,472	12.67	−
Majority		11,193	9.80 (Note: % of total valid votes)	−
Turnout		1,14,381	70.33	−
BJD gain from BJP				
