= State Highway 19 (Odisha) =

Road in Odisha, India

State Highway 19

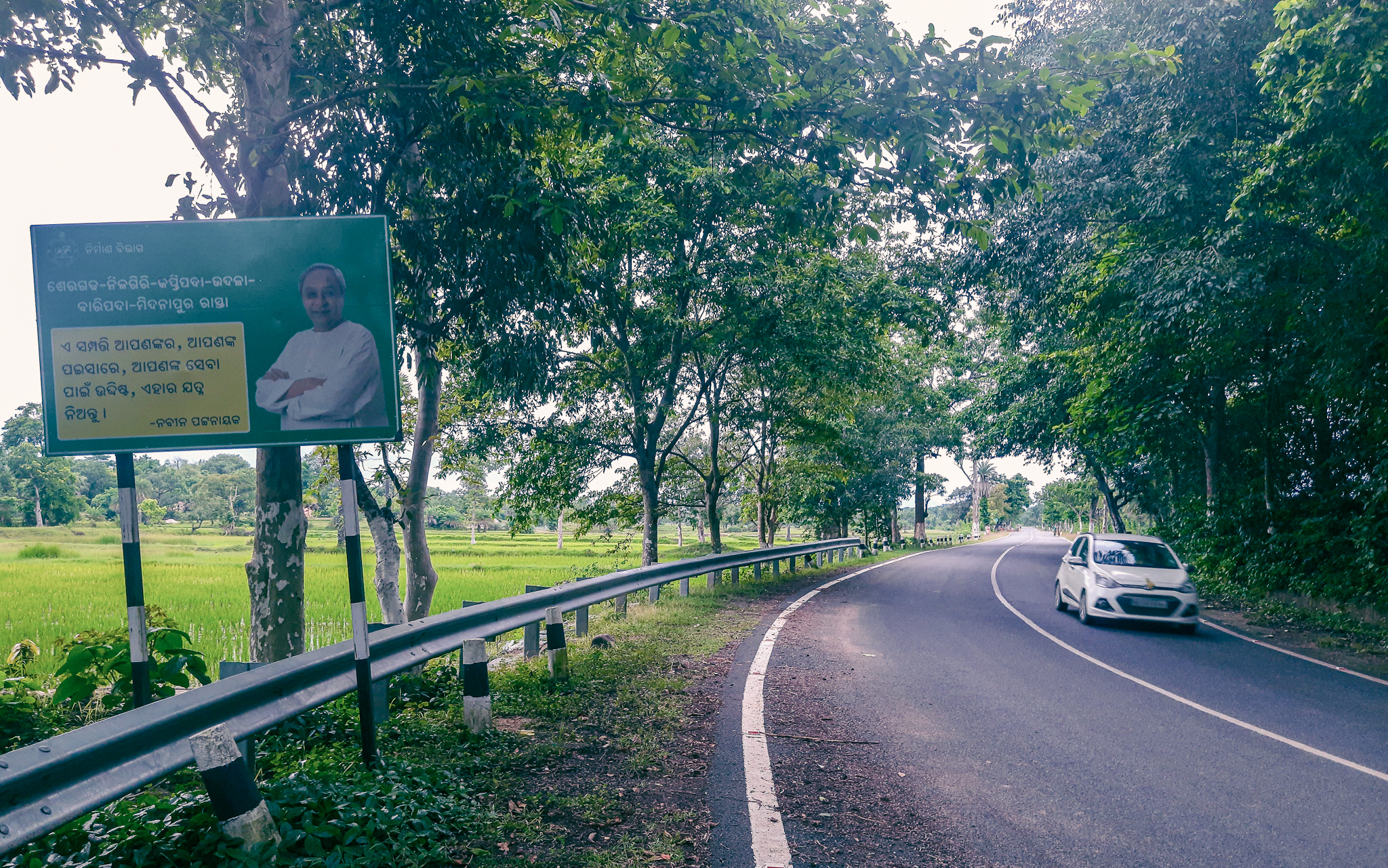

Route information
- Length: 126 km (78 mi)

Major junctions
- From: Sergarh (NH 16), Balasore
- Nilagiri, Kaptipada, Udala, Khunta, Baripada, Gopiballavpur, Sardiha
- To: Feko (NH 49), Sardiha

Location
- Country: India
- State: Odisha
- Districts: Balasore & Mayurbhanj of Odisha; Jhargram of West Bengal
- Primary destinations: Nilagiri, Udala, Baripada, Gopiballavpur, Sardiha

Highway system
- Roads in India; Expressways; National; State; Asian; State Highways in Odisha
← NH 18	→ SH 9

State Highway 19 (Odisha) is a state highway of the Indian states of Odisha & West Bengal, connecting Balasore district of Odisha to Jhargram district in West Bengal via Mayurbhanj district of Odisha through the major settlement Nilagiri, Udala, Baripada & Gopiballavpur .

== Description ==
SH 19 route in red colour

State Highway 19 of Odisha extends 126 kilometres (78 mi), starting from Sergarh (NH18) and reaching Sardiha in West Bengal. It passes through Nilgiri, Kaptipada, Udala, Khunta, the Mayurbhanj district headquarters Baripada, and finally Gopiballavpur. The route connects partially isolated settlements in the Balasore and Mayurbhanj districts of Odisha and the Jhargram district of West Bengal. The Balasore district covers 30 kilometres (19 mi) of the route, while the Mayurbhanj district covers 78 kilometres (48 mi) & West Bengal covers the rest 18 kilometres (11 mi).

== History ==
Historically, the route from Sergarh to Kaptipada and Baripada to Gopibalavpur was constructed before the 18th century. The middle section from Udala to Baripada was constructed in 1918. However, no bridges were built during that period, except for a few, such as the Naupal Iron Bridge in Mayurbhanj and the Tangana laterite stone bridge in Balasore. The bridge over the Budhabalanga River, connecting Udala and Baripada, was constructed between 1962 and 1965, measuring 782 feet (238 m) in length with a load capacity of 15 tons.

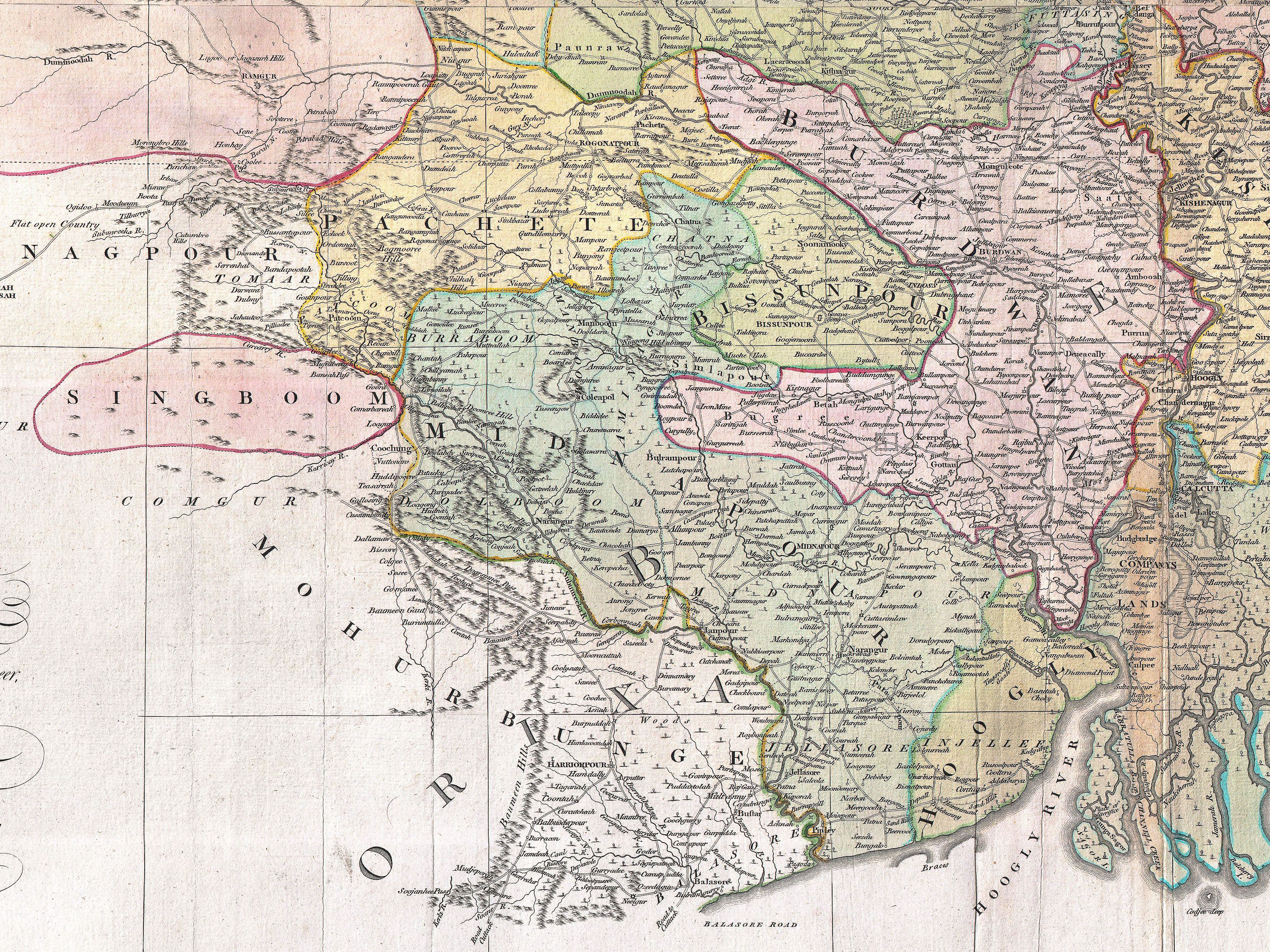
James Rennell's 1776 map showing the political boundaries and road network of lower Bengal

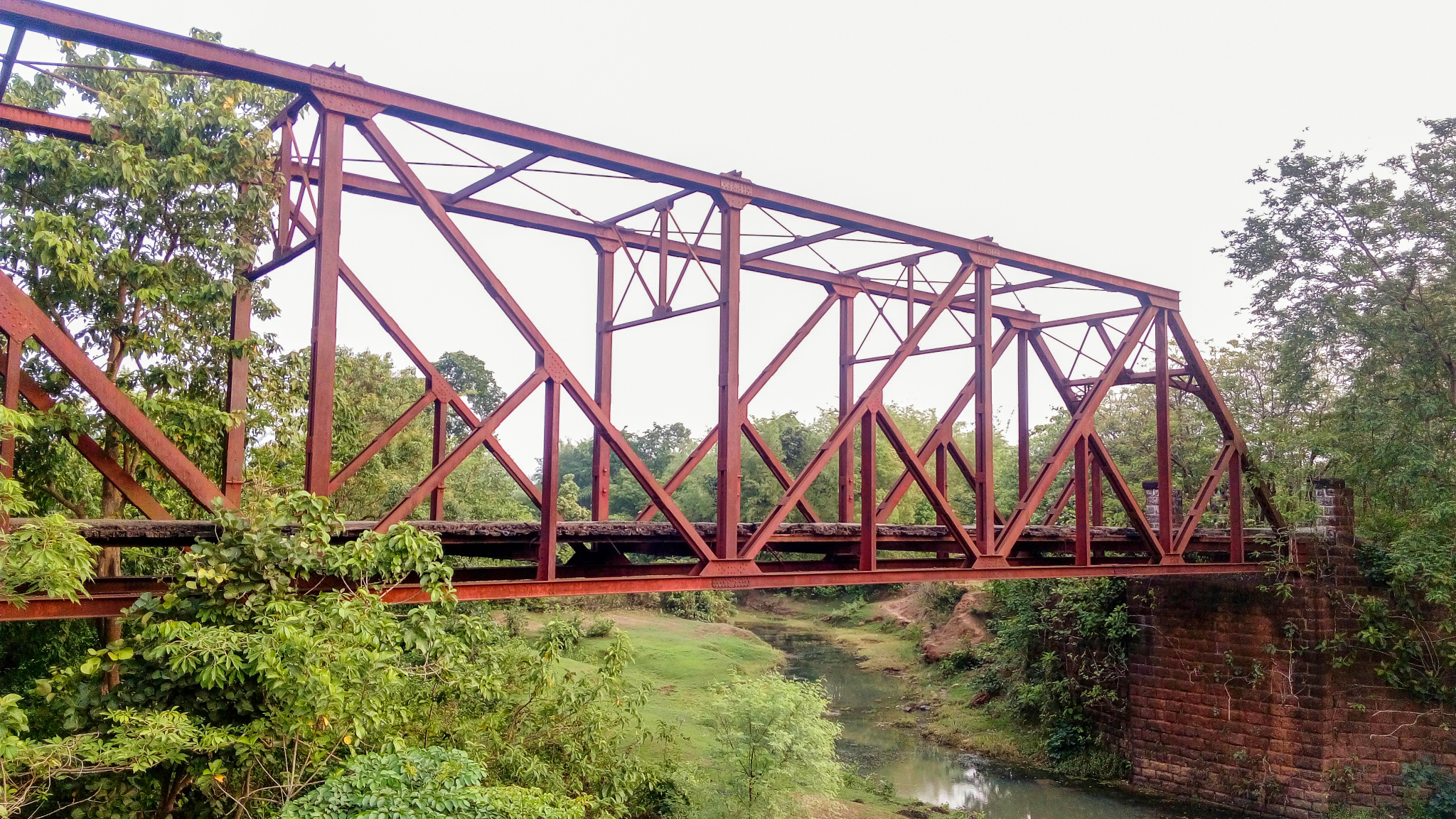
Defunct Naupal Iron Bridge in Mayurbhanj

It is known as Old Kolkata-Mumbai Road prior to 1999 period used to go via Kharagpur, Jhargram, Chilkigarh, Chichra, Gopiballavpur, Kandnashol, Murgabadi, near Baripada, Bhajpur Chowk in Bhanjpur, Gangraj, Kalabadia, Pathuri to Bangriposi. In the 1999-2002 period, the Baharagora-Bangriposi Highway was constructed and the traffic of Old Mumbai Road shifted on that stretch. Then Old Mumbai Road lost its importance.
