= Sunei Dam =

Dam in Kaptipada, Mayurbhanj, India

- Location within Odisha Location within India
- Official name: Sunei Dam
- Country: India
- Location: Kaptipada, Mayurbhanj district
- Coordinates: 21.4408°N 86.4516°E
- Purpose: Irrigation, Hydroelectric
- Status: Operational
- Construction began: 1977
- Opening date: 1990; 36 years ago

Dam and spillways
- Impounds: Sone River
- Height: 70.5 m (231 ft)
- Length: 1,040 m (3,412 ft)
- Dam volume: 62.50 Mm³
- Spillways: 6
- Spillway type: Ogee shaped gravity
- Spillway length: 12.0 m
- Spillway capacity: 1,865 m³/s

Reservoir
- Catchment area: 227 km²

Power Station
- Turbines: 5 x 50 MW
- Installed capacity: 250 MW

Sunei Dam is a dam located in Odisha, India.Sunei Dam is located at latitude 21° 28‘ N, longitude 87° 28’ E, at Salchua village of Kaptipada block, about 21 km south of Udala town. The drainage area of Sunei up to the confluence with the Burhabalanga river is nearly 1200 km^{2}, while the catchment area of the dam site is 227 km sq.

== History ==
The Sunei irrigation project was conceived in 1963 to establish a reservoir system along the Sono river and its tributaries to support agriculture with sufficient water supply. Construction of the Sunei irrigation system began in 1977 and was completed by 1987. Initially, it was intended to cover 7,200 hectares, but in the 1980s, the service area was expanded to 12,500 hectares. This extension included the Barahmpur area of Balasore district, extending from Radho Dam, the terminal point of the Sunei irrigation project. The reservoir was filled in 1983, with full operation of the Mayurbhanj portion achieved in 1990, followed by the Balasore portion in 1992.

== Construction ==
The Sunei Medium Irrigation scheme is located in the Northeast of Orissa State, in the Burhabalanga river basin, which outfalls to the Bay of Bengal. The Sono river, a tributary of the Burhabalanga, originates from the Similipal hill range in Mayurbhanj District, travels in the districts of Mayurbhanj meets the river Burhabalanga, after travelling 80 km from its source. The Chief Engineer were C.E. & B.M., S.& B. Basin, Laxmiposi, Baripada

== Description ==
Location of reservoir
WS: Wildlife Sanctuary, WR: Water Reservoir

The Sunei scheme is surrounded with lush green forests, with thick coverage in the Similipal region, thinning towards the periphery. The Similipal National Park and its tiger reserve, and the Similipal-Kuldiha-Hadagarh Elephant Reserve are situated to the north of the scheme. (Both the reserves constitute part of the UNESCO world network of Biosphere Reserve since 2009) Similarly Devkunda, a divine scenic spot popular with tourists due to its water fall and natural beauty, is situated 25 km from Udala and 3 km from Kaptipada. The height of the dam is 30m and the length of the dam 2134m.

== Distance ==
- 7 km from Kaptiada
- 14 km from Udala
- 60 km from Baripada
