= Kaptipada Estate =

State of India during the British Raj

Kaptipada Estate କପ୍ତିପଦା ଗଡ଼ଜାତ ରାଜ୍ୟ
- Zamindari of Mayurbhanj State
- 15th century–1952
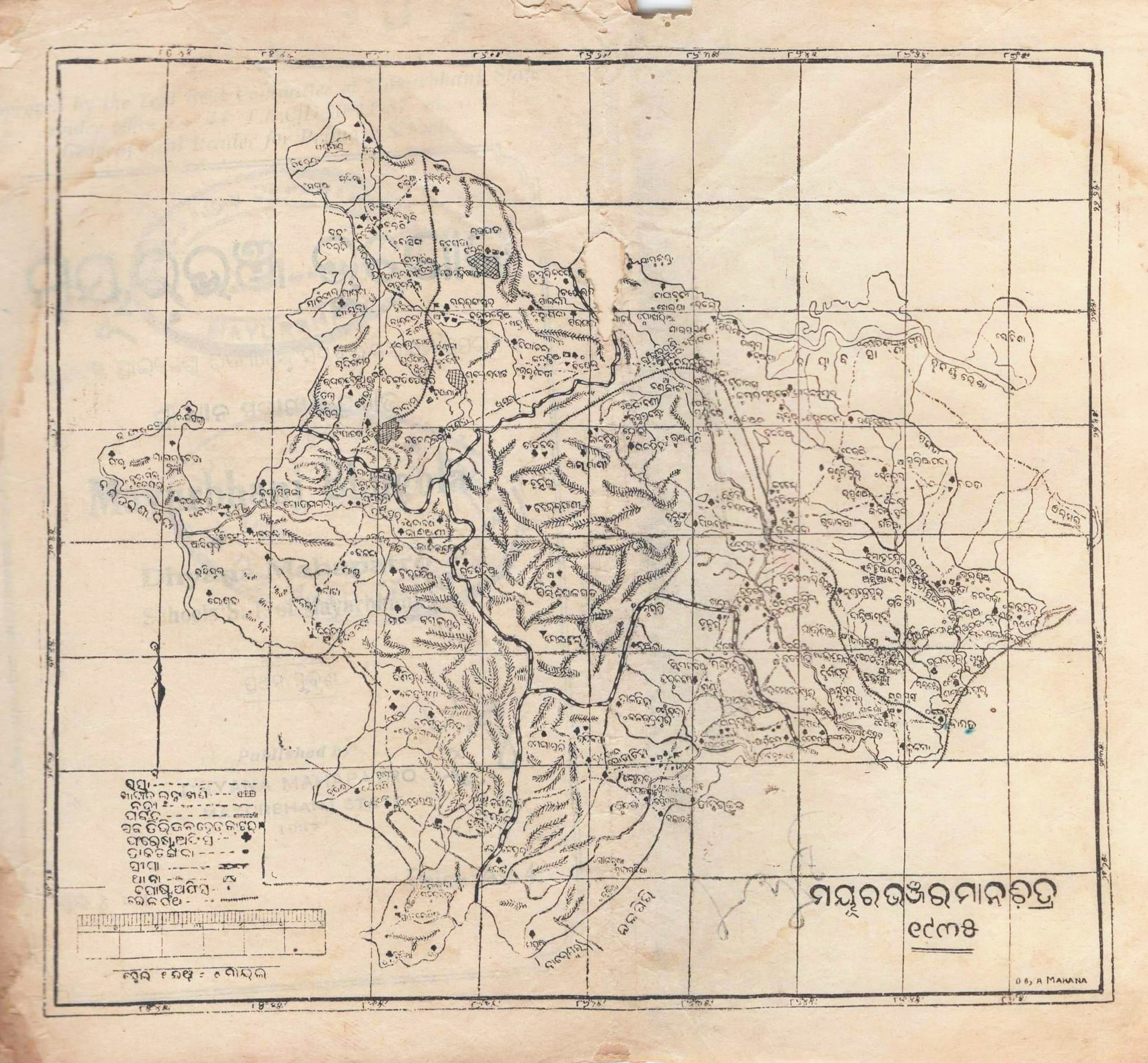
- Map of Mayurbhanj State, 1935
- Capital: Kainsari; Kaptipada
- Area
  - 1890: 518 km^{2} (200 sq mi)
  - Type: Royal rules
- History
  - Established: 15th century
  - Merged with Mayurbhanj State: 1890
  - Accession to the Union of India: 1949
  - Estate Abolition: 1952
Succeeded by
Republic of India
- Today part of: Mayurbhanj, Odisha, India

Kaptipada estate was one of the princely states of India during the period of the British Raj. It was located in eastern India and surrounded by Mayurbhanj state in north and west, Nilgiri state in east and Keonjhar state in south. The state was believed to founded by Naga Chief Phanimukuta during the rule of Gajapati ruler Kapileswar Dev about the middle of 15th century A.D.

== History ==
In the 15th century CE, during Kapileswara Deva's reign, the Kaptipada state was believed to established by Naga Chief Phanimukuta. Phanimukuta, a loyal vassal of Kapileswara Deva, fortified his stronghold in Kainsari with a formidable fort. His son, Vasanta Virata, later earned the title "Jaya Bhujanga" for his valor during Purusottam Deva's campaigns. Vasanta Virata's rule was marked by territorial disputes along the undefined eastern boundary, leading to conflicts with Chiefs Nilambara, Giridhari, and Sankara. After a protracted battle, Vasanta Virata emerged victorious, merging the conquered land into "Nilagiri." The lineage continued through successors like Jayakumara Virata Bhujanga, Ajaya Kumar Abhinava Bhujanga, and Niladwaja Kumar Parikshita Bhujanga. Ultimately, Saratchandra Jaya Bhujanga relocated the capital to Kaptipada village along the Sone river, solidifying Kaptipada's legacy.

The lineage continued with Nrusimha Charan's son, Chandrasekhar Mandhata, succeeded by Ramchandra Mandhata. During Pitambara Mandhata's rule, a Paik Rebellion erupted, and the rebels seized Kaptipada's fort. Pitambara Mandhata, along with his wife Subhadra Devi and their son Birabara, sought refuge inside the Virata Pata temple until the rebellion was quelled. A woman from the barber caste reportedly led Kaptipada's army against the rebels, securing victory and being rewarded with the rent-free village of Taldiha. Abhinava Bhujanga Pitambara Mandhata was succeeded by his son Parikshita Bhujanga Birabara Mandhata, who cut short by madness, and his queen, Sita Devi, managed the administration on behalf of their minor son, Divyasimha Mandhata. During her regency, a Second Paik Rebellion erupted, and Sita Devi herself courageously led Kaptipada's troops in a fierce battle at Suneikundi tank (present-day Sunei Dam) that resulted in the rebels' retreat. In Divyasimha Mandhata's reign, another rebellion arose in 1880, leading to the burning of Kaptipada's fort. Divyasimha and his family fled the flames but ultimately quelled the rebellion and reconstructed the fort.

Jaya Bhujanga Divyasimha Mandhata, renowned for his simplicity and honesty, grappled with recurring rebellions and revenue collection issues. At that time Mayurbhanj state was under the Court of Wards due to a minor ruler, with P. Wylly serving as Manager. Following a request from Sriram Chandra Bhanja Deo, the Kaptipada estate, covering an area of 518 sq km, merged with Mayurbhanj in 1890. Subsequently, the estate's status was reduced to a Sabarakari estate. The merger incited a sudden revolt as rebels looted the palace, resulting in injuries to both the Raja and Rani. Police from Baripada intervened to restore order and punished the culprits. Divyasimha ruled Kaptipada until his death in 1903, after which he was succeeded by Virata Bhujanga Gaura Chandra Mandhata. Following India's independence, on January 1, 1949, Mayurbhanj state merged with Odisha. Consequently, the Sarbarkari status of Kaptipada was taken over by the government under section 3(1) of the Orissa Estate Abolition Act on November 27, 1952.

== Demographics ==
Historical population
Year	Pop.	±%
1911	22,922	—
1921	28,258	+23.3%
1931	35,892	+27.0%
Source: Census of Mayurbhanj state

== Rulers ==
=== Headquartered at Kainsari ===
1. Naga Chief Phanimukta (founder of the state)

2. Vasanta Virata (Gajapati Purushottam Dev awarded "Jaya Bhujanga" title)

3. Ajay Kumar Abhinava Bhujanga

4. Niladwaja Kumar Parikshita Bhujanga

=== Headquartered at Kaptipada ===
1. Sarat Chandra Bhujanga

2-27. (There are 27 ruler ruled the state, but no reliable data available)

28. Nrusimha Charan Mandata

29. Rama Chandra Mandata

30. Abhinava Bhujanga Pitambara Mandata

31. Parikshita Bhujanga Birabara Mandata

32. Jaya Bhujanga Divyaaimha Mandata

33. Virata Bhujanga Goura Chandra Mandata

=== Titular ===
1. Rajat Chandra Abhinava Bhujanga

2. Pramoda Chandra Parikshita Bhujanga
