= Bhaskar Madhei =

Indian politician

Member of the Odisha Legislative Assembly
- Incumbent
- Assumed office 2019
- Preceded by: Golak Bihari Nayak
- Constituency: Udala
- In office 2000–2009
- Preceded by: Rabaneswar Madhei
- Succeeded by: Shrinath Soren

Personal details
- Born: 5 June 1969 (age 56) Nachhipur, Udala, Mayurbhanj District, Odisha
- Party: Bhartiya Janta Party
- Spouse: Basanti Madhei
- Parent: Bhukila Madhei (father)
- Education: Matriculation
- Occupation: Agriculturist, Politician

Bhaskar Madhei is an Indian politician, serving as 11th, 12th and 15th Member of the Legislative Assembly of Udala Assembly constituency.

== Personal life ==
Bhaskar was born on 5 June 1969, and belongs to the Bathudi tribe. His father's name is Bhukil Madhei, and he has completed his education up to Matriculation in Arts. Bhaskar is married to Basanti Madhei and has four children including two daughters.

== Political career ==
Bhaskar Madhei commenced his political journey at the age of 26 as a candidate for the Udala assembly constituency's MLA in 1995. He was then elected twice as an MLA in the Odisha Legislative Assembly in 2000 and 2004 and is currently holding the same position in the 16th Odisha Legislative Assembly from 2019.

During his political career he was member of Committee on Government Assurances, Committee on Members' Amenities, Standing Committee on Works, Tourism & Culture, H& UD, I & PR (No.3), Standing Committee on PR & RD (No.9), Subject Committee on Water Resources and Library Committee.

2024 Vidhan Sabha Election: Udala
Party	Candidate	Votes	%	±%
BJP	Bhaskar Madhei	66,401	42	
BJD	Srinath Soren	59,884	37.88	
INC	Durga Charan Tudu	15,857	10.03	
JMM	Chakradhar Sing	7,017	4.44	
Majority		6,517	4.12	
Turnout		1,58,081		
Registered electors		1,98,170		

Electoral history of Bhaskar Madhei
Election	House	Constituency	Party	Votes	%	Result	Ref.
2024	Odisha Legislative Assembly	Udala	BJP	66,401	42	Won	
2019	Odisha Legislative Assembly	Udala	BJP	69,725	45.48	Won	
2014	Odisha Legislative Assembly	Udala	BJP	41,099	29.79	Lost	
2004	Odisha Legislative Assembly	Udala	BJP	32,755	22.06	Won	
2000	Odisha Legislative Assembly	Udala	BJP	43,539	53.42	Won	
1995	Odisha Legislative Assembly	Udala	BJP	10,144	10.78	Lost	
