= Nudadiha =

Village in Orissa, India

Coordinates: 21.554935°N 86.493848°E

Nudadiha (alternately spelled as Nodhadiha) is a village that is located in the Kaptipada block of Mayurbhanj district, Odisha, India. As of 2001, it had a population of 1161 persons spread over 239 households. The village has a near even male to female distribution ratio. It is the main village for the Nudadiha gram panchayat, which includes the adjacent villages of Sarbanaghaty, Nuagan, Kukurdima, Talia, Nandursahi, Potaldiha, and Narsinghbedha.

It has two primary schools, one middle school (English medium), and three high schools. One junior cum degree college and one Sanskrit college is also located in the village. These educational institutions fulfill the educational needs of the village as well as the nearby villages. This village has beautiful temples and natural sceneries around. Birat kshetra Jagannathtemple is newly added since February 2024. Since 20 years Tarini temple is continuing its blessings. Within 3 km is a beautiful tourist place, KALO Dam.
