= Debakunda =

Waterfall in Odisha, India

- Devkund
- ଦେବକୁଣ୍ଡ (Odia)
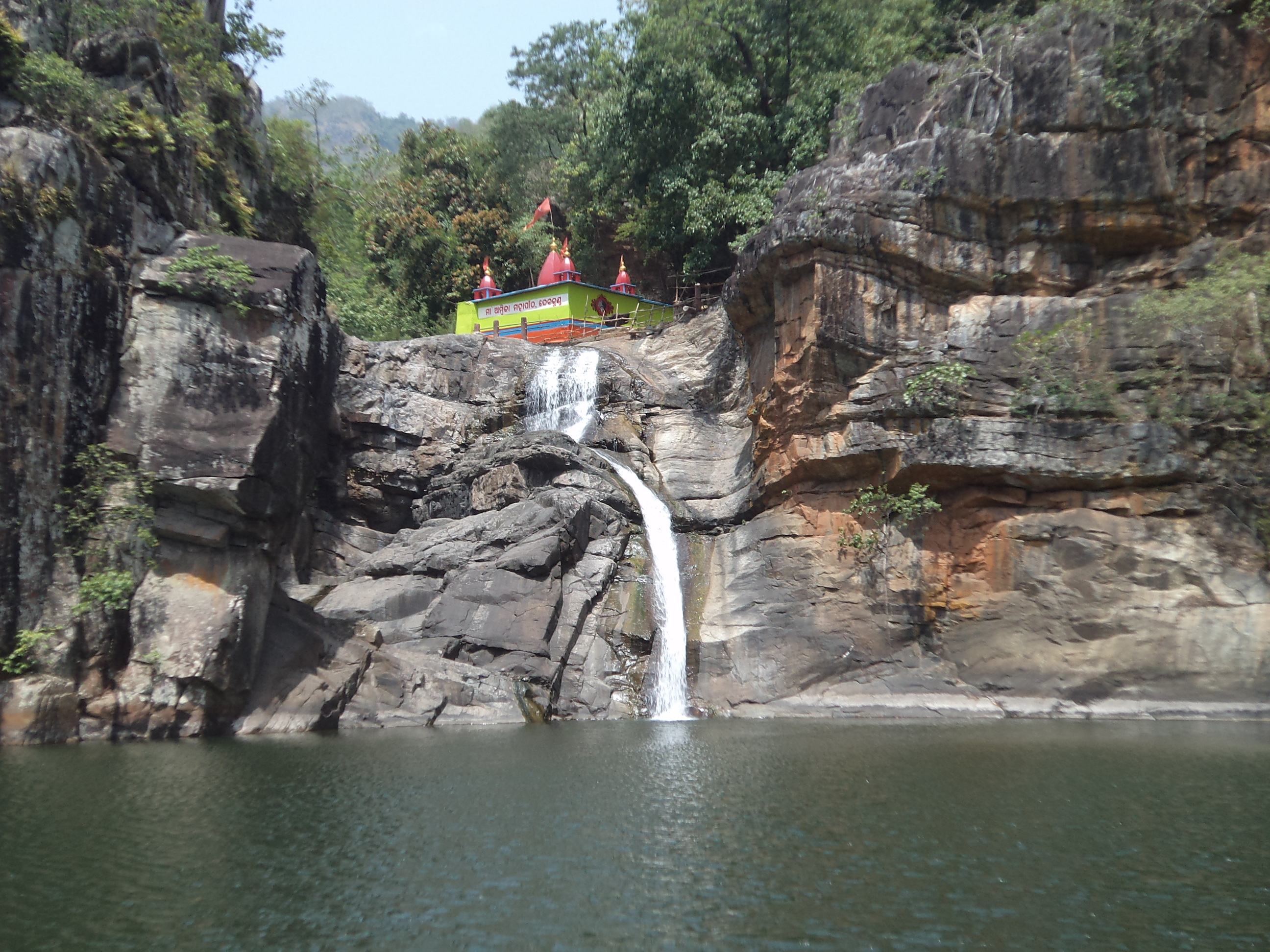
- Debakunda waterfall and pond

- Location within Odisha
- Location: Mayurbhanj, Odisha, India
- Group: Debakunda, Devikunda, Bhudarkunda, Tailakunda, Haridrakunda
- Coordinates: 21.70°N 86.44°E
- Type: Sweet
- Etymology: Deity
- Part of: Simlipal National Park

Debakunda or Devkund is a naturally created pond located in the Mayurbhanj district of Odisha, India—part of the Simlipal National Park. The pond was created by flowing water from an adjacent waterfall.

There is a temple dedicated to the goddess Ambika. It was built by Rajkumar Prafulla Chandra Bhanja Deo, a researcher and a king during the British Raj, who stayed at Debakunda and found the goddess' idol in a sleeping posture above the waterfall. The temple is located at the top of the lowest waterfall, which is known as Debakunda. The sleeping idol is naturally formed over the rocky mountain. Additionally, the goddesses Lalita, Kurukulla, and Bhoga-malini are worshipped. The mountain is called Bhimashan Hill (ଭୀମାସନ ପାହାଡ), where the flowing fountain creates five ponds, named Bhudarkunda, Tailakunda, Haridrakunda, Devikunda, and Debakunda, respectively.

Debakunda is home to various lichen species from the family Parmeliaceae. Various orchids are also found deeper in the forest.

== Location ==
Debakunda is located 25 km (16 mi) from Udala, 65 km (40 mi) from Baripada and 70 km (43 mi) from Balasore. It is situated at the outermost part of Similipal National Park.

== Etymology ==
Debakunda is a combination of two Odia words, deba 'deity', and kunda 'small pond, tub'. The entire fountain is said to be guarded by different deities, who are different forms of Shakti. Debakunda is the lowest waterfall of the mountain. Above that, the pond is known as Devikunda, beside which the Ambika temple is located. Opposite Ambika temple, on the other side of the pond, there is a rock containing 100 shivalingas, known as Shata-Rudra Shila (Odia: ଶତରୁଦ୍ର ଶିଳା). The pond above Devikunda is known as Bhudarkunda. The goddess Varahi is said to reside to the north, right above Bhudarkunda. The next pond is called Tailakunda (ତୈଳ କୁଣ୍ଡ), where taila means 'oil' in Odia and Sanskrit, and kunda means 'pond'. The water of Tailakunda is darker than that of the other ponds. The residing deity of that pond is believed to be the goddess Bhuvaneshwari. The top-most body of water is called Haridrakunda. Haridra means 'turmeric'; the water has a yellow tint, thus its name. The residing goddesses of the pond are believed to be the goddesses Matangi and Gouri. The sleeping idol of the goddess Ambika is kept hidden from the public; its silhouette can be seen as a woman lying with her legs straightened, which are clearly visible. There is a Shiva lingam in her yoni, believed to create high levels of spiritual energy at the site.
