= Kaptipada =

Community development block of Mayurbhanj, Odisha

Kaptipada କପ୍ତିପଦା
- Rural
- Kaptipada C.D. Block
- Location within Odisha
- Coordinates: 21.516°N 86.529°E
- State: Odisha
- District: Mayurbhanj
- Subdivision: Kaptipada Subdivision
- Named for: Kaptipada Estate

Area
  - Total: 647.53 km^{2} (250.01 sq mi)
- Elevation: 14 m (46 ft)

Population (2011)
  - Total: 148,717
  - Density: 229.67/km^{2} (594.84/sq mi)
  - Scheduled Castes: 5,854 (3.94%)
  - Scheduled Tribes: 99,054 (66.61%)

Demographic
  - Literacy rate: 66.76%
- PIN: 757040
- ISO 3166 code: IN-OR
- Vehicle registration: OD-11-XXXX

Kaptipada is a community development block that forms an administrative division in Kaptipada subdivision of Mayurbhanj district in the Indian state of Odisha. Kaptipada was a Kaptipada estate, which was merged with Mayurbhanj State in 1890.

== Demographics ==
Kaptipada block located in the south-eastern part of Mayurbhanj. It is surrounded by Udala C.D. Block from north-west, north, and north-east, Balasore District from east and south, Keonjhar District from south-west, Thakurmunda C.D. Block from west. It is located in the north-central plateau of Odisha. The total geographical area of the block is 626.73 km^{2} (241.98 sq mi) out of which 133.07 km^{2} (51.38 sq mi) is forest area. The block has 26 Gram Panchayat i.e., Kolialam, J.P.S. Jamdiha, Nuddiha, Pedagodi, Badbisole, Debala, Pingu, Badgudgudia, Chakradharpur, Kaptipada, Jhinkpada, Badkhaladi, Salchua, Jadida, Jambani, Majhigadia, Mankadapada, Ranipokhari, Notta, Sarat, Saradiha, Kalamgadia, Padmapokhari, Labanyadeipur, Ramchandrapur and Dewani Bahali. The total population of this block is 1,48,717, which is dominated by Scheduled Tribes people like Bathudi, Kolha, Santal, Gond, Saunti and the mejor used languages are Odia, Santali, Ho, Bengali, Kui.

== Education ==
Kaptipada CD block has 120 primary schools, 54 upper primary schools and 36 High schools. There are two colleges named Kaptipada college, Kaptipada and Kaptipada college, Nuasahi both are affiliated to North Odisha University.

== Tourist attractions ==
Kaptipada, situated within the southern core zone of Similipal National Park and encircled by Similipal Tiger Reserve, Hadgarh Wildlife Sanctuary, and Kuldiha Wildlife Sanctuary, forms a popular nature tourist destination.

- Sunei Dam
- Kalo Dam
- Jhinkeswar temple
- Samibrukya

== Villages ==
- Bada Bisol
- Gaudogan
- Jarada
- Kaptipada
- Karapada
- Kuanrpur
- Mahulabani
- Nudadiha
- Patpur
- Pedagadi
- Rathipur
- Sano Bisol
- Srabana Ghati
