= Fourth Naveen Patnaik ministry =

Government of Odisha (2014 – 2019)

- 28th Ministry of Odisha
- 2014 – 2019
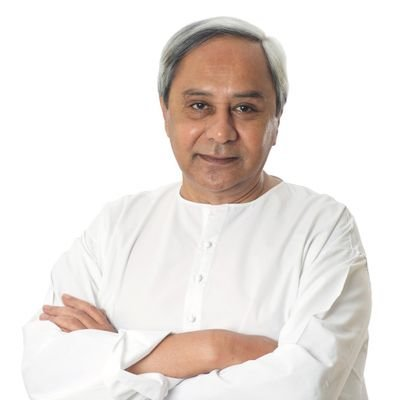
- Naveen Patnaik; Hon'ble Chief Minister of Odisha
- Date formed: 21 May 2014
- Date dissolved: 28 May 2019

People and organisations
- Governor: S.C. Jamir; Satya Pal Malik (Additional Charge); Ganeshi Lal
- Chief Minister: Naveen Patnaik
- No. of ministers: 22
- Member parties: Biju Janata Dal
- Status in legislature: Majority
- Opposition party: Indian National Congress
- Opposition leader: Narasingha Mishra

History
- Incoming formation: 15th Odisha Legislative Assembly
- Outgoing formation: 14th Odisha Legislative Assembly
- Election: 2014 Assembly election
- Legislature terms: 5 years, 7 days
- Predecessor: Third Naveen Patnaik ministry
- Successor: Fifth Naveen Patnaik ministry

Naveen Patnaik was elected as chief minister of Odisha for the fourth time in 2014 after securing a landslide victory in 2014 Odisha Legislative Assembly election. The elections were held in the state in two phases coinciding with 2014 Indian general election. The results were declared on 16 May 2014. Biju Janata Dal secured 117 seats out of 147 in the fifteenth Odisha Legislative Assembly. The ministry was informally known as Naveen 4.0.

== Brief history ==
Chief Minister Naveen Patnaik along with 10 Cabinet Ministers and 10 Minister of State with Independent Charges were administered the oath of office and secrecy by Governor S. C. Jamir at the Raj Bhavan, Bhubaneswar on 21 May 2014.

First major Cabinet reshuffle took place on 8 May 2017 with induction of 10 new minister. Second minor Cabinet reshuffle took place on 5 February 2018.

After securing a historic fifth term by winning 2019 Odisha Assembly election, Mr. Patnaik resigned on 28 May 2019.

== Council of Ministers ==
Source
Portfolio	Portrait	Name Constituency	Tenure		Party
Chief Minister; Home; General Administration; Other departments not allocated to any Minister.		Naveen Patnaik; MLA from Hinjili	20 May 2014	28 May 2019	BJD
Water Resources; Works		Naveen Patnaik; MLA from Hinjili	20 May 2014	3 March 2018	BJD
Public Grievances & Pension Administration		Naveen Patnaik; MLA from Hinjili	7 May 2017	28 May 2019	BJD
Cabinet Minister
Finance		Pradip Kumar Amat; MLA from Boudh	20 May 2014	7 May 2017	BJD
Finance		Shashi Bhusan Behera; MLA from Kendrapara	7 May 2017	28 May 2019	BJD
Public Enterprises		Pradip Kumar Amat; MLA from Boudh	20 May 2014	7 May 2017	BJD
Public Enterprises		Damodar Rout; MLA from Paradeep	7 May 2017	22 December 2017	BJD
Public Enterprises		Shashi Bhusan Behera; MLA from Kendrapara	22 December 2017	3 March 2018	BJD
Public Enterprises		Bikram Keshari Arukha; MLA from Bhanjanagar	3 March 2018	28 May 2019	BJD
Health & Family Welfare		Pradip Kumar Amat; MLA from Boudh	21 October 2016	7 May 2017	BJD
Health & Family Welfare		Pratap Jena; MLA from Mahanga	7 May 2017	28 May 2019	BJD
Law		Pratap Jena; MLA from Mahanga	7 May 2017	28 May 2019	BJD
Excise		Damodar Rout; MLA from Paradeep	20 May 2014	7 May 2017	BJD
Excise		Shashi Bhusan Behera; MLA from Kendrapara	7 May 2017	28 May 2019	BJD
Co-operation		Damodar Rout; MLA from Paradeep	20 May 2014	7 May 2017	BJD
Co-operation		Surjya Narayan Patro; MLA from Digapahandi	7 May 2017	28 May 2019	BJD
Food Supplies & Consumer Welfare		Surjya Narayan Patro; MLA from Digapahandi	7 May 2017	28 May 2019	BJD
Industries		Debi Prasad Mishra; MLA from Baramba	20 May 2014	7 May 2017	BJD
Industries		Niranjan Pujari; MLA from Sonepur	7 May 2017	3 March 2018	BJD
School & Mass Education		Debi Prasad Mishra; MLA from Baramba	20 May 2014	7 May 2017	BJD
School & Mass Education		Badri Narayan Patra; MLA from Ghasipura	7 May 2017	28 May 2019	BJD
Science & Technology		Badri Narayan Patra; MLA from Ghasipura	7 May 2017	28 May 2019	BJD
Agriculture		Pradeep Maharathy; MLA from Pipili	20 May 2014	7 May 2017	BJD
Agriculture & Farmer Empowerment		Damodar Rout; MLA from Paradeep	7 May 2017	22 December 2017	BJD
Agriculture & Farmer Empowerment		Pradeep Maharathy; MLA from Pipili	22 December 2017	6 January 2019	BJD
Agriculture & Farmer Empowerment		Shashi Bhusan Behera; MLA from Kendrapara	6 January 2019	28 May 2019	BJD
Fisheries & Animal Resources Development		Pradeep Maharathy; MLA from Pipili	20 May 2014	7 May 2017	BJD
Fisheries & Animal Resources Development		Damodar Rout; MLA from Paradeep	7 May 2017	22 December 2017	BJD
Fisheries & Animal Resources Development		Pradeep Maharathy; MLA from Pipili	22 December 2017	6 January 2019	BJD
Fisheries & Animal Resources Development		Shashi Bhusan Behera; MLA from Kendrapara	6 January 2019	28 May 2019	BJD
Panchayati Raj & Drinking Water		Pradeep Maharathy; MLA from Pipili	7 May 2017	6 January 2019	BJD
Panchayati Raj & Drinking Water		Ramesh Chandra Majhi; MLA from Jharigam	6 January 2019	28 May 2019	BJD
Revenue & Disaster Management		Bijayshree Routray; MLA from Basudevpur	20 May 2014	7 May 2017	BJD
Revenue & Disaster Management		Maheswar Mohanty; MLA from Puri	7 May 2017	28 May 2019	BJD
Parliamentary Affairs		Bikram Keshari Arukha; MLA from Bhanjanagar	20 May 2014	28 May 2019	BJD
Forest & Environment		Bikram Keshari Arukha; MLA from Bhanjanagar	20 May 2014	7 May 2017	BJD
Forest & Environment		Bijayshree Routray; MLA from Basudevpur	7 May 2017	28 May 2019	BJD
Rural Development		Badri Narayan Patra; MLA from Ghasipura	20 May 2014	7 May 2017	BJD
Rural Development		Bikram Keshari Arukha; MLA from Bhanjanagar	7 May 2017	28 May 2019	BJD
Information & Public Relations		Bikram Keshari Arukha; MLA from Bhanjanagar	21 October 2016	3 March 2018	BJD
Information & Public Relations		Pratap Jena; MLA from Mahanga	3 March 2018	28 May 2019	BJD
Women & Child Development		Usha Devi; MLA from Chikiti	20 May 2014	7 May 2017	BJD
Women & Child Development		Prafulla Samal; MLA from Bhandaripokhari	7 May 2017	28 May 2019	BJD
Mission Shakti		Prafulla Samal; MLA from Bhandaripokhari	7 May 2017	28 May 2019	BJD
Planning & Convergence		Usha Devi; MLA from Chikiti	20 May 2014	28 May 2019	BJD
Skill Development & Technical Education		Usha Devi; MLA from Chikiti	7 May 2017	28 May 2019	BJD
Social Security & Empowerment of Persons with Disability		Usha Devi; MLA from Chikiti	27 May 2015	7 May 2017	BJD
Social Security & Empowerment of Persons with Disability		Prafulla Samal; MLA from Bhandaripokhari	7 May 2017	28 May 2019	BJD
S.T. & S.C. Development, Minorities & Backward Classes Welfare		Lal Bihari Himirika; MLA from Rayagada	20 May 2014	7 May 2017	BJD
S.T. & S.C. Development, Minorities & Backward Classes Welfare		Ramesh Chandra Majhi; MLA from Jharigam	7 May 2017	28 May 2019	BJD
Micro, Small & Medium Enterprises		Jogendra Behera; MLA from Loisingha	20 May 2014	7 May 2017	BJD
Micro, Small & Medium Enterprises		Prafulla Samal; MLA from Bhandaripokhari	7 May 2017	28 May 2019	BJD
Public Grievances & Pension Administration		Jogendra Behera; MLA from Loisingha	20 May 2014	7 May 2017	BJD
Housing & Urban Development		Puspendra Singh Deo; MLA from Dharmagarh	20 May 2014	7 May 2017	BJD
Housing & Urban Development		Niranjan Pujari; MLA from Sonepur	7 May 2017	28 May 2019	BJD
Water Resources		Niranjan Pujari; MLA from Sonepur	3 March 2018	28 May 2019	BJD
Energy		Prafulla Kumar Mallik; MLA from Kamakshyanagar	7 May 2017	3 March 2018	BJD
Steel & Mines		Prafulla Kumar Mallik; MLA from Kamakshyanagar	7 May 2017	28 May 2019	BJD
Works		Prafulla Kumar Mallik; MLA from Kamakshyanagar	3 March 2018	28 May 2019	BJD
Ministers of State with Independent Charges
Culture; Tourism		Ashok Chandra Panda; MLA from Ekamra Bhubaneswar	20 May 2014	28 May 2019	BJD
Handlooms, Textiles & Handicrafts		Snehangini Chhuria; MLA from Attabira	20 May 2014	28 May 2019	BJD
Steel & Mines		Prafulla Kumar Mallik; MLA from Kamakshyanagar	20 May 2014	7 May 2017	BJD
Labour & Employees' State Insurance		Prafulla Kumar Mallik; MLA from Kamakshyanagar	20 May 2014	7 May 2017	BJD
Labour & Employees' State Insurance		Susanta Singh; MLA from Bhatli	7 May 2017	28 May 2019	BJD
Commerce and Transport		Ramesh Chandra Majhi; MLA from Jharigam	20 May 2014	7 May 2017	BJD
Commerce and Transport		Nrushingha Charan Sahu; MLA from Parjanga	7 May 2017	28 May 2019	BJD
Health & Family Welfare; Information & Public Relations		Atanu Sabyasachi Nayak; MLA from Mahakalapada	20 May 2014	21 October 2016	BJD
Panchayati Raj; Law		Arun Kumar Sahoo MLA from Nayagarh	20 May 2014	7 May 2017	BJD
Food Supplies & Consumer Welfare; Employment & Technical Education & Training		Sanjay Kumar Das Burma; MLA from Brahmagiri	20 May 2014	7 May 2017	BJD
Sports & Youth Services		Sudam Marndi; MLA from Bangriposi	20 May 2014	7 May 2017	BJD
Sports & Youth Services		Chandra Sarathi Behera; MLA from Cuttack Sadar	7 May 2017	28 May 2019	BJD
Information Technology		Pranab Prakash Das; MLA from Jajpur	20 May 2014	7 May 2017	BJD
Electronics & Information Technology		Chandra Sarathi Behera; MLA from Cuttack Sadar	7 May 2017	28 May 2019	BJD
Energy		Pranab Prakash Das; MLA from Jajpur	20 May 2014	7 May 2017	BJD
Energy		Susanta Singh; MLA from Bhatli	3 March 2018	28 May 2019	BJD
Science & Technology		Pradeep Kumar Panigrahy; MLA from Gopalpur	20 May 2014	7 May 2017	BJD
Higher Education		Pradeep Kumar Panigrahy; MLA from Gopalpur	20 May 2014	7 May 2017	BJD
Higher Education		Ananta Das; MLA from Bhograi	7 May 2017	28 May 2019	BJD
Industries		Ananta Das; MLA from Bhograi	3 March 2018	28 May 2019	BJD
Ministers of State
Tribal welfare		Sudam Marndi; MLA from Bangriposi	20 May 2014	7 May 2017	BJD
SC welfare; Mission Shakti		Snehangini Chhuria; MLA from Attabira	20 May 2014	7 May 2017	BJD
Rural Water Supply		Pradeep Kumar Panigrahy; MLA from Gopalpur	20 May 2014	7 May 2017	BJD
Disability Welfare		Pranab Prakash Das; MLA from Jajpur	20 May 2014	7 May 2017	BJD

== Demographics ==
Division	District	Ministers	Cabinet Ministers	Ministers of State
Northern	Angul	0	–	–
Northern	Balangir	1	Jogendra Behera	–
Northern	Bargarh	2	–	Snehangini Chhuria; Susanta Singh
Northern	Dhenkanal	2	Prafulla Kumar Mallik	Nrusingha Charan Sahu
Northern	Deogarh	0	–	–
Northern	Jharsuguda	0	–	–
Northern	Keonjhar	1	Badri Narayan Patra	–
Northern	Subarnapur	1	Niranjan Pujari	–
Northern	Sambalpur	0	–	–
Northern	Sundergarh	0	–	–
Central	Balasore	1	–	Ananta Das
Central	Bhadrak	2	Bijayshree Routray; Prafulla Samal	–
Central	Cuttack	3	Debi Prasad Mishra; Pratap Jena	Chandra Sarathi Behera
Central	Jagatsinghpur	1	Damodar Rout	–
Central	Jajpur	1	–	Pranab Prakash Das
Central	Khorda	1	–	Ashok Chandra Panda
Central	Kendrapara	2	Shashi Bhusan Behera	Atanu Sabyasachi Nayak
Central	Mayurbhanj	1	–	Sudam Marndi
Central	Nayagarh	1	–	Arun Kumar Sahoo
Central	Puri	3	Pradeep Maharathy; Maheswar Mohanty	Sanjay Kumar Das Burma
Southern	Boudh	1	Pradip Kumar Amat	–
Southern	Gajapati	0	–	–
Southern	Ganjam	5	Naveen Patnaik (Chief Minister); Surjya Narayan Patro; Bikram Keshari Arukha; Usha Devi	Pradeep Kumar Panigrahy
Southern	Kalahandi	1	Puspendra Singh Deo	–
Southern	Kandhamal	0	–	–
Southern	Koraput	0	–	–
Southern	Malkangiri	0	–	–
Southern	Nabarangpur	1	Ramesh Chandra Majhi	–
Southern	Nuapada	0	–	–
Southern	Rayagada	1	Lal Bihari Himirika	–
