= 14th Odisha Legislative Assembly =

14th state legislature of the Indian state of Odisha

←	13th Assembly	15th Assembly	→
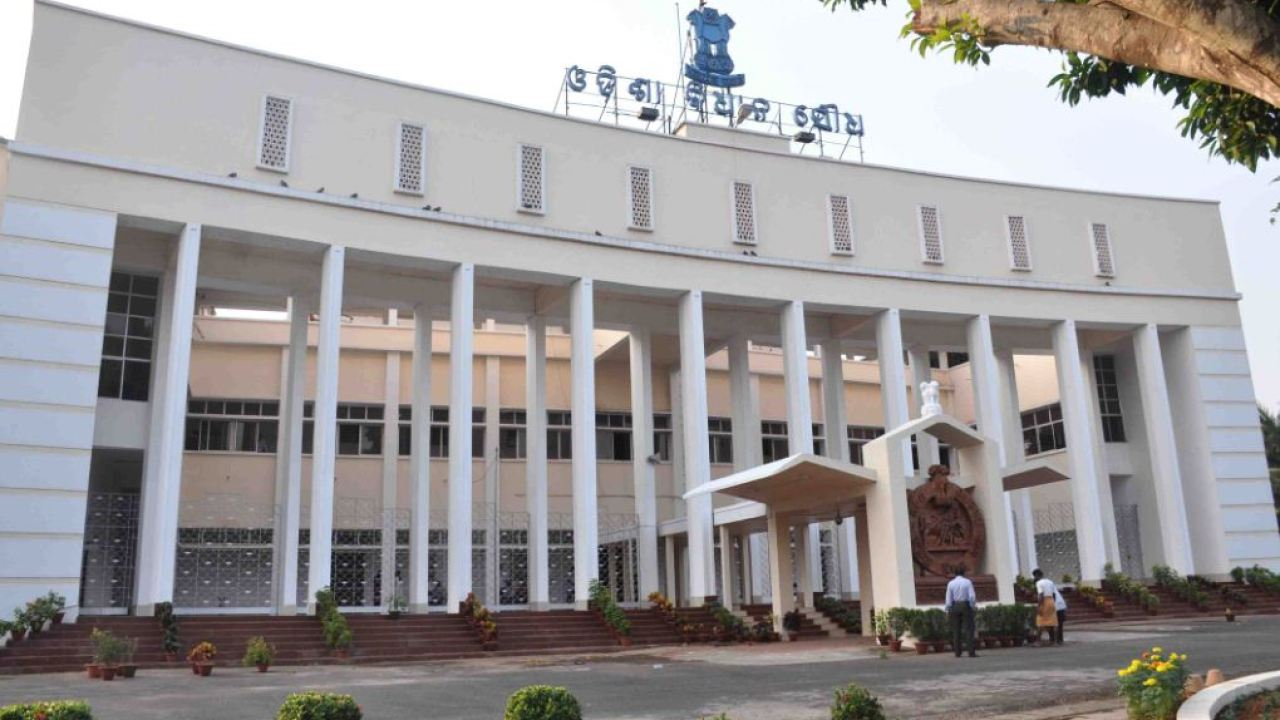
- Front view of Odisha Vidhan Saudha, Bhubaneshwar (2010)

Overview
- Meeting place: Odisha Vidhan Saudha, Bhubaneshwar, Odisha, India
- Term: 19 May 2009 – 18 May 2014
- Election: 2009 Orissa Legislative Assembly election
- Government: Biju Janata Dal
- Opposition: Indian National Congress
- Website: assembly.odisha.gov.in

Odisha Legislative Assembly
- House Composition as assembly begins
- Members: 147
- Governor: Murlidhar Chandrakant Bhandare; S. C. Jamir
- Speaker: Pradip Kumar Amat, BJD
- Deputy Speaker: Lal Bihari Himirika, BJD; Sananda Marndi, BJD
- Leader of the House (Chief Minister): Naveen Patnaik, BJD
- Leader of Opposition: Bhupinder Singh, INC
- Party control: BJD (104/147)
- 15 Sessions with 280 Sittings

The Fourteenth Odisha Legislative Assembly (also Orissa Legislative Assembly until 2011) was convened on after 2009 Orissa Legislative Assembly election. Biju Janata Dal led by Naveen Patnaik formed government for a record 3rd time.

== Brief history ==
After breaking 11 year old alliance with BJP, BJD decided to fight upcoming election independently with limited seat-sharing agreement with NCP, CPM & CPI and won the 2009 Orissa Assembly election with a landslide. Chief Minister Naveen Patnaik along with his council of ministers were sworn in by Governor Murlidhar Chandrakant Bhandare on 21 May 2009. Cabinet reshuffle took place on 10 May 2011 & 2 August 2012 on the backdrop of May 29 2012 political coup against Chief Minister by now expelled senior party leader & Rajya Sabha member Pyarimohan Mohapatra. Despite Modi Wave, BJD had a landslide victory in 2014 Odisha Assembly election. Subsequently, Shri Patnaik gave his resignation to Governor on 20 May 2014.

== House Composition ==
Party	Strength	
Party	Assembly Begins	Assembly Dissolves
Biju Janata Dal	103	108
Indian National Congress	27	26
Bharatiya Janata Party	6	6
Nationalist Congress Party	4	0
Communist Party of India	1	1
Independent	6	5
Vacant	-	1

== Office Bearers ==
Post	Portrait	Name	Tenure		Party
Governor		Murlidhar Chandrakant Bhandare	Assembly Begins	9 March 2013	N/A
Governor		S. C. Jamir	21 March 2013	Assembly Dissolves	N/A
Speaker		Pradip Kumar Amat; MLA from Boudh	25 May 2009	20 May 2014	Biju Janata Dal
Deputy Speaker		Lal Bihari Himirika; MLA from Rayagada	10 June 2009	10 May 2011	Biju Janata Dal
Deputy Speaker		Sananda Marndi; MLA from Baripada	17 August 2011	18 May 2014	Biju Janata Dal
Leader of the House (Chief Minister); Leader of BJD Legislature Party		Naveen Patnaik; MLA from Hinjili	21 May 2009	20 May 2014	Biju Janata Dal
Minister for Parliamentary Affairs		Raghunath Mohanty; MLA from Basta	21 May 2009	2 August 2012	Biju Janata Dal
Minister for Parliamentary Affairs		Kalpataru Das; MLA from Dharmasala	2 August 2012	20 May 2014	Biju Janata Dal
Leader of Opposition; Leader of Congress Legislature Party		Bhupinder Singh; MLA from Narla	27 May 2009	10 March 2014	Indian National Congress
Pro tem Speaker		V. Sugnana Kumari Deo; MLA from Kabisuryanagar	22 May 2009	24 May 2009	Biju Janata Dal

== Council of Ministers ==
Source
Portfolio	Portrait	Name Constituency	Tenure		Party
Chief Minister; Home; General Administration; Water Resources; Works; Other departments not allocated to any Minister.		Naveen Patnaik; MLA from Hinjili	21 May 2009	20 May 2014	BJD
Forest & Environment		Naveen Patnaik; MLA from Hinjili	21 May 2009	10 May 2011	BJD
Agriculture		Naveen Patnaik; MLA from Hinjili	19 January 2012	2 August 2012	BJD
Women & Child Development; Commerce and Transport		Naveen Patnaik; MLA from Hinjili	1 June 2012	2 August 2012	BJD
Housing & Urban Development		Naveen Patnaik; MLA from Hinjili	4 June 2012	2 August 2012	BJD
Cabinet Minister
Revenue & Disaster Management		Surjya Narayan Patro; MLA from Digapahandi	21 May 2009	20 May 2014	BJD
Finance		Prafulla Chandra Ghadei; MLA from Sukinda	21 May 2009	2 August 2012	BJD
Finance		Prasanna Acharya; MLA from Rairakhol	2 August 2012	20 May 2014	BJD
Excise		Prafulla Chandra Ghadei; MLA from Sukinda	21 May 2009	10 May 2011	BJD
Excise		Ananga Udaya Singh Deo; MLA from Bolangir	10 May 2011	10 February 2012	BJD
Excise		Prafulla Chandra Ghadei; MLA from Sukinda	4 June 2012	2 August 2012	BJD
Excise		Niranjan Pujari; MLA from Sonepur	2 August 2012	20 May 2014	BJD
Public Enterprises		Ananga Udaya Singh Deo; MLA from Bolangir	21 May 2009	10 May 2011	BJD
Public Enterprises		Prafulla Chandra Ghadei; MLA from Sukinda	10 May 2011	2 August 2012	BJD
Public Enterprises		Prasanna Acharya; MLA from Rairakhol	2 August 2012	20 May 2014	BJD
Public Grievances & Pension Administration		Prasanna Acharya; MLA from Rairakhol	21 May 2009	2 August 2012	BJD
Planning & Coordination		Ananga Udaya Singh Deo; MLA from Bolangir	21 May 2009	10 February 2012	BJD
Planning & Coordination		Usha Devi; MLA from Chikiti	10 February 2012	2 August 2012	BJD
Planning & Coordination		Maheswar Mohanty; MLA from Puri	2 August 2012	20 May 2014	BJD
Agriculture		Damodar Rout; MLA from Paradeep	21 May 2009	10 May 2011	BJD
Agriculture		Pradeep Maharathy; MLA from Pipili	10 May 2011	19 January 2012	BJD
Agriculture		Debiprasad Mishra; MLA from Baramba	2 August 2012	20 May 2014	BJD
Fisheries & Animal Resources Development		Damodar Rout; MLA from Paradeep	21 May 2009	10 May 2011	BJD
Fisheries & Animal Resources Development		Debiprasad Mishra; MLA from Baramba	2 August 2012	20 May 2014	BJD
Co-operation		Damodar Rout; MLA from Paradeep	21 May 2009	10 May 2011	BJD
Co-operation		Prafulla Samal; MLA from Bhandaripokhari	10 May 2011	2 August 2012	BJD
Co-operation		Bikram Keshari Arukha; MLA from Bhanjanagar	2 August 2012	20 May 2014	BJD
Industries		Raghunath Mohanty; MLA from Basta	21 May 2009	2 August 2012	BJD
Industries		Niranjan Pujari; MLA from Sonepur	2 August 2012	20 May 2014	BJD
Steel & Mines		Raghunath Mohanty; MLA from Basta	21 May 2009	2 August 2012	BJD
Housing & Urban Development		Raghunath Mohanty; MLA from Basta	2 August 2012	15 March 2013	BJD
Housing & Urban Development		Debiprasad Mishra; MLA from Baramba	15 March 2013	20 May 2014	BJD
Information Technology		Raghunath Mohanty; MLA from Basta	2 August 2012	15 March 2013	BJD
Parliamentary Affairs		Raghunath Mohanty; MLA from Basta	21 May 2009	2 August 2012	BJD
Parliamentary Affairs		Kalpataru Das; MLA from Dharmasala	2 August 2012	20 May 2014	BJD
Women & Child Development		Pramila Mallik; MLA from Binjharpur	21 May 2009	7 February 2011	BJD
Women & Child Development		Prafulla Samal; MLA from Bhandaripokhari	7 February 2011	10 May 2011	BJD
Women & Child Development		Anjali Behera; MLA from Hindol	10 May 2011	1 June 2012	BJD
Women & Child Development		Usha Devi; MLA from Chikiti	2 August 2012	20 May 2014	BJD
Forest & Environment		Debiprasad Mishra; MLA from Baramba	10 May 2011	2 August 2012	BJD
Forest & Environment		Bijayshree Routray; MLA from Basudevpur	2 August 2012	20 May 2014	BJD
Labour & Employment & State Insurance Portfolios		Bijayshree Routray; MLA from Basudevpur	2 August 2012	20 May 2014	BJD
Higher Education		Debiprasad Mishra; MLA from Baramba	21 May 2009	10 May 2011	BJD
Culture; Tourism		Debiprasad Mishra; MLA from Baramba	21 May 2009	10 May 2011	BJD
Culture; Tourism		Prafulla Samal; MLA from Bhandaripokhari	10 May 2011	2 August 2012	BJD
Culture; Tourism		Maheswar Mohanty; MLA from Puri	2 August 2012	20 May 2014	BJD
Health & Family Welfare		Prasanna Acharya; MLA from Rairakhol	21 May 2009	2 August 2012	BJD
Health & Family Welfare		Damodar Rout; MLA from Paradeep	2 August 2012	20 May 2014	BJD
Micro, Small & Medium Enterprises		Damodar Rout; MLA from Paradeep	2 August 2012	20 May 2014	BJD
Panchayati Raj		Prafulla Samal; MLA from Bhandaripokhari	21 May 2009	10 May 2011	BJD
Panchayati Raj		Maheswar Mohanty; MLA from Puri	10 May 2011	2 August 2012	BJD
Panchayati Raj		Kalpataru Das; MLA from Dharmasala	2 August 2012	20 May 2014	BJD
Information & Public Relations		Prafulla Samal; MLA from Bhandaripokhari	21 May 2009	10 May 2011	BJD
Information & Public Relations		Surjya Narayan Patro; MLA from Digapahandi	10 May 2011	2 August 2012	BJD
S.T. & S.C. Development, Minorities & Backward Classes Welfare		Bijaya Ranjan Singh Bariha; MLA from Padampur	21 May 2009	10 May 2011	BJD
S.T. & S.C. Development, Minorities & Backward Classes Welfare		Lal Bihari Himirika; MLA from Rayagada	10 May 2011	20 May 2014	BJD
Rural Development		Bikram Keshari Arukha; MLA from Bhanjanagar	21 May 2009	20 May 2014	BJD
Law		Bikram Keshari Arukha; MLA from Bhanjanagar	21 May 2009	2 August 2012	BJD
Law		Raghunath Mohanty; MLA from Basta	2 August 2012	15 March 2013	BJD
Law		Maheswar Mohanty; MLA from Puri	15 March 2013	20 May 2014	BJD
Textiles & Handlooms		Usha Devi; MLA from Chikiti	10 May 2011	2 August 2012	BJD
Science & Technology		Usha Devi; MLA from Chikiti	10 May 2011	10 February 2012	BJD
Science & Technology		Niranjan Pujari; MLA from Sonepur	10 February 2012	2 August 2012	BJD
Food Supplies & Consumer Welfare		Niranjan Pujari; MLA from Sonepur	10 May 2011	2 August 2012	BJD
Ministers of State with Independent Charges
Commerce and Transport		Sanjeeb Kumar Sahoo; MLA from Athmallik	21 May 2009	1 June 2012	BJD
Commerce and Transport		Subrat Tarai; MLA from Raghunathpali	2 August 2012	20 May 2014	BJD
Labour & Employement		Puspendra Singh Deo; MLA from Dharmagarh	21 May 2009	2 August 2012	BJD
School & Mass Education		Pratap Jena; MLA from Mahanga	21 May 2009	2 August 2012	BJD
School & Mass Education		Rabi Narayan Nanda; MLA from Jeypore	2 August 2012	20 May 2014	BJD
Energy		Atanu Sabyasachi Nayak; MLA from Mahakalapada	21 May 2009	2 August 2012	BJD
Energy		Arun Kumar Sahoo; MLA from Nayagarh	2 August 2012	20 May 2014	BJD
Information & Public Relations		Arun Kumar Sahoo; MLA from Nayagarh	2 August 2012	20 May 2014	BJD
Sports & Youth Services		Praveen Chandra Bhanj Deo; MLA from Morada	21 May 2009	10 May 2011	BJD
Sports & Youth Services		Badri Narayan Patra; MLA from Ghasipura	10 May 2011	2 August 2012	BJD
Sports & Youth Services		Ramesh Chandra Majhi; MLA from Jharigam	2 August 2012	20 May 2014	BJD
Higher Education		Badri Narayan Patra; MLA from Ghasipura	10 May 2011	20 May 2014	BJD
Housing & Urban Development		Badri Narayan Patra; MLA from Ghasipura	21 May 2009	10 May 2011	BJD
Housing & Urban Development		Sarada Prashad Nayak; MLA from Rourkela	10 May 2011	4 June 2012	BJD
Food Supplies & Consumer Welfare		Sarada Prashad Nayak; MLA from Rourkela	21 May 2009	10 May 2011	BJD
Excise		Sarada Prashad Nayak; MLA from Rourkela	10 February 2012	4 June 2012	BJD
Information Technology		Ramesh Chandra Majhi; MLA from Jharigam	21 May 2009	2 August 2012	BJD
Information Technology		Pratap Keshari Deb; MLA from Aul	15 March 2013	20 May 2014	BJD
Food Supplies & Consumer Welfare		Pratap Keshari Deb; MLA from Aul	2 August 2012	20 May 2014	BJD
Employment & Technical Education & Training		Pratap Keshari Deb; MLA from Aul	2 August 2012	20 May 2014	BJD
Science & Technology		Ramesh Chandra Majhi; MLA from Jharigam	21 May 2009	10 May 2011	BJD
Fisheries & Animal Resources Development		Ramesh Chandra Majhi; MLA from Jharigam	10 May 2011	2 August 2012	BJD
Public Grievances & Pension Administration; Science & Technology		Ramesh Chandra Majhi; MLA from Jharigam	2 August 2012	20 May 2014	BJD
Textiles & Handlooms		Anjali Behera; MLA from Hindol	21 May 2009	10 May 2011	BJD
Textiles & Handlooms		Sarojini Hembram; MLA from Bangriposi	2 August 2012	20 May 2014	BJD
Steel & Mines		Rajanikant Singh; MLA from Angul	2 August 2012	20 May 2014	BJD
Ministers of State
Revenue & Disaster Management		Praveen Chandra Bhanj Deo; MLA from Morada	21 May 2009	10 May 2011	BJD
Minor Irrigation		Puspendra Singh Deo; MLA from Dharmagarh	10 May 2011	2 August 2012	BJD
Tribal Welfare		Ramesh Chandra Majhi; MLA from Jharigam	10 May 2011	2 August 2012	BJD

== Members of Legislative Assembly ==
Source
District	AC. No.	Constituency	Member	Party	Remarks
Bargarh	1	Padampur	Bijaya Ranjan Singh Bariha	Biju Janata Dal	Cabinet Minister
Bargarh	2	Bijepur	Subal Sahu	Indian National Congress	
Bargarh	3	Bargarh	Sadhu Nepak	Indian National Congress	
Bargarh	4	Attabira (SC)	Nihar Ranjan Mahanand	Indian National Congress	
Bargarh	5	Bhatli	Susanta Singh	Biju Janata Dal	
Jharsuguda	6	Brajarajnagar	Anup Kumar Sai	Indian National Congress	
Jharsuguda	7	Jharsuguda	Naba Kishore Das	Indian National Congress	
Sundergarh	8	Talsara (ST)	Prafulla Majhi	Indian National Congress	
Sundergarh	9	Sundargarh (ST)	Jogesh Kumar Singh	Indian National Congress	
Sundergarh	10	Biramitrapur (ST)	George Tirkey	Independent	
Sundergarh	11	Raghunathpali (SC)	Subrat Tarai	Biju Janata Dal	Minister of State (I/C)
Sundergarh	12	Rourkela	Sarada Prasad Nayak	Biju Janata Dal	Minister of State (I/C)
Sundergarh	13	Rajgangapur (ST)	Gregory Minz	Indian National Congress	
Sundergarh	14	Bonai (ST)	Bhimsen Choudhury	Bharatiya Janata Party	
Sambalpur	15	Kuchinda (ST)	Rajendra Kumar Chhatria	Indian National Congress	
Sambalpur	16	Rengali (SC)	Duryodhan Gardia	Indian National Congress	
Sambalpur	17	Sambalpur	Jayanarayan Mishra	Bharatiya Janata Party	
Sambalpur	18	Rairakhol	Prasanna Acharya	Biju Janata Dal	Cabinet Minister
Deogarh	19	Deogarh	Sanjeeb Kumar Pradhan	Biju Janata Dal	
Keonjhar	20	Telkoi (ST)	Premananda Nayak	Biju Janata Dal	
Keonjhar	21	Ghasipura	Badri Narayan Patra	Biju Janata Dal	Minister of State (I/C)
Keonjhar	22	Anandapur (SC)	Bhagirathi Sethy	Biju Janata Dal	
Keonjhar	23	Patna (ST)	Hrushikesh Naik	Biju Janata Dal	
Keonjhar	24	Keonjhar (ST)	Subarna Naik	Biju Janata Dal	
Keonjhar	25	Champua	Jitu Patnaik	Independent	
Mayurbhanj	26	Jashipur (ST)	Kamala Kanta Nayak	Biju Janata Dal	
Mayurbhanj	27	Saraskana (ST)	Rama Chandra Hansdah	Nationalist Congress Party	Party Merged with BJD on 5 June 2012.
Mayurbhanj	27	Saraskana (ST)	Rama Chandra Hansdah	Biju Janata Dal	
Mayurbhanj	28	Rairangpur (ST)	Shyam Charan Hansdah	Indian National Congress	
Mayurbhanj	29	Bangriposi (ST)	Sarojini Hembram	Biju Janata Dal	Minister of State (I/C)
Mayurbhanj	30	Karanjia (ST)	Bijay Kumar Naik	Biju Janata Dal	
Mayurbhanj	31	Udala (ST)	Shrinath Soren	Biju Janata Dal	
Mayurbhanj	32	Badasahi (SC)	Manoranjan Sethi	Biju Janata Dal	
Mayurbhanj	33	Baripada (ST)	Sananda Marndi	Biju Janata Dal	Deputy Speaker
Mayurbhanj	34	Morada	Praveen Chandra Bhanjdeo	Biju Janata Dal	Minister of State (I/C)
Balasore	35	Jaleswar	Debi Prasanna Chand	Indian National Congress	
Balasore	36	Bhograi	Ananta Das	Biju Janata Dal	
Balasore	37	Basta	Raghunath Mohanty	Biju Janata Dal	Cabinet Minister
Balasore	38	Balasore	Jiban Pradip Dash	Biju Janata Dal	
Balasore	39	Remuna (SC)	Sudarshan Jena	Biju Janata Dal	
Balasore	40	Nilgiri	Pratap Chandra Sarangi	Independent	
Balasore	41	Soro (SC)	Surendra Prasad Pramanik	Indian National Congress	
Balasore	42	Simulia	Parsuram Panigrahi	Biju Janata Dal	
Bhadrak	43	Bhandaripokhari	Prafulla Samal	Biju Janata Dal	Cabinet Minister
Bhadrak	44	Bhadrak	Jugal Kishore Pattnaik	Biju Janata Dal	
Bhadrak	45	Basudevpur	Bijayshree Routray	Biju Janata Dal	Cabinet Minister
Bhadrak	46	Dhamnagar (SC)	Rajendra Kumar Das	Biju Janata Dal	
Bhadrak	47	Chandabali	Bijaya Nayak	Biju Janata Dal	
Jajpur	48	Binjharpur (SC)	Pramila Mallik	Biju Janata Dal	Cabinet Minister
Jajpur	49	Bari	Debasis Nayak	Biju Janata Dal	
Jajpur	50	Barchana	Amar Prasad Satpathy	Nationalist Congress Party	Party Merged with BJD on 5 June 2012.
Jajpur	50	Barchana	Amar Prasad Satpathy	Biju Janata Dal	
Jajpur	51	Dharmasala	Kalpataru Das	Biju Janata Dal	Cabinet Minister
Jajpur	52	Jajpur	Pranab Prakash Das	Biju Janata Dal	
Jajpur	53	Korei	Pritiranjan Gharai	Biju Janata Dal	
Jajpur	54	Sukinda	Prafulla Chandra Ghadai	Biju Janata Dal	Cabinet Minister
Dhenkanal	55	Dhenkanal	Nabin Nanda	Nationalist Congress Party	Party Merged with BJD on 5 June 2012.
Dhenkanal	55	Dhenkanal	Nabin Nanda	Biju Janata Dal	
Dhenkanal	56	Hindol (SC)	Anjali Behera	Biju Janata Dal	Cabinet Minister
Dhenkanal	57	Kamakhyanagar	Prafulla Kumar Mallik	Biju Janata Dal	
Dhenkanal	58	Parjanga	Nrusingha Charan Sahu	Biju Janata Dal	
Angul	59	Pallahara	Rabi Narayan Pani	Biju Janata Dal	Govt. Chief Whip
Angul	60	Talcher	Braja Kishore Pradhan	Independent	
Angul	61	Angul	Rajanikant Singh	Biju Janata Dal	Minister of State (I/C)
Angul	62	Chhendipada (SC)	Khageswar Behera	Biju Janata Dal	
Angul	63	Athmallik	Sanjeeb Kumar Sahoo	Biju Janata Dal	Minister of State (I/C)
Subarnapur	64	Birmaharajpur	Padmanabha Behera	Biju Janata Dal	
Subarnapur	65	Sonepur	Niranjan Pujari	Biju Janata Dal	Cabinet Minister
Balangir	66	Loisingha (SC)	Ramakanta Seth	Biju Janata Dal	
Balangir	67	Patnagarh	Kanak Vardhan Singh Deo	Bharatiya Janata Party	
Balangir	68	Bolangir	Ananga Udaya Singh Deo	Biju Janata Dal	Cabinet Minister
Balangir	69	Titlagarh	Surendra Singh Bhoi	Indian National Congress	
Balangir	70	Kantabanji	Santosh Singh Saluja	Indian National Congress	
Nuapada	71	Nuapada	Rajendra Dholakia	Biju Janata Dal	
Nuapada	72	Khariar	Hitesh Kumar Bagartti	Bharatiya Janata Party	
Nabarangpur	73	Umerkote (ST)	Jagabandhu Majhi	Biju Janata Dal	Killed in September 2011.
Nabarangpur	73	Umerkote (ST)	Subash Gond	Biju Janata Dal	Won in 2011 Bypoll.
Nabarangpur	74	Jharigam (ST)	Ramesh Chandra Majhi	Biju Janata Dal	Minister of State (I/C)
Nabarangpur	75	Nabarangpur (ST)	Manohar Randhari	Biju Janata Dal	
Nabarangpur	76	Dabugam (ST)	Bhujabal Majhi	Indian National Congress	
Kalahandi	77	Lanjigarh (ST)	Shibaji Majhi	Indian National Congress	
Kalahandi	78	Junagarh	Gobardhan Dash	Indian National Congress	
Kalahandi	79	Dharmagarh	Puspendra Singh Deo	Biju Janata Dal	Minister of State (I/C)
Kalahandi	80	Bhawanipatna (SC)	Dusmanta Naik	Indian National Congress	
Kalahandi	81	Narla	Bhupinder Singh	Indian National Congress	Leader of Opposition, Resigned on 10 March 2014.
Kalahandi	81	Narla	Vacant (since 10 March 2014)		
Kandhamal	82	Baliguda (ST)	Karendra Majhi	Bharatiya Janata Party	
Kandhamal	83	G. Udayagiri (ST)	Manoj Kumar Pradhan	Bharatiya Janata Party	
Kandhamal	84	Phulbani (ST)	Debendra Kanhar	Biju Janata Dal	
Boudh	85	Kantamal	Bhagban Kanhor	Biju Janata Dal	
Boudh	86	Boudh	Pradip Kumar Amat	Biju Janata Dal	Speaker
Cuttack	87	Baramba	Debiprasad Mishra	Biju Janata Dal	Cabinet Minister
Cuttack	88	Banki	Pravata Kumar Tripathy	Biju Janata Dal	Govt. Chief Whip
Cuttack	89	Athagarh	Ramesh Rout	Independent	Election declared void by Supreme Court.
Cuttack	89	Athagarh	Ranendra Pratap Swain	Biju Janata Dal	Won in 2012 Bypoll.
Cuttack	90	Barabati-Cuttack	Debashish Samantaray	Biju Janata Dal	
Cuttack	91	Choudwar-Cuttack	Pravat Ranjan Biswal	Biju Janata Dal	
Cuttack	92	Niali (SC)	Pramod Kumar Mallick	Biju Janata Dal	
Cuttack	93	Cuttack Sadar (SC)	Kalindi Behera	Biju Janata Dal	
Cuttack	94	Salipur	Chandra Sarathi Behera	Biju Janata Dal	
Cuttack	95	Mahanga	Pratap Jena	Biju Janata Dal	Minister of State (I/C)
Kendrapara	96	Patkura	Bed Prakash Agrawal	Biju Janata Dal	
Kendrapara	97	Kendrapara (SC)	Sipra Mallick	Biju Janata Dal	
Kendrapara	98	Aul	Pratap Keshari Deb	Biju Janata Dal	Minister of State (I/C)
Kendrapara	99	Rajanagar	Alekh Kumar Jena	Biju Janata Dal	
Kendrapara	100	Mahakalapada	Atanu Sabyasachi Nayak	Biju Janata Dal	Minister of State (I/C)
Jagatsinghpur	101	Paradeep	Damodar Rout	Biju Janata Dal	Cabinet Minister
Jagatsinghpur	102	Tirtol (SC)	Rabindra Nath Bhoi	Biju Janata Dal	
Jagatsinghpur	103	Balikuda-ersama	Prasanta Kumar Muduli	Biju Janata Dal	
Jagatsinghpur	104	Jagatsinghpur	Bishnu Charan Das	Biju Janata Dal	
Puri	105	Kakatpur (SC)	Rabi Mallick	Biju Janata Dal	
Puri	106	Nimapara	Samir Ranjan Dash	Biju Janata Dal	
Puri	107	Puri	Maheswar Mohanty	Biju Janata Dal	Cabinet Minister
Puri	108	Bramhagiri	Sanjay Kumar Das Burma	Biju Janata Dal	
Puri	109	Satyabadi	Prasad Kumar Harichandan	Indian National Congress	Cong. Chief Whip
Puri	110	Pipili	Pradeep Maharathy	Biju Janata Dal	Cabinet Minister
Khordha	111	Jayadev (SC)	Arabinda Dhali	Biju Janata Dal	
Khordha	112	Bhubaneswar Central	Bijaya Kumar Mohanty	Biju Janata Dal	
Khordha	113	Bhubaneswar North	Bhagirathi Badajena	Biju Janata Dal	
Khordha	114	Ekamra-Bhubaneswar	Ashok Chandra Panda	Biju Janata Dal	
Khordha	115	Jatani	Bibhuti Bhusan Balabantaray	Biju Janata Dal	
Khordha	116	Begunia	Prashanta Nanda	Nationalist Congress Party	Party Merged with BJD on 5 June 2012.
Khordha	116	Begunia	Prashanta Nanda	Biju Janata Dal	
Khordha	117	Khurda	Rajendra Kumar Sahoo	Independent	
Khordha	118	Chilika	Raghunath Sahu	Biju Janata Dal	
Nayagarh	119	Ranpur	Satyanarayan Pradhan	Biju Janata Dal	
Nayagarh	120	Khandapada	Siddharth Sekhar Singh	Biju Janata Dal	
Nayagarh	121	Daspalla (SC)	Kashinath Mallik	Biju Janata Dal	
Nayagarh	122	Nayagarh	Arun Kumar Sahoo	Biju Janata Dal	Minister of State (I/C)
Ganjam	123	Bhanjanagar	Bikram Keshari Arukha	Biju Janata Dal	Cabinet Minister
Ganjam	124	Polasara	Niranjan Pradhan	Biju Janata Dal	
Ganjam	125	Kabisuryangar	V. Sugnana Kumari Deo	Biju Janata Dal	
Ganjam	126	Khalikote (SC)	Purna Chandra Sethy	Biju Janata Dal	
Ganjam	127	Chhatrapur (SC)	Adikanda Sethi	Communist Party of India	
Ganjam	128	Aska	Debaraj Mohanty	Biju Janata Dal	
Ganjam	129	Surada	Purna Chandra Swain	Biju Janata Dal	
Ganjam	130	Sanakhemundi	Ramesh Chandra Jena	Indian National Congress	
Ganjam	131	Hinjili	Naveen Patnaik	Biju Janata Dal	Chief Minister
Ganjam	132	Gopalpur	Pradeep Kumar Panigrahy	Biju Janata Dal	
Ganjam	133	Berhampur	Ramesh Chandra Chyau Patnaik	Biju Janata Dal	
Ganjam	134	Digapahandi	Surjya Narayan Patro	Biju Janata Dal	Cabinet Minister
Ganjam	135	Chikiti	Usha Devi	Biju Janata Dal	Cabinet Minister
Gajapati	136	Mohana (ST)	Chakradhara Paik	Indian National Congress	
Gajapati	137	Paralakhemundi	K. Narayana Rao	Biju Janata Dal	
Rayagada	138	Gunupur (ST)	Ramamurty Mutika	Biju Janata Dal	
Rayagada	139	Bissam Cuttack (ST)	Damburudhara Ulaka	Indian National Congress	
Rayagada	140	Rayagada (ST)	Lal Bihari Himirika	Biju Janata Dal	Cabinet Minister
Koraput	141	Laxmipur (ST)	Jhina Hikaka	Biju Janata Dal	
Koraput	142	Kotpad (ST)	Basudev Majhi	Indian National Congress	
Koraput	143	Jeypore	Rabi Narayan Nanda	Biju Janata Dal	Minister of State (I/C)
Koraput	144	Koraput (SC)	Raghu Ram Padal	Biju Janata Dal	
Koraput	145	Pottangi (ST)	Rama Chandra Kadam	Indian National Congress	
Malkangiri	146	Malkangiri (ST)	Mukunda Sodi	Biju Janata Dal	
Malkangiri	147	Chitrakonda (ST)	Mamta Madhi	Indian National Congress	

== Bypolls ==
Source
Year	Constituency	Reason for by-poll	Winning candidate	Party
November 2011	Umerkote (ST)	Assassination of Jagabandhu Majhi	Subash Gond	Biju Janata Dal
March 2012	Athagarh	Election declared void by Supreme Court	Ranendra Pratap Swain	Biju Janata Dal
