= 15th Odisha Legislative Assembly =

15th state legislature of the Indian state of Odisha

←	14th Assembly	16th Assembly	→
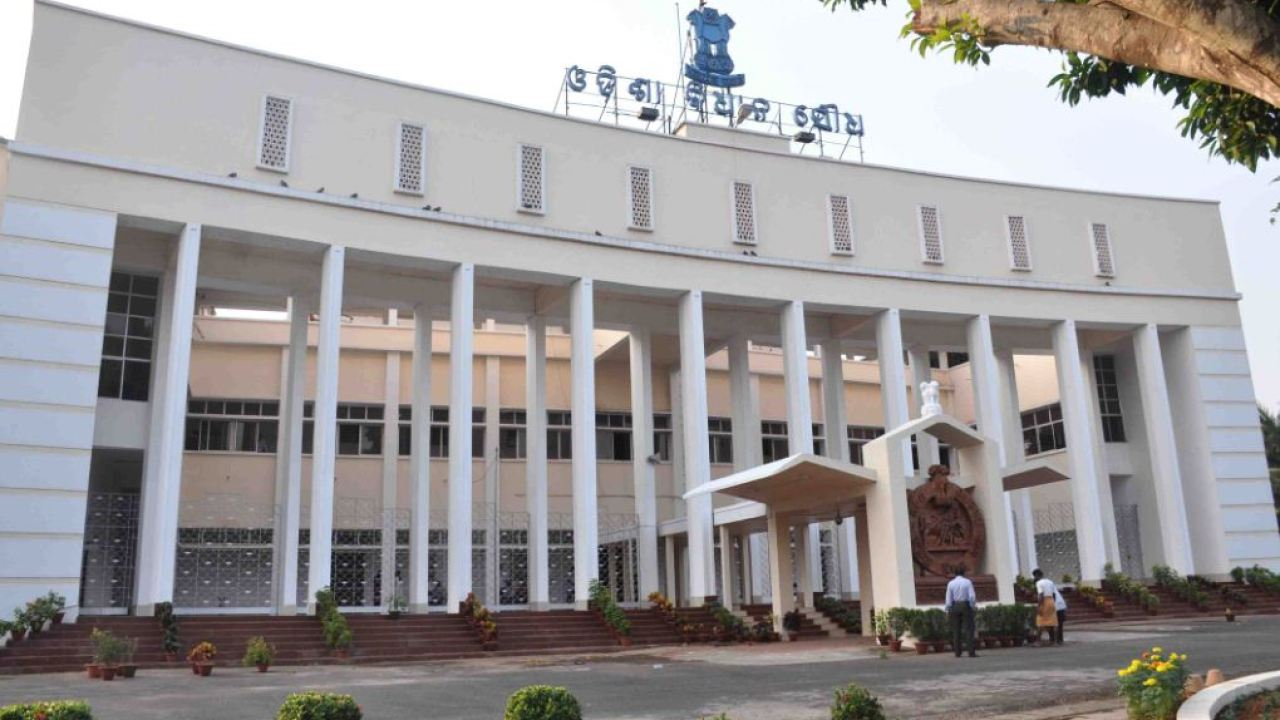
- Front view of Odisha Vidhan Saudha, Bhubaneshwar (2010)

Overview
- Meeting place: Odisha Vidhan Saudha, Bhubaneshwar, Odisha, India
- Term: 19 May 2014 – 25 May 2019
- Election: 2014 Odisha Legislative Assembly election
- Government: Biju Janata Dal
- Opposition: Indian National Congress
- Website: assembly.odisha.gov.in

Odisha Legislative Assembly
- House Composition as assembly begins
- Members: 147
- Governor: S. C. Jamir; Satya Pal Malik (Additional Charge); Ganeshi Lal
- Speaker: Niranjan Pujari, BJD; Pradip Kumar Amat, BJD
- Deputy Speaker: Sananda Marndi, BJD
- Leader of the House (Chief Minister): Naveen Patnaik, BJD
- Leader of Opposition: Narasingha Mishra, INC
- Party control: BJD (117/147)
- 17 Sessions with 226 Sittings

The Fifteenth Odisha Legislative Assembly was convened on after 2014 Odisha Legislative Assembly election. Biju Janata Dal led by Naveen Patnaik formed government for a record 4th time.

== Brief history ==
Following BJD's victory in 2014 election, Chief Minister Naveen Patnaik along with his council of ministers were sworn in by Governor S. C. Jamir on 21 May 2014. Cabinet reshuffle took place on 8 May 2017 & 5 February 2018. After securing a historic fifth term by winning 2019 Odisha Assembly election, Shri Patnaik resigned on 28 May 2019.

== House composition ==
Party	Strength	
Party	Assembly Begins	Assembly Dissolves
Biju Janata Dal	117	112
Indian National Congress	16	11
Bharatiya Janata Party	10	9
Communist Party of India (Marxist)	1	1
Samata Kranti Dal	1	0
Independent	2	2
Vacant	-	12

== Office bearers ==
Post	Portrait	Name	Tenure		Party
Governor		S. C. Jamir	Assembly Begins	20 March 2018	N/A
Governor		Satya Pal Malik (Additional Charge)	21 March 2018	28 May 2018	N/A
Governor		Ganeshi Lal	29 May 2018	Assembly Dissolves	N/A
Speaker		Niranjan Pujari; MLA from Sonepur	26 May 2014	6 May 2017	Biju Janata Dal
Speaker		Pradip Kumar Amat; MLA from Boudh	16 May 2017	31 May 2019	Biju Janata Dal
Deputy Speaker		Sananda Marndi; MLA from Baripada	16 June 2014	30 May 2019	Biju Janata Dal
Leader of the House (Chief Minister); Leader of BJD Legislature Party		Naveen Patnaik; MLA from Hinjili	21 May 2014	28 May 2019	Biju Janata Dal
Minister for Parliamentary Affairs		Bikram Keshari Arukha; MLA from Bhanjanagar	20 May 2014	28 May 2019	Biju Janata Dal
Leader of Opposition; Leader of Congress Legislature Party		Narasingha Mishra; MLA from Bolangir	11 June 2014	29 May 2019	Indian National Congress
Pro tem Speaker		V. Sugnana Kumari Deo; MLA from Kabisuryanagar	22 May 2014	24 May 2014	Biju Janata Dal

== Council of Ministers ==
Source
Portfolio	Portrait	Name Constituency	Tenure		Party
Chief Minister; Home; General Administration; Other departments not allocated to any Minister.		Naveen Patnaik; MLA from Hinjili	20 May 2014	28 May 2019	BJD
Water Resources; Works		Naveen Patnaik; MLA from Hinjili	20 May 2014	3 March 2018	BJD
Public Grievances & Pension Administration		Naveen Patnaik; MLA from Hinjili	7 May 2017	28 May 2019	BJD
Cabinet Minister
Finance		Pradip Kumar Amat; MLA from Boudh	20 May 2014	7 May 2017	BJD
Finance		Shashi Bhusan Behera; MLA from Kendrapara	7 May 2017	28 May 2019	BJD
Public Enterprises		Pradip Kumar Amat; MLA from Boudh	20 May 2014	7 May 2017	BJD
Public Enterprises		Damodar Rout; MLA from Paradeep	7 May 2017	22 December 2017	BJD
Public Enterprises		Shashi Bhusan Behera; MLA from Kendrapara	22 December 2017	3 March 2018	BJD
Public Enterprises		Bikram Keshari Arukha; MLA from Bhanjanagar	3 March 2018	28 May 2019	BJD
Health & Family Welfare		Pradip Kumar Amat; MLA from Boudh	21 October 2016	7 May 2017	BJD
Health & Family Welfare		Pratap Jena; MLA from Mahanga	7 May 2017	28 May 2019	BJD
Law		Pratap Jena; MLA from Mahanga	7 May 2017	28 May 2019	BJD
Excise		Damodar Rout; MLA from Paradeep	20 May 2014	7 May 2017	BJD
Excise		Shashi Bhusan Behera; MLA from Kendrapara	7 May 2017	28 May 2019	BJD
Co-operation		Damodar Rout; MLA from Paradeep	20 May 2014	7 May 2017	BJD
Co-operation		Surjya Narayan Patro; MLA from Digapahandi	7 May 2017	28 May 2019	BJD
Food Supplies & Consumer Welfare		Surjya Narayan Patro; MLA from Digapahandi	7 May 2017	28 May 2019	BJD
Industries		Debi Prasad Mishra; MLA from Baramba	20 May 2014	7 May 2017	BJD
Industries		Niranjan Pujari; MLA from Sonepur	7 May 2017	3 March 2018	BJD
School & Mass Education		Debi Prasad Mishra; MLA from Baramba	20 May 2014	7 May 2017	BJD
School & Mass Education		Badri Narayan Patra; MLA from Ghasipura	7 May 2017	28 May 2019	BJD
Science & Technology		Badri Narayan Patra; MLA from Ghasipura	7 May 2017	28 May 2019	BJD
Agriculture		Pradeep Maharathy; MLA from Pipili	20 May 2014	7 May 2017	BJD
Agriculture & Farmer Empowerment		Damodar Rout; MLA from Paradeep	7 May 2017	22 December 2017	BJD
Agriculture & Farmer Empowerment		Pradeep Maharathy; MLA from Pipili	22 December 2017	6 January 2019	BJD
Agriculture & Farmer Empowerment		Shashi Bhusan Behera; MLA from Kendrapara	6 January 2019	28 May 2019	BJD
Fisheries & Animal Resources Development		Pradeep Maharathy; MLA from Pipili	20 May 2014	7 May 2017	BJD
Fisheries & Animal Resources Development		Damodar Rout; MLA from Paradeep	7 May 2017	22 December 2017	BJD
Fisheries & Animal Resources Development		Pradeep Maharathy; MLA from Pipili	22 December 2017	6 January 2019	BJD
Fisheries & Animal Resources Development		Shashi Bhusan Behera; MLA from Kendrapara	6 January 2019	28 May 2019	BJD
Panchayati Raj & Drinking Water		Pradeep Maharathy; MLA from Pipili	7 May 2017	6 January 2019	BJD
Panchayati Raj & Drinking Water		Ramesh Chandra Majhi; MLA from Jharigam	6 January 2019	28 May 2019	BJD
Revenue & Disaster Management		Bijayshree Routray; MLA from Basudevpur	20 May 2014	7 May 2017	BJD
Revenue & Disaster Management		Maheswar Mohanty; MLA from Puri	7 May 2017	28 May 2019	BJD
Parliamentary Affairs		Bikram Keshari Arukha; MLA from Bhanjanagar	20 May 2014	28 May 2019	BJD
Forest & Environment		Bikram Keshari Arukha; MLA from Bhanjanagar	20 May 2014	7 May 2017	BJD
Forest & Environment		Bijayshree Routray; MLA from Basudevpur	7 May 2017	28 May 2019	BJD
Rural Development		Badri Narayan Patra; MLA from Ghasipura	20 May 2014	7 May 2017	BJD
Rural Development		Bikram Keshari Arukha; MLA from Bhanjanagar	7 May 2017	28 May 2019	BJD
Information & Public Relations		Bikram Keshari Arukha; MLA from Bhanjanagar	21 October 2016	3 March 2018	BJD
Information & Public Relations		Pratap Jena; MLA from Mahanga	3 March 2018	28 May 2019	BJD
Women & Child Development		Usha Devi; MLA from Chikiti	20 May 2014	7 May 2017	BJD
Women & Child Development		Prafulla Samal; MLA from Bhandaripokhari	7 May 2017	28 May 2019	BJD
Mission Shakti		Prafulla Samal; MLA from Bhandaripokhari	7 May 2017	28 May 2019	BJD
Planning & Convergence		Usha Devi; MLA from Chikiti	20 May 2014	28 May 2019	BJD
Skill Development & Technical Education		Usha Devi; MLA from Chikiti	7 May 2017	28 May 2019	BJD
Social Security & Empowerment of Persons with Disability		Usha Devi; MLA from Chikiti	27 May 2015	7 May 2017	BJD
Social Security & Empowerment of Persons with Disability		Prafulla Samal; MLA from Bhandaripokhari	7 May 2017	28 May 2019	BJD
S.T. & S.C. Development, Minorities & Backward Classes Welfare		Lal Bihari Himirika; MLA from Rayagada	20 May 2014	7 May 2017	BJD
S.T. & S.C. Development, Minorities & Backward Classes Welfare		Ramesh Chandra Majhi; MLA from Jharigam	7 May 2017	28 May 2019	BJD
Micro, Small & Medium Enterprises		Jogendra Behera; MLA from Loisingha	20 May 2014	7 May 2017	BJD
Micro, Small & Medium Enterprises		Prafulla Samal; MLA from Bhandaripokhari	7 May 2017	28 May 2019	BJD
Public Grievances & Pension Administration		Jogendra Behera; MLA from Loisingha	20 May 2014	7 May 2017	BJD
Housing & Urban Development		Puspendra Singh Deo; MLA from Dharmagarh	20 May 2014	7 May 2017	BJD
Housing & Urban Development		Niranjan Pujari; MLA from Sonepur	7 May 2017	28 May 2019	BJD
Water Resources		Niranjan Pujari; MLA from Sonepur	3 March 2018	28 May 2019	BJD
Energy		Prafulla Kumar Mallik; MLA from Kamakshyanagar	7 May 2017	3 March 2018	BJD
Steel & Mines		Prafulla Kumar Mallik; MLA from Kamakshyanagar	7 May 2017	28 May 2019	BJD
Works		Prafulla Kumar Mallik; MLA from Kamakshyanagar	3 March 2018	28 May 2019	BJD
Ministers of State with Independent Charges
Culture; Tourism		Ashok Chandra Panda; MLA from Ekamra Bhubaneswar	20 May 2014	28 May 2019	BJD
Handlooms, Textiles & Handicrafts		Snehangini Chhuria; MLA from Attabira	20 May 2014	28 May 2019	BJD
Steel & Mines		Prafulla Kumar Mallik; MLA from Kamakshyanagar	20 May 2014	7 May 2017	BJD
Labour & Employees' State Insurance		Prafulla Kumar Mallik; MLA from Kamakshyanagar	20 May 2014	7 May 2017	BJD
Labour & Employees' State Insurance		Susanta Singh; MLA from Bhatli	7 May 2017	28 May 2019	BJD
Commerce and Transport		Ramesh Chandra Majhi; MLA from Jharigam	20 May 2014	7 May 2017	BJD
Commerce and Transport		Nrushingha Charan Sahu; MLA from Parjanga	7 May 2017	28 May 2019	BJD
Health & Family Welfare; Information & Public Relations		Atanu Sabyasachi Nayak; MLA from Mahakalapada	20 May 2014	21 October 2016	BJD
Panchayati Raj; Law		Arun Kumar Sahoo MLA from Nayagarh	20 May 2014	7 May 2017	BJD
Food Supplies & Consumer Welfare; Employment & Technical Education & Training		Sanjay Kumar Das Burma; MLA from Brahmagiri	20 May 2014	7 May 2017	BJD
Sports & Youth Services		Sudam Marndi; MLA from Bangriposi	20 May 2014	7 May 2017	BJD
Sports & Youth Services		Chandra Sarathi Behera; MLA from Cuttack Sadar	7 May 2017	28 May 2019	BJD
Information Technology		Pranab Prakash Das; MLA from Jajpur	20 May 2014	7 May 2017	BJD
Electronics & Information Technology		Chandra Sarathi Behera; MLA from Cuttack Sadar	7 May 2017	28 May 2019	BJD
Energy		Pranab Prakash Das; MLA from Jajpur	20 May 2014	7 May 2017	BJD
Energy		Susanta Singh; MLA from Bhatli	3 March 2018	28 May 2019	BJD
Science & Technology		Pradeep Kumar Panigrahy; MLA from Gopalpur	20 May 2014	7 May 2017	BJD
Higher Education		Pradeep Kumar Panigrahy; MLA from Gopalpur	20 May 2014	7 May 2017	BJD
Higher Education		Ananta Das; MLA from Bhograi	7 May 2017	28 May 2019	BJD
Industries		Ananta Das; MLA from Bhograi	3 March 2018	28 May 2019	BJD
Ministers of State
Tribal welfare		Sudam Marndi; MLA from Bangriposi	20 May 2014	7 May 2017	BJD
SC welfare; Mission Shakti		Snehangini Chhuria; MLA from Attabira	20 May 2014	7 May 2017	BJD
Rural Water Supply		Pradeep Kumar Panigrahy; MLA from Gopalpur	20 May 2014	7 May 2017	BJD
Disability Welfare		Pranab Prakash Das; MLA from Jajpur	20 May 2014	7 May 2017	BJD

== Members of Legislative Assembly ==
Source
District	A.C. No.	Constituency	Name	Party	Remarks
Bargarh	1	Padampur	Pradip Purohit	Bharatiya Janata Party	
Bargarh	2	Bijepur	Subal Sahu	Indian National Congress	Died on 22 August 2017.
Bargarh	2	Bijepur	Rita Sahu	Biju Janata Dal	Won in 2018 Bypoll.
Bargarh	3	Bargarh	Debesh Acharya	Biju Janata Dal	
Bargarh	4	Attabira (SC)	Snehangini Chhuria	Biju Janata Dal	Cabinet Minister
Bargarh	5	Bhatli	Susanta Singh	Biju Janata Dal	Cabinet Minister
Jharsuguda	6	Brajarajnagar	Radharani Panda	Bharatiya Janata Party	
Jharsuguda	7	Jharsuguda	Naba Kishore Das	Indian National Congress	Resigned on 28 January 2019
Jharsuguda	7	Jharsuguda	Vacant (since 28 January 2019)		
Sundergarh	8	Talsara (ST)	Prafulla Majhi	Indian National Congress	
Sundergarh	9	Sundargarh (ST)	Jogesh Kumar Singh	Indian National Congress	Resigned on 22 January 2019
Sundergarh	9	Sundargarh (ST)	Vacant (since 22 January 2019)		
Sundergarh	10	Biramitrapur (ST)	George Tirkey	Samata Kranti Dal	Merged with Congress Party on 2 November 2018.
Sundergarh	10	Biramitrapur (ST)	George Tirkey	Indian National Congress	
Sundergarh	11	Raghunathapali (SC)	Subrat Tarai	Biju Janata Dal	
Sundergarh	12	Rourkela	Dilip Ray	Bharatiya Janata Party	Resigned on 30 November 2018
Sundergarh	12	Rourkela	Vacant (since 30 November 2018)		
Sundergarh	13	Rajgangpur (ST)	Mangala Kisan	Biju Janata Dal	
Sundergarh	14	Bonai (ST)	Laxman Munda	Communist Party of India (Marxist)	
Sambalpur	15	Kuchinda (ST)	Rabi Narayan Naik	Bharatiya Janata Party	
Sambalpur	16	Rengali (SC)	Ramesh Patua	Biju Janata Dal	
Sambalpur	17	Sambalpur	Raseswari Panigrahi	Biju Janata Dal	
Sambalpur	18	Rairakhol	Rohit Pujari	Biju Janata Dal	Deputy Govt. Chief Whip
Deogarh	19	Deogarh	Nitesh Ganga Deb	Bharatiya Janata Party	
Keonjhar	20	Telkoi (ST)	Bedabyasa Nayak	Biju Janata Dal	
Keonjhar	21	Ghasipura	Badri Narayan Patra	Biju Janata Dal	Cabinet Minister
Keonjhar	22	Anandapur (SC)	Mayadhar Jena	Biju Janata Dal	
Keonjhar	23	Patna (ST)	Hrushikesh Naik	Biju Janata Dal	
Keonjhar	24	Keonjhar (ST)	Abhiram Naik	Biju Janata Dal	
Keonjhar	25	Champua	Sanatan Mahakud	Independent	
Mayurbhanj	26	Jashipur (ST)	Mangal Singh Mudi	Biju Janata Dal	
Mayurbhanj	27	Saraskana (ST)	Bhadav Hansdah	Biju Janata Dal	
Mayurbhanj	28	Rairangpur (ST)	Sushil Kumar Hansdah	Biju Janata Dal	
Mayurbhanj	29	Bangiriposi (ST)	Sudam Marndi	Biju Janata Dal	Minister of State (I/C)
Mayurbhanj	30	Karanjia (ST)	Bijay Kumar Naik	Biju Janata Dal	
Mayurbhanj	31	Udala (ST)	Golakabihari Naik	Biju Janata Dal	
Mayurbhanj	32	Badasahi (SC)	Ganeswar Patra	Biju Janata Dal	
Mayurbhanj	33	Baripada (ST)	Sananda Marndi	Biju Janata Dal	Deputy Speaker
Mayurbhanj	34	Moroda	Prabin Chandra Bhanjadeo	Biju Janata Dal	
Balasore	35	Jaleswar	Aswini Kumar Patra	Biju Janata Dal	
Balasore	36	Bhograi	Ananta Das	Biju Janata Dal	Minister of State (I/C)
Balasore	37	Basta	Nityananda Sahoo	Biju Janata Dal	
Balasore	38	Balasore	Jiban Pratap Dash	Biju Janata Dal	
Balasore	39	Remuna	Gobinda Chandra Das	Bharatiya Janata Party	
Balasore	40	Nilagiri	Sukanta Nayak	Biju Janata Dal	Disqualified on 6 April 2019
Balasore	40	Nilagiri	Vacant (since 6 April 2019)		
Balasore	41	Soro (SC)	Parshu Ram Dhada	Biju Janata Dal	
Balasore	42	Simulia	Jyoti Prakash Panigrahi	Biju Janata Dal	
Bhadrak	43	Bhandaripokhari	Prafulla Samal	Biju Janata Dal	Cabinet Minister
Bhadrak	44	Bhadrak	Jugal Kishore Patnaik	Biju Janata Dal	
Bhadrak	45	Basudevpur	Bijayshree Routray	Biju Janata Dal	Cabinet Minister
Bhadrak	46	Dhamnagar (SC)	Muktikanta Mandal	Biju Janata Dal	
Bhadrak	47	Chandabali	Byomakesh Ray	Biju Janata Dal	
Jajpur	48	Binjharpur (SC)	Pramila Mallik	Biju Janata Dal	
Jajpur	49	Bari	Debasis Nayak	Biju Janata Dal	
Jajpur	50	Barchana	Amar Prasad Satpathy	Biju Janata Dal	Govt. Chief Whip
Jajpur	51	Dharmasala	Pranab Kumar Balabantaray	Biju Janata Dal	
Jajpur	52	Jajpur	Pranab Prakash Das	Biju Janata Dal	Minister of State (I/C)
Jajpur	53	Korei	Akash Dasnayak	Biju Janata Dal	
Jajpur	54	Sukinda	Pritiranjan Gharai	Biju Janata Dal	
Dhenkanal	55	Dhenkanal	Sudhir Kumar Samal	Biju Janata Dal	
Dhenkanal	56	Hindol (SC)	Simarani Nayak	Biju Janata Dal	
Dhenkanal	57	Kamakhyanagar	Prafulla Kumar Mallik	Biju Janata Dal	Cabinet Minister
Dhenkanal	58	Parjanga	Nrusingha Charan Sahu	Biju Janata Dal	Minister of State (I/C)
Angul	59	Pallahara	Mahesh Sahoo	Biju Janata Dal	
Angul	60	Talcher	Brajakishore Pradhan	Biju Janata Dal	
Angul	61	Angul	Rajanikant Singh	Biju Janata Dal	
Angul	62	Chhendipada (SC)	Susanta Behera	Biju Janata Dal	
Angul	63	Athamallik	Sanjib Sahoo	Biju Janata Dal	
Subarnapur	64	Birmaharajpur (SC)	Padmanabha Behera	Biju Janata Dal	
Subarnapur	65	Sonepur	Niranjan Pujari	Biju Janata Dal	Speaker
Balangir	66	Loisinga (SC)	Jogendra Behera	Biju Janata Dal	Cabinet Minister
Balangir	67	Patanagarh	Kanak Vardhan Singh Deo	Bharatiya Janata Party	
Balangir	68	Bolangir	Narasingha Mishra	Indian National Congress	Leader of Opposition
Balangir	69	Titilagarh	Tukuni Sahu	Biju Janata Dal	
Balangir	70	Kantabanji	Ayyub Khan	Biju Janata Dal	
Nuapada	71	Nuapada	Basanta Kumar Panda	Bharatiya Janata Party	
Nuapada	72	Khariar	Duryodhan Majhi	Bharatiya Janata Party	Resigned on 22 March 2019
Nuapada	72	Khariar	Vacant (since 22 March 2019)		
Nabarangpur	73	Umerkote (ST)	Subhash Gond	Biju Janata Dal	
Nabarangpur	74	Jharigam (ST)	Ramesh Chandra Majhi	Biju Janata Dal	Cabinet Minister
Nabarangpur	75	Nabarangpur (ST)	Manohar Randhari	Biju Janata Dal	
Nabarangpur	76	Dabugam (ST)	Bhujabal Majhi	Biju Janata Dal	
Kalahandi	77	Lanjigarh (ST)	Balabhadra Majhi	Biju Janata Dal	
Kalahandi	78	Junagarh	Dibya Shankar Mishra	Biju Janata Dal	
Kalahandi	79	Dharmagarh	Puspendra Singh Deo	Biju Janata Dal	Cabinet Minister
Kalahandi	80	Bhabanipatana (SC)	Anam Naik	Biju Janata Dal	
Kalahandi	81	Narla	Dhaneswar Majhi	Biju Janata Dal	
Kandhamal	82	Baliguda	Rajib Patra	Biju Janata Dal	
Kandhamal	83	G. Udayagiri (ST)	Jacob Pradhan	Indian National Congress	Resigned on 28 March 2019
Kandhamal	83	G. Udayagiri (ST)	Vacant (since 28 March 2019)		
Kandhamal	84	Phulbani (ST)	Duguni Kanhar	Biju Janata Dal	
Boudh	85	Kantamal	Mahidhar Rana	Biju Janata Dal	
Boudh	86	Boudh	Pradip Kumar Amat	Biju Janata Dal	Speaker
Cuttack	87	Baramba	Debiprasad Mishra	Biju Janata Dal	Cabinet Minister
Cuttack	88	Banki	Pravat Kumar Tripathy	Biju Janata Dal	
Cuttack	89	Athagarh	Ranendra Pratap Swain	Biju Janata Dal	
Cuttack	90	Barabati-Cuttack	Debashish Samantaray	Biju Janata Dal	
Cuttack	91	Choudwar-Cuttack	Pravat Ranjan Biswal	Biju Janata Dal	
Cuttack	92	Niali (SC)	Pramod Kumar Mallick	Biju Janata Dal	
Cuttack	93	Cuttack Sadar (SC)	Chandra Sarathi Behera	Biju Janata Dal	Minister of State (I/C)
Cuttack	94	Salipur	Prakash Chandra Behera	Indian National Congress	Resigned on 16 March 2019
Cuttack	94	Salipur	Vacant (since 16 March 2019)		
Cuttack	95	Mahanga	Pratap Jena	Biju Janata Dal	Cabinet Minister
Kendrapara	96	Patkura	Bed Prakash Agarwalla	Biju Janata Dal	
Kendrapara	97	Kendrapara (SC)	Kishore Chandra Tarai	Biju Janata Dal	
Kendrapara	98	Aul	Devendra Sharma	Indian National Congress	
Kendrapara	99	Rajanagar	Anshuman Mohanty	Indian National Congress	
Kendrapara	100	Mahakalapada	Atanu Sabyasachi Nayak	Biju Janata Dal	Minister of State (I/C)
Jagatsinghpur	101	Paradeep	Damodar Rout	Biju Janata Dal	Cabinet Minister
Jagatsinghpur	102	Tirtol (SC)	Rajashree Mallick	Biju Janata Dal	
Jagatsinghpur	103	Balikuda-Erasama	Prasanta Kumar Muduli	Biju Janata Dal	
Jagatsinghpur	104	Jagatsingpur	Chiranjib Biswal	Indian National Congress	
Puri	105	Kakatpur (SC)	Surendra Sethy	Biju Janata Dal	
Puri	106	Nimapara	Samir Ranjan Dash	Biju Janata Dal	
Puri	107	Puri	Maheswar Mohanty	Biju Janata Dal	Cabinet Minister
Puri	108	Bramhagiri	Sanjay Kumar Das Burma	Biju Janata Dal	Minister of State (I/C)
Puri	109	Satyabadi	Umakanta Samantaray	Independent	
Puri	110	Pipili	Pradeep Maharathy	Biju Janata Dal	Cabinet Minister
Khordha	111	Jayadev (SC)	Shashi Bhusan Behera	Biju Janata Dal	Cabinet Minister
Khordha	112	Bhubaneswar Central	Bijay Kumar Mohanty	Biju Janata Dal	
Khordha	113	Bhubaneswar North	Priyadarsi Mishra	Biju Janata Dal	
Khordha	114	Ekamra-Bhubaneswar	Ashok Chandra Panda	Biju Janata Dal	Minister of State (I/C)
Khordha	115	Jatani	Bhagirathi Badajena	Biju Janata Dal	
Khordha	116	Begunia	Prasanta Kumar Jagadev	Biju Janata Dal	
Khordha	117	Khurda	Rajendra Kumar Sahoo	Biju Janata Dal	
Khordha	118	Chilika	Bibhutibhusan Harichandran	Bharatiya Janata Party	
Nayagarh	119	Ranpur	Rabinarayan Mohapatra	Biju Janata Dal	
Nayagarh	120	Khandapada	Anubhav Patnaik	Biju Janata Dal	
Nayagarh	121	Daspalla (SC)	Purna Chandra Nayak	Biju Janata Dal	Disqualified on 6 April 2019
Nayagarh	121	Daspalla (SC)	Vacant (since 6 April 2019)		
Nayagarh	122	Nayagarh	Arun Kumar Sahoo	Biju Janata Dal	Minister of State (I/C)
Ganjam	123	Bhanjanagar	Bikram Keshari Arukha	Biju Janata Dal	Cabinet Minister
Ganjam	124	Polasara	Srikanta Sahu	Biju Janata Dal	
Ganjam	125	Kabisuryanagar	V. Sugnana Kumari Deo	Biju Janata Dal	
Ganjam	126	Khalikote (SC)	Purna Chandra Sethy	Biju Janata Dal	
Ganjam	127	Chhatrapur (SC)	Priyansu Pradhan	Biju Janata Dal	
Ganjam	128	Aska	Debaraj Mohanty	Biju Janata Dal	Disqualified on 6 April 2019
Ganjam	128	Aska	Vacant (since 6 April 2019)		
Ganjam	129	Surada	Purna Chandra Swain	Biju Janata Dal	
Ganjam	130	Sanakhemundi	Nandini Debi	Biju Janata Dal	
Ganjam	131	Hinjili	Naveen Patnaik	Biju Janata Dal	Chief Minister
Ganjam	132	Gopalpur	Pradeep Kumar Panigrahy	Biju Janata Dal	Minister of State (I/C)
Ganjam	133	Berhampur	Ramesh Chandra Chyau Patnaik	Biju Janata Dal	
Ganjam	134	Digapahandi	Surjya Narayan Patro	Biju Janata Dal	Cabinet Minister
Ganjam	135	Chikiti	Usha Devi	Biju Janata Dal	Cabinet Minister
Gajapati	136	Mohana (ST)	Basanti Mallick	Biju Janata Dal	Disqualified on 6 April 2019
Gajapati	136	Mohana (ST)	Vacant (since 6 April 2019)		
Gajapati	137	Paralakhemundi	K. Surya Rao	Indian National Congress	
Rayagada	138	Gunupur (ST)	Trinatha Gomango	Biju Janata Dal	Disqualified on 6 April 2019
Rayagada	138	Gunupur (ST)	Vacant (since 6 April 2019)		
Rayagada	139	Bissam Cuttack (ST)	Jagannath Saraka	Biju Janata Dal	
Rayagada	140	Rayagada (ST)	Lal Bihari Himirika	Biju Janata Dal	Cabinet Minister
Koraput	141	Lakhmipur (ST)	Kailasa Chandra Kulesika	Indian National Congress	
Koraput	142	Kotpad (ST)	Chandra Sekhar Majhi	Indian National Congress	
Koraput	143	Jeypore	Tara Prasad Bahinipati	Indian National Congress	
Koraput	144	Koraput (SC)	Krushna Chandra Sagaria	Indian National Congress	Resigned on 6 November 2018
Koraput	144	Koraput (SC)	Vacant (since 6 November 2018)		
Koraput	145	Pottangi (ST)	Prafulla Pangi	Biju Janata Dal	
Malkangiri	146	Malkangiri (ST)	Manasa Madkami	Biju Janata Dal	
Malkangiri	147	Chitrakonda (ST)	Dambaru Sisa	Biju Janata Dal	

== By-polls ==
Source
Year	Constituency	Reason for by-poll	Winning candidate	Party
February 2018	Bijepur	Death of Subal Sahu	Rita Sahu	Biju Janata Dal
