= Third Naveen Patnaik ministry =

Government of Odisha (2009 – 2014)

- 27th Ministry of Odisha
- 2009 – 2014
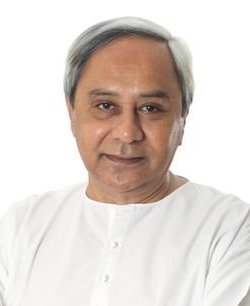
- Naveen Patnaik; Hon'ble Chief Minister of Odisha
- Date formed: 21 May 2009
- Date dissolved: 20 May 2014

People and organisations
- Governor: Murlidhar Chandrakant Bhandare; S.C. Jamir
- Chief Minister: Naveen Patnaik
- No. of ministers: 21
- Member parties: Biju Janata Dal
- Status in legislature: Majority
- Opposition party: Indian National Congress
- Opposition leader: Bhupinder Singh

History
- Incoming formation: 14th Orissa Legislative Assembly
- Outgoing formation: 13th Orissa Legislative Assembly
- Election: 2009 Assembly election
- Legislature terms: 4 years, 364 days
- Predecessor: Second Naveen Patnaik ministry
- Successor: Fourth Naveen Patnaik ministry

Naveen Patnaik was elected as chief minister of Odisha for the third time in 2009 after securing a landslide victory in 2009 Odisha Legislative Assembly election. The elections were held in the state in two phases coinciding with 2009 Indian general election. The results were declared on 16 May 2009. Biju Janata Dal secured 103 seats out of 147 in the fourteenth Odisha Legislative Assembly, becoming the first ever regional party to come to power on its own in the state. The ministry was informally known as Naveen 3.0.

== Brief history ==
After breaking 11 year old alliance with BJP, BJD decided to fight upcoming election independently with limited seat-sharing agreement with NCP, CPM & CPI and won the 2009 Orissa Assembly election with a landslide.

Chief Minister Naveen Patnaik along with 11 Cabinet Ministers and 9 Minister of State with Independent Charges were administered the oath of office and secrecy by Governor Murlidhar Chandrakant Bhandare at the Raj Bhavan, Bhubaneswar on 21 May 2009.

First Cabinet reshuffle took place on 10 May 2011.

Second Cabinet reshuffle took place on 2 August 2012 on the backdrop of May 29 2012 political coup against Chief Minister by now expelled senior party leader & Rajya Sabha member Pyarimohan Mohapatra.

Despite Modi Wave, BJD had a landslide victory in 2014 Odisha Assembly election. Subsequently, Mr. Patnaik gave his resignation to Governor on 20 May 2014.

== Council of Ministers ==
Source
Portfolio	Portrait	Name Constituency	Tenure		Party
Chief Minister; Home; General Administration; Water Resources; Works; Other departments not allocated to any Minister.		Naveen Patnaik; MLA from Hinjili	21 May 2009	20 May 2014	BJD
Forest & Environment		Naveen Patnaik; MLA from Hinjili	21 May 2009	10 May 2011	BJD
Agriculture		Naveen Patnaik; MLA from Hinjili	19 January 2012	2 August 2012	BJD
Women & Child Development; Commerce and Transport		Naveen Patnaik; MLA from Hinjili	1 June 2012	2 August 2012	BJD
Housing & Urban Development		Naveen Patnaik; MLA from Hinjili	4 June 2012	2 August 2012	BJD
Cabinet Minister
Revenue & Disaster Management		Surjya Narayan Patro; MLA from Digapahandi	21 May 2009	20 May 2014	BJD
Finance		Prafulla Chandra Ghadei; MLA from Sukinda	21 May 2009	2 August 2012	BJD
Finance		Prasanna Acharya; MLA from Rairakhol	2 August 2012	20 May 2014	BJD
Excise		Prafulla Chandra Ghadei; MLA from Sukinda	21 May 2009	10 May 2011	BJD
Excise		Ananga Udaya Singh Deo; MLA from Bolangir	10 May 2011	10 February 2012	BJD
Excise		Prafulla Chandra Ghadei; MLA from Sukinda	4 June 2012	2 August 2012	BJD
Excise		Niranjan Pujari; MLA from Sonepur	2 August 2012	20 May 2014	BJD
Public Enterprises		Ananga Udaya Singh Deo; MLA from Bolangir	21 May 2009	10 May 2011	BJD
Public Enterprises		Prafulla Chandra Ghadei; MLA from Sukinda	10 May 2011	2 August 2012	BJD
Public Enterprises		Prasanna Acharya; MLA from Rairakhol	2 August 2012	20 May 2014	BJD
Public Grievances & Pension Administration		Prasanna Acharya; MLA from Rairakhol	21 May 2009	2 August 2012	BJD
Planning & Coordination		Ananga Udaya Singh Deo; MLA from Bolangir	21 May 2009	10 February 2012	BJD
Planning & Coordination		Usha Devi; MLA from Chikiti	10 February 2012	2 August 2012	BJD
Planning & Coordination		Maheswar Mohanty; MLA from Puri	2 August 2012	20 May 2014	BJD
Agriculture		Damodar Rout; MLA from Paradeep	21 May 2009	10 May 2011	BJD
Agriculture		Pradeep Maharathy; MLA from Pipili	10 May 2011	19 January 2012	BJD
Agriculture		Debiprasad Mishra; MLA from Baramba	2 August 2012	20 May 2014	BJD
Fisheries & Animal Resources Development		Damodar Rout; MLA from Paradeep	21 May 2009	10 May 2011	BJD
Fisheries & Animal Resources Development		Debiprasad Mishra; MLA from Baramba	2 August 2012	20 May 2014	BJD
Co-operation		Damodar Rout; MLA from Paradeep	21 May 2009	10 May 2011	BJD
Co-operation		Prafulla Samal; MLA from Bhandaripokhari	10 May 2011	2 August 2012	BJD
Co-operation		Bikram Keshari Arukha; MLA from Bhanjanagar	2 August 2012	20 May 2014	BJD
Industries		Raghunath Mohanty; MLA from Basta	21 May 2009	2 August 2012	BJD
Industries		Niranjan Pujari; MLA from Sonepur	2 August 2012	20 May 2014	BJD
Steel & Mines		Raghunath Mohanty; MLA from Basta	21 May 2009	2 August 2012	BJD
Housing & Urban Development		Raghunath Mohanty; MLA from Basta	2 August 2012	15 March 2013	BJD
Housing & Urban Development		Debiprasad Mishra; MLA from Baramba	15 March 2013	20 May 2014	BJD
Information Technology		Raghunath Mohanty; MLA from Basta	2 August 2012	15 March 2013	BJD
Parliamentary Affairs		Raghunath Mohanty; MLA from Basta	21 May 2009	2 August 2012	BJD
Parliamentary Affairs		Kalpataru Das; MLA from Dharmasala	2 August 2012	20 May 2014	BJD
Women & Child Development		Pramila Mallik; MLA from Binjharpur	21 May 2009	7 February 2011	BJD
Women & Child Development		Prafulla Samal; MLA from Bhandaripokhari	7 February 2011	10 May 2011	BJD
Women & Child Development		Anjali Behera; MLA from Hindol	10 May 2011	1 June 2012	BJD
Women & Child Development		Usha Devi; MLA from Chikiti	2 August 2012	20 May 2014	BJD
Forest & Environment		Debiprasad Mishra; MLA from Baramba	10 May 2011	2 August 2012	BJD
Forest & Environment		Bijayshree Routray; MLA from Basudevpur	2 August 2012	20 May 2014	BJD
Labour & Employment & State Insurance Portfolios		Bijayshree Routray; MLA from Basudevpur	2 August 2012	20 May 2014	BJD
Higher Education		Debiprasad Mishra; MLA from Baramba	21 May 2009	10 May 2011	BJD
Culture; Tourism		Debiprasad Mishra; MLA from Baramba	21 May 2009	10 May 2011	BJD
Culture; Tourism		Prafulla Samal; MLA from Bhandaripokhari	10 May 2011	2 August 2012	BJD
Culture; Tourism		Maheswar Mohanty; MLA from Puri	2 August 2012	20 May 2014	BJD
Health & Family Welfare		Prasanna Acharya; MLA from Rairakhol	21 May 2009	2 August 2012	BJD
Health & Family Welfare		Damodar Rout; MLA from Paradeep	2 August 2012	20 May 2014	BJD
Micro, Small & Medium Enterprises		Damodar Rout; MLA from Paradeep	2 August 2012	20 May 2014	BJD
Panchayati Raj		Prafulla Samal; MLA from Bhandaripokhari	21 May 2009	10 May 2011	BJD
Panchayati Raj		Maheswar Mohanty; MLA from Puri	10 May 2011	2 August 2012	BJD
Panchayati Raj		Kalpataru Das; MLA from Dharmasala	2 August 2012	20 May 2014	BJD
Information & Public Relations		Prafulla Samal; MLA from Bhandaripokhari	21 May 2009	10 May 2011	BJD
Information & Public Relations		Surjya Narayan Patro; MLA from Digapahandi	10 May 2011	2 August 2012	BJD
S.T. & S.C. Development, Minorities & Backward Classes Welfare		Bijaya Ranjan Singh Bariha; MLA from Padampur	21 May 2009	10 May 2011	BJD
S.T. & S.C. Development, Minorities & Backward Classes Welfare		Lal Bihari Himirika; MLA from Rayagada	10 May 2011	20 May 2014	BJD
Rural Development		Bikram Keshari Arukha; MLA from Bhanjanagar	21 May 2009	20 May 2014	BJD
Law		Bikram Keshari Arukha; MLA from Bhanjanagar	21 May 2009	2 August 2012	BJD
Law		Raghunath Mohanty; MLA from Basta	2 August 2012	15 March 2013	BJD
Law		Maheswar Mohanty; MLA from Puri	15 March 2013	20 May 2014	BJD
Textiles & Handlooms		Usha Devi; MLA from Chikiti	10 May 2011	2 August 2012	BJD
Science & Technology		Usha Devi; MLA from Chikiti	10 May 2011	10 February 2012	BJD
Science & Technology		Niranjan Pujari; MLA from Sonepur	10 February 2012	2 August 2012	BJD
Food Supplies & Consumer Welfare		Niranjan Pujari; MLA from Sonepur	10 May 2011	2 August 2012	BJD
Ministers of State with Independent Charges
Commerce and Transport		Sanjeeb Kumar Sahoo; MLA from Athmallik	21 May 2009	1 June 2012	BJD
Commerce and Transport		Subrat Tarai; MLA from Raghunathpali	2 August 2012	20 May 2014	BJD
Labour & Employement		Puspendra Singh Deo; MLA from Dharmagarh	21 May 2009	2 August 2012	BJD
School & Mass Education		Pratap Jena; MLA from Mahanga	21 May 2009	2 August 2012	BJD
School & Mass Education		Rabi Narayan Nanda; MLA from Jeypore	2 August 2012	20 May 2014	BJD
Energy		Atanu Sabyasachi Nayak; MLA from Mahakalapada	21 May 2009	2 August 2012	BJD
Energy		Arun Kumar Sahoo; MLA from Nayagarh	2 August 2012	20 May 2014	BJD
Information & Public Relations		Arun Kumar Sahoo; MLA from Nayagarh	2 August 2012	20 May 2014	BJD
Sports & Youth Services		Praveen Chandra Bhanj Deo; MLA from Morada	21 May 2009	10 May 2011	BJD
Sports & Youth Services		Badri Narayan Patra; MLA from Ghasipura	10 May 2011	2 August 2012	BJD
Sports & Youth Services		Ramesh Chandra Majhi; MLA from Jharigam	2 August 2012	20 May 2014	BJD
Higher Education		Badri Narayan Patra; MLA from Ghasipura	10 May 2011	20 May 2014	BJD
Housing & Urban Development		Badri Narayan Patra; MLA from Ghasipura	21 May 2009	10 May 2011	BJD
Housing & Urban Development		Sarada Prashad Nayak; MLA from Rourkela	10 May 2011	4 June 2012	BJD
Food Supplies & Consumer Welfare		Sarada Prashad Nayak; MLA from Rourkela	21 May 2009	10 May 2011	BJD
Excise		Sarada Prashad Nayak; MLA from Rourkela	10 February 2012	4 June 2012	BJD
Information Technology		Ramesh Chandra Majhi; MLA from Jharigam	21 May 2009	2 August 2012	BJD
Information Technology		Pratap Keshari Deb; MLA from Aul	15 March 2013	20 May 2014	BJD
Food Supplies & Consumer Welfare		Pratap Keshari Deb; MLA from Aul	2 August 2012	20 May 2014	BJD
Employment & Technical Education & Training		Pratap Keshari Deb; MLA from Aul	2 August 2012	20 May 2014	BJD
Science & Technology		Ramesh Chandra Majhi; MLA from Jharigam	21 May 2009	10 May 2011	BJD
Fisheries & Animal Resources Development		Ramesh Chandra Majhi; MLA from Jharigam	10 May 2011	2 August 2012	BJD
Public Grievances & Pension Administration; Science & Technology		Ramesh Chandra Majhi; MLA from Jharigam	2 August 2012	20 May 2014	BJD
Textiles & Handlooms		Anjali Behera; MLA from Hindol	21 May 2009	10 May 2011	BJD
Textiles & Handlooms		Sarojini Hembram; MLA from Bangriposi	2 August 2012	20 May 2014	BJD
Steel & Mines		Rajanikant Singh; MLA from Angul	2 August 2012	20 May 2014	BJD
Ministers of State
Revenue & Disaster Management		Praveen Chandra Bhanj Deo; MLA from Morada	21 May 2009	10 May 2011	BJD
Minor Irrigation		Puspendra Singh Deo; MLA from Dharmagarh	10 May 2011	2 August 2012	BJD
Tribal Welfare		Ramesh Chandra Majhi; MLA from Jharigam	10 May 2011	2 August 2012	BJD

== Demographics ==
Division	District	Ministers	Cabinet Ministers	Ministers of State
Northern	Angul	2	–	Sanjeeb Kumar Sahoo; Rajanikant Singh
Northern	Balangir	1	Ananga Udaya Singh Deo	–
Northern	Bargarh	0	–	–
Northern	Dhenkanal	0	–	–
Northern	Deogarh	0	–	–
Northern	Jharsuguda	0	–	–
Northern	Keonjhar	1	–	Badri Narayan Patra
Northern	Subarnapur	1	Niranjan Pujari	–
Northern	Sambalpur	1	Prasanna Acharya	–
Northern	Sundergarh	2	–	Subrat Tarai; Sarada Prasad Nayak
Central	Balasore	2	Raghunath Mohanty	Ananta Das
Central	Bhadrak	2	Prafulla Samal; Bijayshree Routray	–
Central	Cuttack	2	Debi Prasad Mishra	Pratap Jena
Central	Jagatsinghpur	1	Damodar Rout	–
Central	Jajpur	3	Prafulla Chandra Ghadei; Kalpataru Das; Pramila Mallik	–
Central	Khorda	0	–	–
Central	Kendrapara	3	Anjali Behera	Atanu Sabyasachi Nayak; Pratap Keshari Deb
Central	Mayurbhanj	2	–	Praveen Chandra Bhanj Deo; Sarojini Hembram
Central	Nayagarh	1	–	Arun Kumar Sahoo
Central	Puri	2	Pradeep Maharathy; Maheswar Mohanty	–
Southern	Boudh	0	–	–
Southern	Gajapati	0	–	–
Southern	Ganjam	4	Naveen Patnaik (Chief Minister); Surjya Narayan Patro; Bikram Keshari Arukha; Usha Devi	–
Southern	Kalahandi	1	–	Puspendra Singh Deo
Southern	Kandhamal	0	–	–
Southern	Koraput	0	–	–
Southern	Malkangiri	0	–	–
Southern	Nabarangpur	1	–	Ramesh Chandra Majhi
Southern	Nuapada	0	–	–
Southern	Rayagada	1	–	Rabi Narayan Nanda
