= Naveen Patnaik ministry =

Naveen Patnaik ministry may refer to these cabinets headed by Indian politician Naveen Patnaik as chief minister of Odisha:

- First Naveen Patnaik ministry (2000–2004)
- Second Naveen Patnaik ministry (2004–2009)
- Third Naveen Patnaik ministry (2009–2014)
- Fourth Naveen Patnaik ministry (2014–2019)
- Fifth Naveen Patnaik ministry (2019–2024)
