= Jitu Patnaik =

Indian politician

Jitu Patnaik is a politician from Odisha, India. He represented the Champua (Odisha Vidhan Sabha constituency) between the year 2009 to 2014. In the year 2009 he won the Champua (Odisha Vidhan Sabha constituency) seat from his nearest rival Sanatan Mahakud by a paltry margin of 145 votes, the thinnest in the State.
