= Anjali Behera =

Indian politician

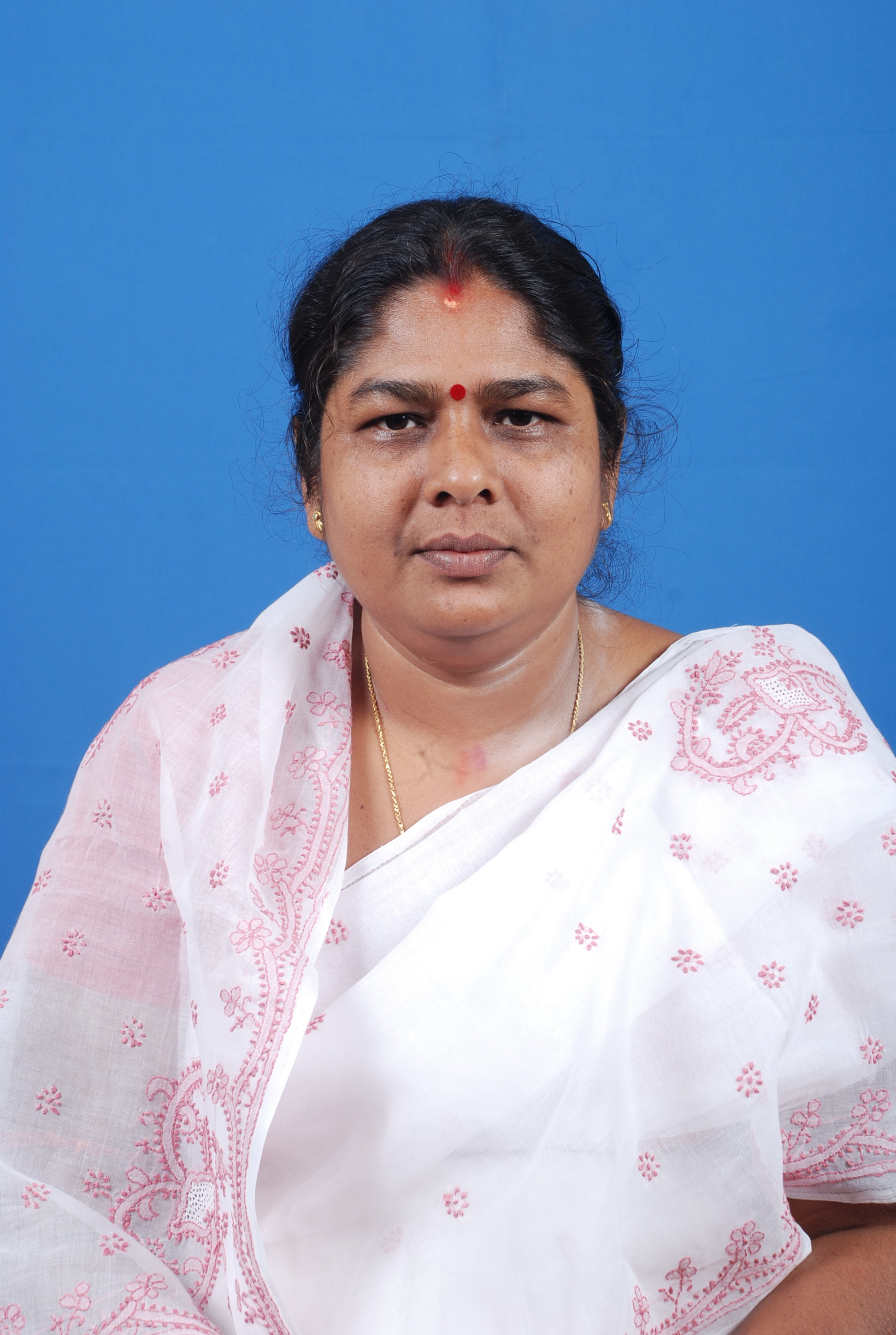

Member of the Odisha Legislative Assembly
- In office 2000-2014
- Preceded by: Maheswara Naik
- Succeeded by: Seemarani Nayak
- Constituency: Hindol

Personal details
- Born: May 4, 1972 (age 53)
- Party: Biju Janata Dal
- Other political affiliations: Janata Dal

Anjali Behera is an Indian politician. She was elected to the Odisha Legislative Assembly as a member of the Biju Janata Dal.
