= Pradeep Kumar Panigrahy =

Member of the Lok Sabha

Member of Parliament, Lok Sabha
- Incumbent
- Assumed office 4 June 2024
- Preceded by: Chandra Sekhar Sahu
- Constituency: Berhampur

Personal details
- Party: Bharatiya Janata Party(2024-Present)
- Other political affiliations: Biju Janata Dal (2009-2023)
- Spouse: Sujata Panigrahy
- Children: 2
- Parent(s): Somnath Panigrahy (father); Sari Panigrahy (mother)
- Education: Master in Law
- Occupation: Advocate

Pradeep Kumar Panigrahy (born 3 April 1963) is an Indian politician from Gopalpur, Odisha. He is as a Member of Parliament from Berhampur Lok Sabha constituency. He belongs to Bharatiya Janata Party.

Pradeep Panigrahi was expelled from BJD for anti-people activities in 2022 and later he joined BJP in the presence of party state president Manmohan Samal in Bhubaneswar on 21 February 2024.
