= Maheswar Mohanty =

Indian politician (1956–2023)

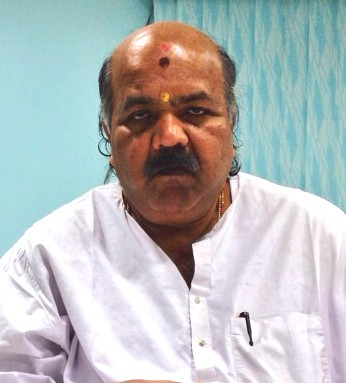
- Mohanty in 2013

Member of the Odisha Legislative Assembly
- In office 1995–2019
- Preceded by: Uma Ballav Rath
- Succeeded by: Jayant Kumar Sarangi
- Constituency: Puri

Personal details
- Born: 26 February 1956 Puri, Odisha, India
- Died: 7 November 2023 (aged 67) Bhubaneswar, Odisha, India
- Citizenship: Indian
- Party: Biju Janata Dal
- Other political affiliations: Janata Dal
- Spouse: Bishnupriya Mohanty
- Children: 2
- Parent: Narayan Mohanty (father)
- Occupation: Lawyer, politician

Maheswar Mohanty (26 February 1956 – 7 November 2023) was an Indian politician from Odisha. He worked as the speaker of Odisha Vidhan Sabha from 2004 to 2008.

== Biography ==
Maheswar Mohanty was born on 26 February 1956 in Puri to Narayan Mohanty. He was married to Bishnupriya Mohanty and the couple had two children. He had completed his LLB from SCS College, Puri (Utkal University) and MA in Political Science from Banaras Hindu University.

Mohanty was elected five times to Odisha Vidhan Sabha from 1995 to 2019. He served as a speaker and held several ministries like Revenue and Disaster Management, Law, Planning and Coordination, Tourism and Culture, Panchayati Raj in the cabinet of Naveen Patnaik.

Mohanty died from a stroke in Bhubaneswar, on 7 November 2023, at the age of 67.

== Political career ==
Tern start	Tertm end	Position	Constituency	Party
1995	2000	Member, 11th Odisha Vidhan Sabha	Puri	Janata Dal
2000	2004	Member, 12th Odisha Vidhan Sabha	Puri	Biju Janata Dal
2004	2009	Member, 13th Odisha Vidhan Sabha	Puri	Biju Janata Dal
2009	2014	Member, 14th Odisha Vidhan Sabha	Puri	Biju Janata Dal
2014	2019	Member, 15th Odisha Vidhan Sabha	Puri	Biju Janata Dal
