= Paradeep Assembly constituency =

Constituency of the Odisha legislative assembly in India

Coordinates: 20.29°N 86.65°E

Paradeep
- Constituency No. 101 for the Odisha Legislative Assembly
- Paradeep Assembly constituency in Jagatsinghpur district

Constituency details
- Country: India
- Region: East India
- State: Odisha
- Division: Central Division
- District: Jagatsinghpur
- Lok Sabha constituency: Jagatsinghpur
- Established: 2009
- Total electors: 2,20,649 (Note: as on 2024) (Note: as data published by election commission)
- Reservation: None

Member of Legislative Assembly
- 17th Odisha Legislative Assembly
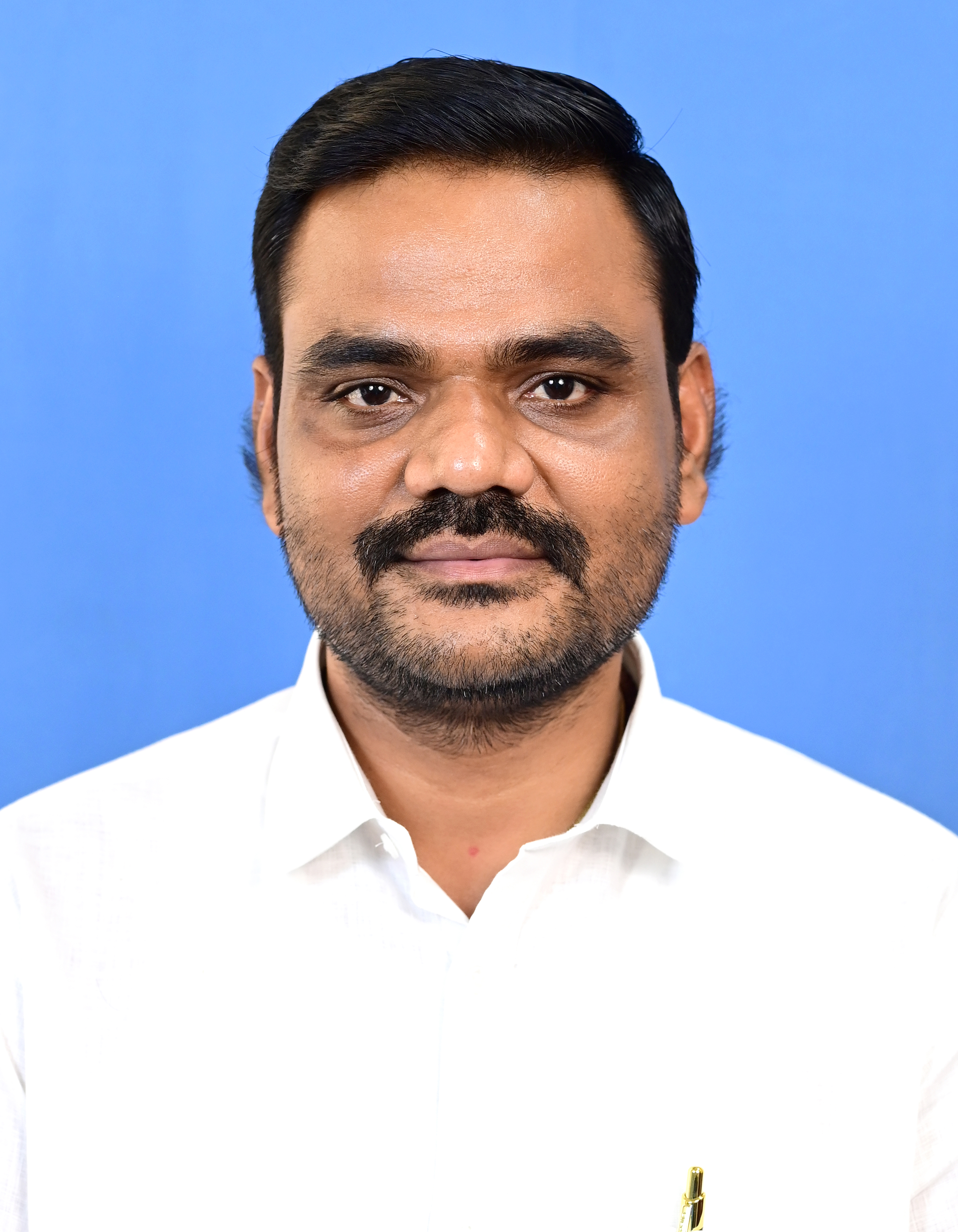
- Incumbent Sampad Chandra Swain
- Party: Bharatiya Janata Party
- Elected year: 2024

Paradeep is a Vidhan Sabha constituency of Jagatsinghpur district, Odisha.

This constituency includes Paradeep, Kujang block and 7 Gram panchayats (Amberi, Kolar, Samantarapur, Poragadei, Manijanga, Bodhei and Jadatira) of Tirtol block.

The constituency was formed in 2008 Delimitation and went for polls in 2009 election.

== Elected members ==
Vote share of winning candidates
2024	51.55%
2019	44.73%
2014	59.15%
2009	53.21%

Since its formation in 2009, 4 elections have been held till date.

List of members elected Paradeep constituency are:

Year	Member	Party
2024	Sampad Chandra Swain	Bharatiya Janata Party
2019	Sambit Routray	Biju Janata Dal
2014	Damodar Rout	Biju Janata Dal
2009	Damodar Rout	Biju Janata Dal

== Election results ==
=== 2024 ===
Voting was held on 1 June 2024 in the 4th phase of the Odisha Assembly Election & 7th phase of the Indian General Election. The counting of votes was on 4 June 2024. In 2024 election, Bharatiya Janata Party candidate Sampad Chandra Swain defeated Biju Janata Dal candidate Geetanjali Routray by a margin of 15,787 votes.

2024 Odisha Vidhan Sabha Election, Paradeep
Party	Candidate	Votes	%	±%
BJP	Sampad Chandra Swain	84,518	51.55	
BJD	Gitanjali Routray	68,731	41.92	
INC	Niranjan Nayak	7,610	4.64	
NOTA	None of the above	491	0.3	
Majority		15,787	9.63	
Turnout		1,63,951	74.3	
BJP gain from BJD				

=== 2019 ===
In 2019 election, Biju Janata Dal candidate Sambit Routray defeated Indian National Congress candidate Arindam Sarkhel by a margin of 20,992 votes.

2019 Odisha Vidhan Sabha Election, Paradeep
Party	Candidate	Votes	%	±%
BJD	Sambit Routray	69,871	44.73	
INC	Arindam Sarkhel	48,879	31.29	
BJP	Sampad Chandra Swain	35,037	22.43	
NOTA	None of the above	495	0.32	
Majority		20,992	13.44	
Turnout		1,56,208	73.73	
BJD hold				

=== 2014 ===
In the 2014 election, Biju Janata Dal candidate Damodar Rout defeated Indian National Congress candidate Arindam Sarkhel by a margin of 38,600 votes.

2014 Odisha Vidhan Sabha Election, Paradeep
Party	Candidate	Votes	%	±%
BJD	Damodar Rout	85,206	59.15	▲5.94
INC	Arindam Sarkhel	46,606	32.35	▲21.43
BJP	Diptirekha Nayak	5,832	4.05	▲1.14
NOTA	None of the above	926	0.64	−
Majority		38,600	26.79	▲2.64
Turnout		144055	76.63	▲9.01
Registered electors		1,87,991		
BJD hold				

=== 2009 ===
In 2009 election, Biju Janata Dal candidate Damodar Rout defeated Independent candidate Ramesh Samantaray by a margin of 30,351 votes.

2009 Vidhan Sabha Election, Paradeep
Party	Candidate	Votes	%	±%
BJD	Damodar Rout	66,863	53.21	−
Independent	Ramesh Samantaray	36,512	29.05	−
INC	Pramod Kishore Jena	13,718	10.92	−
BJP	Sankhanada Behera	3,652	2.91	−
Majority		30,351	24.15 (Note: % of total valid votes)	−
Turnout		1,25,681	67.62	−
Registered electors		1,85,874		
BJD win (new seat)				
