= Bijayshree Routray =

Indian politician (1953–2021)

Bijayshree Routray (28 July 1953 – 2 June 2021) was a politician from Odisha, India.

== Biography ==
He was a member of the Odisha Legislative Assembly representing Basudevpur from 1990 until 2019.

Routray died from COVID-19 at age 67 in Bhubaneswar during the COVID-19 pandemic in Odisha.
