= Naveen Patnaik =

Indian politician and former Chief Minister of Odisha (born 1946)

- ନବୀନ ପଟ୍ଟନାୟକ
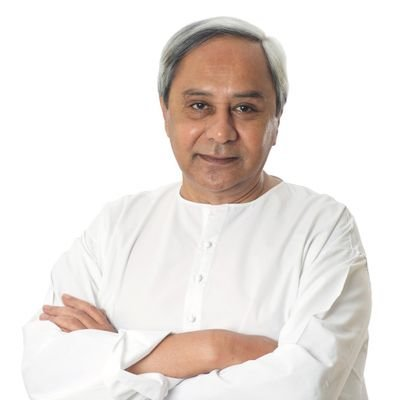
- Patnaik in 2019

Leader of the Opposition, Odisha Legislative Assembly
- Incumbent
- Assumed office 20 June 2024
- Governor: Raghubar Das; Kambhampati Hari Babu; Braj Mohan Ram
- Chief Minister: Mohan Charan Majhi
- Preceded by: Jayanarayan Mishra

14th Chief Minister of Odisha
- In office 5 March 2000 – 12 June 2024
- Governor: M. M. Rajendran; Rameshwar Thakur; Murlidhar Chandrakant Bhandare; S. C. Jamir; Satya Pal Malik; Ganeshi Lal; Raghubar Das
- Cabinets: Patnaik I; Patnaik II; Patnaik III; Patnaik IV; Patnaik V
- Preceded by: Hemananda Biswal
- Succeeded by: Mohan Charan Majhi

Member of the Odisha Legislative Assembly
- Incumbent
- Assumed office 5 March 2000
- Prime Minister: Atal Bihari Vajpayee
- Preceded by: Udayanath Nayak
- Constituency: Hinjili (also Bijepur, May–June 2019)

Union Minister of Mines and Minerals
- In office 13 October 1999 – 4 March 2000
- Other parties: Janata Dal (1997)
- Preceded by: Ministry reorganised
- Succeeded by: Atal Bihari Vajpayee

Union Minister of Steel and Mines
- In office 19 March 1998 – 13 October 1999
- Preceded by: Birendra Prasad Baishya
- Succeeded by: Dilip Ray (Steel)

President of the Biju Janata Dal
- Incumbent
- Assumed office 26 December 1997
- Preceded by: Position established

Member of Parliament, Lok Sabha
- In office June 1997 – 4 March 2000
- Preceded by: Biju Patnaik
- Succeeded by: Kumudini Patnaik
- Constituency: Aska

Personal details
- Born: 16 October 1946 (age 80) Cuttack, Orissa Province, British India (now Odisha, India)
- Party: Biju Janata Dal (1997–present)
- Parents: Biju Patnaik (father); Gyan Patnaik (mother)
- Relatives: Prem Patnaik (brother); Gita Mehta (sister); Sonny Mehta (brother-in-law)
- Education: The Lawrence School, Sanawar; The Doon School; Kirori Mal College, University of Delhi (BA)
- Profession: Politician; writer
- Website: naveenpatnaik.in

Naveen Patnaik (Odia: ନବୀନ ପଟ୍ଟନାୟକ, pronounced [n̪ɔbin̪ pɔʈn̪ajk]; born 16 October 1946) is an Indian politician and author who has served as the Leader of the Opposition in the Odisha Legislative Assembly since 20 June 2024. He previously served five consecutive terms as the 14th Chief Minister of Odisha from 5 March 2000 to 12 June 2024. With a continuous tenure of 24 years and 99 days, he is the longest-serving Chief Minister in Odisha's history and the second-longest-serving Chief Minister of any Indian state, after Pawan Kumar Chamling of Sikkim. He is also the founder and national president of the Biju Janata Dal (BJD), a post he has held continuously since December 1997.

Born in Cuttack to former Odisha Chief Minister Biju Patnaik, Patnaik spent much of his early career as a writer before entering politics following his father's death in April 1997. He was first elected to the 11th Lok Sabha in a June 1997 by-election from the Aska Lok Sabha constituency on a Janata Dal ticket. In December 1997, he split from the Janata Dal to establish the Biju Janata Dal, subsequently retaining the Aska parliamentary seat in the 1998 and 1999 general elections. He served in the Union Cabinet under Prime Minister Atal Bihari Vajpayee as Union Minister of Steel and Mines in the Second Vajpayee ministry (1998–1999) and as Union Minister of Mines and Minerals in the Third Vajpayee ministry (1999–2000).

Following the BJD–Bharatiya Janata Party (BJP) alliance victory in the 2000 Odisha Legislative Assembly election, Patnaik resigned from the Union Cabinet to become Chief Minister of Odisha and has represented the Hinjili Assembly constituency for six consecutive terms. After governing in coalition with the BJP for two terms (2000–2009), he severed ties with the BJP ahead of the 2009 elections and led the BJD to three consecutive independent majorities in 2009, 2014, and 2019. Following the BJD's defeat by the BJP in the 2024 Odisha Legislative Assembly election, Patnaik demitted office as Chief Minister in June 2024 and assumed the role of Leader of the Opposition in the 17th Odisha Legislative Assembly.

== Early life ==
Patnaik was born on 16 October 1946 in an aristocratic Karan family to Biju Patnaik, former Chief Minister of Odisha, and his wife, Gyan Devi (1919-2009).

He was educated at the Welham Boys' School in Dehradun, The Lawrence School, Sanawar and later The Doon School. At Doon, he was a classmate of Sanjay Gandhi and three years junior to Rajiv Gandhi, who later became prime minister of India.

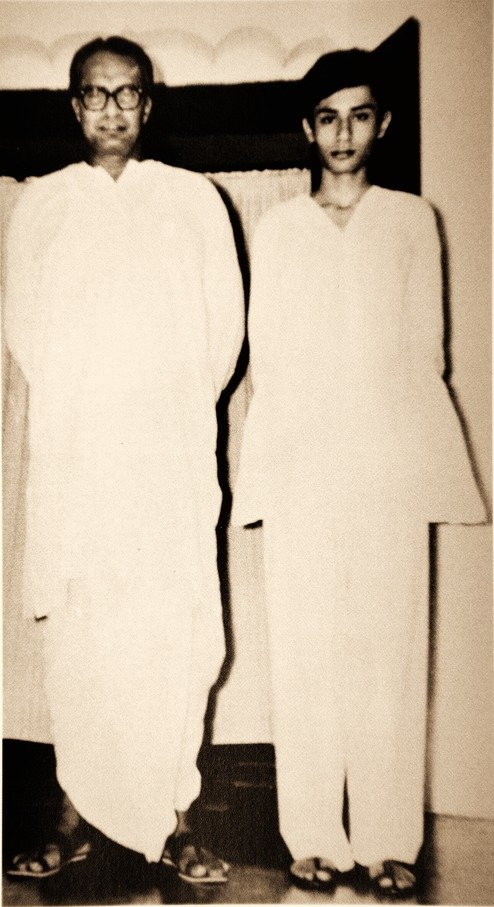
Naveen Patnaik with his father Biju Patnaik in 1950s

After school, he went to the Kirori Mal College of Delhi University, and obtained a Bachelor of Arts degree.

== Political career ==
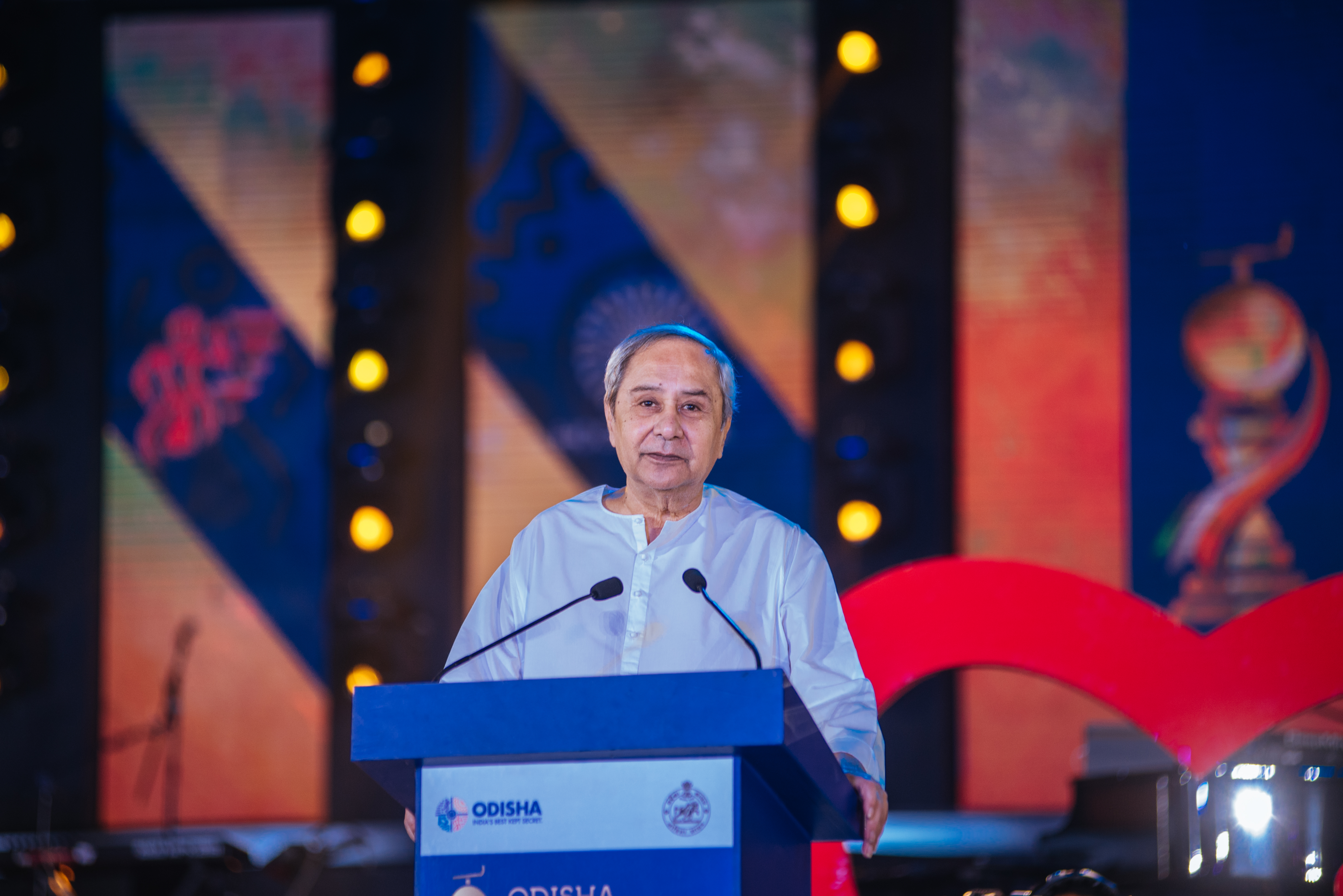
Naveen Patnaik at the Opening Ceremony Hockey World Cup 2018

After the death of his father Biju Patnaik, leader of the Janata Dal, he was elected as a member to the 11th Lok Sabha in the by-election from Aska Parliamentary Constituency in Odisha, India. He was a member of the Consultative Committee of Ministry of Steel & Mines, Member of Standing Committee on Commerce, and Member Library Committee of Parliament.

In December 1997, Naveen split from the Janata Dal and founded the Biju Janata Dal, named after Biju Patnaik. The new party went into alliance with the BJP-led National Democratic Alliance for 1998 election. The alliance performed well winning 16 out of 21 seats and Naveen Patnaik was selected as the Union Minister for Mines in the cabinet of Atal Bihari Vajpayee.

=== Chief Minister of Odisha ===
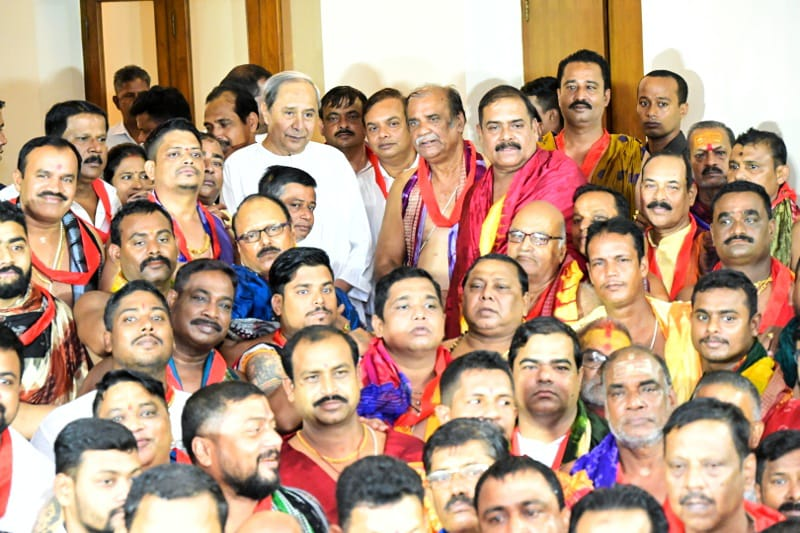
Sevayats of Lingaraj Temple inviting Naveen Patnaik for the Bhumipujan of Ekamra Prakalpa.

In the 2000 Assembly election, BJD won the majority of seats in alliance with the BJP in the Odisha Assembly elections, Patnaik resigned from the Union cabinet and was sworn in as the Chief Minister of Odisha. He took office on the 84th birth anniversary of his father.

BJP led NDA lost the general elections in 2004, however, the coalition led by Naveen Patnaik emerged victorious in the state legislative elections and he continued as the Chief Minister. During this tenure, the friction between the ruling partners was getting more and more apparent, especially after the killing of Swami Laxmanananda Saraswati in the Kandhamal district of Odisha in 2007–2008 and also the active participation of Bajrang Dal in the riots that hit Kandhamal region.

In the run-up to the polls for the Lok Sabha and Legislative Assembly of Odisha elections in 2009, BJD walked out of the NDA after severing ties with the BJP and joined the nascent Third Front constituted mainly by the Left Front and few regional parties. He did it after severely criticizing BJP's involvement in Kandhamal anti-Christian riots during 2008. The BJD won a resounding victory in both the Vidhan Sabha (State Assembly) as well as the Lok Sabha elections in 2009, winning 14 out of 21 Lok Sabha seats and 103 of the 147 assembly seats and was sworn in as the Chief Minister of Odisha on 21 May 2009 for the third consecutive term.

Patnaik won a huge victory in both the 2014 Indian general elections and the Legislative Assembly of Odisha elections in 2014. Patnaik's Biju Janata Dal secured 20 out of the 21 Lok Sabha seats of Odisha and 117 of the 147 Odisha Vidhan Sabha seats.

In spite of a strong BJP wave across the country, the Biju Janata Dal, under the leadership of Naveen Patnaik won as many as 112 seats out of 146 (polls for 1 was deferred) in the Legislative Assembly of Odisha and 12 out of 21 Lok Sabha seats in 2019 Indian general elections.

His 24-year tenure is the second longest for a chief minister of any Indian state, after Pawan Kumar Chamling of Sikkim.

=== Odisha Leader of Opposition ===
The Biju Janata Dal was voted out of power in the 2024 Odisha Legislative Assembly election as the party managed to win 51 seats in Legislative Assembly of Odisha, thus ending Patnaik's 24-year rule in Odisha. Patnaik was himself defeated in Kantabanji constituency by 16,344 votes, marking his first electoral defeat. However, he did win the Hinjili seat with a margin of below 5000. In Lok Sabha elections, the BJD, for the first time, failed to win any of the seats it contested.

== Ministerial Positions ==
| # | Government | Designation | Portfolio | Tenure | | Constituency | Party |
Government of India
| 1 | Vajpayee II | Cabinet Minister | Ministry of Steel & Ministry of Mines & Minerals | 19 March 1998 | 13 October 1999 | Aska | BJD |
| 2 | Vajpayee III | Cabinet Minister | Ministry of Mines & Minerals | 13 October 1999 | 4 March 2000 | Aska | BJD |
Government of Odisha
| 3 | Naveen I | Chief Minister | Chief Minister Office | 5 March 2000 | 15 May 2004 | Hinjili | BJD |
| 4 | Naveen II | Chief Minister | Chief Minister Office | 16 May 2004 | 21 May 2009 | Hinjili | BJD |
| 5 | Naveen III | Chief Minister | Chief Minister Office | 22 May 2009 | 20 May 2014 | Hinjili | BJD |
| 6 | Naveen IV | Chief Minister | Chief Minister Office | 21 May 2014 | 28 May 2019 | Hinjili | BJD |
| 7 | Naveen V | Chief Minister | Chief Minister Office | 29 May 2019 | 11 June 2024 | Hinjili | BJD |
| 8 | Leader of Opposition, Odisha Legislative Assembly | | | 19 June 2024 | Incumbent | Hinjili | BJD |

== Electoral history ==
Patnaik entered electoral politics in May 1997, contesting the Aska parliamentary by-election as a Janata Dal candidate following the death of his father, Biju Patnaik. After founding the Biju Janata Dal (BJD) in December 1997, he retained the Aska Lok Sabha seat in the 1998 and 1999 general elections. Moving to state politics in 2000, he has been elected to the Odisha Legislative Assembly six consecutive times from Hinjili (2000–2024). In 2019, he contested from two constituencies for the first time, winning both Hinjili and Bijepur before vacating the latter. In 2024, he again contested from two seats, retaining Hinjili while losing Kantabanji in his first electoral defeat.

=== Lok Sabha ===
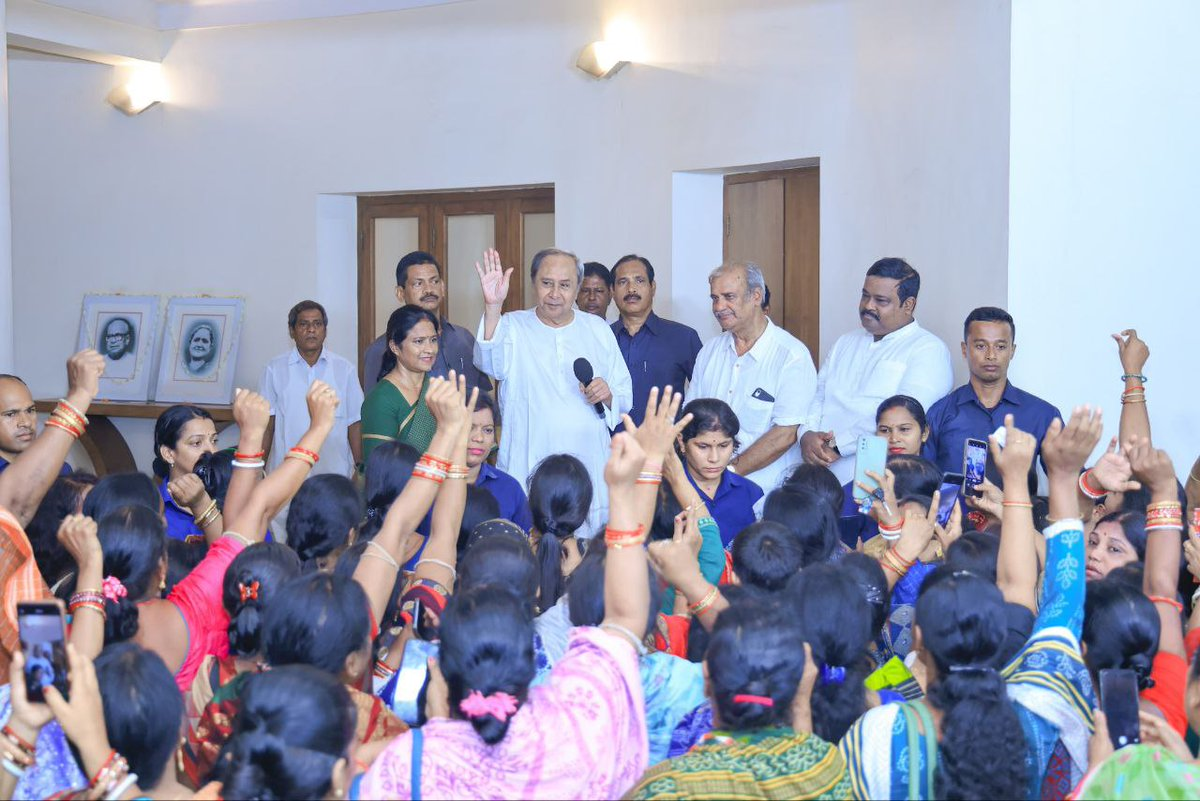
Naveen Patnaik with BJD workers at his residence in 2024

Lok Sabha elections contested by Naveen Patnaik
| Year | Constituency | Party | Votes | % | Opponent | Opponent party | Opponent votes | % | Result | Margin | % |
|---|---|---|---|---|---|---|---|---|---|---|---|
| 1999 | Aska | Biju Janata Dal | 359,178 | 74.90 | Duti Krushna Panda | Communist Party of India | 102,442 | 21.36 | Won | 256,736 | 53.54 |
| 1998 | Aska | Biju Janata Dal | 310,751 | 53.88 | Chandra Sekhar Sahu | Indian National Congress | 224,540 | 38.93 | Won | 86,211 | 14.95 |
| 1997 (bypoll) | Aska | Janata Dal | 263,902 | 56.64 | Rama Chandra Rath | Indian National Congress | 195,732 | 42.01 | Won | 68,170 | 14.63 |

=== Odisha Legislative Assembly ===
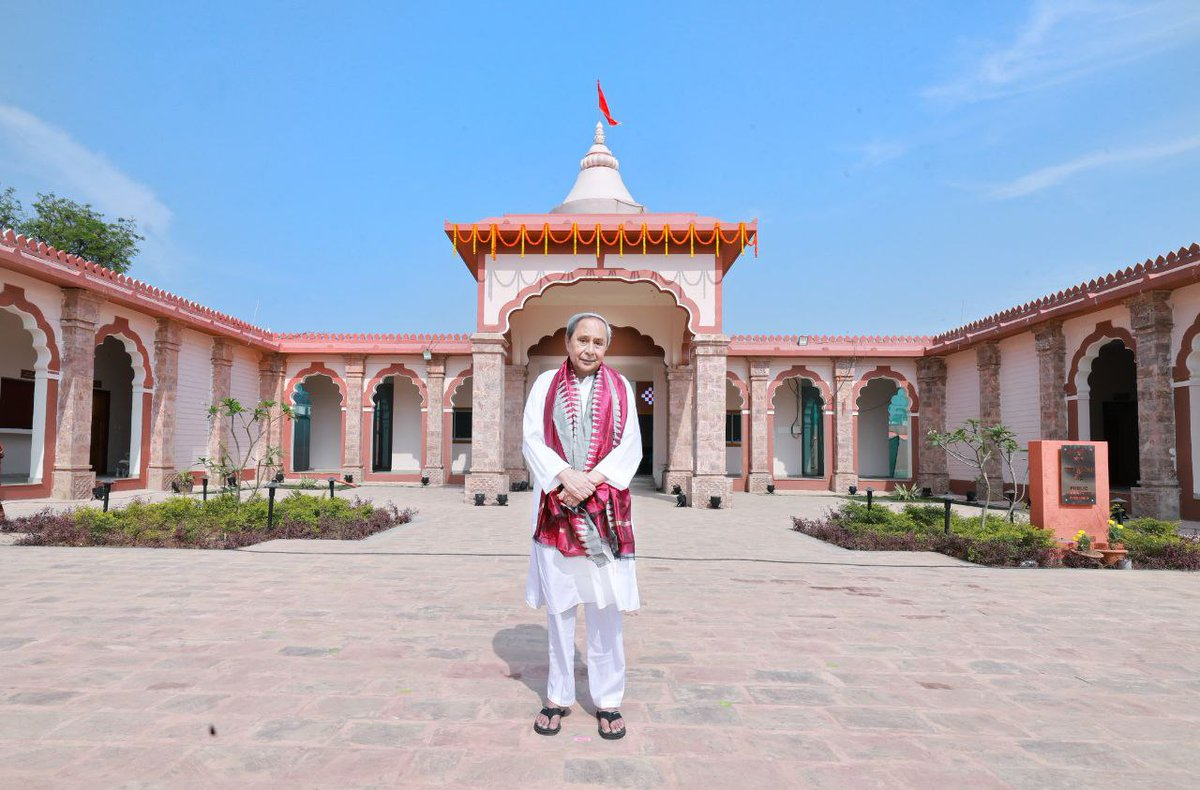
Naveen Patnaik at the Maa Samaleswari Temple after inaugurating the Samaleswari Temple Area Management and Local Economy Initiatives (SAMALEI) project in 2024

Odisha Legislative Assembly elections contested by Naveen Patnaik
| Year | Constituency | Party | Votes | % | Opponent | Opponent party | Opponent votes | % | Result | Margin | % |
|---|---|---|---|---|---|---|---|---|---|---|---|
| 2024 | Kantabanji | Biju Janata Dal | 74,532 | 36.56 | Laxman Bag | Bharatiya Janata Party | 90,876 | 44.57 | Lost | −16,344 | −8.01 |
| 2024 | Hinjili | Biju Janata Dal | 66,459 | 46.85 | Sisir Kumar Mishra | Bharatiya Janata Party | 61,823 | 43.59 | Won | 4,636 | 3.26 |
| 2019 | Bijepur (Note: Patnaik won both Hinjili and Bijepur in May 2019; he resigned from the Bijepur seat on 2 June 2019 and retained Hinjili.) | Biju Janata Dal | 110,604 | 59.78 | Sanat Kumar Gartia | Bharatiya Janata Party | 53,482 | 28.91 | Won | 57,122 | 30.87 |
| 2019 | Hinjili | Biju Janata Dal | 94,065 | 66.32 | Pitambar Acharya | Bharatiya Janata Party | 33,905 | 23.91 | Won | 60,160 | 42.41 |
| 2014 | Hinjili | Biju Janata Dal | 89,267 | 73.14 | Sibaram Patra | Indian National Congress | 12,681 | 10.39 | Won | 76,586 | 62.75 |
| 2009 | Hinjili | Biju Janata Dal | 72,942 | 76.04 | Raghaba Parida | Indian National Congress | 11,669 | 12.17 | Won | 61,273 | 63.87 |
| 2004 | Hinjili | Biju Janata Dal | 62,968 | 72.71 | Udayanath Nayak | Indian National Congress | 20,326 | 23.47 | Won | 42,642 | 49.24 |
| 2000 | Hinjili | Biju Janata Dal | 56,243 | 65.35 | Udayanath Nayak | Indian National Congress | 29,826 | 34.65 | Won | 26,417 | 30.70 |

== Criticisms ==
Patnaik spent most of his early days away from Odisha, so he had problems with writing and speaking fluently in the Odia language. He was the only chief minister of India who did not speak fluently the regional language of his state, and because of this, he faced severe criticism from his opponents. During his tenure, Patnaik had an adequate working knowledge of Odia, and he possessed great mastery over Hindi, French, Punjabi, and English. At rallies, he delivered Odia speeches written in the Roman alphabet.

== Personal life ==
Patnaik is a writer and had spent most of his youth away from both politics and Odisha. However, after his father Biju Patnaik’s demise, he entered politics in 1997 and founded the Biju Janata Dal, named after his father. His mild manner and policies made his party hugely popular in the state. Patnaik is unmarried. He is also one of the founding members of the Indian National Trust for Art and Cultural Heritage. His elder sister was the writer Gita Mehta, who died in 2023.

== Accolades ==
=== Awards ===
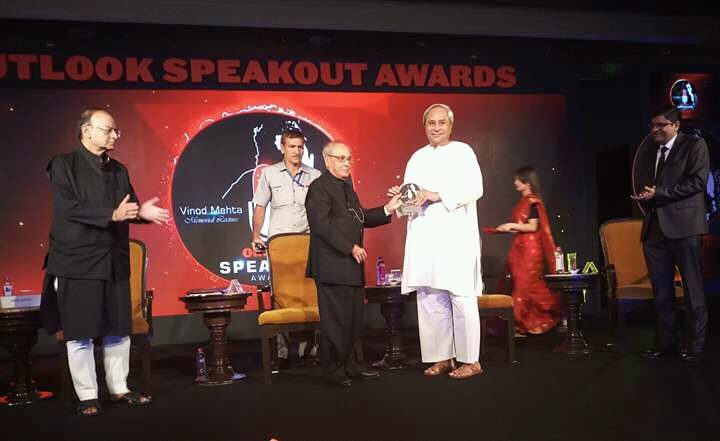
Naveen Patnaik receiving Outlook Speakout Award for Best Administrator from former President of India Pranab Mukherjee in the presence of Arun Jaitley.

| Year | Award | Conferrer | Event/Location |
|---|---|---|---|
| 2013 | United Nations Citation Award | United Nations | Odisha State Secretariat |
| 2017 | Best Administrator in India | Pranab Mukherjee | Outlook India Speakout Awards |
| 2018 | Ideal Chief Minister Award | Pratibha Patil | 8th Indian Students' Parliament |
| 2018 | FIH President's Award | International Hockey Federation | 46th FIH Congress |
| 2020 | CSI E-Ratna Award | Computer Society of India | 53rd CSI Annual Convention |
| 2020 | Hero to Animals Award | PETA | Odisha, India |
| 2022 | Lifetime Achievement Award | N. V. Ramana | Capital Foundation National Awards |

=== Recognitions ===
| Year | Recognition | Organisation | Category | Ref. |
|---|---|---|---|---|
| 2018 | Most Popular Chief Minister in India | India Today | India Today – Mood of the Nation | |
| 2020 | Most Popular Chief Minister in India | Indo-Asian News Service | IANS–C Voter State of the Nation | |
| 2021 | Most Popular Chief Minister in India | India Today | India Today – Mood of the Nation | |
| 2021 | Best Chief Minister in India | ABP News | ABP News–C Voter #DeshKaMood | |
| 2022 | Most Popular Chief Minister in India | India Today | India Today – Mood of the Nation | |
| 2023 | Most Popular Chief Minister in India | India Today | India Today – Mood of the Nation | |
| 2024 | Most Popular Chief Minister in India | India Today | India Today – Mood of the Nation | |
| 2024 | Most Popular Chief Minister in India | NDTV | National Popularity Survey | |
| 2024 | Best Chief Minister in India | ABP News | ABP News–C Voter #DeshKaMood | |

=== Other recognitions ===
- In 2013, the United Nations felicitated Naveen by presenting a citation for his government's handling of Cyclone Phailin, which hit Odisha in October 2013. The body also announced that the state's efforts would be highlighted as a model for disaster management programs globally. Naveen was also invited by the international body to attend the Third UN World Conference on Disaster Risk Reduction (WCDRR) in 2015, which was held in Sendai, Japan, from 14 to 18 March 2015.
- In 2019, the United Nations complimented Naveen for his government's proposal to reserve 33% of seats for women in the National Parliament as well as in the state's Legislative Assembly.

== Writings ==
- A Second Paradise: Indian Courtly Life, 1590-1947 – Published in India, England and US
- A Desert Kingdom: The People of Bikaner – Published in India, England and US
- The Garden of Life: An Introduction to the Healing Plants of India – Published in India, England and US

== See also ==
- List of chief ministers of Odisha
- List of longest-serving Indian chief ministers
- List of prime ministers of India
- List of presidents of India

Political offices
| Preceded by Hemananda Biswal (INC) | Chief Minister of Odisha (5 March 2000 – 12 June 2024) | Succeeded by Mohan Charan Majhi (BJP) |
Political offices
| Preceded by Jayanarayan Mishra (BJP) | Leader of the Opposition, Odisha Legislative Assembly (Since 19 June 2024) | Succeeded by Incumbent |
Party political offices
| Preceded by Office Established | President; Biju Janata Dal (Since 1997) | Succeeded by Incumbent |
State Legislative Assembly
| Preceded by Udayanath Nayak (INC) | Member of the Odisha Legislative Assembly from Hinjili Assembly constituency (Since 2000) | Succeeded by Incumbent |
Lok Sabha
| Preceded by Biju Patnaik (JD) | Member of Parliament from Aska (1998-2000) | Succeeded by Kumudini Patnaik (BJD) |
