= Damodar Rout =

Indian politician

Member of Odisha Legislative Assembly
- In office 2009–2019
- Constituency: Paradeep

Personal details
- Born: 2 July 1942
- Died: 22 March 2024 (aged 81) Bhubaneswar, Odisha
- Party: Biju Janata Dal

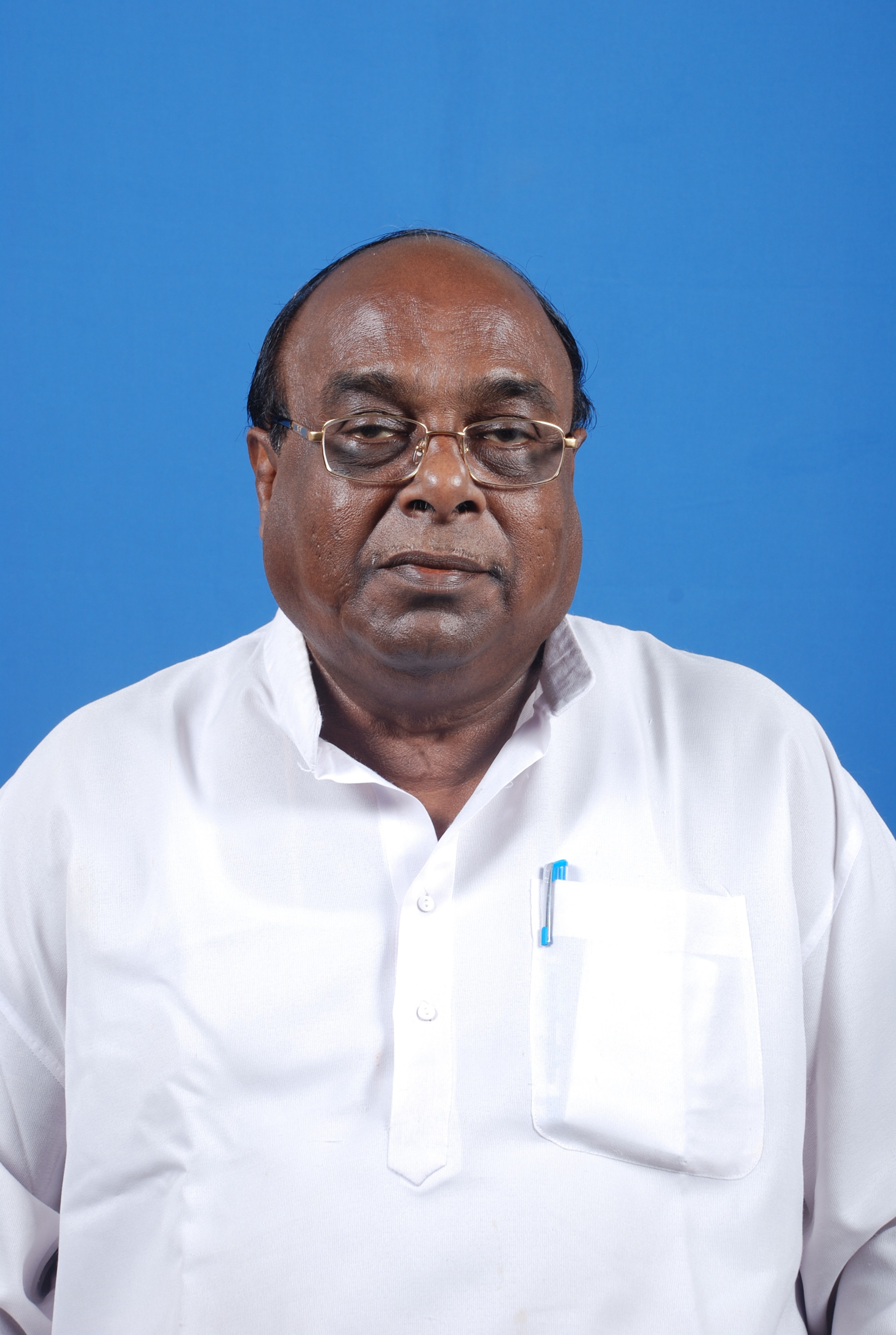
Damodara Rout

Damodar Rout (Died 22 March 2024) was an Indian politician from Odisha. He was a seven time elected Member of the Odisha Legislative Assembly from 2009 and 2014, representing Paradeep Assembly constituency as a Member of the Biju Janata Dal.

== See also ==
- 2009 Odisha Legislative Assembly election
- Odisha Legislative Assembly
