= Ghasipura Assembly constituency =

Constituency of the Odisha legislative assembly in India

Coordinates: 21.21°N 86.11°E

Ghasipura
- Constituency No. 21 for the Odisha Legislative Assembly

Constituency details
- Country: India
- Region: East India
- State: Odisha
- Division: Northern Division
- District: Kendujhar
- Lok Sabha constituency: Keonjhar
- Established: 2009
- Total electors: 2,31,781 (Note: as on 2024) (Note: as data published by election commission)
- Reservation: None

Member of Legislative Assembly
- 17th Odisha Legislative Assembly
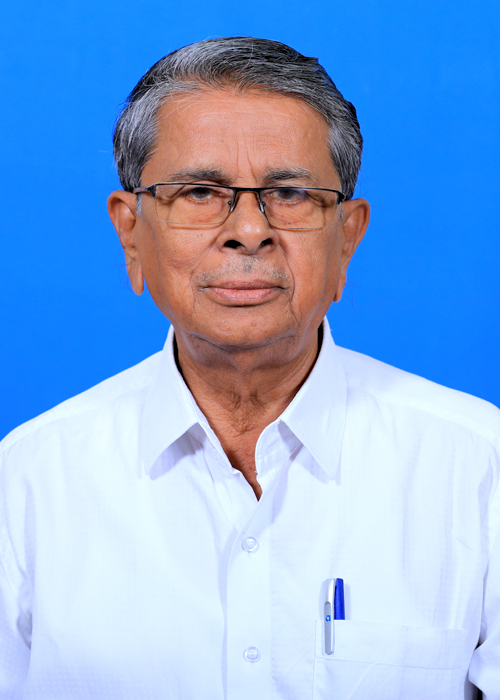
- Incumbent Badri Narayan Patra
- Party: Biju Janata Dal
- Elected year: 2024

Ghasipura is a Vidhan Sabha constituency of Kendujhar district.

Area of this constituency include Ghatgaon, Ghatagaon block, Ghasipura block and 2 GPs (Dhakotha and Kolimati) of Anandapur block.

The constituency was formed in 2008 Delimitation and went for polls in 2009 election.

== Elected members ==
Vote share of winning candidates
2024	43.96%
2019	49.98%
2014	66.03%
2009	52.85%

Since its formation in 2009, 4 elections were held till date.

List of members elected from Ghasipura constituency is:

Year	Member	Party
2024	Badri Narayan Patra	Biju Janata Dal
2019	Badri Narayan Patra	Biju Janata Dal
2014	Badri Narayan Patra	Biju Janata Dal
2009	Badri Narayan Patra	Biju Janata Dal

== Election results ==
=== 2024 ===
Voting were held on 25 May 2024 in 3rd phase of Odisha Assembly Election & 6th phase of Indian General Election. Counting of votes was on 4 June 2024. In 2024 election, Biju Janata Dal candidate Badri Narayan Patra defeated Independent candidate Niranjan Patnaik by a margin of 13,811 votes.

2024 Odisha Vidhan Sabha Election, Ghasipura
Party	Candidate	Votes	%	±%
BJD	Badri Narayan Patra	82,516	43.96	▼6.02
Independent	Soumya Ranjan Patnaik	68,705	29.64	
BJP	Shambhunath Rout	23,813	10.27	▼5.61
Independent	Debendra Nath Swain	2,897	1.54	
INC	Subrat Kumar Chakra	2,807	1.50	▼29.66
NOTA	None of the above	1,844	0.98	▲0.07
Majority		13,811	7.09	
Turnout		1,87,707	80.98	
BJD hold				

=== 2019 ===
In 2019 election, Biju Janata Dal candidate Badri Narayan Patra defeated Indian National Congress candidate Niranjan Patnaik by a margin of 32,668 votes.

2019 Vidhan Sabha Election, Ghasipura
Party	Candidate	Votes	%	±%
BJD	Badri Narayan Patra	86,816	49.98	▼16.55
INC	Niranjan Patnaik	54,128	31.16	▲23.87
BJP	Prithviraj Kuanr	27,579	15.88	▲3.57
NOTA	None of the above	1,579	0.91	
Majority		32,668	18.80	
Turnout		1,73,710	78.78	
BJD hold				

=== 2014 ===
In 2014 election, Biju Janata Dal candidate Badri Narayan Patra defeated Bharatiya Janata Party candidate Satyabrata Panda by a margin of 88,602 votes.

2014 Vidhan Sabha Election, Ghasipura
Party	Candidate	Votes	%	±%
BJD	Badri Narayan Patra	108,900	66.03	▲13.18
BJP	Satyabrata Panda	20,298	12.31	▲5.74
INC	Prithviraj Kuanr	12,018	7.29	▼28.22
NOTA	None	1,856	1.13	
Registered electors		1,97,858		
BJD hold				

=== 2009 ===
In 2009 election, Biju Janata Dal candidate Badri Narayan Patra defeated Indian National Congress candidate Niranjan Patnaik by a margin of 25,554 votes.

2009 Vidhan Sabha Election: Ghasipura
Party	Candidate	Votes	%	±%
BJD	Badri Narayan Patra	77,890	52.85	−
INC	Niranjan Patnaik	52,336	35.51	−
BJP	Santosh Kumar Rout	9,689	6.57	−
Majority		25,554	17.34 (Note: %of total valid votes)	
Turnout		1,47,411	78.06	
BJD win (new seat)				
