= Bharatiya Janata Party – Odisha =

Odisha affiliate of the Bharatiya Janata Party

- Abbreviation: BJP
- Leader: Mohan Charan Majhi (Chief Minister)
- President: Manmohan Samal
- General Secretary: Manas Mohanty (Organization)
- Founder: Atal Bihari Vajpayee; Lal Krishna Advani; Murli Manohar Joshi; Nanaji Deshmukh; K. R. Malkani; Sikandar Bakht; Vijay Kumar Malhotra; Vijaya Raje Scindia; Bhairon Singh Shekhawat; Shanta Kumar; Ram Jethmalani; Jagannathrao Joshi
- Founded: 6 April 1980 (46 years ago)
- Headquarters: 4R-3/2, Unit-3, Janpath, Bhubaneswar-751 001, Odisha
- Colours: Saffron
- ECI status: National Party
- Seats in Rajya Sabha: 5 / 10
- Seats in Lok Sabha: 20 / 21
- Seats in Odisha Legislative Assembly: 79 / 147

Election symbol
- Lotus

Party flag

Website
- www.bjp.org/odisha

The Bharatiya Janata Party – Odisha (BJP Odisha) (BJP; [bʱaːɾët̪iːjë dʒënët̪aː paːrtiː]; lit. 'Indian People's Party'), is the state affiliate unit of the Bharatiya Janata Party operating in Odisha. Its head office is situated at 4R-3/2, Unit-3, Janpath, Bhubaneswar-751 001, Odisha. The state unit's leadership is headed by State President Manmohan Samal, while Mohan Charan Majhi serves as the first Chief Minister from the party following the 2024 state assembly elections.

== Electoral performance ==
=== Lok Sabha elections ===
Year	Election	Seats won	Change (+/-)	Electoral outcome
1984	8th Lok Sabha	0 / 21	Steady	Opposition
1989	9th Lok Sabha	0 / 21	Steady	Opposition
1991	10th Lok Sabha	0 / 21	Steady	Opposition
1996	11th Lok Sabha	0 / 21	Steady	Opposition
1998	12th Lok Sabha	7 / 21	▲7	Government
1999	13th Lok Sabha	9 / 21	▲2	Government
2004	14th Lok Sabha	7 / 21	▼2	Opposition
2009	15th Lok Sabha	0 / 21	▼7	Opposition
2014	16th Lok Sabha	1 / 21	▲1	Government
2019	17th Lok Sabha	8 / 21	▲7	Government
2024	18th Lok Sabha	20 / 21	▲12	Government

=== Legislative Assembly elections ===
Year	Assembly	Seats		Change (+/-)	Vote share	Swing	Electoral outcome
Year	Assembly	Contested	Won	Change (+/-)	Vote share	Swing	Electoral outcome
1985	8th	67	1 / 147	Steady	2.60%	New party	Opposition
1990	9th	63	2 / 147	▲1	3.56%	▲0.96%	Opposition
1995	10th	144	9 / 147	▲7	7.88%	▲4.32%	Opposition
2000	11th	63	38 / 147	▲29	18.20%	▲10.32%	Coalition Government
2004	12th	63	32 / 147	▼6	17.11%	▼2.06%	Coalition Government
2009	13th	147	6 / 147	▼26	15.05%	▼1.09%	Opposition
2014	14th	147	10 / 147	▲4	18.00%	▲2.95%	Opposition
2019	15th	146	23 / 147	▲13	32.50%	▲14.50%	Opposition
2024	16th	147	78 / 147	▲55	40.07%	▲7.57%	Majority Government

== Leadership ==
=== Chief minister ===
#	Portrait	Name	Constituency	Term of office			Assembly
1		Mohan Charan Majhi	Keonjhar	12 June 2024	Incumbent	2 years, 140 days	17th

=== Deputy chief ministers ===
#	Portrait	Name	Constituency	Term of office			Assembly	Chief Minister
1		Kanak Vardhan Singh Deo	Patnagarh	12 June 2024	Incumbent	2 years, 140 days	17th	Mohan Charan Majhi
2		Pravati Parida	Nimapara	12 June 2024	Incumbent	2 years, 140 days	17th	Mohan Charan Majhi

=== Leaders of the Opposition in the Legislative Assembly ===
#	Portrait	Name	Constituency	Term of office			Assembly	Chief Minister
1		Pradipta Kumar Naik	Bhawanipatna	25 June 2019	30 July 2022	3 years, 35 days	16th	Naveen Patnaik
2		Jayanarayan Mishra	Sambalpur	30 July 2022	4 June 2024	1 year, 310 days	16th	Naveen Patnaik

=== Members of Parliament ===
Lok Sabha	Election year	Constituency	Name of elected MP	Notes
18th Lok Sabha	2024	Asika	Anita Subhadarshini	
18th Lok Sabha	2024	Baleshwar	Pratap Chandra Sarangi	
18th Lok Sabha	2024	Baragada	Pradeep Purohit	
18th Lok Sabha	2024	Brahmapur	Pradeep Kumar Panigrahy	
18th Lok Sabha	2024	Bhadrak	Avimanyu Sethi	
18th Lok Sabha	2024	Bhubaneswar	Aparajita Sarangi	
18th Lok Sabha	2024	Balangir	Sangeeta Kumari Singh Deo	
18th Lok Sabha	2024	Kataka	Bhartruhari Mahtab	Served as the Pro-tem Speaker of the 18th Lok Sabha
18th Lok Sabha	2024	Dhenkanal	Rudra Narayan Pany	
18th Lok Sabha	2024	Jagatsinghpur	Bibhu Prasad Tarai	
18th Lok Sabha	2024	Jajpur	Rabindra Narayan Behera	
18th Lok Sabha	2024	Kalahandi	Malvika Devi	
18th Lok Sabha	2024	Kandhamal	Sukanta Kumar Panigrahi	
18th Lok Sabha	2024	Kendrapada	Baijayant Panda	
18th Lok Sabha	2024	Kendujhar	Ananta Nayak	
18th Lok Sabha	2024	Mayurbhanj	Naba Charan Majhi	
18th Lok Sabha	2024	Nabarangpur	Balabhadra Majhi	
18th Lok Sabha	2024	Puri	Sambit Patra	
18th Lok Sabha	2024	Sambalpur	Dharmendra Pradhan	Appointed Union Cabinet Minister of Education
18th Lok Sabha	2024	Sundaragada	Jual Oram	Appointed Union Cabinet Minister of Tribal Affairs
17th Lok Sabha	2019	Balasore	Pratap Chandra Sarangi	Served as Minister of State for MSME, Animal Husbandry, Dairying and Fisheries
17th Lok Sabha	2019	Bargarh	Suresh Pujari	
17th Lok Sabha	2019	Bhubaneswar	Aparajita Sarangi	
17th Lok Sabha	2019	Bolangir	Sangeeta Kumari Singh Deo	
17th Lok Sabha	2019	Kalahandi	Basanta Kumar Panda	
17th Lok Sabha	2019	Mayurbhanj	Bisweshwar Tudu	Served as Minister of State for Tribal Affairs and Jal Shakti
17th Lok Sabha	2019	Sambalpur	Nitesh Gangadeb	
17th Lok Sabha	2019	Sundargarh	Jual Oram	
16th Lok Sabha	2014	Sundargarh	Jual Oram	Served as Union Cabinet Minister of Tribal Affairs
15th Lok Sabha	2009	None (No seats won)		
14th Lok Sabha	2004	Balasore	Kharabela Swain	
14th Lok Sabha	2004	Bolangir	Sangeeta Kumari Singh Deo	
14th Lok Sabha	2004	Deogarh	Dharmendra Pradhan	
14th Lok Sabha	2004	Keonjhar	Ananta Nayak	
14th Lok Sabha	2004	Nabarangpur	Parsuram Majhi	
14th Lok Sabha	2004	Kalahandi	Bikram Keshari Deo	
14th Lok Sabha	2004	Sundargarh	Jual Oram	
13th Lok Sabha	1999	Balasore	Kharabela Swain	
13th Lok Sabha	1999	Berhampur	Anadi Charan Sahu	
13th Lok Sabha	1999	Bolangir	Sangeeta Kumari Singh Deo	
13th Lok Sabha	1999	Deogarh	Debendra Pradhan	
13th Lok Sabha	1999	Kalahandi	Bikram Keshari Deo	
13th Lok Sabha	1999	Keonjhar	Ananta Nayak	
13th Lok Sabha	1999	Mayurbhanj	Salkhan Murmu	
13th Lok Sabha	1999	Nabarangpur	Parsuram Majhi	
13th Lok Sabha	1999	Sundargarh	Jual Oram	Served as Union Cabinet Minister of Tribal Affairs
12th Lok Sabha	1998	Balasore	Kharabela Swain	First ever Lok Sabha seat won by BJP in Balasore
12th Lok Sabha	1998	Bolangir	Sangeeta Kumari Singh Deo	First ever Lok Sabha seat won by BJP in Bolangir
12th Lok Sabha	1998	Deogarh	Debendra Pradhan	Served as Minister of State for Surface Transport
12th Lok Sabha	1998	Kalahandi	Bikram Keshari Deo	First ever Lok Sabha seat won by BJP in Kalahandi
12th Lok Sabha	1998	Keonjhar	Upendra Nath Nayak	First ever Lok Sabha seat won by BJP in Keonjhar
12th Lok Sabha	1998	Mayurbhanj	Salkhan Murmu	First ever Lok Sabha seat won by BJP in Mayurbhanj
12th Lok Sabha	1998	Sundargarh	Jual Oram	First ever Lok Sabha seat won by BJP in Sundargarh
7th to 11th	1980–1996	None (No seats won)		

=== Presidents ===
#	Portrait	Name	Term of office		
1		Biswabhusan Harichandan	12 April 1980	24 February 1988	7 years, 318 days
2		Debendra Pradhan	24 February 1988	15 May 1993	5 years, 80 days
3		Bimbadhar Kuanr	15 May 1993	12 June 1996	3 years, 28 days
(2)		Debendra Pradhan	12 June 1996	18 May 1997	340 days
4		Jual Oram	18 May 1997	14 November 1999	2 years, 180 days
5		Manmohan Samal	14 November 1999	18 May 2004	4 years, 186 days
(4)		Jual Oram	18 May 2004	7 November 2006	2 years, 173 days
6		Suresh Pujari	7 November 2006	22 December 2009	3 years, 45 days
(4)		Jual Oram	22 December 2009	10 March 2013	3 years, 78 days
7		Kanak Vardhan Singh Deo	10 March 2013	14 January 2016	2 years, 310 days
8		Basanta Kumar Panda	14 January 2016	16 January 2020	4 years, 2 days
9		Samir Mohanty	16 January 2020	23 March 2023	3 years, 66 days
(5)		Manmohan Samal	24 March 2023	Incumbent	3 years, 220 days

== See also ==
- Bharatiya Janata Party
- National Democratic Alliance
