= 2024 Indian general election in Odisha =

Election for lower house of Parliament of India

- 13 May - 1 June 2024

All 21 Odisha seats in the Lok Sabha
- Opinion polls
- Turnout: 74.78% (▲1.58 pp)
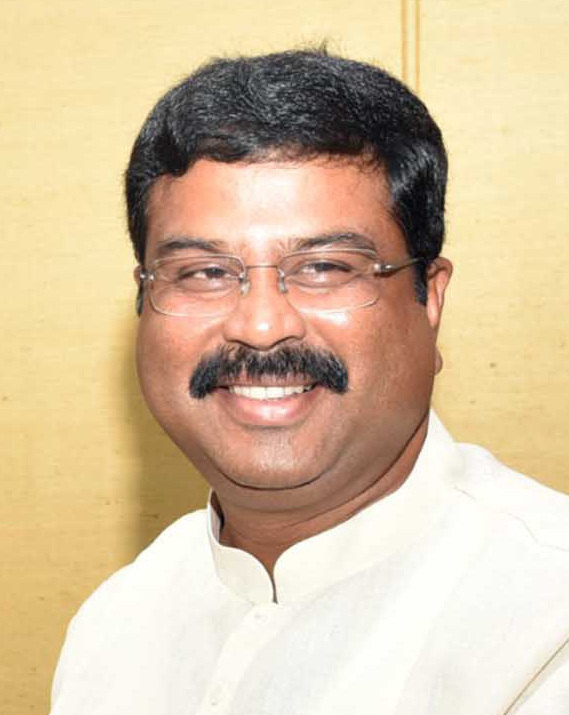

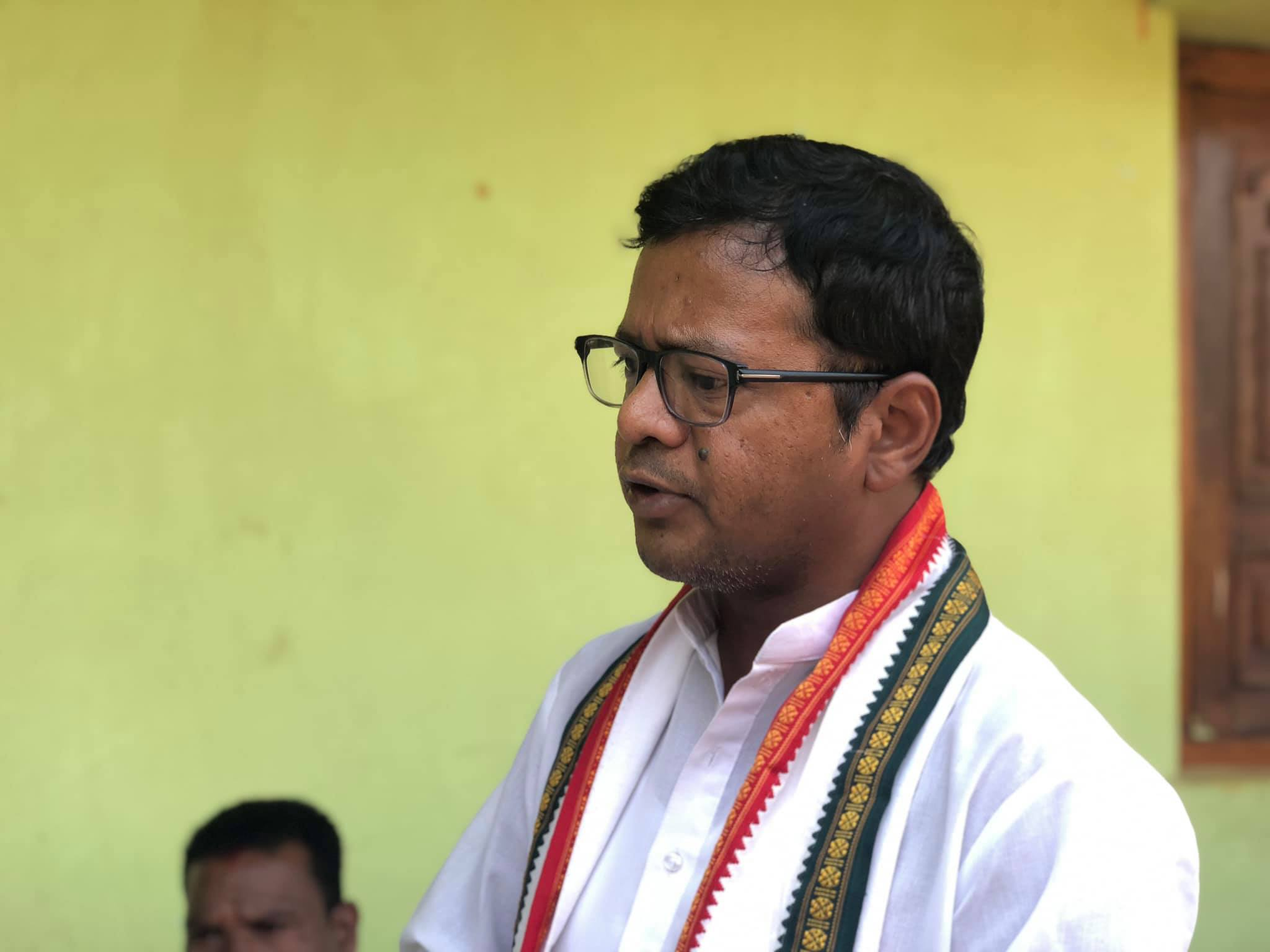

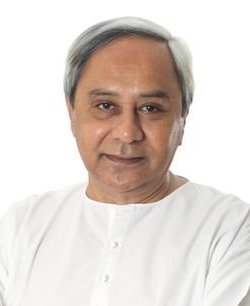
	First party	Second party	Third party
Leader	Dharmendra Pradhan	Saptagiri Sankar Ulaka	Naveen Patnaik
Party	BJP	INC	BJD
Alliance	NDA	INDIA	-
Leader since	2021	2019	1996
Leader's seat	Sambalpur (won)	Koraput (won)	Did not contest
Last election	38.4%, 8 seats	13.4%, 1 seat	42.8%, 12 seats
Seats won	20	1	0
Seat change	▲12	Steady	▼12
Popular vote	11,335,549	3,264,769	9,382,711
Percentage	45.34%	13.06%	37.53%
Swing	▲6.94 pp	▼1.74 pp	▼5.27 pp
Prime Minister before election
Narendra Modi
BJP
Elected Prime Minister
Narendra Modi
BJP

The 2024 Indian general election was held in Odisha in 4 phases from 13 May 2024 to 1 June 2024 to elect 21 members of the 18th Lok Sabha.

Bharatiya Janata Party clean swept the state by winning 20 out of 21 seats. Indian National Congress won the Koraput seat.

== Election schedule ==
Phase wise schedule of 2024 Indian general election in Odisha

Poll event	Phase			
Poll event	IV	V	VI	VII
Notification date	18 April	26 April	29 April	7 May
Last date for filing nomination	25 April	3 May	6 May	14 May
Scrutiny of nomination	26 April	4 May	7 May	15 May
Last Date for withdrawal of nomination	29 April	6 May	9 May	17 May
Date of poll	13 May	20 May	25 May	1 June
Date of counting of votes/Result	4 June 2024			
No. of constituencies	4	5	6	6

== Parties and alliances ==
=== National Democratic Alliance ===
National Democratic Alliance

Party	Flag	Symbol	Leader	Seats contested
Bharatiya Janata Party			Dharmendra Pradhan	21

=== Biju Janata Dal ===
Biju Janata Dal

Party	Flag	Symbol	Leader	Seats contested
Biju Janata Dal			Naveen Patnaik	21

=== Indian National Developmental Inclusive Alliance ===
Indian National Developmental Inclusive Alliance

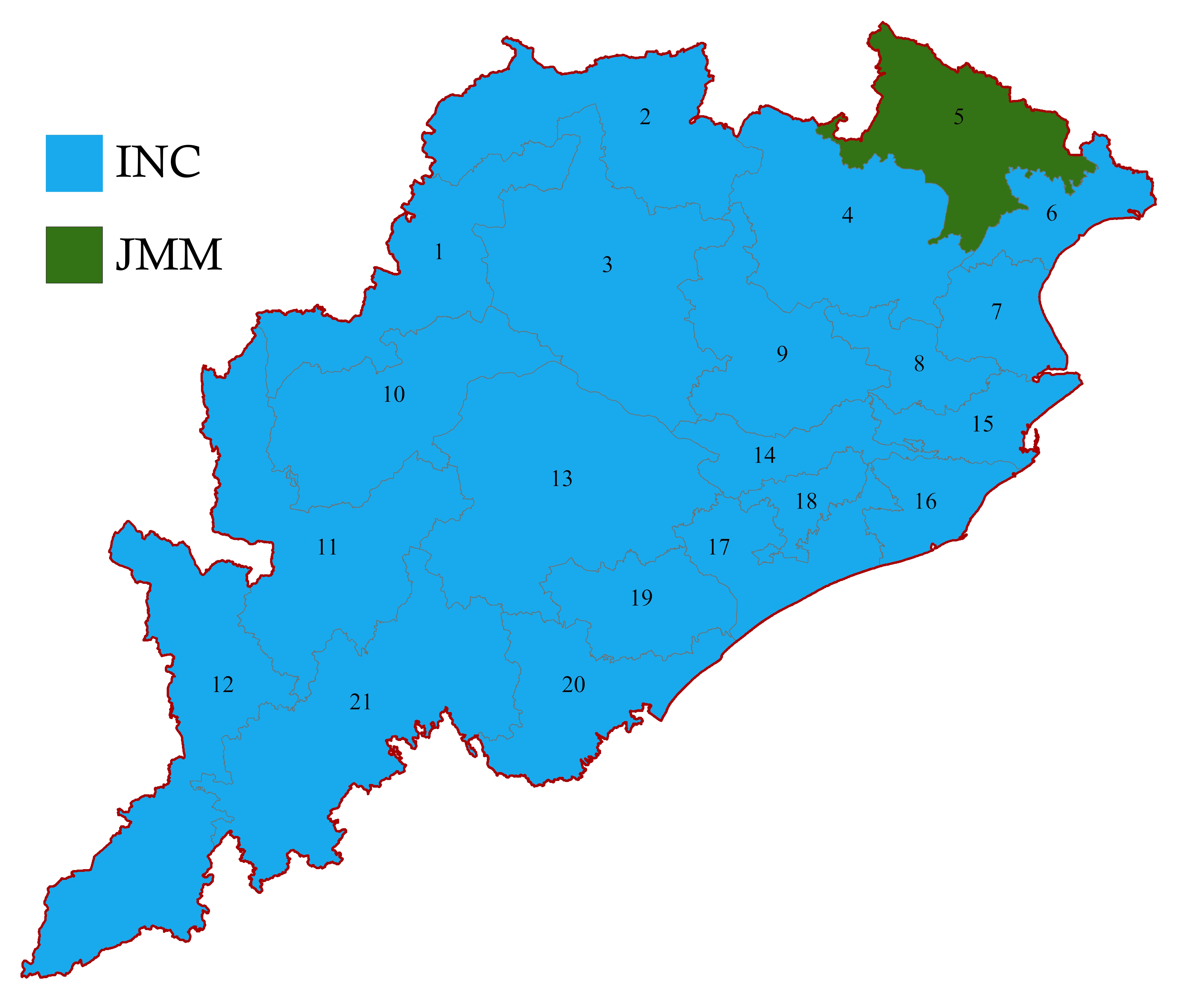
INDIA bloc seat sharing in Odisha

Party	Flag	Symbol	Leader	Seats contested
Indian National Congress			Saptagiri Sankar Ulaka	20
Jharkhand Mukti Morcha	JMM flag		Anjani Soren	1
Total				21

=== Others ===
Party	Flag	Symbol	Leader	Seats contested
Communist Party of India (Marxist)			Ali Kishore Patnaik	1
Communist Party of India			Abhaya Sahu	1

== Candidates ==
Constituency							
Constituency		BJD		NDA		INDIA	
1	Bargarh	BJD	Parinita Mishra	BJP	Pradip Purohit	INC	Sanjay Bhoi
2	Sundargarh (ST)	BJD	Dilip Kumar Tirkey	BJP	Jual Oram	INC	Janardan Dehury
3	Sambalpur	BJD	Pranab Prakash Das	BJP	Dharmendra Pradhan	INC	Nagendra Kumar Pradhan
4	Keonjhar (ST)	BJD	Dhanurjaya Sidu	BJP	Ananta Nayak	INC	Binod Bihari Nayak
5	Mayurbhanj (ST)	BJD	Sudam Marndi	BJP	Naba Charan Majhi	JMM	Anjani Soren
6	Balasore	BJD	Lekhashree Samantsinghar	BJP	Pratap Chandra Sarangi	INC	Srikant Kumar Jena
7	Bhadrak (SC)	BJD	Manjulata Mandal	BJP	Avimanyu Sethi	INC	Ananta Prasad Sethi
8	Jajpur (SC)	BJD	Sarmistha Sethi	BJP	Rabindra Narayan Behera	INC	Anchal Das
9	Dhenkanal	BJD	Avinash Samal	BJP	Rudra Narayan Pany	INC	Sashmita Behera
10	Bolangir	BJD	Surendra Singh Bhoi	BJP	Sangeeta Kumari Singh Deo	INC	Manoj Mishra
11	Kalahandi	BJD	Lambodhar Nial	BJP	Malvika Devi	INC	Draupadi Majhi
12	Nabarangpur (ST)	BJD	Pradeep Majhi	BJP	Balabhadra Majhi	INC	Bhujabal Majhi
13	Kandhamal	BJD	Achyuta Samanta	BJP	Sukanta Kumar Panigrahi	INC	Amir Chand Nayak
14	Cuttack	BJD	Santrupt Mishra	BJP	Bhartruhari Mahtab	INC	Suresh Mohapatra
15	Kendrapara	BJD	Anshuman Mohanty	BJP	Baijayant Panda	INC	Sidharth Swarup Das
16	Jagatsinghpur (SC)	BJD	Rajashree Mallick	BJP	Bibhu Prasad Tarai	INC	Rabindra Kumar Sethy
17	Puri	BJD	Arup Patnaik	BJP	Sambit Patra	INC	Jay Narayan Patnaik
18	Bhubaneswar	BJD	Manmath Routray	BJP	Aparajita Sarangi	INC	Yasir Nawaj
19	Aska	BJD	Ranjita Sahu	BJP	Anita Subhadarshini	INC	Debokanta Sharma
20	Berhampur	BJD	Bhrugu Baxipatra	BJP	Pradeep Kumar Panigrahi	INC	Rashmi Ranjan Patnaik
21	Koraput (ST)	BJD	Kausalya Hikaka	BJP	Kaliram Majhi	INC	Saptagiri Sankar Ulaka

== Surveys and polls ==
=== Opinion Polls ===
Polling agency	Date published	Margin of error				Lead
Polling agency	Date published	Margin of error	BJD	NDA	INDIA	Lead
ABP News-CVoter	March 2024	±5%	11	10	0	BJD
India TV-CNX	March 2024	±3%	11	10	0	BJD
India Today-CVoter	February 2024	±3-5%	11	10	0	BJD
Times Now-ETG	December 2023	±3%	13-15	5-7	0-1	BJD
India TV-CNX	October 2023	±3%	13	8	0	BJD
Times Now-ETG	September 2023	±3%	13-15	5-7	0-1	BJD
Times Now-ETG	August 2023	±3%	12-14	6-8	0-1	BJD

Polling agency	Date published	Margin of error					Lead
Polling agency	Date published	Margin of error	BJD	NDA	INDIA	Others	Lead
ABP News-CVoter	March 2024	±5%	40.9%	40.2%	13.8%	5.1%	0.7
India Today-CVoter	February 2024	±3-5%	41%	40%	12%	7%	1

=== Exit Polls ===
Polling agency					Lead
Polling agency	NDA	BJD	INDIA	Others	Lead
India Today-Axis My India	18-20	0-2	0-1	0	NDA
Jan Ki Baat	15-18	3-7	0	0	NDA
ABP-CVoter	17-19	1-3	0-2	0	NDA
India TV-CNX	15-17	4-6	0-1	0	NDA
News 24-Today's Chanakya	16	4	1	0	NDA
News Nation	14	6	1	0	NDA
Pratik - Classification	20	0	1	0	NDA
Dainik Bhaskar	14-15	6-7	0-1	0	NDA
DB Live	6–8	12-14	0–1	0	BJD
News18 Mega Exit Polls	13-15	6-8	0	0	NDA
India News-Dynamics	13	8	0	0	NDA
Times Now-ETG	13	8	0	0	NDA
Republic-PMarq	12	8	1	0	NDA
Republic Bharat-Matrize	9-12	7-10	0-1	0	NDA
TV9 Bharatvarsh- People's Insight - Polstrat	13	1		7	NDA
2019 results	8	12	1	0	BJD
Actual results	20	0	1	0	NDA

== Voter turnout ==
=== Phase wise ===
Phase	Poll date	Constituencies	Voter turnout (%)
IV	13 May 2024	Kalahandi, Nabarangpur, Berhampur, Koraput	75.68%
V	20 May 2024	Bargarh, Sundargarh, Bolangir, Kandhamal, Aska	73.50%
VI	25 May 2024	Sambalpur, Keonjhar, Dhenkanal, Cuttack, Puri, Bhubaneswar	74.45%
VII	1 June 2024	Mayurbhanj, Balasore, Bhadrak, Jajpur, Kendrapara, Jagatsinghpur	74.41%
Total			74.44%

=== Constituency wise ===
Constituency		Poll date	Turnout	Swing
1	Bargarh	20 May 2024	79.78%	1.41% ▲
2	Sundargarh (ST)	20 May 2024	73.02%	1.13% ▲
3	Sambalpur	25 May 2024	79.50%	2.78% ▲
4	Keonjhar (ST)	25 May 2024	78.97%	1.40% ▲
5	Mayurbhanj (ST)	1 June 2024	75.79%	1.34% ▼
6	Balasore	1 June 2024	76.77%	1.08% ▲
7	Bhadrak (SC)	1 June 2024	73.23%	0.67% ▼
8	Jajpur (SC)	1 June 2024	74.47%	0.37% ▲
9	Dhenkanal	25 May 2024	78.01%	2.68% ▲
10	Bolangir	20 May 2024	77.52%	2.61% ▲
11	Kalahandi	13 May 2024	77.90%	1.49% ▲
12	Nabarangpur (ST)	13 May 2024	82.16%	2.64% ▲
13	Kandhamal	20 May 2024	74.13%	1.03% ▲
14	Cuttack	25 May 2024	71.20%	1.39% ▲
15	Kendrapara	1 June 2024	71.22%	1.17% ▼
16	Jagatsinghpur (SC)	1 June 2024	75.48%	0.65% ▲
17	Puri	25 May 2024	75.43%	2.71% ▲
18	Bhubaneswar	25 May 2024	64.49%	5.32% ▲
19	Aska	20 May 2024	62.67%	3.12% ▼
20	Berhampur	13 May 2024	65.41%	0.49% ▼
21	Koraput (ST)	13 May 2024	77.53%	2.19% ▲

== Results ==
=== Results by alliance or party ===
Alliance/ Party		Popular vote			Seats		
Alliance/ Party		Votes	%	±pp	Contested	Won	+/−
NDA	BJP	1,13,35,549	45.34	▲6.94%	21	20	▲12
BJD		93,82,711	37.53	▼5.27%	21	0	▼12
INDIA	INC	31,30,056	12.52	▼0.88%	20	1	Steady
INDIA	JMM	1,34,713	0.54	▼0.04%	1	0	Steady
INDIA	Total	32,64,769	13.06	▼1.74%	21	1	Steady
Others		6,50,336	2.60				Steady
NOTA		3,24,588	1.30				
Total			100%	Steady		21	Steady

=== Results by regions ===
Regions	Seats				
Regions	Seats	NDA	BJD	INDIA	Others
Northern Odisha	5	5	0	0	0
Central Odisha	10	10	0	0	0
Southern Odisha	6	5	0	1	0
Total	21	20	0	1	0

=== Results by constituency ===
Constituency			Winner				Runner Up				Margin	%
#	Name	Poll %	Candidate	Party	Votes	%	Candidate	Party	Votes	%	Margin	%
1	Bargarh	79.78▲	Pradip Purohit	BJP	7,16,359	54.69	Parinita Mishra	BJD	4,64,692	34.58	2,51,667	20.11
2	Sundargarh (ST)	73.02▲	Jual Oram	BJP	4,94,282	42.77	Dilip Kumar Tirkey	BJD	3,55,474	30.76	1,38,808	12.01
3	Sambalpur	79.50▲	Dharmendra Pradhan	BJP	5,92,162	49.48	Pranab Prakash Das	BJD	4,72,326	39.47	1,19,836	10.01
4	Keonjhar (ST)	78.97▲	Ananta Nayak	BJP	5,73,923	45.67	Dhanurjaya Sidu	BJD	4,76,881	37.95	97,042	7.72
5	Mayurbhanj (ST)	75.79▼	Naba Charan Majhi	BJP	5,85,971	49.91	Sudam Marndi	BJD	3,66,637	31.23	2,19,334	18.68
6	Balasore	76.77▲	Pratap Chandra Sarangi	BJP	5,63,865	45.49	Lekhashree Samantsinghar	BJD	4,16,709	33.62	1,47,156	11.87
7	Bhadrak (SC)	73.23▼	Avimanyu Sethi	BJP	5,73,319	44.19	Manjulata Mandal	BJD	4,81,775	37.13	91,544	7.06
8	Jajpur (SC)	74.47▲	Rabindra Narayan Behera	BJP	5,34,239	46.01	Sarmistha Sethi	BJD	5,32,652	45.87	1,587	0.14
9	Dhenkanal	78.01▲	Rudra Narayan Pany	BJP	5,98,721	50.24	Avinash Samal	BJD	5,22,154	43.82	76,567	6.42
10	Bolangir	77.52▲	Sangeeta Kumari Singh Deo	BJP	6,17,744	44.12	Surendra Singh Bhoi	BJD	4,85,080	34.64	1,32,664	9.48
11	Kalahandi	77.90▲	Malvika Devi	BJP	5,44,303	40.79	Lambodhar Nial	BJD	4,10,490	30.77	1,33,813	10.02
12	Nabarangpur (ST)	82.16▲	Balabhadra Majhi	BJP	4,81,396	38.74	Pradeep Majhi	BJD	3,93,860	31.70	87,536	7.04
13	Kandhamal	74.13▲	Sukanta Kumar Panigrahi	BJP	4,16,415	41.80	Achyutananda Samanta	BJD	3,95,044	39.66	21,371	2.14
14	Cuttack	71.20▲	Bhartruhari Mahtab	BJP	5,31,601	47.43	Santrupt Mishra	BJD	4,74,524	42.34	57,077	5.09
15	Kendrapara	71.22▼	Baijayant Panda	BJP	6,15,705	48.21	Anshuman Mohanty	BJD	5,49,169	43.00	66,536	5.21
16	Jagatsinghpur (SC)	75.48▲	Bibhu Prasad Tarai	BJP	5,89,093	45.80	Rajashree Mallick	BJD	5,48,397	42.63	40,696	3.17
17	Puri	75.43▲	Sambit Patra	BJP	6,29,330	52.58	Arup Mohan Patnaik	BJD	5,24,621	43.83	1,04,709	8.75
18	Bhubaneswar	64.49▲	Aparajita Sarangi	BJP	5,12,519	47.36	Manmath Routray	BJD	4,77,367	44.11	35,152	3.25
19	Aska	62.67▼	Anita Subhadarshini	BJP	4,94,226	48.55	Ranjita Sahu	BJD	3,94,252	38.73	99,974	9.82
20	Berhampur	65.41▼	Pradeep Kumar Panigrahy	BJP	5,13,102	49.20	Bhrugu Baxipatra	BJD	3,47,626	33.33	1,65,476	15.87
21	Koraput (ST)	77.53▲	Saptagiri Sankar Ulaka	INC	4,71,393	41.03	Kausalya Hikaka	BJD	3,23,649	28.17	1,47,744	12.86

== Assembly segments wise lead of Parties ==
2024 Odisha Lok Sabha Elections Assembly Wise Leads Map

Party	Assembly segment wise lead	Result of 2024 Odisha Assembly election
Bharatiya Janata Party	111	78
Biju Janata Dal	26	51
Indian National Congress	10	14
Communist Party of India (Marxist)	0	1
Independent	0	3
Total	147	

== See also ==
- 2024 Indian general election in Puducherry
- 2024 Indian general election in Punjab
- 2024 Indian general election in Rajasthan
