= 2009 Indian general election in Orissa =

- April 16, April 23

21 seats
- Registered: 27,194,864
- Turnout: 65.35%

	First party	Second party	Third party
Party	BJD	INC	CPI
Alliance	Third Front	UPA	Third Front
Last election	11	2	0
Seats won	14	6	1
Seat change	▲3	▲4	▲1
Percentage	37.23%	32.75%	2.57%
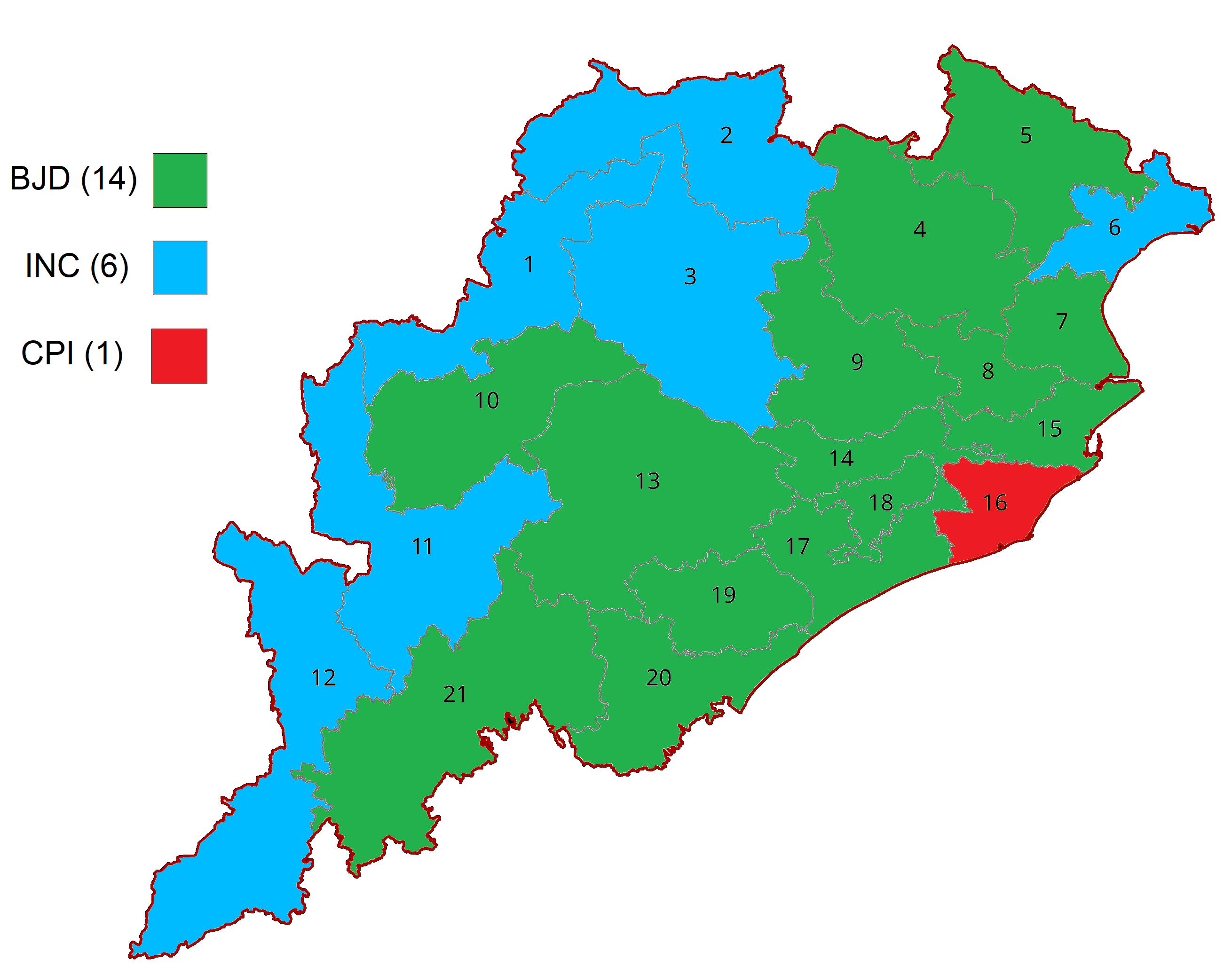
Prime Minister before election
Manmohan Singh
INC
Prime Minister after election
Manmohan Singh
INC

The 2009 Indian general election in Orissa were held for 21 seats with the state going to the polls in the first two phases of the general elections. The major contenders in the state were the Third Front, Indian National Congress and the Bharatiya Janata Party (BJP). The third front parties contesting in the state were the Biju Janata Dal (BJD), the Left parties and the Nationalist Congress Party. The assembly elections were held simultaneously with the general elections in the state.

A few weeks before the elections, seat sharing talks broke down between the BJD and its long-time ally BJP. Then the BJD joined the Third Front. The BJD leader Naveen Patnaik said that he broke the alliance with BJP over the Kandhamal riots.

== Parties and alliances ==
=== Third Front ===
Third Front
Party	Flag	Symbol	Leader	Seats
Biju Janata Dal			Naveen Patnaik	18
Communist Party of India (Marxist)			Salomi Minz	1
Communist Party of India			Bibhu Prasad Tarai	1
Nationalist Congress Party			Arun Dey	1
Total				21

=== National Democratic Alliance ===
Party	Flag	Symbol	Leader	Seats contested
Bharatiya Janata Party			Jual Oram	21

=== United Progressive Alliance ===
Party	Flag	Symbol	Leader	Seats contested
Indian National Congress			Kamakhya Prasad Singh Deo	21

== List of Candidates ==
Constituency		BJD+		UPA		BJP	
#	Name	Party	Candidate	Party	Candidate	Party	Candidate
1	Bargarh	BJD	Dr. Hamid Hussain	INC	Sanjay Bhoi	BJP	Radharani Panda
2	Sundargarh	CPM	Salomi Minz	INC	Hemananda Biswal	BJP	Jual Oram
3	Sambalpur	BJD	Rohit Pujari	INC	Amarnath Pradhan	BJP	Surendra Lath
4	Keonjhar	BJD	Yashbant Narayan Laguri	INC	Dhanurjaya Sidu	BJP	Ananta Nayak
5	Mayurbhanj	BJD	Laxman Tudu	INC	Laxman Majhi	BJP	Droupadi Murmu
6	Balasore	NCP	Arun Dey	INC	Srikant Kumar Jena	BJP	M. A. Kharabela Swain
7	Bhadrak	BJD	Arjun Charan Sethi	INC	Ananta Prasad Sethi	BJP	Ratha Das
8	Jajpur	BJD	Mohan Jena	INC	Amiya Kanta Mallik	BJP	Parameswar Sethi
9	Dhenkanal	BJD	Tathagata Satpathy	INC	Chandra Sekhar Tripathi	BJP	Rudra Narayan Pany
10	Bolangir	BJD	Kalikesh Narayan Deo	INC	Narasingha Mishra	BJP	Sangeeta Kumari Deo
11	Kalahandi	BJD	Subash Chandra Nayak	INC	Bhakta Charan Das	BJP	Bikram Keshari Deo
12	Nabarangpur	BJD	Domburu Majhi	INC	Pradeep Kumar Majhi	BJP	Parsuram Majhi
13	Kandhamal	BJD	Rudra Madhab Ray	INC	Sujit Kumar Padhi	BJP	Ashok Sahu
14	Cuttack	BJD	Bhartruhari Mahtab	INC	Bibhuti Bhusan Mishra	BJP	Anadi Charan Sahu
15	Kendrapara	BJD	Baijayant Panda	INC	Ranjib Biswal	BJP	Jnandev Beura
16	Jagatsinghpur	CPI	Bibhu Prasad Tarai	INC	Rabindra Kumar Sethy	BJP	Baidhar Mallick
17	Puri	BJD	Pinaki Misra	INC	Debendra Nath Mansingh	BJP	Braja Kishore Tripathy
18	Bhubaneswar	BJD	Prasanna Patasani	INC	Santosh Mohanty	BJP	Archana Nayak
19	Aska	BJD	Nityananda Pradhan	INC	Ramchandra Rath	BJP	Shanti Devi
20	Berhampur	BJD	Sidhant Mohapatra	INC	Chandra Sekhar Sahu	BJP	Bharat Paik
21	Koraput	BJD	Jayaram Pangi	INC	Giridhar Gamang	BJP	Upendra Majhi

== Result by Party/Alliance ==
Alliance/ Party		Popular vote			Seats		
Alliance/ Party		Votes	%	±pp	Contested	Won	+/−
BJD+	BJD	66,12,552	37.23	▲7.21	18	14	▲3
BJD+	NCP	2,74,988	1.55	Steady	1	0	Steady
BJD+	CPI	4,57,234	2.57	Steady	1	1	▲1
BJD+	CPI(M)	71,582	0.40	Steady	1	0	Steady
BJD+	Total	74,16,356	41.75	Steady	21	15	Steady
INC		58,16,904	32.75	▼7.68	21	6	▲4
BJP		29,99,520	16.89	▼2.41	21	0	▼7
Others		11,16,174	6.28	Steady	59	0	Steady
IND		4,13,030	2.33	▼2.17	35	0	Steady
Total		1,77,61,984	100%	-	157	21	-

== Voting and results ==
Source: Election Commission of India
Constituency		Winner				Runner Up				Margin	%
#	Name	Candidate	Party	Votes	%	Candidate	Party	Votes	%	Margin	%
1	Bargarh	Sanjay Bhoi	INC	397,375	43.21	Hamid Hussain	BJD	298,931	32.51	98,444	10.70
2	Sundargarh	Hemananda Biswal	INC	280,054	36.53	Jual Oram	BJP	268,430	35.01	11,624	1.52
3	Sambalpur	Amarnath Pradhan	INC	304,890	38.09	Rohit Pujari	BJD	290,016	36.23	14,874	1.86
4	Keonjhar	Yashbant Narayan	BJD	389,104	43.63	Dhanurjaya Sidu	INC	262,620	29.45	126,484	14.18
5	Mayurbhanj	Laxman Tudu	BJD	256,648	31.12	Sudam Marndi	JMM	190,470	23.09	66,178	8.03
6	Balasore	Srikant Kumar Jena	INC	313,888	35.18	Arun Dey	NCP	274,988	30.82	38,900	4.36
7	Bhadrak	Arjun Charan Sethi	BJD	416,808	44.86	Ananta Prasad Sethi	INC	361,870	38.95	54,938	5.91
8	Jajpur	Mohan Jena	BJD	433,350	53.03	Amiya Kanta Mallik	INC	305,603	37.40	127,747	15.63
9	Dhenkanal	Tathagata Satpathy	BJD	398,568	46.53	Chandra Sekhar Tripathi	INC	211,981	24.75	186,587	21.78
10	Bolangir	Kalikesh Narayan Deo	BJD	430,150	42.50	Narasingha Mishra	INC	339,315	33.53	90,835	8.97
11	Kalahandi	Bhakta Charan Das	INC	401,736	41.06	Subash Chandra Nayak	BJD	247,699	25.32	154,037	15.74
12	Nabarangpur	Pradeep Kumar Majhi	INC	308,307	38.93	Domburu Majhi	BJD	278,330	35.15	29,977	3.78
13	Kandhamal	Rudramadhab Ray	BJD	315,314	44.55	Suzit Kumar Padhi	INC	164,307	23.22	151,007	21.33
14	Cuttack	Bhartruhari Mahtab	BJD	465,089	57.17	Bibhuti Bhusan Mishra	INC	228,797	28.13	236,292	29.04
15	Kendrapara	Baijayant Panda	BJD	502,635	51.13	Ranjib Biswal	INC	375,528	38.20	127,107	12.93
16	Jagatsinghpur	Bibhu Prasad Tarai	CPI	457,234	46.50	Rabindra Kumar Sethy	INC	380,499	38.70	76,735	7.80
17	Puri	Pinaki Misra	BJD	436,961	48.01	Debendra Nath Mansingh	INC	225,656	24.79	211,305	23.22
18	Bhubaneswar	Prasanna Patasani	BJD	400,472	56.32	Santosh Mohanty	INC	147,712	20.77	252,760	35.55
19	Aska	Nityananda Pradhan	BJD	419,862	59.82	Ramachandra Rath	INC	187,028	26.65	232,834	33.17
20	Berhampur	Sidhant Mohapatra	BJD	319,839	44.99	Chandra Sekhar Sahu	INC	262,552	36.93	57,287	8.06
21	Koraput	Jayaram Pangi	BJD	312,776	41.18	Giridhar Gamang	INC	216,416	28.49	96,360	12.69

== Post-election Union Council of Ministers from Orissa ==
#	Name	Constituency	Designation	Department	From	To	Party
1	Srikant Kumar Jena	Balasore	MoS	Chemicals and Fertilizers	28 May 2009	21 March 2013	INC
1	Srikant Kumar Jena	Balasore	MoS (I/C)	Statistics and Programme Implementation	12 July 2011	26 May 2014	INC
1	Srikant Kumar Jena	Balasore	MoS (I/C)	Chemicals and Fertilizers	20 March 2013	26 May 2014	INC

== Assembly Seat wise leads ==
Constituency		Winner			Runner-up			Margin
#	Name	Candidate	Party	Votes	Candidate	Party	Votes	Margin
Bargarh Lok Sabha constituency
1	Padampur	Dr. Hamid Hussain	BJD	66,440	Sanjay Bhoi	INC	49,769	16,671
2	Bijepur	Sanjay Bhoi	INC	57,872	Dr. Hamid Hussain	BJD	50,518	7,354
3	Bargarh	Sanjay Bhoi	INC	52,982	Dr. Hamid Hussain	BJD	41,988	10,994
4	Attabira (SC)	Sanjay Bhoi	INC	63,114	Dr. Hamid Hussain	BJD	37,593	25,521
5	Bhatli	Sanjay Bhoi	INC	59,046	Dr. Hamid Hussain	BJD	57,141	1,905
6	Brajarajnagar	Sanjay Bhoi	INC	50,503	Radharani Panda	BJP	48,962	1,541
7	Jharsuguda	Sanjay Bhoi	INC	64,003	Dr. Hamid Hussain	BJD	35,847	28,156
Sundargarh Lok Sabha constituency
8	Talsara (ST)	Hemanand Biswal	INC	49,939	Jual Oram	BJP	39,434	10,505
9	Sundargarh (ST)	Hemanand Biswal	INC	62,286	Jual Oram	BJP	44,285	18,001
10	Biramitrapur (ST)	Hemanand Biswal	INC	38,306	Jual Oram	BJP	35,753	2,553
11	Raghunathpali (SC)	Jual Oram	BJP	29,616	Hemanand Biswal	INC	24,383	5,233
12	Rourkela	Jual Oram	BJP	40,716	Hemanand Biswal	INC	26,073	14,643
13	Rajgangapur (ST)	Hemanand Biswal	INC	44,645	Jual Oram	BJP	33,146	11,499
14	Bonai (ST)	Jual Oram	BJP	44,514	Hemanand Biswal	INC	33,890	10,624
Sambalpur Lok Sabha constituency
15	Kuchinda (ST)	Amarnath Pradhan	INC	55,162	Surendra Lath	BJP	36,363	18,799
16	Rengali (SC)	Amarnath Pradhan	INC	48,501	Rohit Pujari	BJD	26,252	22,249
17	Sambalpur	Surendra Lath	BJP	27,857	Amarnath Pradhan	INC	26,415	1,442
18	Rairakhol	Rohit Pujari	BJD	45,244	Amarnath Pradhan	INC	34,596	10,648
19	Deogarh	Rohit Pujari	BJD	57,036	Amarnath Pradhan	INC	43,830	13,206
62	Chhendipada (SC)	Rohit Pujari	BJD	54,208	Amarnath Pradhan	INC	50,103	4,105
63	Athamallik	Rohit Pujari	BJD	62,354	Amarnath Pradhan	INC	46,232	16,122
Keonjhar Lok Sabha constituency
20	Telkoi (ST)	Yashbant Narayan; Singh Laguri	BJD	59,201	Dhanurjaya Sidu	INC	40,549	18,652
21	Ghasipura	Yashbant Narayan; Singh Laguri	BJD	74,726	Dhanurjaya Sidu	INC	52,251	22,475
22	Anandapur (SC)	Yashbant Narayan; Singh Laguri	BJD	71,464	Dhanurjaya Sidu	INC	47,757	23,707
23	Patna (ST)	Yashbant Narayan; Singh Laguri	BJD	54,637	Dhanurjaya Sidu	INC	31,443	23,194
24	Keonjhar (ST)	Yashbant Narayan; Singh Laguri	BJD	43,393	Ananta Nayak	BJP	38,755	4,638
25	Champua	Yashbant Narayan; Singh Laguri	BJD	40,339	Dhanurjaya Sidu	INC	39,060	1,279
30	Karanjia (ST)	Yashbant Narayan; Singh Laguri	BJD	45,214	Dhanurjaya Sidu	INC	23,898	21,316
Mayurbhanj Lok Sabha constituency
26	Jashipur (ST)	Laxman Tudu	BJD	46,429	Droupadi Murmu	BJP	24,812	21,617
27	Saraskana (ST)	Laxman Tudu	BJD	30,518	Sudam Marndi	JMM	27,488	3,030
28	Rairangpur (ST)	Laxman Majhi	INC	27,388	Sudam Marndi	JMM	26,204	1,184
29	Bangriposi (ST)	Laxman Tudu	BJD	51,173	Sudam Marndi	JMM	37,028	14,145
31	Udala (ST)	Laxman Tudu	BJD	39,515	Laxman Majhi	INC	27,073	12,442
33	Baripada (ST)	Laxman Tudu	BJD	33,166	Sudam Marndi	JMM	31,190	1,976
34	Morada	Laxman Tudu	BJD	40,354	Sudam Marndi	JMM	33,180	7,174
Balasore Lok Sabha constituency
32	Badasahi (SC)	Srikant Kumar Jena	INC	38,663	M. A. Kharabela Swain	BJP	26,487	12,176
35	Jaleswar	Srikant Kumar Jena	INC	60,770	M. A. Kharabela Swain	BJP	51,111	9,659
36	Bhograi	Srikant Kumar Jena	INC	58,644	Arun Dey	NCP	56,352	2,292
37	Basta	Srikant Kumar Jena	INC	67,751	Arun Dey	NCP	56,733	11,018
38	Balasore	Arun Dey	NCP	44,223	M. A. Kharabela Swain	BJP	33,839	10,384
39	Remuna (SC)	M. A. Kharabela Swain	BJP	41,484	Arun Dey	NCP	40,984	500
40	Nilgiri	M. A. Kharabela Swain	BJP	32,823	Srikant Kumar Jena	INC	30,416	2,407
Bhadrak Lok Sabha constituency
41	Soro (SC)	Ananta Prasad Sethi	INC	51,100	Arjun Charan Sethi	BJD	33,105	17,995
42	Simulia	Arjun Charan Sethi	BJD	68,055	Ananta Prasad Sethi	INC	56,074	11,981
43	Bhandaripokhari	Arjun Charan Sethi	BJD	63,056	Ananta Prasad Sethi	INC	46,091	16,965
44	Bhadrak	Arjun Charan Sethi	BJD	72,798	Ananta Prasad Sethi	INC	57,715	15,083
45	Basudevpur	Arjun Charan Sethi	BJD	70,155	Ananta Prasad Sethi	INC	65,774	4,381
46	Dhamnagar (SC)	Arjun Charan Sethi	BJD	47,571	Ratha Das	BJP	41,680	5,891
47	Chandabali	Arjun Charan Sethi	BJD	61,866	Ananta Prasad Sethi	INC	52,617	9,249
48	Binjharpur (SC)	Mohan Jena	BJD	65,862	Amiya Kanta Mallik	INC	37,017	28,845
Jajpur Lok Sabha constituency
49	Bari	Mohan Jena	BJD	56,091	Amiya Kanta Mallik	INC	45,213	10,878
50	Barchana	Mohan Jena	BJD	55,253	Amiya Kanta Mallik	INC	38,912	16,341
51	Dharmasala	Mohan Jena	BJD	77,833	Amiya Kanta Mallik	INC	47,015	30,818
52	Jajpur	Mohan Jena	BJD	59,281	Amiya Kanta Mallik	INC	39,992	19,289
53	Korei	Mohan Jena	BJD	59,587	Amiya Kanta Mallik	INC	39,670	19,917
54	Sukinda	Mohan Jena	BJD	59,073	Amiya Kanta Mallik	INC	57,442	1,631
Dhenkanal Lok Sabha constituency
55	Dhenkanal	Tathagata Satpathy	BJD	62,278	Rudranarayan Pany	BJP	40,060	22,218
56	Hindol (SC)	Tathagata Satpathy	BJD	65,680	Chandra Sekhar Tripathi	INC	39,315	26,365
57	Kamakhyanagar	Tathagata Satpathy	BJD	64,457	Chandra Sekhar Tripathi	INC	30,693	33,764
58	Parjanga	Tathagata Satpathy	BJD	51,945	Rudranarayan Pany	BJP	43,634	8,311
59	Pallahara	Tathagata Satpathy	BJD	43,667	Rudranarayan Pany	BJP	36,009	7,658
60	Talcher	Tathagata Satpathy	BJD	47,105	Rudranarayan Pany	BJP	29,946	17,159
61	Angul	Tathagata Satpathy	BJD	63,402	Chandra Sekhar Tripathi	INC	40,021	23,381
Bolangir Lok Sabha constituency
64	Birmaharajpur (SC)	Kalikesh Narayan; Singh Deo	BJD	63,867	Narasingha Mishra	INC	41,103	22,764
65	Sonepur	Kalikesh Narayan; Singh Deo	BJD	76,002	Narasingha Mishra	INC	46,506	29,496
66	Loisingha (SC)	Kalikesh Narayan; Singh Deo	BJD	60,290	Narasingha Mishra	INC	55,558	4,732
67	Patnagarh	Sangeeta Kumari; Singh Deo	BJP	61,313	Kalikesh Narayan; Singh Deo	BJD	47,179	14,134
68	Bolangir	Kalikesh Narayan; Singh Deo	BJD	54,071	Narasingha Mishra	INC	45,022	9,049
69	Titlagarh	Kalikesh Narayan; Singh Deo	BJD	66,263	Narasingha Mishra	INC	50,141	16,122
70	Kantabanji	Kalikesh Narayan; Singh Deo	BJD	62,425	Narasingha Mishra	INC	60,399	2,026
Kalahandi Lok Sabha constituency
71	Nuapada	Subash Chandra Nayak	BJD	48,926	Bikram Keshari Deo	BJP	32,530	16,396
72	Khariar	Bikram Keshari Deo	BJP	47,518	Bhakta Charan Das	INC	46,386	1,132
77	Lanjigarh (ST)	Bhakta Charan Das	INC	56,234	Subash Chandra Nayak	BJD	37,945	18,289
78	Junagarh	Bhakta Charan Das	INC	72,741	Bikram Keshari Deo	BJP	29,033	43,708
79	Dharmgarh	Bhakta Charan Das	INC	61,145	Subash Chandra Nayak	BJD	44,682	16,463
80	Bhawanipatna (SC)	Bhakta Charan Das	INC	62,500	Bikram Keshari Deo	BJP	31,741	30,759
81	Narla	Bhakta Charan Das	INC	69,434	Subash Chandra Nayak	BJD	29,327	40,107
Nabarangpur Lok Sabha constituency
73	Umarkote (ST)	Domburu Majhi	BJD	42,147	Pradeep Kumar Majhi	INC	31,108	11,039
74	Jharigam (ST)	Domburu Majhi	BJD	51,833	Pradeep Kumar Majhi	INC	44,808	7,025
75	Nabarangpur (ST)	Pradeep Kumar Majhi	INC	59,124	Domburu Majhi	BJD	48,830	10,294
76	Dabugam (ST)	Pradeep Kumar Majhi	INC	53,868	Domburu Majhi	BJD	34,755	19,113
142	Kotpad (ST)	Pradeep Kumar Majhi	INC	55,524	Domburu Majhi	BJD	36,280	19,244
146	Malkangiri (ST)	Domburu Majhi	BJD	37,418	Pradeep Kumar Majhi	INC	32,742	4,676
147	Chitrakonda (ST)	Pradeep Kumar Majhi	INC	31,091	Domburu Majhi	BJD	27,040	4,051
Kandhamal Lok Sabha constituency
82	Baliguda (ST)	Ashok Sahu	BJP	28,071	Suzit Kumar Padhi	INC	18,645	9,426
83	G. Udayagiri (ST)	Ashok Sahu	BJP	47,963	Suzit Kumar Padhi	INC	22,346	25,617
84	Phulbani (ST)	Rudramadhab Ray	BJD	37,059	Ashok Sahu	BJP	30,988	6,071
85	Kantamal	Rudramadhab Ray	BJD	47,857	Suzit Kumar Padhi	INC	31,584	16,273
86	Boudh	Rudramadhab Ray	BJD	48,977	Suzit Kumar Padhi	INC	28,387	20,590
121	Daspalla (SC)	Rudramadhab Ray	BJD	64,811	Suzit Kumar Padhi	INC	21,878	42,933
123	Bhanjanagar	Rudramadhab Ray	BJD	90,816	Suzit Kumar Padhi	INC	17,247	73,569
Cuttack Lok Sabha constituency
87	Baramba	Bhartruhari Mahtab	BJD	81,602	Bibhuti Bhusan Mishra	INC	40,662	40,940
88	Banki	Bhartruhari Mahtab	BJD	71,611	Bibhuti Bhusan Mishra	INC	46,740	24,871
89	Athagarh	Bhartruhari Mahtab	BJD	61,632	Bibhuti Bhusan Mishra	INC	34,419	27,213
90	Barabati-Cuttack	Bhartruhari Mahtab	BJD	49,253	Bibhuti Bhusan Mishra	INC	25,764	23,489
91	Choudwar-Cuttack	Bhartruhari Mahtab	BJD	63,650	Anadi Sahu	BJP	20,209	43,441
93	Cuttack Sadar (SC)	Bhartruhari Mahtab	BJD	74,486	Bibhuti Bhusan Mishra	INC	22,276	52,210
120	Khandapada	Bhartruhari Mahtab	BJD	62,768	Bibhuti Bhusan Mishra	INC	43,115	19,653
Kendrapara Lok Sabha constituency
94	Salipur	Baijayant Panda	BJD	68,456	Ranjib Biswal	INC	62,070	6,386
95	Mahanga	Baijayant Panda	BJD	88,321	Ranjib Biswal	INC	60,340	27,981
96	Patkura	Baijayant Panda	BJD	74,937	Jnandev Beura	BJP	35,105	39,832
97	Kendrapara (SC)	Baijayant Panda	BJD	64,029	Ranjib Biswal	INC	44,962	19,067
98	Aul	Baijayant Panda	BJD	71,930	Ranjib Biswal	INC	65,577	6,353
99	Rajanagar	Baijayant Panda	BJD	64,251	Ranjib Biswal	INC	58,167	6,084
100	Mahakalapada	Baijayant Panda	BJD	70,704	Ranjib Biswal	INC	51,513	19,191
Jagatsinghpur Lok Sabha constituency
92	Niali (SC)	Bibhu Prasad Tarai	CPI	70,036	Rabindra Kumar Sethy	INC	47,991	22,045
101	Paradeep	Bibhu Prasad Tarai	CPI	70,994	Rabindra Kumar Sethy	INC	33,125	37,869
102	Tirtol (SC)	Rabindra Kumar Sethy	INC	57,080	Bibhu Prasad Tarai	CPI	63,529	6,449
103	Balikuda-Ersama	Bibhu Prasad Tarai	CPI	73,884	Rabindra Kumar Sethy	INC	63,633	10,251
104	Jagatsinghpur	Rabindra Kumar Sethy	INC	63,121	Bibhu Prasad Tarai	CPI	53,741	9,380
105	Kakatpur (SC)	Rabindra Kumar Sethy	INC	65,055	Bibhu Prasad Tarai	CPI	61,412	3,643
106	Nimapara	Bibhu Prasad Tarai	CPI	63,613	Rabindra Kumar Sethy	INC	50,467	13,146

== Assembly segments wise lead of parties ==
Party	Assembly segments	Position in Assembly (as of 2009 simultaneous elections)
Biju Janata Dal	97	103
Indian National Congress	33	27
Bharatiya Janata Party	11	6
Communist Party of India	5	–
Nationalist Congress Party	1	4
Others	–	7
Total	147	
