= Elections in Odisha =

Elections in Odisha are conducted in accordance with the Constitution of India. The Odisha Legislative Assembly creates laws regarding the conduct of local body elections unilaterally while any changes by the state legislature to the conduct of state level elections need to be approved by the Parliament of India. In addition, the state legislature may be dismissed by the Parliament according to Article 356 of the Indian Constitution and President's rule may be imposed.

== Political parties ==
Elections in Odisha have historically been characterized by a transition from a multi-party coalition era (1950s–1970s) to a bipolar and, subsequently, a tripolar political landscape. Currently, the state's electoral politics is overwhelmingly dominated by the Bharatiya Janata Party (BJP) and the Biju Janata Dal (BJD), with the Indian National Congress (INC) serving as a distant third force.

=== Active political parties ===
The following recognized national and state parties have an active electoral presence and representation in Odisha's political landscape. The seat counts and visual composition bars reflect the historic mandates of the 2024 Odisha Legislative Assembly election and the 2024 Indian general election in Odisha.

Major active political parties in Odisha
Party	Abbr.	State Head	Political position	Ideology	Current Electoral Representation		
Party	Abbr.	State Head	Political position	Ideology	Legislative Assembly	Lok Sabha	Rajya Sabha
Bharatiya Janata Party	BJP	Manmohan Samal	Right-wing	Hindutva; Conservatism; Integral humanism	79 / 147	20 / 21	5 / 10
Biju Janata Dal	BJD	Naveen Patnaik	Centre-left	Social democracy Secularism; Odia regionalism	50 / 147	0 / 21	5 / 10
Indian National Congress	INC	Bhakta Charan Das	Centre to centre-left	Social liberalism Civic nationalism Secularism	14 / 147	1 / 21	0 / 10
Communist Party of India (Marxist)	CPI(M)	Ali Kishore Patnaik	Left-wing	Communism; Marxism–Leninism	1 / 147	0 / 21	0 / 10
Communist Party of India	CPI	Abhaya Sahoo	Left-wing	Communism; Marxism–Leninism	0 / 147	0 / 21	0 / 10
Jharkhand Mukti Morcha	JMM	Anjani Soren	Regionalist	Tribal rights	0 / 147	0 / 21	0 / 10

Note: The 3 remaining seats in the 147-member Odisha Legislative Assembly are held by Independents.

=== Historical and defunct political parties ===
Odisha's political history is heavily shaped by the influence of early regional parties and national socialist factions. Several of these outfits successfully formed state governments or served as the principal opposition before eventually splintering, merging, or dissolving entirely.

Notable defunct political parties in Odisha
Party	Abbr.	Key leaders in Odisha	Historical significance
All India Ganatantra Parishad	AIGP	Rajendra Narayan Singh Deo	A powerful regional party founded in 1950, primarily supported by the erstwhile rulers of princely states in Western Odisha. It served as the principal opposition in the 1950s and successfully formed a coalition government with the Congress in 1959. It later merged into the Swatantra Party.
Socialist Party	SP	Surendranath Dwivedy	Founded in 1948 shortly after independence, the SP briefly acted as a prominent leftist voice advocating for peasant and labor rights before merging with the Kisan Mazdoor Praja Party to form the PSP in 1952.
Praja Socialist Party	PSP	Surendranath Dwivedy, Bankabehari Das	Active between 1952 and 1972, the PSP was a major socialist force in Odisha, consistently serving as a strong opposition bloc in the legislative assembly and actively championing anti-feudal land reform movements.
Swatantra Party	SWP	Rajendra Narayan Singh Deo	A classical liberal and conservative national party that found immense electoral success in Odisha following the merger of the AIGP. R. N. Singh Deo led a Swatantra–Jana Congress coalition government, serving as Chief Minister from 1967 to 1971.
Utkal Congress	UC	Biju Patnaik	Founded in 1969 by Biju Patnaik after his departure from the Indian National Congress. Focused strictly on Odia regional development, it formed a brief coalition government (the United Front) in 1971 before merging into the Bharatiya Lok Dal and eventually the Janata Party.
Janata Party	JP	Nilamani Routray, Biju Patnaik	Formed as an umbrella opposition to the Congress post-Emergency, the Janata Party secured a massive mandate in the 1977 Odisha elections, resulting in Nilamani Routray serving as Chief Minister from 1977 to 1980.
Janata Dal	JD	Biju Patnaik	The dominant centrist alternative to the Congress in the late 1980s and 1990s. Biju Patnaik led the Janata Dal to a sweeping victory in the 1990 elections, serving as Chief Minister until 1995. Following his death in 1997, the state unit officially split to form the modern Biju Janata Dal (BJD).

== Lok Sabha elections ==
Odisha's representation in the Lok Sabha (the lower house of the Parliament of India) consisted of 20 seats from the 1st to the 5th Lok Sabha. Following the delimitation exercise prior to the 1977 general elections, the state's quota was increased to 21 seats.

Results of Lok Sabha elections in Odisha
Lok Sabha	Election Year	Top Three Performing Parties			Others	Total Seats
Lok Sabha	Election Year	First Party	Second Party	Third Party	Others	Total Seats
1st	1951	INC (11)	AIGP (6)	SP (1)	CPI (1); IND (1)	20
2nd	1957	INC (7)	AIGP (7)	PSP (2)	CPI (1); IND (3)	20
3rd	1962	INC (14)	AIGP (4)	PSP (1)	SP (1)	20
4th	1967	SWP (8)	INC (6)	PSP (4)	SSP (1); IND (1)	20
5th	1971	INC (15)	SWP (3)	CPI (1)	UC (1)	20
6th	1977	JP (15)	INC (5)	CPI(M) (1)	—	21
7th	1980	INC (20)	JP(S) (1)	—	—	21
8th	1984	INC (20)	JP (1)	—	—	21
9th	1989	JD (16)	INC (3)	CPI(M) (1)	CPI (1)	21
10th	1991	INC (13)	JD (6)	CPI(M) (1)	CPI (1)	21
11th	1996	INC (16)	JD (4)	SAP (1)	—	21
12th	1998	BJD (9)	BJP (7)	INC (5)	—	21
13th	1999	BJD (10)	BJP (9)	INC (2)	—	21
14th	2004	BJD (11)	BJP (7)	INC (2)	JMM (1)	21
15th	2009	BJD (14)	INC (6)	CPI (1)	—	21
16th	2014	BJD (20)	BJP (1)	—	—	21
17th	2019	BJD (12)	BJP (8)	INC (1)	—	21
18th	2024	BJP (20)	INC (1)	—	—	21

== Legislative Assembly elections ==
Summary of Odisha Legislative Assembly Elections
Assembly	Year	First Party	Second Party	Third Party	Others	Total Seats	Chief Minister(s)
1st	1952	INC (67)	AIGP (31)	SP (10)	CPI (7), AIFB (1), IND (24)	140	Nabakrushna Choudhuri, Harekrushna Mahatab (INC)
2nd	1957	INC (56)	AIGP (51)	PSP (11)	CPI (9), IND (13)	140	Harekrushna Mahatab (INC)
3rd	1961	INC (82)	AIGP (37)	PSP (10)	CPI (4), IND (17)	140	Biju Patnaik, Biren Mitra, Sadashiva Tripathy (INC)
4th	1967	SWP (49)	INC (31)	OJC (26)	PSP (21), CPI (7), SSP (2), CPI(M) (1), IND (3)	140	Rajendra Narayan Singh Deo (SWP)
5th	1971	INC(R) (51)	SWP (36)	UC (33)	PSP (4), CPI (4), JAP (4), CPI(M) (2), INC(O) (1), OJC (1), IND (3)	140	Bishwanath Das (IND); Nandini Satpathy (INC(R))
6th	1974	INC(R) (69)	UC (35)	SWP (21)	CPI (8), CPI(M) (3), PSP (2), OJC (1), JAP (1), IND (7)	147	Nandini Satpathy, Binayak Acharya (INC(R))
7th	1977	JP (110)	INC(R) (26)	CPI (1)	CPI(M) (1), IND (9)	147	Nilamani Routray (JP)
8th	1980	INC(I) (118)	JP(S) (13)	CPI (4)	JP (3), INC(U) (2), IND (7)	147	Janaki Ballabh Patnaik (INC)
9th	1985	INC (117)	JP (21)	CPI (1)	BJP (1), IND (7)	147	Janaki Ballabh Patnaik, Hemananda Biswal (INC)
10th	1990	JD (123)	INC (10)	CPI (5)	BJP (2), CPI(M) (1), IND (7)	147	Biju Patnaik (JD)
11th	1995	INC (80)	JD (46)	BJP (9)	JMM (4), CPI (1), JPP (1), IND (6)	147	Janaki Ballabh Patnaik, Giridhar Gamang, Hemananda Biswal (INC)
12th	2000	BJD (68)	BJP (38)	INC (26)	JMM (3), CPI (1), CPI(M) (1), JD(S) (1), AITC (1), IND (8)	147	Naveen Patnaik (BJD)
13th	2004	BJD (61)	INC (38)	BJP (32)	JMM (4), OGP (2), CPI (1), CPI(M) (1), IND (8)	147	Naveen Patnaik (BJD)
14th	2009	BJD (103)	INC (27)	BJP (6)	NCP (4), CPI (1), IND (6)	147	Naveen Patnaik (BJD)
15th	2014	BJD (117)	INC (16)	BJP (10)	CPI(M) (1), SKD (1), IND (2)	147	Naveen Patnaik (BJD)
16th	2019	BJD (113)	BJP (23)	INC (9)	CPI(M) (1), IND (1)	147	Naveen Patnaik (BJD)
17th	2024	BJP (78)	BJD (51)	INC (14)	CPI(M) (1), IND (3)	147	Mohan Charan Majhi (BJP)

=== 1952 ===
Party	Seats		Vote (%)
Party	Contested	Won	Vote (%)
Indian National Congress	135	67	37.87%
Ganatantra Parishad	58	31	20.50%
Socialist Party	79	10	11.77%
Communist Party of India	33	7	5.62%
All India Forward Bloc	2	1	0.35%
Independent	204	24	22.94%
Total		140	100.00%

=== 1957 ===
Party	Seats			Popular Vote	
Party	Contested	Won	+/−	%	± pp
Indian National Congress	140	56	▼11	38.26%	▲0.39
Ganatantra Parishad	108	51	▲20	28.74%	▲8.24
Praja Socialist Party	46	11	new	10.40%	new
Communist Party of India	43	9	▲2	8.40%	▲2.78
Independent	171	13	▼11	14.21%	▼8.73
Total		140		100.00%	

=== 1961 ===
Party	Seats			Popular Vote	
Party	Contested	Won	+/−	%	± pp
Indian National Congress	140	82	▲26	43.28%	▲5.02
Ganatantra Parishad	121	37	▼14	22.34%	▼6.40
Praja Socialist Party	43	10	▼1	10.99%	▲0.59
Communist Party of India	35	4	▼5	7.98%	▼0.42
Independent	187	7	▼6	14.54%	▲0.33
Total		140		100.00%	

=== 1967 ===
Party	Seats			Popular Vote	
Party	Contested	Won	+/−	%	± pp
Swatantra Party	101	49	new	22.58%	new
Orissa Jana Congress	47	26	new	13.47%	new
Praja Socialist Party	33	21	▲11	12.26%	▲1.27
Indian National Congress	141	31	▼51	30.66%	▼12.62
Communist Party of India	31	7	▲3	5.26%	▼2.72
Samyukta Socialist Party	9	2	new	1.52%	new
CPI(M)	10	1	new	1.16%	new
Independent	212	3	▼4	12.55%	▼1.99
Total		140		100.00%	

=== 1971 ===
Party	Seats			Popular Vote	
Party	Contested	Won	+/−	%	± pp
Indian National Congress (R)	129	51	new	28.18%	new
Swatantra Party	115	36	▼13	17.44%	▼5.14
Utkal Congress	139	33	new	23.99%	new
Praja Socialist Party	50	4	▼17	6.08%	▼6.18
Communist Party of India	29	4	▼3	4.79%	▼0.47
All India Jharkhand Party	14	4	new	1.64%	new
CPI(M)	11	2	▲1	1.20%	▲0.04
Orissa Jana Congress	66	1	▼26	5.16%	▼8.31
Indian National Congress (O)	50	1	new	1.81%	new
Independent	190	4	▲1	7.55%	▼5.00
Total		140		100.00%	

=== 1974 ===
Party	Seats			Popular Vote	
Party	Contested	Won	+/−	%	± pp
Indian National Congress (R)	135	69	▲18	37.44%	▲9.26
Utkal Congress	95	35	▲2	26.45%	▲2.46
Swatantra Party	56	21	▼15	12.08%	▼5.36
Communist Party of India	14	7	▲3	4.87%	▲0.08
Socialist Party	17	2	new	1.77%	new
CPI(M)	8	3	▲1	1.18%	▼0.02
Orissa Jana Congress	42	1	Steady	1.17%	▼3.99
Jharkhand Party	12	1	new	0.60%	new
Independent	299	7	▲3	13.06%	▲5.51
Total		146		100.00%	

=== 1977 ===
Party	Seats			Popular Vote	
Party	Contested	Won	+/−	%	± pp
Janata Party	147	110	new	49.17%	new
Indian National Congress (R)	146	26	▼43	31.02%	▼6.42
Communist Party of India	25	1	▼6	3.57%	▼1.30
CPI(M)	4	1	▼2	0.88%	▼0.30
Independent	264	9	▲2	14.37%	▲1.31
Total		147		100.00%	

=== 1980 ===
Party	Seats			Popular Vote	
Party	Contested	Won	+/−	%	± pp
INC(I)	147	118	▲92	47.78%	▲16.76
Janata Party (Secular)	110	13	new	19.49%	new
Communist Party of India	27	4	▲3	5.09%	▲1.52
Janata Party	31	3	▼107	4.14%	▼45.03
Indian National Congress (U)	98	2	new	7.03%	new
Independent	248	7	▼2	11.88%	▼2.49
Total		147		100.00%	

=== 1985 ===
Party	Seats			Popular Vote	
Party	Contested	Won	+/−	%	± pp
Indian National Congress	147	117	▼1	51.08%	▲3.30
Janata Party	140	21	▲18	30.61%	▲26.47
Communist Party of India	27	1	▼3	3.31%	▼1.78
Bharatiya Janata Party	67	1	▲1	2.60%	▲1.24
Independent	374	7	Steady	10.50%	▼1.38
Total		147		100.00%	

=== 1990 ===
Party	Seats			Popular Vote	
Party	Contested	Won	+/−	%	± pp
Janata Dal	139	123	new	53.69%	new
Indian National Congress	145	10	▼107	29.78%	▼21.30
Communist Party of India	9	5	▲4	2.98%	▼0.33
Bharatiya Janata Party	63	2	▲1	3.56%	▲0.96
CPI(M)	3	1	▲1	0.84%	new
Independent	389	6	▼1	7.36%	▼3.14
Total		147		100.00%	

=== 1995 ===
Party	Seats			Popular Vote	
Party	Contested	Won	+/−	%	± pp
Indian National Congress	146	80	▲70	39.08%	▲9.30
Janata Dal	146	46	▼77	35.73%	▼17.96
Bharatiya Janata Party	144	9	▲7	7.88%	▲4.32
Jharkhand Mukti Morcha	16	4	new	1.94%	new
Communist Party of India	21	1	▼4	1.71%	▼1.27
Jharkhand People's Party	4	1	new	0.17%	new
Independent	682	6	Steady	10.51%	▲3.15
Total		147		100.00%	

=== 2000 ===
Party	Seats			Popular Vote	
Party	Contested	Won	+/−	%	± pp
Biju Janata Dal	84	68	new	29.40%	new
Bharatiya Janata Party	63	38	▲29	18.20%	▲10.32
Indian National Congress	145	26	▼54	33.78%	▼5.30
Jharkhand Mukti Morcha	21	3	▼1	2.14%	▲0.20
Communist Party of India	29	1	Steady	1.22%	▼0.49
Janata Dal (Secular)	24	1	new	0.84%	new
All India Trinamool Congress	36	1	new	0.78%	new
CPI(M)	15	1	▲1	0.77%	new
Independent	236	8	▲2	10.66%	▲0.51
Total		147		100.00%	

=== 2004 ===
Party	Seats			Popular Vote	
Party	Contested	Won	+/−	%	± pp
Biju Janata Dal	84	61	▼7	27.36%	▼2.04
Indian National Congress	134	38	▲12	34.82%	▲1.04
Bharatiya Janata Party	63	32	▼6	17.11%	▼1.09
Jharkhand Mukti Morcha	12	4	▲1	1.78%	▼0.36
Odisha Gana Parishad	4	2	new	1.29%	new
Communist Party of India	6	1	Steady	0.77%	▼0.45
CPI(M)	3	1	Steady	0.55%	▼0.22
Independent	295	8	Steady	12.20%	▲1.54
Total		147		100.00%	

=== 2009 ===
Party	Seats			Popular Vote	
Party	Contested	Won	+/−	%	± pp
Biju Janata Dal	129	103	▲42	38.86%	▲11.50
Indian National Congress	147	27	▼11	29.10%	▼5.72
Bharatiya Janata Party	145	6	▼26	15.03%	▼2.06
Nationalist Congress Party	8	4	new	1.34%	new
Communist Party of India	5	1	Steady	0.51%	▼0.26
Independent	372	6	▼2	8.66%	▼3.54
Total		147		100.00%	

=== 2014 ===
Party	Seats			Popular Vote	
Party	Contested	Won	+/−	%	± pp
Biju Janata Dal	147	117	▲14	43.40%	▲4.54
Indian National Congress	147	16	▼11	25.70%	▼3.40
Bharatiya Janata Party	147	10	▲4	18.00%	▲2.97
CPI(M)	12	1	▲1	0.37%	▼0.07
Samata Kranti Dal	51	1	new	0.40%	new
Independent	276	2	▼4	5.04%	▼3.62
NOTA	–	–	–	1.30%	new
Total		147		100.00%	

=== 2019 ===
Party	Seats			Popular Vote	
Party	Contested	Won	+/−	%	± pp
Biju Janata Dal	146	113	▼4	44.70%	▲1.30
Bharatiya Janata Party	146	23	▲13	32.50%	▲14.50
Indian National Congress	138	9	▼7	16.12%	▼9.60
CPI(M)	5	1	Steady	0.30%	▼0.07
Independent	302	1	▼1	2.82%	▼2.22
NOTA	–	–	–	1.05%	▼0.25
Total		147		100.00%	

=== 2024 ===
Party	Seats			Popular Vote	
Party	Contested	Won	+/−	%	± pp
Bharatiya Janata Party	147	78	▲55	40.07%	▲7.50
Biju Janata Dal	147	51	▼62	40.22%	▼4.50
Indian National Congress	145	14	▲5	13.26%	▼2.80
CPI(M)	7	1	Steady	0.37%	▲0.07
Independent	425	3	▲2	–	–
NOTA	–	–	–	1.02%	▼0.03
Total		147		100.00%	
