= 2019 Indian general election in Odisha =

Indian lower house election in Odisha

- 11-29 April 2019

21 seats
- Turnout: 73.29% (▼0.60%)
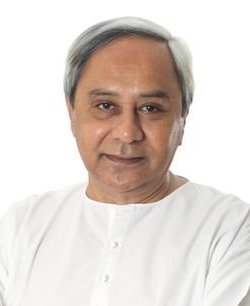

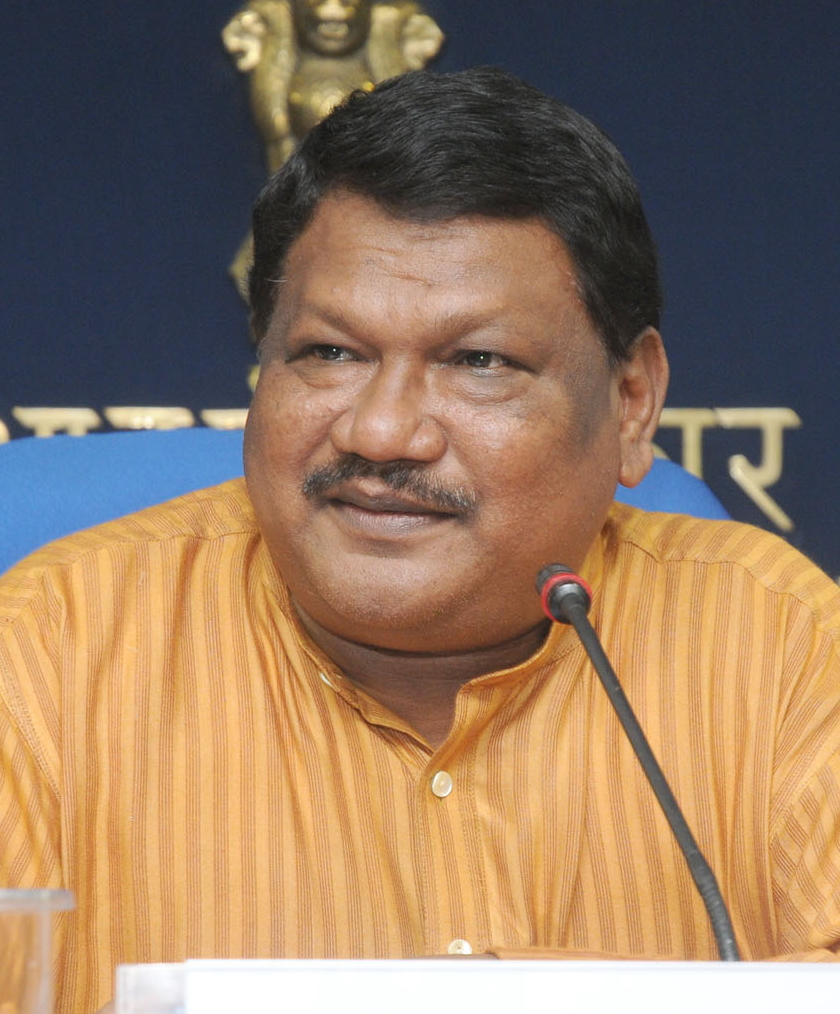

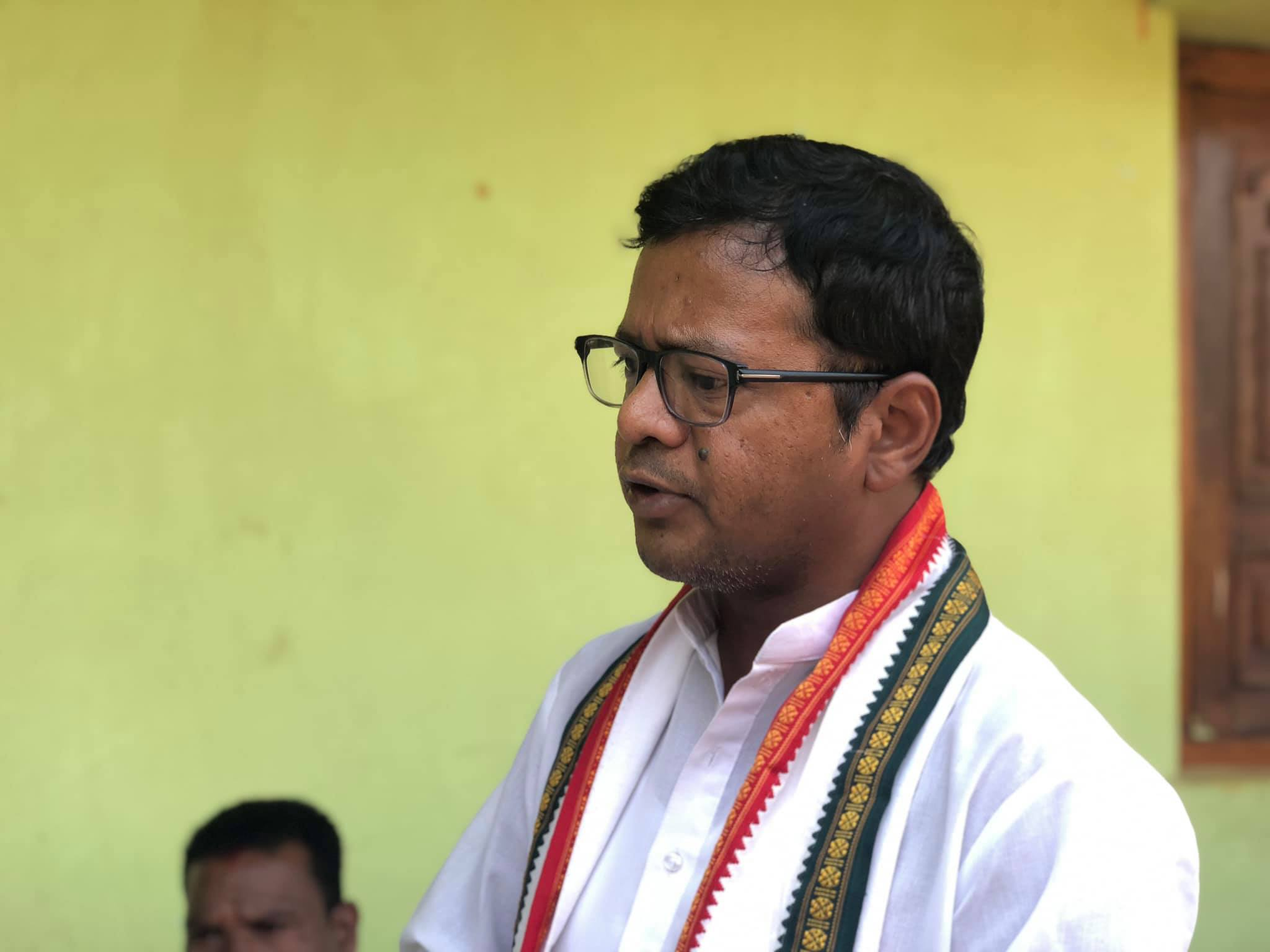
	First party	Second party	Third party
Leader	Naveen Patnaik	Jual Oram	Saptagiri Sankar Ulaka
Party	BJD	BJP	INC
Alliance		NDA	UPA
Leader since	1996	2014	2019
Leader's seat	did not contest	Sundargarh (won)	Koraput (won)
Seats before	20	1	0
Seats won	12	8	1
Seat change	▼8	▲7	▲1
Percentage	42.8%	38.4%	13.4%
Swing	▼1.3%	▲16.9%	▼12.2%
- Seatwise Result Map of the 2019 general election in Odisha
Prime Minister before election
Narendra Modi
BJP
Elected Prime Minister
Narendra Modi
BJP

The 2019 Indian general election for the 21 Parliamentary Constituencies were held in four phases to constitute the 17th Lok Sabha. The Legislative Assembly elections were held simultaneously with the General Elections in the state. Major political parties in the state were Biju Janata Dal, Indian National Congress and Bharatiya Janata Party.

== Election schedule ==
The constituency-wise election schedule is as follows.

Phase	Poll date	Constituencies	Voter turnout (%)
1	11 April 2019	Kalahandi, Nabarangpur, Berhampur, Koraput	74.28% ▼
2	18 April 2019	Bargarh, Sundargarh, Bolangir, Kandhamal, Aska	72.90% ▲
3	23 April 2019	Sambalpur, Keonjhar, Dhenkanal, Cuttack, Puri, Bhubaneswar	71.61% ▼
4	29 April 2019	Mayurbhanj, Balasore, Bhadrak, Jajpur, Kendrapara, Jagatsinghpur	74.61% ▼

== Parties and alliances ==
=== Biju Janata Dal ===
Party	Flag	Symbol	Leader	Seats contested
Biju Janata Dal			Naveen Patnaik	21

=== National Democratic Alliance ===
Party	Flag	Symbol	Leader	Seats contested
Bharatiya Janata Party			Jual Oram	21

=== United Progressive Alliance ===
Party	Flag	Symbol	Leader	Seats contested
Indian National Congress			Saptagiri Sankar Ulaka	18
Jharkhand Mukti Morcha	JMM flag		Anjani Soren	1
Communist Party of India (Marxist)			Janardan Pati	1
Communist Party of India			Rama Krushna Panda	1
Total				21

== Candidates ==
Constituency		BJD		BJP		UPA	
#	Name	Party	Candidate	Party	Candidate	Party	Candidate
1	Bargarh	BJD	Prasanna Acharya	BJP	Suresh Pujari	INC	Pradeep Kumar Devta
2	Sundargarh (ST)	BJD	Sunita Biswal	BJP	Jual Oram	INC	George Tirkey
3	Sambalpur	BJD	Nalin Pradhan	BJP	Nitesh Ganga Deb	INC	Sarat Patnaik
4	Keonjhar (ST)	BJD	Chandrani Murmu	BJP	Ananta Nayak	INC	Fakir Mohan Naik
5	Mayurbhanj (ST)	BJD	Debashish Marandi	BJP	Bishweswar Tudu	JMM	Anjali Soren
6	Balasore	BJD	Rabindra Kumar Jena	BJP	Pratap Sarangi	INC	Navajyoti Patnaik
7	Bhadrak (SC)	BJD	Manjulala Mandal	BJP	Avimanyu Sethi	INC	Madhumita Sethi
8	Jajpur (SC)	BJD	Sarmishta Sethi	BJP	Amiya Kanta Mallick	INC	Manas Jena
9	Dhenkanal	BJD	Mahesh Sahoo	BJP	Rudra Narayan Pani	INC	Kamakhya Prasad Deo
10	Bolangir	BJD	Kalikesh Narayan Deo	BJP	Sangeeta Kumari Deo	INC	Samarendra Mishta
11	Kalahandi	BJD	Pushpendra Singh Deoli	BJP	Basanta Kumar Panda	INC	Bhakta Charan Das
12	Nabarangpur (ST)	BJD	Ramesh Chandra Majhi	BJP	Balabhadra Majhi	INC	Pradeep Majhi
13	Kandhamal	BJD	Dr. Achyuta Samanta	BJP	M. A. Kharavela Swain	INC	Manoj Kumar Acharya
14	Cuttack	BJD	Bhartruhari Mahtab	BJP	Prakash Mishra	INC	Panchanan Kanungo
15	Kendrapara	BJD	Anubhav Mohanty	BJP	Baijayant Panda	INC	Dharanidhar Nayak
16	Jagatsinghpur (SC)	BJD	Rajashree Mallick	BJP	Bibhu Prasad Tarai	INC	Pratima Mallick
17	Puri	BJD	Pinaki Mishra	BJP	Sambit Patra	INC	Satya Prakash Nayak
18	Bhubaneswar	BJD	Arup Mohan Patnaik	BJP	Aparajita Sarangi	CPM	Janardan Pati
19	Aska	BJD	Pramila Bisoyi	BJP	Anita Subhadarshini	CPI	Rama Krushna Panda
20	Berhampur	BJD	Chandra Sekhar Sahu	BJP	Bhrugu Baxipatra	INC	V. Chandrasekhar Naidu
21	Koraput (ST)	BJD	Kaushalya Hikaka	BJP	Jayaram Pangi	INC	Saptagiri Ulka

== Opinion Polls ==
Date published	Polling agency				Lead
Date published	Polling agency	NDA	UPA	BJD	Lead
6 April 2019	India TV - CNX	6	1	14	8
Jan 2019	ABP News - Cvoter	12	–	9	3
Nov 2018	ABP News- C Voter	13	3	5	6
Oct 2018	ABP News- CSDS	13	2	6	7

== Result by Party/Alliance ==
Alliance/ Party		Popular vote			Seats		
Alliance/ Party		Votes	%	±pp	Contested	Won	+/−
BJD		1,01,74,021	43.32	▼0.76	21	12	▼8
BJP		91,30,768	38.88	▲17.33	21	8	▲7
UPA	INC	32,85,339	13.99	▼11.98	18	1	▲1
UPA	JMM	1,35,552	0.58	▼0.22	1	0	Steady
UPA	CPI	59,978	0.26	▼0.04	1	0	Steady
UPA	CPI(M)	23,026	0.09	▼0.15	1	0	Steady
UPA	Total	35,03,895	14.92	Steady	21	1	Steady
Others		5,14,278	2.20	Steady	75	0	Steady
IND		1,60,336	0.68	▼0.87	31	0	Steady
NOTA		3,10,824	1.32	Steady			
Total		2,34,83,298	100%	-	169	21	-

== Results ==
The results of the election were declared on 23 May 2019. The elected public representatives are mentioned below:

Constituency		Winner				Runner Up				Margin	%
#	Name	Candidate	Party	Votes	%	Candidate	Party	Votes	%	Margin	%
1	Bargarh	Suresh Pujari	BJP	581,245	46.46	Prasanna Acharya	BJD	517,306	41.35	63,939	5.11
2	Sundargarh	Jual Oram	BJP	500,056	45.42	Sunita Biswal	BJD	276,991	25.16	223,065	20.26
3	Sambalpur	Nitesh Ganga Deb	BJP	473,770	42.05	Nalin Pradhan	BJD	464,608	41.24	9,162	0.81
4	Keonjhar	Chandrani Murmu	BJD	526,359	44.74	Ananta Nayak	BJP	460,156	39.11	66,203	5.63
5	Mayurbhanj	Bishweswar Tudu	BJP	483,812	42.01	Dr Debashis Marndi	BJD	458,556	39.82	25,256	2.19
6	Balasore	Pratap Sarangi	BJP	483,858	41.74	Rabindra Kumar Jena	BJD	470,902	40.62	12,956	1.12
7	Bhadrak	Manjulala Mandal	BJD	513,045	41.78	Avimanyu Sethi	BJP	484,254	39.43	28,791	2.35
8	Jajpur	Sarmishta Sethi	BJD	544,020	49.77	Amiya Kanta Mallick	BJP	442,327	40.47	101,693	9.30
9	Dhenkanal	Mahesh Sahoo	BJD	522,884	46.14	Rudra Narayan Pany	BJP	487,472	43.02	35,412	3.12
10	Bolangir	Sangeeta Kumari Singh Deo	BJP	498,086	38.12	Kalikesh Narayan Singh Deo	BJD	478,570	36.62	19,516	1.50
11	Kalahandi	Basanta Kumar Panda	BJP	433,074	35.18	Puspendra Singh Deo	BJD	406,260	33.00	26,814	2.18
12	Nabarangpur	Ramesh Chandra Majhi	BJD	392,504	33.78	Pradeep Kumar Majhi	INC	350,870	30.20	41,634	3.58
13	Kandhamal	Achyutananda Samanta	BJD	461,679	49.01	M. A. Kharabela Swain	BJP	312,463	33.17	149,216	15.84
14	Cuttack	Bhartruhari Mahtab	BJD	524,592	49.47	Prakash Mishra	BJP	403,391	38.04	121,201	11.43
15	Kendrapara	Anubhav Mohanty	BJD	630,179	50.88	Baijayant Panda	BJP	476,598	38.48	153,581	12.40
16	Jagatsinghpur	Rajashree Mallick	BJD	619,985	50.41	Bibhu Prasad Tarai	BJP	348,330	28.32	271,655	22.09
17	Puri	Pinaki Misra	BJD	538,321	47.38	Dr Sambit Patra	BJP	526,607	46.35	11,714	1.03
18	Bhubaneswar	Aparajita Sarangi	BJP	486,991	48.43	Arup Mohan Patnaik	BJD	463,152	46.06	23,839	2.37
19	Aska	Pramila Bisoyi	BJD	552,749	54.52	Anita Subhadarshini	BJP	348,042	34.33	204,707	20.19
20	Berhampur	Chandra Sekhar Sahu	BJD	443,843	44.83	Bhrugu Baxipatra	BJP	348,999	35.25	94,844	9.58
21	Koraput	Saptagiri Sankar Ulaka	INC	371,129	34.34	Kausalya Hikaka	BJD	367,516	34.01	3,613	0.33

== Post-election Union Council of Ministers from Odisha ==
SI No.	Name	Constituency	Designation	Department	From	To	Party
1	Pratap Chandra Sarangi	Balasore	Minister of State	Micro, Small and Medium Enterprises	31 May 2019	7 July 2021	BJP
1	Pratap Chandra Sarangi	Balasore	Minister of State	Fisheries, Animal Husbandry and Dairying	31 May 2019	7 July 2021	BJP
2	Ashwini Vaishnaw	Rajya Sabha (Odisha)	Cabinet Minister	Railways	7 July 2021	9 June 2024	BJP
2	Ashwini Vaishnaw	Rajya Sabha (Odisha)	Cabinet Minister	Communications	7 July 2021	9 June 2024	BJP
2	Ashwini Vaishnaw	Rajya Sabha (Odisha)	Cabinet Minister	Electronics and Information Technology	7 July 2021	9 June 2024	BJP
3	Bishweswar Tudu	Mayurbhanj	Minister of State	Tribal Affairs	7 July 2021	9 June 2024	BJP
3	Bishweswar Tudu	Mayurbhanj	Minister of State	Jal Shakti	7 July 2021	9 June 2024	BJP

== Assembly segments wise lead of parties ==
Party	Assembly segments	Position in Assembly (as of 2019 simultaneous elections)
Biju Janata Dal	88	113
Bharatiya Janata Party	47	23
Indian National Congress	7	9
Others	–	2
Total	147	
