= 1998 Indian general election in Orissa =

- 16, 22 and 28 February 1998

21 (of 543) seats in the Lok Sabha
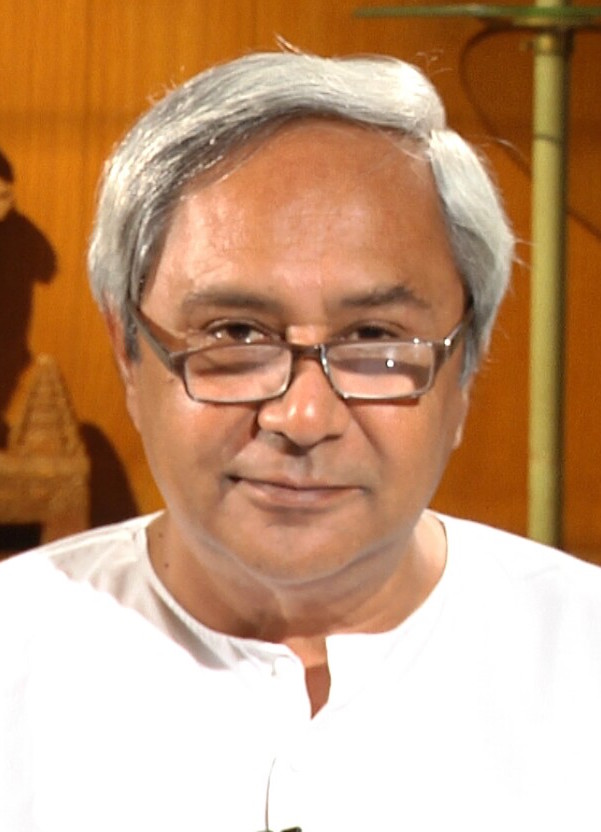

| | First party | Second party | Third party |
|---|---|---|---|
| Leader | Naveen Patnaik |
| Party | BJD | BJP | INC |
| Alliance | NDA | NDA | - |
| Seats won | 9 | 7 | 5 |
| Seat change | ▲9 | ▲7 | ▼11 |
| Popular vote | 3,669,825 | 2,828,709 | 5,477,410 |
| Percentage | 27.50% | 21.19% | 41.04% |
| Swing | ▲27.50% | ▲7.77% | ▲3.86% |
Prime Minister before election
Inder Kumar Gujral
JD
Prime Minister after election
Atal Bihari Vajpayee
BJP

1998 Indian general election in Orissa were held on 16, 22 and 28 February 1998 to elect the members of the twelfth Lok Sabha. The elections were held three years ahead of schedule after the government led by Inder Kumar Gujral collapsed when the Indian National Congress (INC) withdrew its support in November 1997.

The result was another hung parliament, with no party or alliance able to muster a majority. However, Atal Bihari Vajpayee of the Bharatiya Janata Party was able to form a coalition government led by the National Democratic Alliance with the outside support of the Telugu Desam Party. He was sworn in as Prime Minister with support from 272 of 543 MPs. However, his government collapsed on 17 April 1999 when the All India Anna Dravida Munnetra Kazhagam withdrew its support, after Vajpayee refused to meet the demands of its leader J. Jayalalithaa, namely halting the corruption cases against her and the sacking of the Tamil Nadu government led by her bete-noire M. Karunanidhi. This led to fresh elections in 1999.

The elections were the second consecutive general elections in which the party that received the most votes did not win the most seats.

In Orissa, the Biju Janata Dal (BJD) was formed in 1998 after breaking away from the Janata Dal. In its debut in the 1998 general election, the BJD allied with the Bharatiya Janata Party (BJP) and won nine seats. Following this victory, Naveen Patnaik was appointed Union Minister for Mines. Together, the BJP–BJD alliance secured 16 out of the 21 Lok Sabha seats in the state, while the Janata Dal suffered a major defeat, with its vote share reduced to just 4 percent.

== Seat sharing of parties ==
| Party/Alliance | | Flag | Electoral symbol | Leader | Seats contested |
|---|---|---|---|---|---|
| Indian National Congress | | | | Giridhar Gamang | 21 |
| National Democratic Alliance | Biju Janata Dal | | | Naveen Patnaik | 12 |
| National Democratic Alliance | Bharatiya Janata Party | | | Atal Bihari Vajpayee | 9 |

== List of Candidates ==
| Constituency | | NDA | | INC | | JD+ | |
| No. | Name | Party | Candidate | Party | Candidate | Party | Candidate |
|---|---|---|---|---|---|---|---|
| 1 | Mayurbhanj (ST) | BJP | Salkhan Murmu | INC | Susila Tiria | JD | Chaitanya Prasad Majhi |
| 2 | Balasore | BJP | M. A. Kharabela Swain | INC | Kartik Mohapatra | JD | Ananta Majhi |
| 3 | Bhadrak (SC) | BJD | Arjun Charan Sethi | INC | Muralidhar Jena | JD | Bairagi Jena |
| 4 | Jajpur (SC) | BJD | Jagannath Mallik | INC | Rama Chandra Mallick | JD | Mohan Jena |
| 5 | Kendrapara | BJD | Prabhat Kumar Samantaray | INC | Archana Nayak | JD | Srikanta Kumar Jena |
| 6 | Cuttack | BJD | Bhartruhari Mahatab | INC | Syed Mustafiz Ahmed | JD | Ranendra Pratap Swain |
| 7 | Jagatsinghpur | BJD | Trilochan Kanungo | INC | Ranjib Biswal | CPI | Abani Boral |
| 8 | Puri | BJD | Braja Kishore Tripathy | INC | Pinaki Mishra | JD | Durga Charan Routray |
| 9 | Bhubaneswar | BJD | Prasanna Kumar Patasani | INC | Saumya Ranjan Pattanaik | CPI(M) | Shivaji Pattanaik |
| 10 | Aska | BJD | Naveen Patnaik | INC | Chandra Sekhar Sahoo | CPI | Nityananda Pradhan |
| 11 | Berhampur | BJP | Gopinath Gajapati Narayandeo | INC | Jayanti Patnaik | CPI(M) | Ali Kishore Pattanaik |
| 12 | Koraput (ST) | BJD | Jayaram Pangi | INC | Giridhar Gamang | JD | Sankar Bidika |
| 13 | Nowrangpur (ST) | BJP | Parsuram Majhi | INC | Khagapati Pradhani | JD | Bhagaban Majhi |
| 14 | Kalahandi | BJP | Bikram Keshari Deo | INC | Bhakta Charan Das | JD | Duryodhan Majhi |
| 15 | Phulbani (SC) | BJD | Padmanava Behera | INC | Mrutyunjaya Nayak | JD | Lecturer Bullion |
| 16 | Bolangir | BJP | Sangeeta Kumari Singhdeo | INC | Sarat Pattanayak | JD | Pradeep Kumar Maharana |
| 17 | Sambalpur | BJD | Prasanna Acharya | INC | Krupasindhu Bhoi | JD | Bijaya Singh Bariha |
| 18 | Deogarh | BJP | Debendra Pradhan | INC | Shriballav Panigrahi | JD | Rabi Narayan Pani |
| 19 | Dhenkanal | BJD | Tathagata Satapathy | INC | Kamakshya Prasad Singhdeo | JD | Sarat Kumar Mishra |
| 20 | Sundargarh (ST) | BJP | Jual Oram | INC | Sunil Kumar Singhdeo | Did not contest | |
| 21 | Keonjhar (ST) | BJP | Upendranath Nayak | INC | Madhaba Sardar | JD | Saharai Oram |

== Election Voter Turnout ==
| # | Constituency Name | Turnout |
|---|---|---|
| 1 | Mayurbhanj (ST) | 65.25% |
| 2 | Balasore | 66.62% |
| 3 | Bhadrak (SC) | 60.80% |
| 4 | Jajpur (SC) | 54.98% |
| 5 | Kendrapara | 59.88% |
| 6 | Cuttack | 56.95% |
| 7 | Jagatsinghpur | 64.15% |
| 8 | Puri | 61.80% |
| 9 | Bhubaneswar | 53.20% |
| 10 | Aska | 51.02% |
| 11 | Berhampur | 50.76% |
| 12 | Koraput (ST) | 47.34% |
| 13 | Nowrangpur (ST) | 55.89% |
| 14 | Kalahandi | 61.14% |
| 15 | Phulbani (SC) | 56.22% |
| 16 | Bolangir | 58.18% |
| 17 | Sambalpur | 59.79% |
| 18 | Deogarh | 59.80% |
| 19 | Dhenkanal | 54.43% |
| 20 | Sundargarh (ST) | 58.68% |
| 21 | Keonjhar (ST) | 62.42% |

== Results by Party/Alliance ==
| Alliance/ Party | | Popular vote | | | Seats | | |
| Alliance/ Party | | Votes | % | ±pp | Contested | Won | +/− |
|---|---|---|---|---|---|---|---|
| NDA | BJD | 36,69,825 | 27.50 | New entry | 12 | 9 | New entry |
| NDA | BJP | 28,28,709 | 21.19 | ▲7.77 | 9 | 7 | ▲7 |
| NDA | Total | 64,98,534 | 48.69 | Steady | 21 | 16 | Steady |
| INC | | 54,77,410 | 41.04 | ▼3.86 | 21 | 5 | ▼11 |
| JD+ | JD | 6,57,790 | 4.93 | ▼25.12 | 16 | 0 | ▼4 |
| JD+ | CPI | 1,32,089 | 0.99 | ▲0.65 | 2 | 0 | Steady |
| JD+ | CPI(M) | 54,217 | 0.41 | ▼1.28 | 2 | 0 | Steady |
| JD+ | Total | 8,44,096 | 6.33 | Steady | 20 | 0 | Steady |
| JMM | | 2,83,943 | 2.13 | ▲0.58 | 2 | 0 | |
| Others | | 1,87,133 | 1.40 | Steady | 50 | 0 | Steady |
| IND | | 55,156 | 0.41 | ▼5.27 | 21 | 0 | Steady |
| Total | | 1,33,46,272 | 100% | - | 135 | 21 | - |

== Detailed Results ==
| Constituency | | Winner | | | | Runner Up | | | | Margin | % |
| # | Name | Candidate | Party | Votes | % | Candidate | Party | Votes | % | Margin | % |
|---|---|---|---|---|---|---|---|---|---|---|---|
| 1 | Mayurbhanj (ST) | Salkhan Murmu | BJP | 2,49,255 | 42.09 | Susila Tiria | INC | 1,74,936 | 29.54 | 74,319 | 12.55 |
| 2 | Balasore | M. A. Kharabela Swain | BJP | 4,21,068 | 53.17 | Kartik Mohapatra | INC | 3,37,066 | 42.56 | 84,002 | 10.61 |
| 3 | Bhadrak (SC) | Arjun Charan Sethi | BJD | 3,50,322 | 49.99 | Muralidhar Jena | INC | 3,16,744 | 45.20 | 33,578 | 4.79 |
| 4 | Jajpur (SC) | Rama Chandra Mallick | INC | 2,83,455 | 45.72 | Jagannath Mallik | BJD | 1,91,591 | 30.90 | 91,864 | 14.82 |
| 5 | Kendrapara | Prabhat Kumar Samantaray | BJD | 2,82,736 | 43.27 | Archana Nayak | INC | 2,74,911 | 42.07 | 7,825 | 1.20 |
| 6 | Cuttack | Bhartruhari Mahatab | BJD | 3,50,314 | 52.89 | Syed Mustafiz Ahmed | INC | 2,37,620 | 35.87 | 1,12,694 | 17.02 |
| 7 | Jagatsinghpur | Ranjib Biswal | INC | 3,37,492 | 44.84 | Trilochan Kanungo | BJD | 3,17,563 | 42.19 | 19,929 | 2.65 |
| 8 | Puri | Braja Kishore Tripathy | BJD | 3,58,978 | 51.51 | Pinaki Mishra | INC | 3,06,433 | 43.97 | 52,545 | 7.54 |
| 9 | Bhubaneswar | Prasamna Kumar Patasani | BJD | 3,78,849 | 57.61 | Saumya Ranjan Pattanaik | INC | 2,50,941 | 38.16 | 1,27,908 | 19.45 |
| 10 | Aska | Naveen Patnaik | BJD | 3,10,751 | 53.89 | Chandra Sekhar Sahoo | INC | 2,24,540 | 38.94 | 86,211 | 14.95 |
| 11 | Berhampur | Jayanti Patnaik | INC | 2,71,044 | 49.05 | Gopinath Narayandeo | BJP | 2,35,804 | 42.68 | 35,240 | 6.37 |
| 12 | Koraput (ST) | Giridhar Gamang | INC | 2,67,425 | 53.92 | Jayaram Pangi | BJD | 1,85,909 | 37.48 | 81,516 | 16.44 |
| 13 | Nowrangpur (ST) | Khagapati Pradhani | INC | 2,80,444 | 50.06 | Parsuram Majhi | BJP | 2,06,509 | 36.86 | 73,935 | 13.20 |
| 14 | Kalahandi | Bikram Keshari Deo | BJP | 3,44,703 | 56.55 | Bhakta Charan Das | INC | 2,24,789 | 36.88 | 1,19,914 | 19.67 |
| 15 | Phulbani (SC) | Padmanava Behera | BJD | 3,32,786 | 54.95 | Mrutyunjaya Nayak | INC | 2,41,714 | 39.91 | 91,072 | 15.04 |
| 16 | Bolangir | Sangeeta Kumari Singhdeo | BJP | 3,60,575 | 61.75 | Sarat Pattanayak | INC | 2,02,044 | 34.60 | 1,58,531 | 27.15 |
| 17 | Sambalpur | Prasanna Acharya | BJD | 3,10,870 | 45.77 | Krupasindhu Bhoi | INC | 2,86,102 | 42.12 | 24,768 | 3.65 |
| 18 | Deogarh | Debendra Pradhan | BJP | 3,46,820 | 52.34 | Shriballav Panigrahi | INC | 2,41,393 | 36.43 | 1,05,427 | 15.91 |
| 19 | Dhenkanal | Tathagata Satapathy | BJD | 2,99,156 | 51.02 | Kamakshya Prasad Singhdeo | INC | 2,66,645 | 45.48 | 32,511 | 5.54 |
| 20 | Sundargarh (ST) | Jual Oram | BJP | 3,16,069 | 47.71 | Sunil Kumar Singhdeo | INC | 1,90,041 | 28.69 | 1,26,028 | 19.02 |
| 21 | Keonjhar (ST) | Upendranath Nayak | BJP | 3,47,906 | 54.09 | Madhaba Sardar | INC | 2,61,631 | 40.68 | 86,275 | 13.41 |

== Post-election Union Council of Ministers from Orissa ==
| # | Name | Constituency | Designation | Department | From | To | Party |
|---|---|---|---|---|---|---|---|
| 1 | Naveen Patnaik | Aska | Cabinet Minister | Steel | 19 March 1998 | 13 Oct 1999 | BJD |
| 1 | Naveen Patnaik | Aska | Cabinet Minister | Mines | 19 March 1998 | 13 Oct 1999 | BJD |
| 2 | Dilip Ray | Rajya Sabha (Odisha) | MoS(I/C) | Coal | 20 March 1998 | 13 Oct 1999 | BJD |
| 2 | Dilip Ray | Rajya Sabha (Odisha) | MoS | Parliamentary Affairs | 22 May 1998 | 13 Oct 1999 | BJD |
