= Mangaraj Mallik =

Indian politician

Member of Parliament, Lok Sabha
- In office 1989–1991
- Preceded by: Arjun Charan Sethi
- Succeeded by: Ananta Prasad Sethi
- Constituency: Bhadrak, Odisha

Personal details
- Born: November 6, 1948 (age 77) Mirgahatkul, Balasore district, Odisha
- Party: Janata Dal
- Spouse: Tapaswini Mallik
- Children: 1 son and 4 daughters

Mangaraj Mallik is an Indian politician. He was elected to the Lok Sabha, the lower house of the Parliament of India from Bhadrak in Odisha as a member of the Janata Dal.
