= Ananta Prasad Sethi =

Indian politician from Odisha

Member of Parliament, Lok Sabha
- In office 1984–1989
- Preceded by: Arjun Charan Sethi
- Succeeded by: Mangaraj Mallik
- Constituency: Bhadrak (SC)

Member of Odisha Legislative Assembly
- In office 2004–2009
- Preceded by: Ratha Das
- Succeeded by: Prafulla Samal
- Constituency: Bhandaripokhari

Personal details
- Born: 17 July 1951 (age 75)
- Party: Indian National Congress
- Spouse: Savitri Sethi
- Children: 2 son and 2 daughter
- Parent: Ramachandra Sethi (father)
- Education: Fakir Mohan University (B.Sc)

Ananta Prasad Sethi (born 17 July 1951) is an Indian politician active in Odisha politics as a worker of the Indian National Congress. He was a Lok Sabha MP from 1984 to 1989, elected from Bhadrak (SC) and a member of the Odisha Legislative Assembly from 2004 to 2009, elected from Bhandaripokhari.
