= Dhanurjaya Sidu =

Indian politician

Dhanurjay Sidu

Personal details
- Profession: Politician

Dhanurjay Sidu is an Indian politician from the Indian National Congress and was a member of the Odisha Legislative Assembly from 2004 to 2009, representing the Champua assembly constituency of Odisha.
