= Bhrugu Baxipatra =

Indian politician

- Succeeded by: Taraprasad Bahinipati
- Constituency: Jeypore Odisha

Personal details
- Born: 1974 (age 51–52) Koraput, Orissa
- Party: BJD

Bhrugu Baxipatra is a politician from Odisha, India. He is a member of the Biju Janata Dal and represents the Jeypore constituency of Odisha. He is the son of Late Harish Chandra Baxipatra, ex-MLA of Koraput constituency and an ex-minister of Odisha Government.

== Early life ==
Baxipatra is the son of Late Harish Chandra Baxipatra, a former India politician representing the state of Orissa. Bhrugu Baxipatra completed his BA degree from Berhampur University in the academic year 1997-1998, and went on to obtain an LLB from Utkal University in the academic year 1999-2000.

== Political career ==
Baxipatra was a member of Bharatiya Janata Party and left BJP on 3 April 2024 and joined BJD on the same day. In 2019 Indian general election, he contested from Berhampur Lok Sabha constituency from BJP, but lost. In 2024 Indian general election, he contested from Berhampur Lok Sabha constituency again from BJD, but lost.
