= Manjulata Mandal =

Politician from Odisha, India

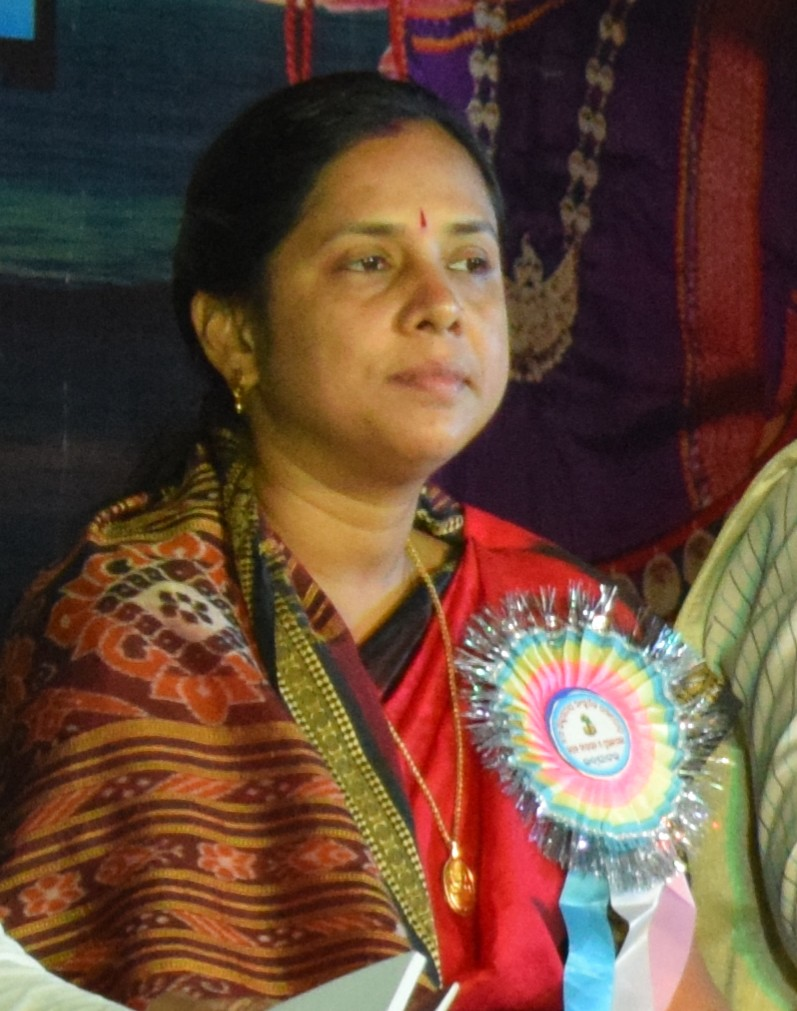

Member of Parliament, Lok Sabha
- In office 23 May 2019 – 4 June 2024
- Preceded by: Arjun Charan Sethi
- Succeeded by: Avimanyu Sethi
- Constituency: Bhadrak

Personal details
- Born: 26 June 1976 (age 50) Samaraipur, Bhadrak district, Odisha
- Party: Biju Janata Dal (until 2026); Bharatiya Janata Party (2026–present)
- Spouse: Muktikanta Mandal
- Children: 2
- Parent(s): Padmanava Das, Jemamani Das
- Profession: Politician

Manjulata Mandal is an Indian politician. She was elected to the Lok Sabha, the lower house of the Parliament of India, from Bhadrak, Odisha, in the 2019 Indian general election, as a member of the Biju Janata Dal.

In April 2026, Mandal left the BJD along with her husband, former Dhamnaga MLA Muktikanta Mandal after both were suspended from the BJD for alleged anti-party activities. Both later joined the Bharatiya Janata Party on 1 July.
