= Avimanyu Sethi =

Member of the Lok Sabha

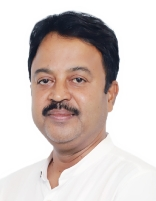

Member of Parliament, Lok Sabha
- Incumbent
- Assumed office 4 June 2024
- Preceded by: Manjulata Mandal
- Constituency: Bhadrak, Odisha

Personal details
- Born: 29 June 1970 (age 55)
- Party: Bharatiya Janata Party
- Spouse: Shrabani Priyadarshini
- Parent(s): Arjun Charan Sethi, Subhadra
- Occupation: Politician

Avimanyu Sethi is an Indian politician from Bhandaripokhari, Odisha. He was elected as a Member of Parliament from Bhadrak Lok Sabha constituency. He belongs to Bharatiya Janata Party.
