= Arjun Charan Sethi =

Indian politician (1941–2020)

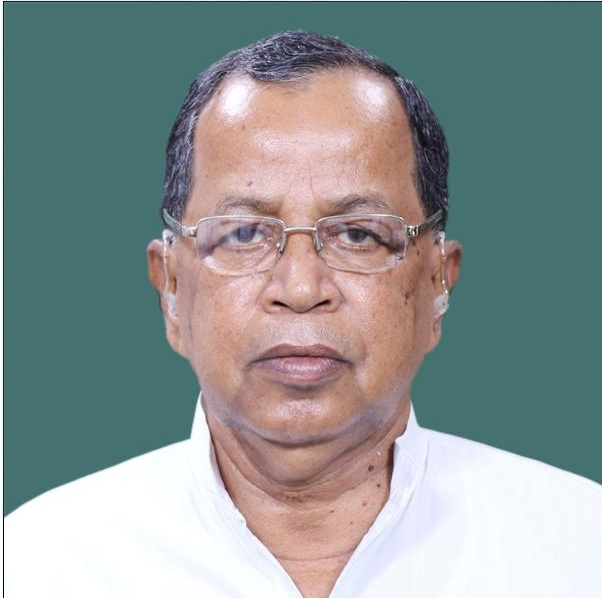

Member: 5th, 7th, 10th, 12th, 13th, 14th, 15th and 16th Lok Sabha
- Succeeded by: Manjulata Mandal
- Constituency: Bhadrak

Personal details
- Born: 18 September 1941 Odang, Bhadrak, Odisha
- Died: 8 June 2020 (aged 78) Bhubaneswar, Odisha
- Party: BJP
- Spouse: Subhadra Sethi
- Children: 3 Sons And 2 Daughters
- As of 22 September, 2006

Arjun Charan Sethi ([ɔrd͡ʒunɔ t͡ʃɔɾɔɳɔ seʈʰi]) (18 September 1941 – 8 June 2020) was an Indian politician.

He represented Bhadrak constituency in the Lok Sabha from 1998 to 2019, as well as 1991 to 1996, 1980 to 1984 and 1971 to 1977.

Over his career, he belonged first to Congress Party, later to Biju Janata Dal, and finally BJP at the time of his death.

In 1971, he was elected to the Lok Sabha from Bhadrak as a Congress candidate for the first time. He was re-elected in 1980 from the same constituency as an Indian National Congress (I) candidate. He was re-elected to the Lok Sabha in 1991 as a Janata Dal candidate from the same constituency. He was re-elected to the Lok Sabha in 1998, 1999, 2004 and 2009 from the same constituency as a Biju Janata Dal candidate. He was the Union Minister of water resources in Atal Bihari Vajpayee led government from 2000 to 2004.

In 2019, he left Biju Janata Dal to join Bharatiya Janata Party with his son Abhimanyu Sethi. He died on 8 June 2020, in a hospital in Bhubaneswar.

== See also ==
- Indian general election in Orissa, 2009

Party political offices
Preceded by	Leader of the Biju Janata Dal Party in the 15th Lok Sabha; 2009–2014	Succeeded by Bhartruhari Mahtab
