= Cuttack Lok Sabha constituency =

Lok Sabha constituency in Odisha

Coordinates: 20.460691°N 85.889718°E

Cuttack OD-14
- Lok Sabha constituency
- Interactive Map Outlining Cuttack Lok Sabha constituency

Constituency details
- Country: India
- Region: East India
- State: Odisha
- Assembly constituencies: Baramba; Banki; Athagarh; Barabati-Cuttack; Choudwar-Cuttack; Cuttack Sadar; Khandapada
- Established: 1952
- Total electors: 15,74,979 (Note: as on 2024) (Note: as data published by election commission)
- Reservation: None

Member of Parliament
- 18th Lok Sabha
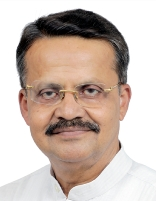
- Incumbent Bhartruhari Mahtab
- Party: BJP
- Elected year: 2024

Cuttack Lok Sabha Constituency is one of the 21 Lok Sabha (Parliamentary) Constituencies in Odisha state in Eastern India.

== Assembly Segments ==
Assembly Constituencies which constitute this Parliamentary Constituency, after delimitation of Parliamentary Constituencies and Legislative Assembly Constituencies of 2008 are:

#	Name	District	Member	Party	Leading (in 2024)
87	Baramba	Cuttack	Bijaya Kumar Dalabehera	IND	BJP
88	Banki	Cuttack	Devi Ranjan Tripathy	BJD	BJD
89	Athagarh	Cuttack	Ranendra Pratap Swain	BJD	BJP
90	Barabati-Cuttack	Cuttack	Sofia Firdous	INC	BJP
91	Choudwar-Cuttack	Cuttack	Souvic Biswal	BJD	BJP
93	Cuttack Sadar (SC)	Cuttack	Prakash Chandra Sethi	BJP	BJP
120	Khandapada	Nayagarh	Dusmanta Kumar Swain	BJP	BJP

Assembly Constituencies which constituted this Parliamentary Constituency, before delimitation of Parliamentary Constituencies and Legislative Assembly Constituencies of 2008 were: Salepur, Cuttack Sadar, Cuttack City, Tangi-Choudwar, Banki, Athagarh and Badamba.

== Elected members ==
Since its formation in 1952, 21 elections were held including three bypolls in 1952, 1980 and 1996.

List of members elected from Cuttack constituency are

Year	Member	Party
1952	Harekrushna Mahatab	Indian National Congress
1952^ (Note: Resignation of Harekrushna Mahatab)	Bira Kishore Ray (Note: Won Uncontested)	Indian National Congress
1957	Nityanand Kanungo	Indian National Congress
1962	Nityanand Kanungo	Indian National Congress
1967	Srinibas Mishra	Praja Socialist Party
1971	Janaki Ballabh Patnaik	Indian National Congress
1977	Sarat Kumar Kar	Bharatiya Lok Dal
1980	Janaki Ballabh Patnaik	Indian National Congress (I)
1981^ (Note: Resignation of Janaki Ballabh Patnaik)	Jayanti Patnaik	Indian National Congress (I)
1984	Jayanti Patnaik	Indian National Congress
1989	Srikant Kumar Jena	Janata Dal
1991	Srikant Kumar Jena	Janata Dal
1996	Biju Patnaik	Janata Dal
1996^ (Note: Resignation of Biju Patnaik)	Anadi Charan Sahu	Indian National Congress
1998	Bhartruhari Mahtab	Biju Janata Dal
1999	Bhartruhari Mahtab	Biju Janata Dal
2004	Bhartruhari Mahtab	Biju Janata Dal
2009	Bhartruhari Mahtab	Biju Janata Dal
2014	Bhartruhari Mahtab	Biju Janata Dal
2019	Bhartruhari Mahtab	Biju Janata Dal
2024	Bhartruhari Mahtab	Bharatiya Janata Party

- ^by-poll

== Election results ==
=== 2024 ===
Voting were held on 25th May 2024 in 6th phase of Indian General Election. Counting of votes was on 4th June 2024. In 2024 election, Bharatiya Janata Party candidate Bhartruhari Mahtab defeated Biju Janata Dal candidate Santrupt Mishra by a margin of 57,077 votes.

2024 Indian general election: Cuttack
Party	Candidate	Votes	%	±%
BJP	Bhartruhari Mahtab	531,601	47.78	▲9.44
BJD	Santrupt Mishra	4,74,524	42.65	▼7.20
INC	Suresh Mohapatra	83,815	7.53	▼1.89
NOTA	None of the above	8,159	0.73	▲0.05
Majority		1,123,741	47.78	▼6.38
Turnout		11,23,079	71.31	▲1.72
BJP gain from BJD				

=== 2019 ===
In 2019 election, Biju Janata Dal candidate Bhartruhari Mahtab defeated Indian National Congress candidate Panchanan Kanungo by a margin of 1,21,201 votes.

2019 Indian general elections: Cuttack
Party	Candidate	Votes	%	±%
BJD	Bhartruhari Mahtab	524,592	49.51	▼4.24
BJP	Prakash Mishra	4,03,391	38.07	▲23.15
INC	Panchanan Kanungo	99,847	9.42	▼12.99
NOTA	None of the above	7,236	0.68	▼0.22
Independent	Sanjaya Kumar Sahoo	5,899	0.56	▼0.02
BSP	Pramod Kumar Mallick	4,408	0.42	▲0.05
Majority		1,21,201	11.44	▼19.90
Turnout		10,60,459	69.81	▼1.68
BJD hold		Swing	▼4.24	

=== 2014 ===
In 2014 election, Biju Janata Dal candidate Bhartruhari Mahtab defeated Indian National Congress candidate Aparajita Mohanty by a margin of 3,06,762 votes.

2014 Indian general elections: Cuttack
Party	Candidate	Votes	%	±%
BJD	Bhartruhari Mahtab	526,085	53.75	▼3.34
INC	Aparajita Mohanty	2,19,323	22.41	▼5.7
BJP	Samir Dey	1,46,093	14.92	▲5.62
AOP	M. A. Kharabela Swain	58,246	5.95	New
NOTA	None of the above	8,889	0.90	
Independent	Sanjay Kumar Sahu	5,733	0.58	
Majority		3,06,762	31.34	▲2.29
Turnout		9,80,556	71.49	▲8.11
BJD hold		Swing	▼3.34	

=== 2009 ===
In 2009 election, Biju Janata Dal candidate Bhartruhari Mahtab defeated Indian National Congress candidate Bibhuti Bhusan Mishra by a margin of 2,36,292 votes.

2009 Indian general elections: Cuttack
Party	Candidate	Votes	%	±%
BJD	Bhartruhari Mahtab	465,089	57.15	
INC	Bibhuti Bhusan Mishra	2,28,797	28.11	
BJP	Anadi Charan Sahu	75,118	9.23	
Bira Oriya Party	Kapila Charan Mall	25,395	3.12	
Majority		2,36,292	29.05	
Turnout		8,13,499	63.38	
BJD hold				

=== 1991 ===
1991 Indian general election: Cuttack
Party	Candidate	Votes	%	±%
JD	Srikanta Jena	287,907	49.89	
INC	Janakiballav Patnaik	244,214	42.32	
BJP	Nayanranjan Bhagat	30,421	5.27	
JP	Mohammed Manawar	6,123	1.06	
IND	Chittaranjan Das	2,372	0.41	
IND	Basanta Kumar Puspalak	2,074	0.36	
IND	Balakrushna Behera	1,596	0.28	
IND	Dhrub Charan Sahu	858	0.15	
IND	Gobardhan Parida	659	0.11	
IND	Narayan Mallik	483	0.08	
IND	Gadadhar Barik	370	0.06	
Majority		43,693	7.57	
Turnout		586,457	59.37	
JD hold		Swing		

=== 1989 ===
1989 Indian general election: Cuttack
Party	Candidate	Votes	%	±%
JD	Srikanta Jena	414,828	64.60	
INC	Jayanti Patnaik	210,143	32.72	
JP	Samanta Narayan Srichandan Mahapatra	7,577	1.18	
BSP	Banudhar Sethy	4,366	0.68	
DLP (Note: Barat Desam Labour Party)	Dhrubananda Behra	2,646	0.41	
IND	Dhruba Charan Sahu	1,377	0.21	
DDP	Soubhagya Das	1,217	0.19	
Majority		204,685	31.88	
Turnout		655,187	68.02	
Swing to JD from INC		Swing		

=== 1984 ===
1984 Indian general election: Cuttack
Party	Candidate	Votes	%	±%
INC	Jayanti Patnaik	263,960	55.46	
JP	Jogesh Chandra Rout	185,039	38.88	
IND	Chitaranjan Das	10,729	2.25	
IND	Amar Ray	7,315	1.54	
IND	Sunakar Behura	3,013	0.63	
IND	Umesh Chandra Mohapatra	2,586	0.54	
IND	Biakunth Charan Pattanaik	1,484	0.31	
IND	Binod Misra	1,029	0.22	
IND	Prasan Kumar Parida	822	0.17	
Majority		78,921	16.58	
Turnout		485,934	64.32	
Swing to INC from INC(I)		Swing		

=== 1981 by-election ===
1981 Lok Sabha by-election: Cuttack
Party	Candidate	Votes	%	±%
INC(I)	Jayanti Patnaik	156,906	55.94	
LKD	R. Ray	107,054	38.17	
IND	N. Misra	6,727	2.40	
IND	N. C. Mallik	4,987	1.78	
IND	B. Nayak	3,201	1.14	
IND	K. M. Routray	1,599	0.57	
Majority		49,852	17.77	
Turnout				
INC(I) hold		Swing		

=== 1980 ===
1980 Indian general election: Cuttack
Party	Candidate	Votes	%	±%
INC(I)	Janaki Ballav Patnaik	219,831	61.54	
INC(U)	Trilochan Kanugo	95,879	26.84	
JP	Rajendra Singh	28,224	7.90	
IND	Narasingh Misra	13,304	3.72	
Majority		123,952	34.70	
Turnout		368,514	52.28	
Swing to INC(I) from JP		Swing		

=== 1977 ===
1977 Indian general election: Cuttack
Party	Candidate	Votes	%	±%
JP	Sarat Kumar Kar	176,445	55.03	
INC	Janaki Ballav Patnaik	116,043	36.19	
IND	Narasingh Misra	13,864	4.32	
IND	Narayan Das	10,605	3.31	
IND	Sarangdhar Muduli	3,674	1.15	
Majority		60,402	18.84	
Turnout		330,152	52.92	
Swing to JP from INC		Swing		

=== 1971 ===
1971 Indian general election: Cuttack
Party	Candidate	Votes	%	±%
INC	Janki Ballav Patnaik	154,707	54.48	
Utkal Congress	Biren Mitra	74,615	26.27	
PSP	Biswanath Pandit	34,468	12.14	
INC(O)	Satyabadi Misra	11,973	4.22	
IND	Akshya Kumar Mohanty	8,227	2.90	
Majority		80,092	28.21	
Turnout		297,637	50.80	
Swing to INC from PSP		Swing		

=== 1967 ===
1967 Indian general election: Cuttack
Party	Candidate	Votes	%	±%
PSP	S. Misra	103,710	39.24	
INC	B. C. Mohanti	91,572	34.65	
SWA	G. C. Das	36,423	13.78	
IND	S. Patnaik	32,595	12.33	
Majority		12,138	4.59	
Turnout		276,875	50.56	
Swing to PSP from INC		Swing		

=== 1962 ===
1962 Indian general election: Cuttack
Party	Candidate	Votes	%	±%
INC	Nityanand Kanungo	88,340	56.50	
PSP	Nishamani Khuntia	64,387	41.18	
IND	Syed Fazal Haque	3,619	2.31	
Majority		23,953	15.32	
Turnout		162,723	33.56	
INC hold		Swing		

=== 1957 ===
1957 Indian general election: Cuttack
Party	Candidate	Votes	%	±%
INC	Nityananda Kanungo	90,779	50.88	
PSP	Sarangadhar Das	87,629	49.12	
Majority		3,150	1.76	
Turnout		178,408	41.07	
INC hold		Swing		

=== 1952 by-election ===
1952 Indian by-election election: Cuttack
Party	Candidate	Votes	%	±%
INC	Bira Kishore Ray	0	0.00	
Majority		Uncontested		
Turnout		0	0.00	
INC hold		Swing		

=== 1952 ===
1951–52 Indian general election: Cuttack
Party	Candidate	Votes	%	±%
INC	Harekrushna Mahatab	89,387	54.46	
CPI	Baidyanath Rath	39,576	24.11	
Socialist	Lakhminarayan Sahu	25,306	15.42	
KMPP	Khitish Ch. Ray	9,876	6.02	
Majority		49,811	30.35	
Turnout		164,145	41.09	
INC win (new seat)				

== See also ==
- Cuttack
- List of constituencies of the Lok Sabha
