= Bhartruhari Mahtab =

Indian politician (born 1957)

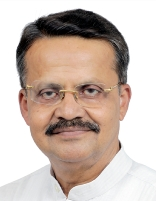
- Official Portrait

Pro-tem Speaker of 18th Lok Sabha
- In office 24 June 2024 – 26 June 2024
- President: Droupadi Murmu
- Preceded by: Virendra Kumar Khatik (Note: Om Birla as Speaker)

Member of Parliament, Lok Sabha
- Incumbent
- Assumed office March 1998
- Constituency: Cuttack, Odisha
- Preceded by: Anadi Charan Sahu

Personal details
- Born: 8 September 1957 (age 69) Agarpada, Odisha, India
- Party: Bharatiya Janata Party (2024–present)
- Other political affiliations: Biju Janata Dal (1998–2024)
- Spouse: Mahasweta Mahtab (m. 1982)
- Children: 2
- Parent(s): Harekrushna Mahatab (father); Subhadra Mahatab (mother)
- Education: Utkal University
- Profession: Journalist; politician

Bhartruhari Mahtab (born 8 September 1957) is an Indian politician from Odisha. He served as the pro tem speaker of the Lok Sabha from 24 June 2024 to 26 June 2024 after the 2024 Indian general election. He was a member of Lok Sabha from 1998 to 2024 as member of the Biju Janata Dal (BJD). Ahead of the 2024 elections, he quit BJD and joined the Bharatiya Janata Party. He is awarded with Sansad Ratna awards in 2025 for his excellence performance in parliamentary duties.

== Early life ==
Mahtab is the son of late Harekrushna Mahatab, who served two times as the Chief Minister of Odisha.

== Career ==
Mahtab was a member of the Biju Janata Dal (BJD) political party, and resigned from the BJD to join the Bharatiya Janata Party (BJP) on 28 March 2024 before the Lok Sabha elections. He was elected to the 12th Lok Sabha in 1998 from the Cuttack constituency of Odisha. He was re-elected to the Lok Sabha in 1999, 2004, 2009, 2014 and 2019 from the same constituency. He received the Outstanding Parliamentarian Award in 2017. He is also the recipient of Sansad Ratna Award in 2017, 2018, 2019 and 2020 for his outstanding performance in 'Debates'. He was appointed as the pro-tem speaker of the 18th Lok Sabha on 20 June 2024 by President Droupadi Murmu under the Article 95(1) of the Constitution of India, with the office coming into effect from the first day of the sitting of the 18th Lok Sabha i.e. 24 June 2024 and served till 24 June 2024 until Om Birla was re-elected as the Speaker of the Lok Sabha on the same day through voice-voting system.

== Positions held ==
03 Sep 2026 onwards Member, Joint Committee on the Foreign Contribution (Regulation) Amendment Bill, 2026

10-Feb-2026 - Member, Joint Committee on the Viksit Bharat Shiksha Adhishthan Bill, 2025

12-Nov-2025 - Member, The Joint Committee on The Constitution (One Hundred and Thirtieth Amendment) Bill, 2025; The Jammu and Kashmir Reorganisation (Amendment) Bill, 2025; and The Government Of Union Territories (Amendment) Bill, 2025

14-Feb-2025 - Member, Select Committee of Lok Sabha to Examine the Income Tax Bill, 2025

20-Dec-2024 - Member, The Joint Committee on the Constitution (One Hundred and Twenty– Ninth Amendment) Bill, 2024 and the Union Territories Laws (Amendment) Bill, 2024.

21-Oct-2024 - Member, Consultative Committee for Ministry of Petroleum and Natural Gas

26-Sep-2024 onwards Chairperson, Committee on Finance

18-Sep-2024 - Deputy Chairman, Committee of Parliament on Official Language

18-Jul-2024 - Member, Business Advisory Committee

June 2024 Elected to 18th Lok Sabha

2 June 2024 Resigned

1 May 2020 onwards Member, Committee on Public Accounts 21 Nov. 2019 onwards Member, General Purposes Committee, Lok Sabha

Member, Consultative Committee, Ministry of Human Resource Development

14 Sept. 2019 onwards Vice-President, Parliamentary Committee on Official Language

13 Sept. 2019 onwards Chairperson, Standing Committee on Labour, Textiles and Skill Development

24 July 2019 - 30 April 2020 Member, Committee on Public Accounts

26 June 2019 onwards Member, Panel of Chairpersons, Lok Sabha

May, 2019 Re-elected to 17th Lok Sabha (6th term)

23 Sep. 2016 Member, Sub-Committee-VII (PPP Project) of Public Accounts Committee (2016–17)

11 May 2016 - 25 May 2019 Member, Joint Committee on the Enforcement of Security Interest and Recovery of Debts Laws and Miscellaneous Provision (Amendment) Bill, 2016

4 Sep. 2015 - 30 April 2016 Member, Sub-Committee-VI (XIX Commonwealth Games 2010) of the Public Accounts Committee (2015–16)

15 July 2015 - 30 April 2016 Member, Sub-Group on other Miscellaneous Matters, Public Accounts Committee

13 May 2015 - 25 May 2019 Member, Joint Committee on the Right to Fair Compensation and Transparency in Land Acquisition, Rehabilitation and Resettlement (Second Amendment) Bill, 2015

27 April 2015 - 25 May 2019 Chairperson, Railway Convention Committee (R.C.C.)

29 Jan. 2015 - 25 May 2019 Member, General Purposes Committee

Member, Joint Parliamentary Committee on Maintenance of Heritage Character and Development of Parliament House Complex 8 Oct. 2014 - 25 May 2019 Member, Committee on Installation of Potraits/Statues of National Leaders and Parliamentarians in Parliament House Complex

15 Sep. 2014 - 25 May 2019 Member, Committee on Ethics

Member, Standing Committee on Finance

Member, Consultative Committee, Ministry of Urban Development, Housing and Urban Poverty Alleviation

1 Sep. 2014 - 25 May 2019 Member, Rules Committee

14 Aug. 2014 - 30 April 2016 Member, Public Accounts Committee

May, 2014 Re-elected to 16th Lok Sabha (5th term)

Member, Parliamentary Forum on Global Warming and Climate change

Member, India-Botswana Parliamentary Friendship Group

Vice President, India-Cyprus Parliamentary Friendship Group

1 May 2010 Member, Committee on Public Accounts

Vice-President, India-Mexico Parliamentary Friendship Group

Member, Standing Committee on Finance

31 Aug. 2009 Member, Consultative Committee, Ministry of Environment & Forests

6 Aug. 2009 Member, Committee on Public Accounts

2009 Re-elected to 15th Lok Sabha (4th term)

Member, Youth Affairs & Sports and Development of North Eastern Region Special Invitee, Consultative Committee, Ministry of Panchayati Raj

Member, Consultative Committee, Ministry of Information & Broadcasting

1 May 2008 Member, Committee on Public Accounts 5 Aug. 2007 Member, Standing Committee on Finance

2005-2006 Member, Committee on Public Accounts

Member, Consultative Committee, Ministry of Information and Broadcasting and Ministry of Culture

2004-2005 Member, Committee on Estimates

Member, Standing Committee on Finance

2004 Re-elected to 14th Lok Sabha( 3rd term)

2000-2004 Member, Consultative Committee, Ministry of Agriculture Member, Joint Committee on the Central Vigilance Commission Bill, 1999

Member, Standing Committee on Communications and Information Technology

Member, Public Accounts Committee Member, Standing Committee on Commerece Member, Standing Committee on Labour

1999-2004 Member, Committee of Privileges

1999 Re-elected to 13th Lok Sabha (2nd term)

Member, Joint Parliamentary Committee on the functioning of Wakf Boards

Member, Consultative Committee, Ministry of Tourism

Member, Central Advisory Board of Education

Member, Standing Committee on External Affairs

1998-99 Member, Committee of Privileges

1998 Elected to 12th Lok Sabha

== See also ==
- Indian general election, 2014 (Odisha)

== Notes ==
Party political offices
Preceded by Arjun Charan Sethi	Leader of the Biju Janata Dal Party in the 16th Lok Sabha; 2014–2019	Succeeded by
