= Bhadrak Lok Sabha constituency =

Lok Sabha constituency in Odisha

Coordinates: 21.055805°N 86.499699°E

Bhadrak (SC) OD-7
- Lok Sabha constituency
- Interactive Map Outlining Bhadrak Lok Sabha constituency

Constituency details
- Country: India
- Region: East India
- State: Odisha
- Assembly constituencies: Soro; Simulia; Bhandaripokhari; Bhadrak; Basudevpur; Dhamnagar; Chandabali
- Established: 1962
- Total electors: 17,73,928 (Note: as on 2024) (Note: as data published by election commission)
- Reservation: SC

Member of Parliament
- 18th Lok Sabha
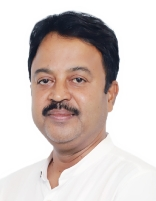
- Incumbent Avimanyu Sethi
- Party: BJP
- Elected year: 2024

Bhadrak Lok Sabha constituency is one of the 21 Lok Sabha (parliamentary) constituencies in Odisha state in eastern India.

== Assembly Segments ==
Assembly Constituencies which constitute this Parliamentary Constituency, after delimitation of Parliamentary Constituencies and Legislative Assembly Constituencies of 2008 are:

#	Name	District	Member	Party	Leading (in 2024)
41	Soro (SC)	Balasore	Madhab Dhada	BJD	BJP
42	Simulia	Balasore	Padma Lochan Panda	BJP	BJP
43	Bhandaripokhari	Bhadrak	Sanjib Kumar Mallick	BJD	BJD
44	Bhadrak	Bhadrak	Sitansu Sekhar Mohapatra	BJP	BJP
45	Basudevpur	Bhadrak	Ashok Kumar Das	INC	BJP
46	Dhamnagar (SC)	Bhadrak	Suryabanshi Suraj	BJP	BJP
47	Chandabali	Bhadrak	Byomakesh Ray	BJD	BJD

== Elected members ==
Vote share of winning candidates
2024	44.19%
2019	41.78%
2014	34.19%
2009	30.37%
2004	52.47%
1999	58.52%
1998	49.99%
1996	47.04%
1991	43.34%
1989	57.25%
1984	55.49%
1980	58.46%
1977	60.97%
1971	45.5%

Since its formation in 1962, 16 elections have been held till date.

List of members elected from Bhadrak constituency are

Year	Member	Party
1952	Kanhu Charan Jena	Indian National Congress
1957	Kanhu Charan Jena	Indian National Congress
1962	Kanhu Charan Jena	Indian National Congress
1967	Dharanidhar Jena	Independent politician
1971	Arjun Charan Sethi	Indian National Congress
1977	Bairagi Jena	Bharatiya Lok Dal
1980	Arjun Charan Sethi	Indian National Congress (I)
1984	Ananta Prasad Sethi	Indian National Congress
1989	Mangaraj Mallik	Janata Dal
1991	Arjun Charan Sethi	Janata Dal
1996	Muralidhar Jena	Indian National Congress
1998	Arjun Charan Sethi	Biju Janata Dal
1999	Arjun Charan Sethi	Biju Janata Dal
2004	Arjun Charan Sethi	Biju Janata Dal
2009	Arjun Charan Sethi	Biju Janata Dal
2014	Arjun Charan Sethi	Biju Janata Dal
2019	Manjulata Mandal	Biju Janata Dal
2024	Avimanyu Sethi	Bharatiya Janata Party

== Election results ==
=== 2024 ===
Voting were held on 1st June 2024 in 7th phase of Indian General Election. Counting of votes was on 4th June 2024. In 2024 election, Bharatiya Janata Party candidate Avimanyu Sethi defeated Biju Janata Dal candidate Manjulata Mandal by a margin of 91,544 votes.

2024 Indian general election: Bhadrak
Party	Candidate	Votes	%	±%
BJP	Avimanyu Sethi	573,319	44.19	▲4.68
BJD	Manjulata Mandal	4,81,775	37.13	▼2.38
INC	Ananta Prasad Sethi	2,21,874	17.10	▲0.12
NOTA	None of the above	5,478	0.42	
Majority		91,544	7.06	
Turnout		13,03,583	73.49	
BJP gain from BJD				

=== 2019 ===
In 2019 election, Biju Janata Dal candidate Manjulata Mandal defeated Bharatiya Janata Party candidate Avimanyu Sethi by a margin of 28,803 votes.

2019 Indian general elections: Bhadrak
Party	Candidate	Votes	%	±%
BJD	Manjulata Mandal	512,305	41.86	▼4.59
BJP	Avimanyu Sethi	4,83,502	39.51	▲19.45
INC	Madhumita Sethi	2,07,811	16.98	▼12.88
NOTA	None of the above	6,536	0.53	
BSP	Muralidhar Jena	4,708	0.38	
AITC	Tilottama Jena	3,327	0.27	
Majority		28,803	2.35	
Turnout		12,28,046	73.90	
BJD hold		Swing	▼4.59	

=== 2014 ===
In 2014 election, Biju Janata Dal candidate Arjun Charan Sethi defeated Indian National Congress candidate Sangram Keshari Jena by a margin of 1,79,359 votes.

2014 Indian general elections: Bhadrak
Party	Candidate	Votes	%	±%
BJD	Arjun Charan Sethi	502,338	46.45	
INC	Sangram Keshari Jena	3,22,979	29.86	
BJP	Sarat Dash	2,16,617	20.03	
CPI	Ramesh Chandra Jena	11,930	1.10	
BSP	Arjun Charan Mallik	7,607	0.70	
NOTA	None of the above	6,750	0.62	
Majority		1,79,359	16.59	
Turnout		10,81,971	73.63	
BJD hold				

=== 2009 ===
In 2009 election, Biju Janata Dal candidate Arjun Charan Sethi defeated Indian National Congress candidate Ananta Prasad Sethi by a margin of 54,938 votes.

2009 Indian general elections: Bhadrak
Party	Candidate	Votes	%	±%
BJD	Arjun Charan Sethi	416,808	30.37	
INC	Ananta Prasad Sethi	361,870	26.37	
BJP	Ratha Das	122,431	8.92	
Majority		54,938	5.91	
Turnout		9,29,162	67.71	
BJD hold				
