= M. A. Kharabela Swain =

Indian politician

Member: 13th and 14th Lok Sabha
- In office 1998–2009
- Preceded by: Kartik Mohapatra
- Succeeded by: Srikant Kumar Jena
- Constituency: Balasore

Personal details
- Born: Mahameghabahan Aira Kharabela Swain; 25 October 1953 (age 72) Arasa, Tihidi, Bhadrak, Odisha
- Party: Bharatiya Janata Party
- Other political affiliations: Utkal Bharat
- Spouse: Kalpana Swain
- Children: 1 Son

Mahameghabahan Aira Kharabela Swain (born 25 October 1953) was a member of the 14th Lok Sabha of India. He had represented the Balasore constituency of Odisha and was a member of the Bharatiya Janata Party (BJP) political party. He is the founder of the new political party Utkal Bharat.

He resigned from Utkal Bharat Party and Rejoin Bharatiya Janata Party in March 2019 in the presence of central Minister Dharmendra Pradhan.

== Utkal Bharat ==
Utkal Bharat was a political party of Odisha, India. Kharbela Swain is its founder and was its president. Utkal Bharat was formed on 2 February 2010. After its formation, the party has faced Athagarh bypoll election with the candidate named "Bratati Chatterjee", then panchayat, municipality, and general election as well.

Together with the Aama Odisha Party, Utkal Bharat sought an alliance with the Bharatiya Janata Party for the 2014 Indian general election. However, no deal was reached with the BJP. Afterward, Utkal Bharat and Aama Odisha Party formed an alliance of their own, deciding to contest elections jointly on the earthen pot symbol (allotted to the Aama Odisha Party by the Election Commission of India). Including the party, BJP declared mahamenta (a grand alliance) in Odisha, Arun Jaitley and Chandan Mitra came to Odisha to declare the alliance and talk held between Mahamegha Bahan Aira Kharbela Swain, Soumya Ranjan Patnaik, Arun Jaitley, Chandan Mitra, Braja Tripathy and other BJP leaders but after arriving at Delhi they broke the alliance. The party Utkal Bharat says there held an agreement between BJD and BJP government.

After the general election, the party gave 67 candidates in Jilla Parishad elections but did not win any seats. Now the party has organised "Odisha Bhagya Pariwartan Yatra" to reach near the people of Odisha. Later on, the party leader returned to BJP in 2019 election.
