= Malayagiri =

Mountain in Odisha, India

- Location within Odisha

Highest point
- Elevation: 1,188 m (3,898 ft)
- Coordinates: 21°22′N 85°16′E

Geography
- Location: Pallahara, Orissa, India
- Parent range: Garhjat Range

Climbing
- Easiest route: Hike/scramble

Malayagiri, is a mountain peak in the Malayagiri hills subrange of the Garhjat Range. It is located near Pal Lahara town near Angul in the Angul district of Odisha.

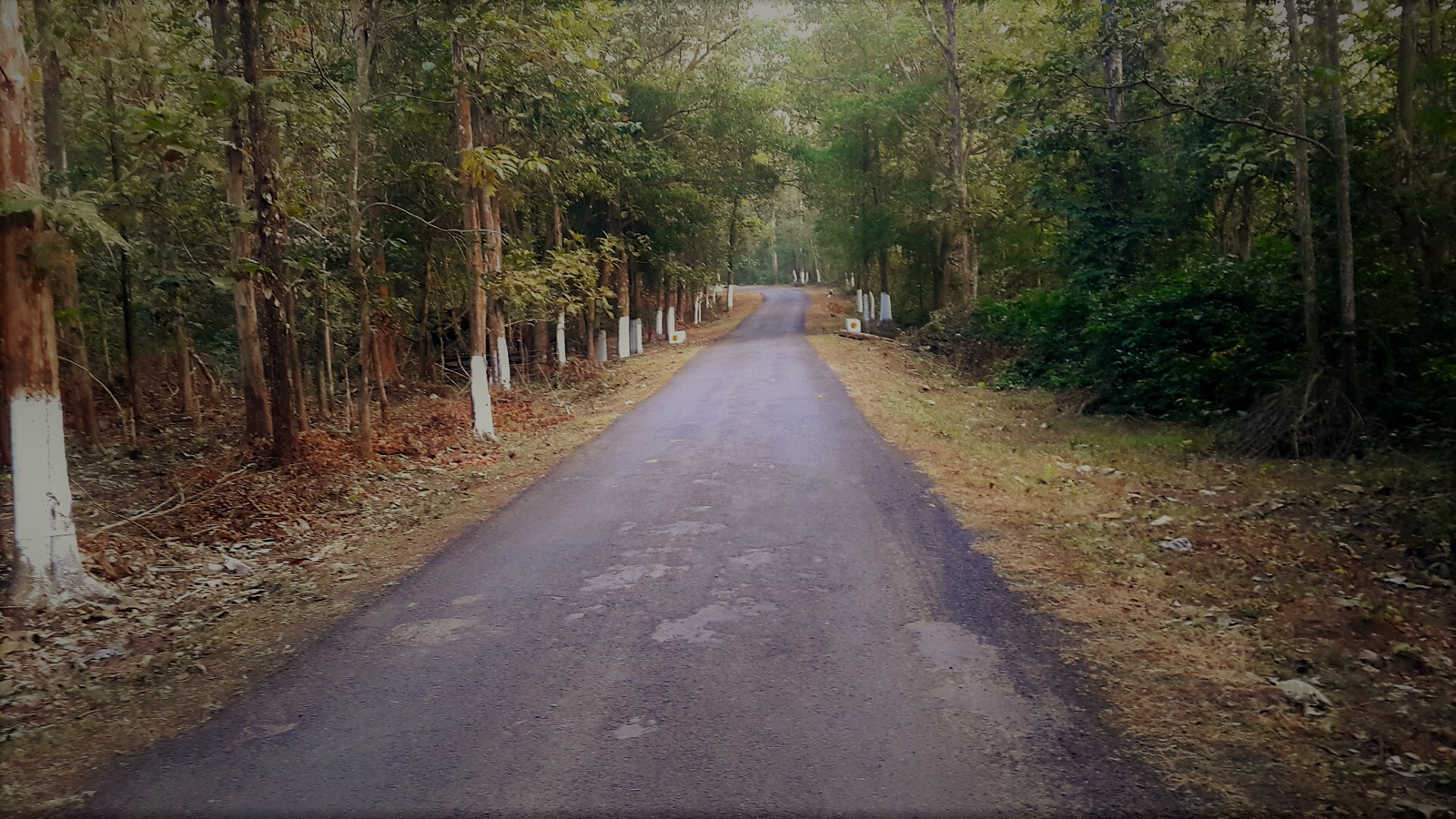
Malaygiri Hills

At 1,188 metres (3,898 ft), it is not the highest mountain in Orissa; Deomali is taller at 1672 meters, followed by 1643 m high Galikonda(Odisha).
