= Kanteikulia =

Kanteikulia Kanteikulia
- Village
- Location in Odisha, India Kanteikulia (India)
- Coordinates: 20°58′39″N 84°45′16″E
- Country: India
- State: Odisha
- District: Angul
- Tehsil: Kishorenagar

Languages
  - Official: Odia
- Time zone: UTC5:30 (IST)
- Vehicle registration: OD-35 (before OD-19/OR-19)

Kanteikulia, sometimes spelled Kanteikolia, is a small village and panchayat in Angul district, Odisha, India. The Khandanal River flows near the village. It is surrounded by sal forest. It is reached via National Highway 42 and about 6 kilometres (3.7 mi) north of Boinda, near the edges of the Bamur Forest Range. The panchayat covers an area of 591 acres (239 ha) Kanteikulia contains a notable Hindu temple, dedicated to Shiva.

An upper primary school, a post office and an ayurvedic dispensary situated there.
