= Angul Assembly constituency =

Constituency of the Odisha legislative assembly in India

Coordinates: 20.84°N 85.10°E

Angul
- Constituency No. 61 for the Odisha Legislative Assembly

Constituency details
- Country: India
- Region: East India
- State: Odisha
- Division: Northern Division
- District: Angul
- Lok Sabha constituency: Dhenkanal
- Established: 1951
- Total electors: 2,15,625 (Note: as on 2024) (Note: as data published by election commission)
- Reservation: None

Member of Legislative Assembly
- 17th Odisha Legislative Assembly
- Incumbent Pratap Chandra Pradhan
- Party: Bharatiya Janata Party
- Elected year: 2024

Angul is a Vidhan Sabha constituency of Angul district, Odisha, India.

== Constituent Areas ==
Sources:

- Angul
- Nalconagar
- 23 GPs of Angul block: Khalari, Kangulabentapur, Angar Bandha, Badakera, Rantalei, Chheliapada, Baluakata, Kumurisingha, Inkarbandha, Sankhapur, Pokatunga, Talagarh, Baragounia, Basala, Bedasasan, Khinda, Gadatarasa, Badakantakul, Dhokuta, Balasingha, Bantala, Nandapur and Balanga
- 13 GPs of Banarpal block: Bauligad, Bhogabereni, Bonda, Budhapank, Fulpada, Garhasantri, Gotamara, Balaramprasad, Kulad, Mahidharpur, Nuahata, Talmul and Tulasipal.

== Elected members ==
Vote share of winning candidates
2024	52.03%
2019	41.36%
2014	47.87%
2009	49.70%
2004	44.73%
2000	68.49%
1995	44.38%
1990	68.09%
1985	50.40%
1980	52.98%
1977	65.46%

Since its formation in 1951, 17 elections were held till date. It was a 2 member constituency for 1952 & 1957.

List of members elected from Angul constituency are:

Year	Member	Party
2024	Pratap Chandra Pradhan	Bharatiya Janata Party
2019	Rajani Kant Singh	Biju Janata Dal
2014	Rajani Kant Singh	Biju Janata Dal
2009	Rajani Kant Singh	Biju Janata Dal
2004	Rajani Kant Singh	Biju Janata Dal
2000	Adwait Prasad Singh	Biju Janata Dal
1995	Ramesh Jena	Indian National Congress
1990	Adwait Prasad Singh	Janata Dal
1985	Prafulla Misra	Indian National Congress
1980	Santosh Kumar Pradhan	Indian National Congress (I)
1977	Adwait Prasad Singh	Janata Party
1974	Adwait Prasad Singh	Utkal Congress
1971	Debaraja Sahu	Utkal Congress
1967	Kumuda Chandra Singh	Orissa Jana Congress
1961	Kumuda Chandra Singh	Orissa Jana Congress
1957 (Note: It was a 2 member constituency)	Narendra Kumar Nayak	Communist Party of India
1957	Kumuda Chandra Singh	Independent politician
1951 (Note: It was a 2 member constituency)	Arkhit Naik	Indian National Congress
1951	Hrushikesh Tripathy	Indian National Congress

== Election results ==
=== 2024 ===
Voting was held on 25 May 2024 in the third phase of the 2024 Odisha Legislative Assembly election and the sixth phase of the 2024 Indian general election. Votes were counted on 4 June 2024. In the election, Bharatiya Janata Party candidate Pratap Chandra Pradhan defeated Biju Janata Dal candidate Sanjukta Singh by a margin of 17,433 votes.

2024 Odisha Legislative Assembly election: Angul
Party	Candidate	Votes	%	±%
BJP	Pratap Chandra Pradhan	88,868	52.03	▲16.25
BJD	Sanjukta Singh	71,435	41.82	▲0.46
INC	Ambika Bhatta	6,653	3.89	▼15.45
SUCI(C)	Mandodari Raul	815	0.48	▲0.15
NOTA	None of the above	1,326	0.78	▲0.14
Majority		17,433	10.21	▲4.63
Turnout		1,70,817	79.22	▲6.72
BJP gain from BJD				

=== 2019 ===
In the 2019 election, Biju Janata Dal candidate Rajani Kant Singh defeated Bharatiya Janata Party candidate Pratap Chandra Pradhan by a margin of 8,823 votes.

2019 Odisha Legislative Assembly election: Angul
Party	Candidate	Votes	%	±%
BJD	Rajani Kant Singh	65,388	41.36	▼6.51
BJP	Pratap Chandra Pradhan	56,565	35.78	▲22.59
INC	Biplab Kumar Jena	30,572	19.34	▼15.08
NOTA	None of the above	1,019	0.64	▼0.54
Majority		8,823	5.58	▼7.87
Turnout		1,58,083	72.50	▼4.58
Registered electors		2,18,053		
BJD hold				

=== 2014 ===
In the 2014 election, Biju Janata Dal candidate Rajani Kant Singh defeated Indian National Congress candidate Pratap Chandra Pradhan by a margin of 20,343 votes.

2014 Odisha Legislative Assembly election: Angul
Party	Candidate	Votes	%	±%
BJD	Rajani Kant Singh	72,379	47.87	▼1.83
INC	Pratap Chandra Pradhan	52,036	34.42	▲1.29
BJP	Minaketan Amanta	19,948	13.19	▲3.69
NOTA	None of the above	1,787	1.18	New
Majority		20,343	13.45	▼3.12
Turnout		1,51,192	77.08	▲10.03
Registered electors		1,96,157		
BJD hold				

=== 2009 ===
In the 2009 election, Biju Janata Dal candidate Rajani Kant Singh defeated Indian National Congress candidate Sangram Keshari Mishra by a margin of 20,463 votes.

2009 Odisha Legislative Assembly election: Angul
Party	Candidate	Votes	%	±%
BJD	Rajani Kant Singh	61,381	49.70	–
INC	Sangram Keshari Mishra	40,918	33.13	–
BJP	Minaketan Amanta	11,731	9.50	–
Majority		20,463	16.57 (Note: Percentage of total valid votes.)	–
Turnout		1,23,521	67.05 (Note: Voter turnout in 2004 was 66.63%.)	▲0.42
Registered electors		1,84,218		
BJD hold				
