= Garhjat Hills =

Mountain range in India

Garhjat Range
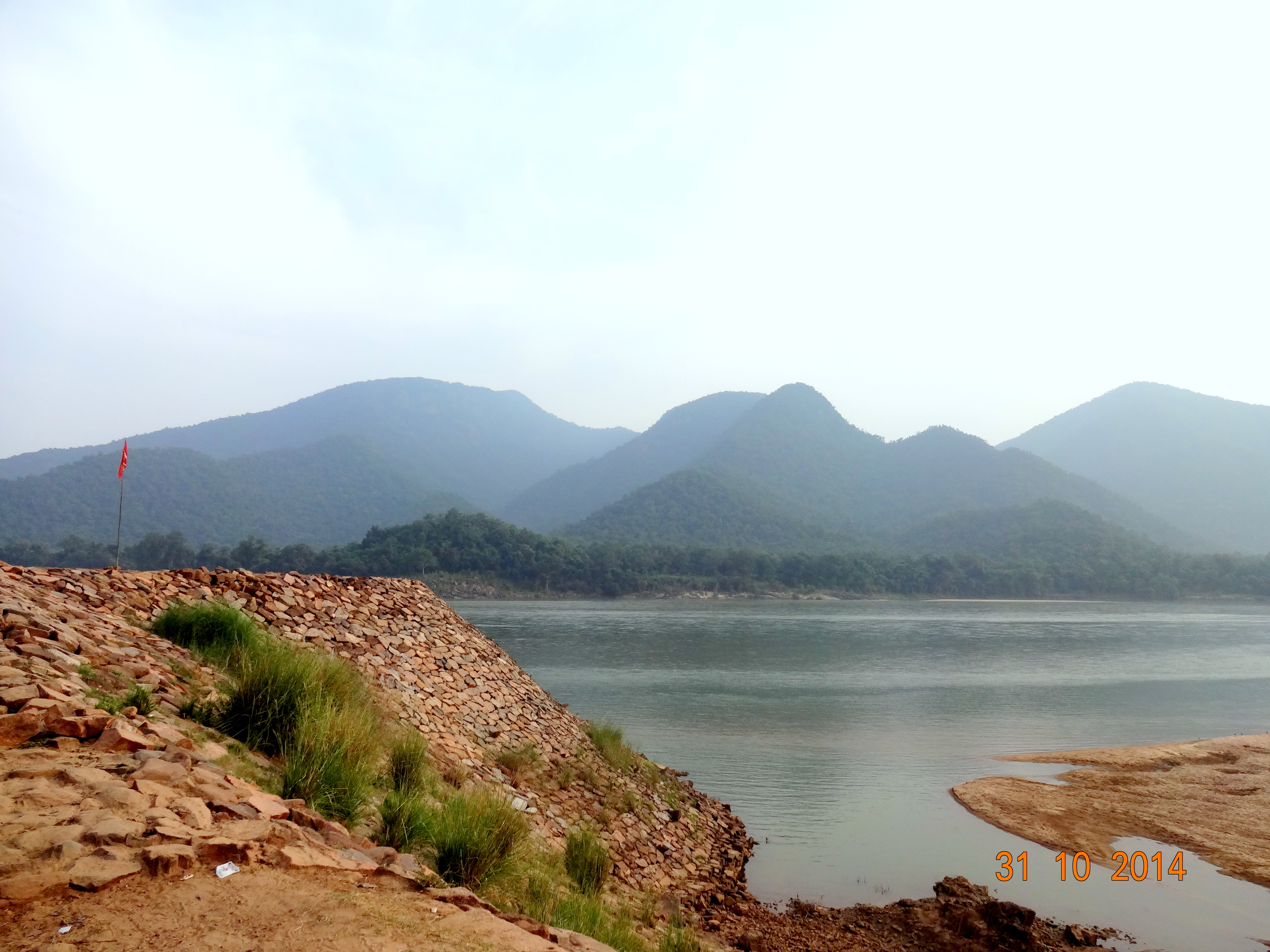
- View of the range in Binikeyee, Athmallik, Angul district

Highest point
- Peak: Malayagiri
- Elevation: 1,187 m (3,894 ft)

Dimensions
- Length: 382 km (237 mi) SW-NE
- Width: 100 km (62 mi)

Geography
- Location within Odisha
- Country: India
- States: Jharkhand, Chhattisgarh, Odisha
- Rivers: Brahmani, Mahanadi, Baitarani and Subarnarekha
- Range coordinates: 21°22′N 85°16′E

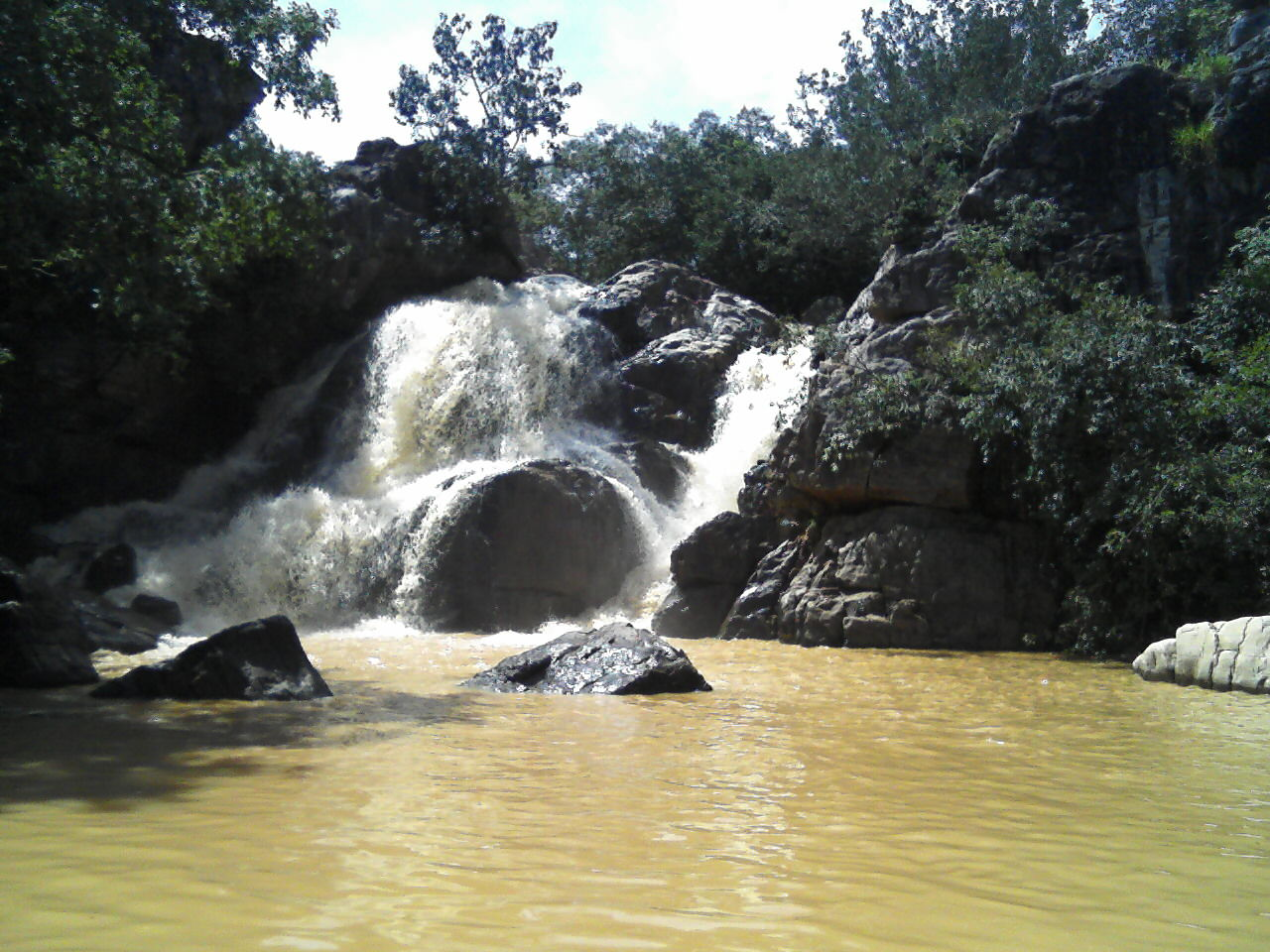
A waterfall in the area of the range, Kendujhar district.

The Garhjat Hills is a mountain range formed by a series low-lying hills, plateaux, ridges and meadows that stretch into Odisha from the Utkal Plains in the Chotanagpur region of Jharkhand and the Chhattisgarh Plains. The range, also known as the Odisha Highlands, runs in a north east to south west direction for about 382 km along the Odisha coast, covering 76,800 km^{2} (29,700 sq mi).

The range rises abruptly and steeply in the east and slopes gently to a dissected plateau in the west running from north-east (Mayurbhanj) to south-west (Malkangiri). The whole area is also marked by intermontane basins which cut across the region in a number of broad and narrow river valleys and flood plains. The average height of the range is about 900 metres above mean sea level.

== Etymology and History ==
Geographically the Garhjat Range is a northward prolongation of the Eastern Ghats. It derives its name from the Hindi term for 'fort', garh. The region was named by the Mughals who conquered Odisha under Akbar. Under the Marathas too Odisha was divided into the Mughalbandhi and Garhjat provinces and the latter was ruled by 24 vassal chiefs who paid tribute to the Marathas. These states, the Orissa Tributary States, later came to be known as the Garhjat states or the Garhjats because they were located in the region of the range.

These hills cover the present day districts of Sundargarh, Sambalpur, Deogarh, Jharsuguda, Baragarh, Angul and Kendujhar in northern Odisha. Rourkela in Sundargarh district is a major industrial town.

== Geology ==
The Garhjat hills are bounded by the Chotanagpur Plateau in the north, the Utkal plains in the east, the Mahanadi basin or the Chhattisgarh plains in the west and the Eastern Ghats to the south. Geologically, the region comprises crystalline rocks such as granites and gneisses that belong to the Archaean period. The Talcher, Barakar and Kamathi series of rocks containing shales and sandstones occur in the Sambalpur and Dhei districts.

== Drainage ==
The northern Garhjat hills are a part of the Chotanagpur plateau while the southern part is an extension of the Eastern Ghats and can be divided into three - the northern uplands, the Mahanadi valley, and the south-western hills. The important rivers that drain the Garhjat hills are the Brahmani, the Mahanadi, the Baitarani and the Subarnarekha. The Odisha Highlands are densely forested with tropical semi-evergreen and tropical dry and moist deciduous forests. The Scheduled Tribes account for as much as 37% of the region's population and the Gonds are a major tribal group of this region. Malaria is a major public health concern in these hills.

== Major Peaks ==
Some of the important peaks of the Garhjat Hills include the Malayagiri, Manakamacha and Meghasani. The Mahanadi river bisects these hills and to its south, the hills tend to gain elevation. The highest peak to the south is the Mahendragiri in Gajapati district.
