= Malisahi =

Village in Odisha, India

Coordinates: 20.822090°N 85.083195°E

Malisahi is a village in Angul district, Odisha, India. It is situated in the side of long-standing river. As of 2011 census its population was 1,570. A Shiva temple is situated in front of the long-standing river. Shivaratri is the biggest festival in this village.
