= Palalahada =

Palalahada Pallahara
- Town
- Location in Odisha Palalahada (India)
- Coordinates: 21°27′N 85°11′E
- Country: India
- State: Odisha
- District: Angul

Languages
  - Official: Odia
- Time zone: UTC5:30 (IST)
- Vehicle registration: OD-35 (Talcher); Nearest RTO; OD-28 (Deogarh)

Palalahada (formerly as Pallahara) is a town (N.A.C.) in Angul district of the state of Odisha and located on NH6, where it intersects with NH23, 91 kilometres (57 mi) by road north of Angul. Not far from the banks of the Rengali Reservoir which is to the west, the Malayagiri Forest Range is to the southeast. Palalahada is one of the sub-divisional headquarters in the Angul district.

== History ==
Palalahada was the capital of Pal Lahara State, which was a small princely state of British India.

The forests in the area were traditionally rich in bamboo and the local Juang people are adept at basketry.

== Connectivity ==
Palalahada is present nearly in the middle of Odisha. It has good connectivity to Bhubaneswar, Kendujhar, Rourkela, and Sambalpur by night buses. There is no train line to Palalahada. The nearest railway station to Palalahada is Talacher. The Bhubaneswar airport and Jharsuguda airport are nearly equal distances from Palalahada. The Palalahada is underdeveloped although it is the center of Odisha.

== Education ==
- Saraswati Sishu Vidya Mandir
- Town Model Primary School
- Town Girls High School
- Mahatab High School
- Nabajyoti High School
- Malyagiri Mahavidyalay Palalahada

Many students are working in national and International level from Palalahada as scientists engineers, doctors, professor, and also in the administrative work.

== Population ==
Palalahada Tahsil population in 2023 is 87,628. According to 2011 census of India, Total Palalahada population is 66,385 people are living in this Tahsil, of which 33,728 are male and 32,657 are female. Literate people are 37,556 out of 21,865 are male and 15,691 are female. Total workers are 31,416 depends on multi skills out of which 18,663 are men and 12,753 are women. Total 2,748 cultivators are depended on agriculture farming out of 2,429 are cultivated by men and 319 are women. 3,501 people works in agricultural land as a labour in Palalahada, men are 2,457 and 1,044 are women.

== Hospital ==
The Sub-Divisional Hospital Palalahada is the biggest hospital situated between the new stand and old bus stand of the Palalahada. Many people come for their health check-up. There is no private medical or Nursing home. All people depend only on the Govt hospital but lack of specialist doctors and adequate manpower plagues it.

== Temples ==
Palalahada is a culturally rich sub-division of the Angul district. The Presiding deity of Palalahada is Maa Kundheibira. It is believed that, Palalahada have been in the protection of this deity. In addition, temple of Lord Shiva, Jagganath, Hanuman and Kali also present in Palalahada. Each year, the Laxmi Puja celebrated for two weeks at Palalahada by preparing nearly 15 Medhas (statues) at different parts of the Palalahada. Many cultural programs are scheduled in this two weeks. People from nearby villages come to see the Laxmi puja and cultural programs.
