= Fertilizer Corporation of India Township =

- Town
- Location in Odisha, India Fertilizer Corporation of India Township (India)
- Coordinates: 20.9375°N 85.1587°E
- Country: India
- State: Odisha
- District: Angul

Population (2001)
  - Total: 7,059

Languages
  - Official: Odia
- Time zone: UTC+5:30 (IST)
- Vehicle registration: OD 35
- Website: odisha.gov.in

Fertilizer Corporation of India Township is a census town in Angul district in the state of Odisha, India.

== Demographics ==
As of 2001 India census, Fertilizer Corporation of India Township had a population of 7059. Males constitute 53% of the population and females 47%. Fertilizer Corporation of India Township has an average literacy rate of 91%, higher than the national average of 59.5%: male literacy is 93%, and female literacy is 89%. In Fertilizer Corporation of India Township, 6% of the population is under 6 years of age.
