= Dehurysahi =

Village in India

Coordinates: 20.735222°N 85.033130°E

Dehury sahi is a small village in Angul district, Odisha, India.
