= Rajanikant Singh =

Indian politician (born 1955)

Rajani Kant Singh
- ରଜନୀକାନ୍ତ ସିଂହ
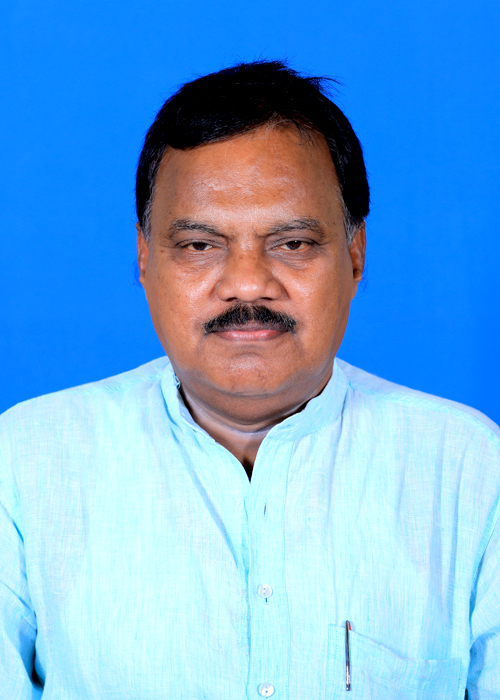

Deputy Speaker of the Odisha Legislative Assembly
- In office 27 June 2019 – 8 November 2023
- Speaker: Surjya Narayan Patro; Bikram Keshari Arukha; Pramila Mallik
- Preceded by: Sananda Marndi
- Succeeded by: Saluga Pradhan

Minister of State (Independent Charge) for Steel and Mines, Government of Odisha
- In office 2 August 2012 – 21 May 2014
- Chief Minister: Naveen Patnaik

Member of the Odisha Legislative Assembly
- In office 15 May 2004 – 3 June 2024
- Preceded by: Adwait Prasad Singh
- Succeeded by: Pratap Chandra Pradhan
- Constituency: Angul

Personal details
- Born: 1 April 1955 (age 71) Gotamara, Angul district, Odisha, India
- Party: Biju Janata Dal
- Spouse: Sanjukta Singh
- Children: 2
- Parent: Adwait Prasad Singh (father)
- Education: Utkal University (MA, LLB)

Rajani Kant Singh (born 1 April 1955), also spelled Rajanikant Singh, is an Indian politician from Odisha and a member of the Biju Janata Dal (BJD). He served four consecutive terms in the Odisha Legislative Assembly representing the Angul Assembly constituency from 2004 to 2024. During his legislative tenure, he served as Minister of State (Independent Charge) for Steel and Mines in the Third Naveen Patnaik ministry from 2012 to 2014 and as Deputy Speaker of the Odisha Legislative Assembly from 2019 to 2023.

== Early life and career ==
Singh was born on 1 April 1955 in Gotamara village in Angul district, Odisha, to politician and former state cabinet minister Adwait Prasad Singh. He completed a Master of Arts in Sociology and Labour Welfare as well as a Bachelor of Laws (LL.B.) degree.

Prior to entering electoral politics, Singh joined the National Aluminium Company (NALCO) in 1982. He worked at NALCO's Captive Power Plant division in Angul and held the position of Chief Manager (Administration) before taking voluntary retirement to contest the 2004 state assembly elections.

== Political career ==
Succeeding his father Adwait Prasad Singh as the Biju Janata Dal candidate for the Angul Assembly constituency, Singh was first elected to the 13th Orissa Legislative Assembly in the 2004 assembly election. He was subsequently re-elected from Angul in the 2009, 2014, and 2019 elections.

On 2 August 2012, Singh was inducted into the Third Naveen Patnaik ministry as Minister of State (Independent Charge) for Steel and Mines, serving until the completion of the 14th Assembly in May 2014.

Following his fourth consecutive victory in May 2019, Singh was elected unopposed as the Deputy Speaker of the 16th Odisha Legislative Assembly on 27 June 2019. Following the resignation of Speaker Bikram Keshari Arukha on 12 May 2023, Singh discharged the duties of Acting Speaker until Pramila Mallik was elected Speaker on 22 September 2023. He resigned as Deputy Speaker on 8 November 2023 and was succeeded by Saluga Pradhan on 21 November 2023.

Ahead of the 2024 Odisha Legislative Assembly election, Singh opted not to contest, and the Biju Janata Dal nominated his wife, Sanjukta Singh, from the Angul constituency; she was defeated by Bharatiya Janata Party candidate Pratap Chandra Pradhan.

== Personal life ==
Singh is married to Sanjukta Singh; the couple has one son and one daughter.
