= Deracolliery Township =

- Town
- Location in Odisha, India Deracolliery Township (India)
- Coordinates: 20.999°N 85.1381°E
- Country: India
- State: Odisha
- District: Angul

Population (2001)
  - Total: 18,583

Languages
  - Official: Odia
- Time zone: UTC+5:30 (IST)
- Vehicle registration: OD 35
- Website: odisha.gov.in

Deracolliery Township is a census town in Angul district in the state of Odisha, India.

== Demographics ==
As of 2001 India census, Deracolliery Township had a population of 18,583. Males constitute 55% of the population and females 45%. Deracolliery Township has an average literacy rate of 77%, higher than the national average of 59.5%: male literacy is 82% and, female literacy is 71%. In Deracolliery Township, 12% of the population is under 6 years of age.
