= P. K. Mahanandia =

Indian-Swedish artist

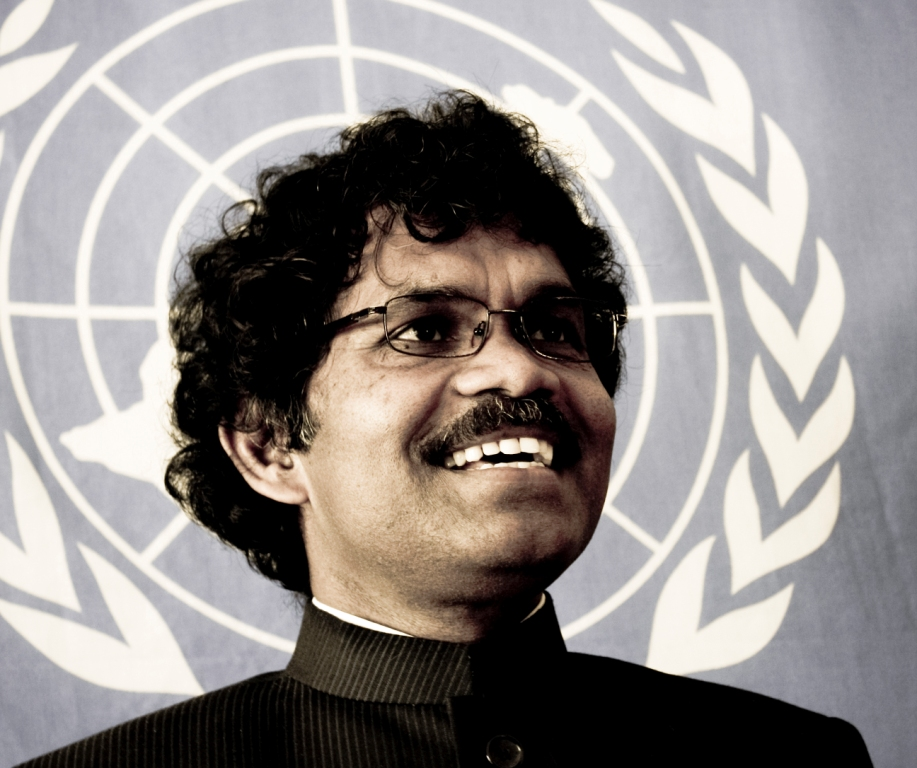
- Born: Pradyumna Kumar Mahanandia; 1949 (age 76–77); Athmallik, Orissa, India
- Education: College of Art, Delhi; Government College of Art and Crafts Khallikote
- Spouse: Ann-Charlotte Mahanandia Von Schedvin (m. 1975)
- Children: Siddharth, Emelie
- Website: pkmahanandia.com

Pradyumna Kumar Mahanandia (Odia: ପ୍ରଦ୍ୟୁମ୍ନ କୁମାର ମହାନନ୍ଦିଆ, born 1949) is an Indian-born Swedish artist noted for his journey by a second hand bicycle from New Delhi, India to Borås, Sweden in 1977 to reunite with his Swedish wife, Charlotte Von Schedvin.

== Early life and education ==
Mahanandia was born in 1949 in an Odia weaver family in the village of Kandhapada of the Athmallik sub-division in the district of Angul. His father was a postmaster in Athmallik, where he lived during the weeks and commuted home on the weekends by bicycle. The family later moved to Athmallik.

As his father was a member of the Pano caste, when young he often faced discrimination from upper-caste Indians because he was a Dalit and his mother was a member of the khond tribe. The khond is not included in the caste system of India and was therefore considered casteless.

Mahanandia attended Mahendra High School, Athmallik and later joined Visva-Bharati University to study art. Despite his admission to the art school, it became impossible for him to pay for tuition, so he had to return home. He later joined the Government College of Art and Crafts, Khallikote and then moved to the College of Art, Delhi in 1971.

== Portraiture and meeting Von Schedvin ==
While studying at the Delhi College of Art, he shot to fame in portraiture by drawing the portrait of Indira Gandhi. He sought permission from the authorities to sit under the fountain in Connaught Place and draw portraits. It is here that he met Charlotte Von Schedvin on 17 December 1975. She was a student in London, and had driven for 22 days in a van to India, just to visit Mahanandia and have her portrait done. That portrait changed their lives as they fell in love with each other and married. Von Schedvin had to return to Sweden and asked Mahanandia to come with her, but he decided that one day he would go on his own. After she left, the two kept in touch through letters.

Mahanandia did not have enough money to buy a plane ticket. He decided to sell everything, bought a bicycle and set off on his bike journey on 22 January 1977. He would cycle about 44 kilometres (27 mi) every day and supported himself by drawing portraits of people along the way who provided him with money, food and shelter. His travels took him through Afghanistan, Iran and finally through Turkey which allowed him to reach Europe on 28 May, then he continued to Gothenburg by train.

On his long bicycle journey he expressed the sentiment that he doesn't understand "Why people think it was a big deal to cycle to Europe?".

"I did what I had to, I had no money but I had to meet her. I was cycling for love, but never loved cycling. It's simple."

Mahandia and Shedvin have two children, now adults, Siddharth and Emelie.

== Recognition ==
Mahanandia is well known in Sweden as an artist and works as an adviser of art and culture for the Swedish government. His paintings have been exhibited in major cities of the world and appeared on UNICEF greeting cards. On 4 January 2012, he was awarded an honorary doctorate degree from Utkal University of Culture (UUC) in Bhubaneswar, Odisha. He was also designated as the Odia Cultural ambassador to Sweden by the Government of Odisha.

In 2010, Indian filmmaker Sanjay Leela Bhansali was planning to make a film on the love story of Mahanandia and Von Schedvin.

In 2025 the documentary "The Cycle of Love" was released.
