= Rengali Dam Projectship =

- Town
- Location in Odisha, India Rengali Dam Projectship (India)
- Coordinates: 21.63°N 84.05°E
- Country: India
- State: Odisha
- District: Anugul
- Elevation: 208 m (682 ft)

Population (2001)
  - Total: 8,115

Languages
  - Official: Odia
- Time zone: UTC+5:30 (IST)
- Vehicle registration: OD 35
- Website: odisha.gov.in

Rengali Dam Projectship is a census town in Anugul district in the Indian state of Odisha.

== Geography ==
Rengali is located at 21.63°N 84.05°E. It has an average elevation of 208 m (682 ft).

== Demographics ==
As of 2001 India census, Rengali Dam Projectship had a population of 8115. Males constitute 54% of the population and females 46%. Rengali Dam Projectship has an average literacy rate of 77%, higher than the national average of 59.5%: male literacy is 83%, and female literacy is 70%. In Rengali Dam Projectship, 9% of the population is under 6 years of age.
