= MPCL Thermal Power Station =

MPCL Thermal Power Project at Angul District in Odisha
- Official name: Monnet Power Company Limited TPS
- Country: India
- Location: Angul, Odisha
- Coordinates: 20.922°N 84.990°E
- Status: Under Construction
- Construction began: 2010
- Commission date: Under implementation
- Construction cost: Rs 26,300 Million
- Operator: Monnet Power Company Limited

Thermal power station
- Primary fuel: Coal

External links
- Website: www.monnetgroup.com

MPCL Thermal Power Project is located near Angul in Odisha. The power plant is one of the coal based power plants of Monnet Power Company Limited.

== Power Plant ==
The project was being sponsored by Monnet Power Company Limited, a subsidiary of Monnet Ispat and Energy Ltd and will use supercritical boiler technology supplied by BHEL.

State-run power equipment maker BHEL had bagged an order worth Rs 5,600 crore for 1050-megawatts (MW) power plant from MPCL for this project on turnkey basis.

The project was funded by a consortium of 27 banks, who has disbursed 85 percent of their sanctioned amount but due to a cost overrun in the project, the lenders were not keen to extend/enhance further credit to the company. This resulted in suspension of further funding to the construction works in the plant from mid 2014. Construction works remained suspended till 2022 when Jindal Steel & Power (JSP) won the bid for acquiring the power project for ₹410 crore through the insolvency route.

JSP is currently in the processing of commissioning and operationalizing the power plant which is expected to provide power to the steel plant which is located nearby.

Company is also planning another 660MW unit at the same site.

General timelines for construction of the plant include -

- Year 2011 -
  - Commencement of civil works at BTG (Boiler Turbine & Generator) Area
  - Commencement of earthworks for Cooling Tower Area
  - Rehabilitation of R&R colony
- Year 2012 -
  - Structural erection works for Boiler and ESP
  - Civil works for Turbine Hall
  - Civil Works for cooling tower & twin flue chimney
  - Boiler Drum installation
- Year 2013
  - Condenser installation
  - Turbine Installation
  - ESP Mechanical installation
  - Twin Flues for Chimneys
  - Unit Transformers installation

== Installed Capacity ==
Stage	Unit Number	Installed Capacity (MW)	Date of Commissioning	Status
Stage I	2x525	1050	-	Under Construction
