= Talcher Thermal Power Station Township =

- Town
- Location in Odisha, India Talcher Thermal Power Station Township (India)
- Coordinates: 20.9388°N 85.2232°E
- Country: India
- State: Odisha
- District: Anugul

Population (2001)
  - Total: 6,616

Languages
  - Official: Odia
- Time zone: UTC+5:30 (IST)
- Vehicle registration: OD 35
- Website: odisha.gov.in

Talcher Thermal Power Station Township is a census town in Anugul district in the Indian state of Odisha. Talcher Thermal Power Station is one of the thermal power stations of NTPC Ltd.

== Demographics ==
As of 2001 India census, Talcher Thermal Power Station Township had a population of 6616. Males constitute 55% of the population and females 45%. Talcher Thermal Power Station Township has an average literacy rate of 85%, higher than the national average of 59.5%: male literacy is 89%, and female literacy is 80%. In Talcher Thermal Power Station Township, 8% of the population is under 6 years of age.

There is one sports stadium, Market complex and Talcher Thermal Railway Halt.

== See also ==
- Talcher
