= Panchdhar Range =

Mountain range in India

- Panchadhara Ghati; Panchadhara hills
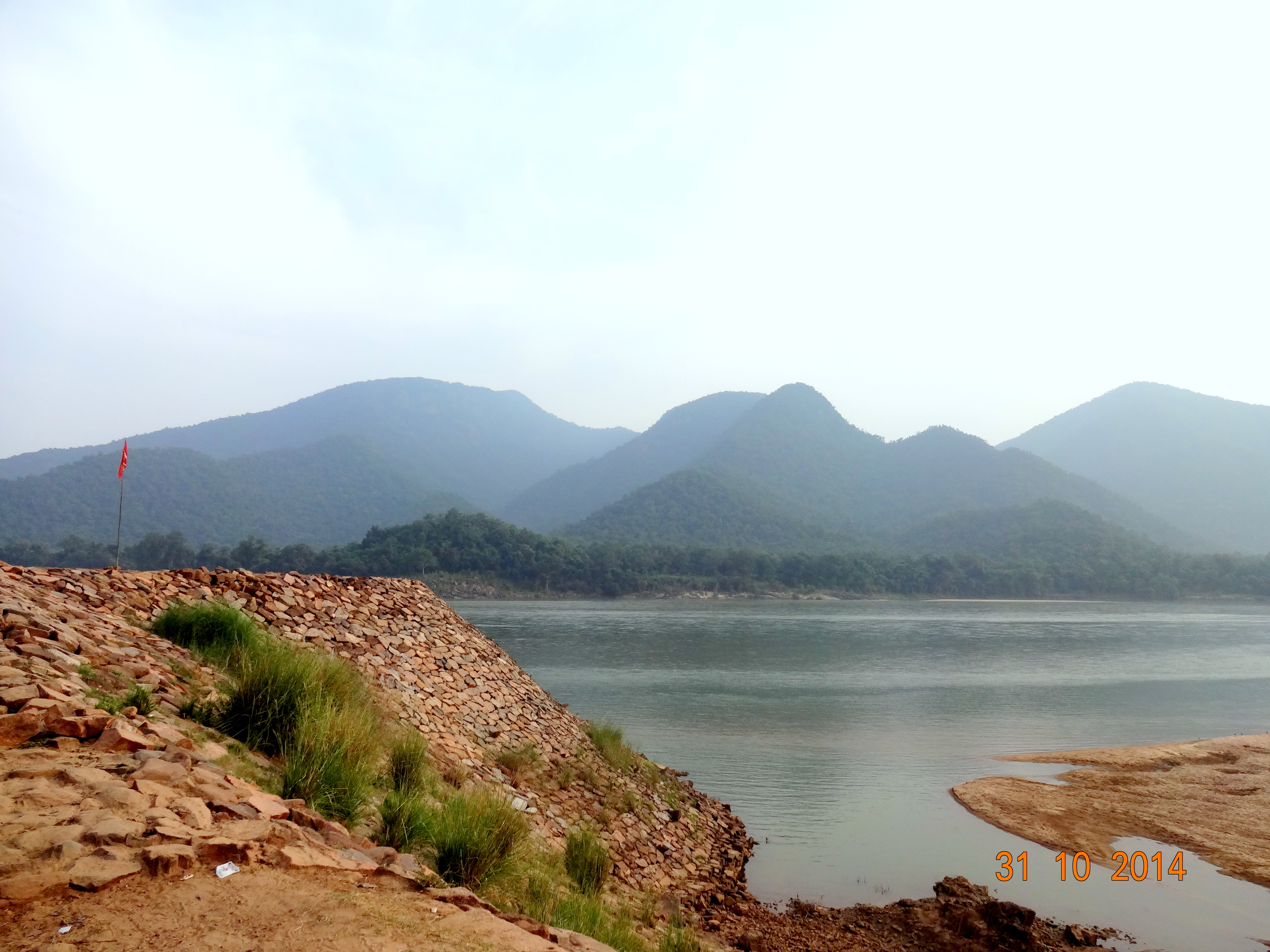
- Panchdhar Range

Highest point
- Elevation: 803 m (2,635 ft)
- Coordinates: 20°44′54″N 84°37′33″E

Dimensions
- Length: 100 km (62 mi) NW-SE
- Width: 5 km (3.1 mi) NE-SW

Geography
- Country: India
- State: Odisha
- District: Anugul District
- Biome: Tropical forests

The Panchdhar Range is a small mountain range in Anugul District, State of Odisha, India. It is a transverse range in the Eastern Ghats running northwest to southeast with a maximum height of 803 metres (2,635 ft)

The Panchdhar Range is located mostly in Anugul District but extends to the southeast slightly into Cuttack District. In its northwestern portion it forms the boundary between Athmallik and Thakurgarh. It is bounded on the southwest by the lower course of the Mahanadi river and the Satkosia Gorge. On the northeast it is bounded by the headwaters of the Nigra River, a tributary of the Brahmani.

The Tikarpada Wildlife Sanctuary and Satkosia Tiger Reserve are located at the southeast end of the range.
