= Athmallik =

Town in Angul district, Odisha, India

- Town and Sub-Divisional headquarter
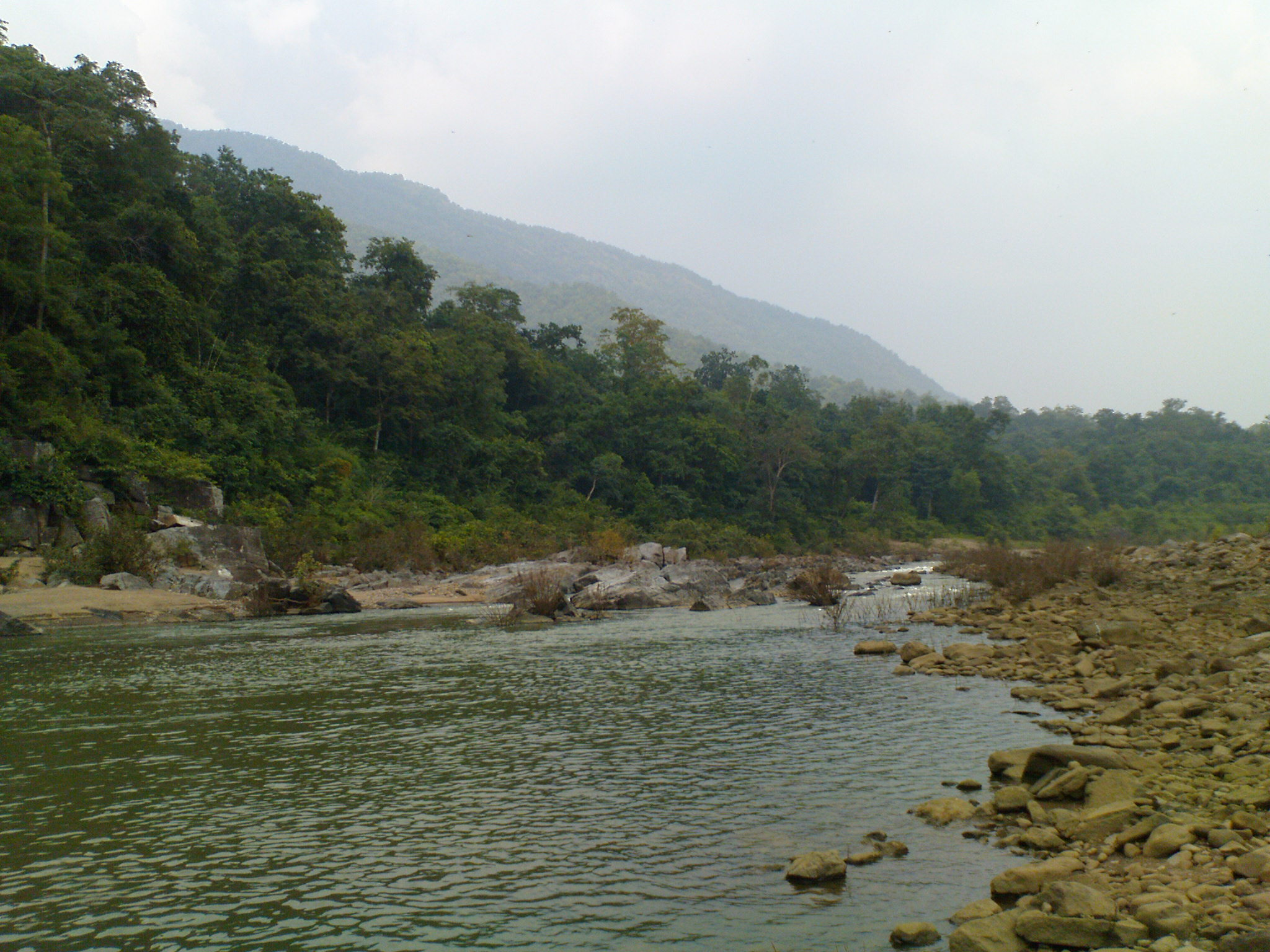
- Panchadhara Ghati, Athmallik Sub-Division

- Location in Odisha Athmallik (India)
- Coordinates: 20°43′11″N 84°31′48″E
- Country: India
- State: Odisha
- District: Angul
- Sub-Division: Athmallik

Area
  - Total: 1,890 km^{2} (730 sq mi)
- Time zone: UTC+05:30 (IST)
- PIN: 759125
- Telephone code: 06763
- Nearest city: Boudh, Angul, Sambalpur, Sonepur
- Avg. summer temperature: 48 °C (118 °F)
- Avg. winter temperature: 08 °C (46 °F)

Main gate of Maa Binikeyee Peetha, Athmallik.

Athmallik is a sub-division and its headquarter in Angul district in Odisha, India, and also a notified area council. It previously came under Dhenkanal district but after the creation of Angul district in April 1993 it then came under Angul. The Athmallik sub-division of Angul district includes Athmallik and Kishorenagar blocks and tehsils.

== History ==
Athmallik was initially an estate (jagir) which was recognized as a princely state in 1874. Athmallik was one of the 26 feudatory states of Odisha. Kaintragarh was the capital of Athmallik State, being carved out of the erstwhile Baudh ex-feudatory state.

In the 11th century, the princely state, established by King Pratap Deo, a scion of the Kadamba Dynasty. Pratap Deo was said to have found a Honda (Metal Vessel) which was considered to be lucky enough, after which the territory was then named as "Hondpa". In the course of time, one of the chiefs divided the ex-state into eight divisions and placed one sub-chief called "Malla" in each division with a view of suppressing the unruly tribes; on this basis the kingdom changed its name from "Hondpa" to "Athmallik".

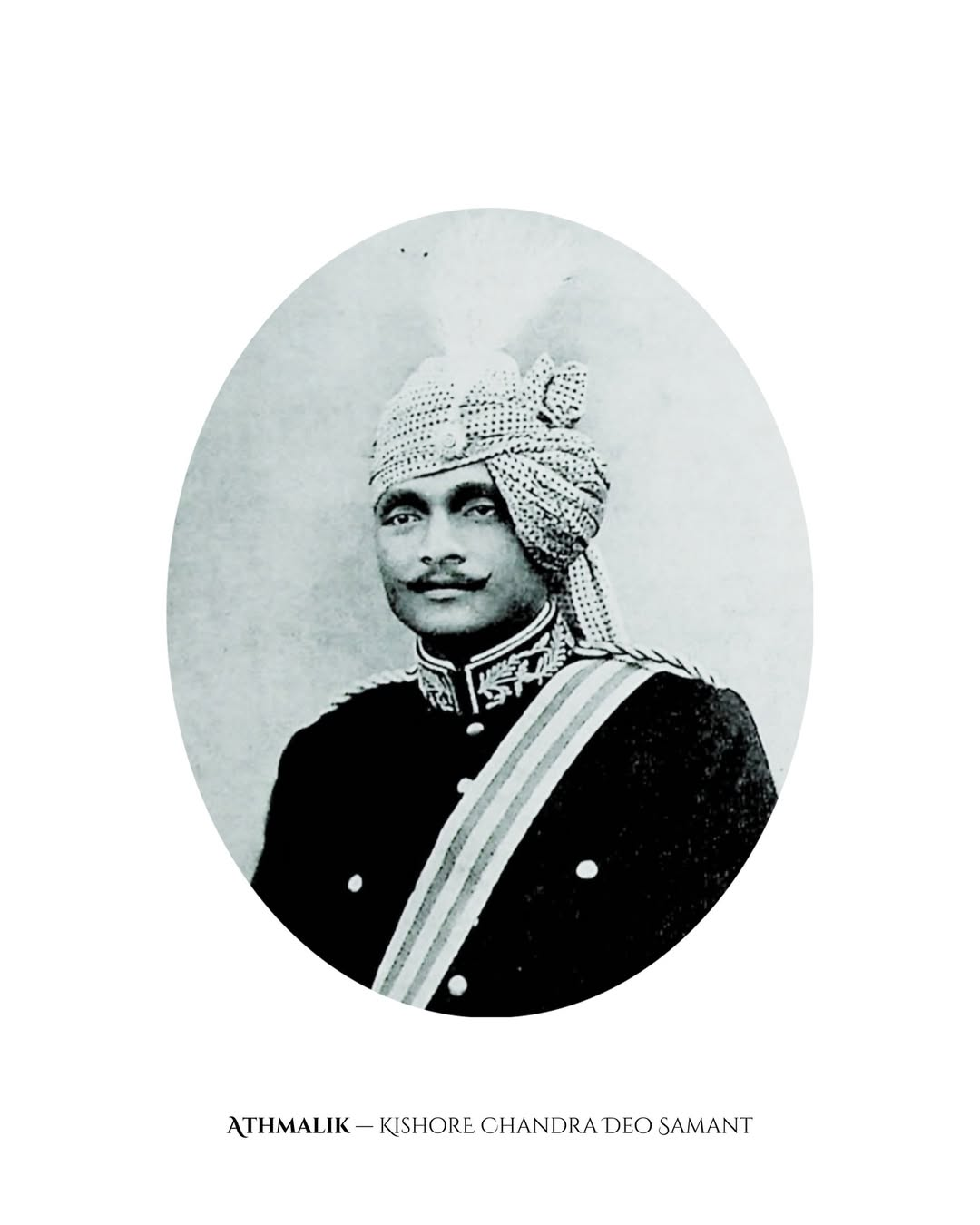
Raja Kishore Chandra Deo Samant was the last king of Athmallik State, India

One of the most prominent Zamindari includes Zamindari of Aida-Kalamati held by the House of Mishras-Sambalpur since the 1870s. The Zamindari was granted by the Raja of Athmallik state to be an independent functioning administrative Zamindari and thus they were allowed to use His Highness title informally along the Rajas. The state merged with Dhenknal from the rule of Kishore Chandra Deo in 1948 and remained under Dhenkanal District until 31 March 1993. Due to bifurcation of the District Athmallik, a Sub-Division, is now under Angul District, as from 1993.

=== Rajas ===
Rajas of the princely states are as follows:

- Jogendra Samant (1874–1877)
- Mahendra Deo Samant (4 February 1877 - 1900)
- Bibhendra Deo Samant (1900 - 3 November 1918)
- Kishore Chandra Deo Samant (born 1904) (3 November 1918 – 15 August 1947)
- Raja Surajmani Deo Samant (born 1995)

== Geography ==
The Panchadhara hills, on the northern side of Athmallik acts as a physical barrier for natural disasters such as floods and storms. The length of the Panchdhar Range is around 100 km and its height is around 400 meters and its width is around 5 km.

The mountain range separates Athmallik city from Thakurgarh and Boinda and provides a shelter for wild animals like elephants, leopards, bears, wolves, deer, wild goats, wild boars and various types of birds.

The Mahanadi River passes through Athmallik sub-division. The Mahanadi, which floods every year, is known as the "Tragedy of Athmallik". The river separates the Angul and Boudh districts. I is the only natural source of water for the people of Athmallik.

There are only two tributaries near Athmallik. One is Malipadar Canal which provides the larger portion of water to Mahanadi from Athmallik region, another is the Liploi canal - which is a small canal.

== Demographics ==
As of 2001 India census, Athmallik had a population of 11,383. Males constitute 52% of the population and females 48%. Athmallik has an average literacy rate of 65%, higher than the national average of 59.5%; with 59% of the males and 41% of females literate. 13% of the population is under 6 years of age.

== Culture and Festivals ==
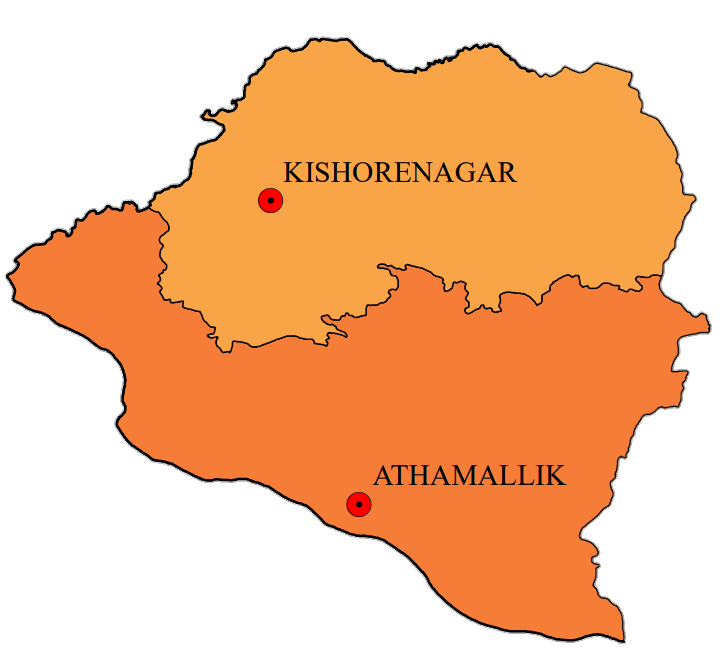
Map of Athmallik Sub Division, Odisha

Due to the geography of the region bordering the western odisha, the language and culture of Athmallik sub-division is largely influenced by the western Odisha culture or Sambalpuri culture. The local language of Athmallik Sub-division is called as Athmallikia which closely related to sambalpuri. many festivals which are celebrated in Western Odisha like Pushpuni, Bhai Jiuntia, Pua Jiuntia, Sitalsasthi, Karma Parba festivals are celebrated in Athmallik sub-division.The biggest festival of Western Odisha, Nuakhai, is also celebrated in Athmallik Sub Division.

The Danda Nrutya is oldest folk festival of Athmallik. It is a century old tradition dedicated to lord Shiva and goddess Kali followed since when Athmallik is existed. It is observed in all over the Athmallik Sub-Division.It is celebrated in summer season or in Odia month Chaitra of every year. It is a public festival of Athmallik.

The Goddess Maa Maheswari is the Presiding Deity of Athmallik Sub Division.Maa Maheswari is worshiped in the region since the Kadamba Dynasty is established the Athmallik State. Rath Yatra festival also is the most celebrated public festival of Athmallik.

== Notable people ==
Athmallik Sub-division is the birthplace of Swedish artist P. K. Mahanandia. Mahanndia painted a portrait of Indira Gandhi before he rode by bicycle to Sweden to reunite with his Swedish wife, Charlotte "Lotta" von Schedvin.

== Access ==
Athmallik is located 235 kilometres (146 mi) from Bhubaneswar, 200 kilometres (120 mi) from Cuttack and 160 kilometres (99 mi) from Sambalpur and is well connected by road. National Highway 55 passes through it. The nearest railway station is at Boinda 36 kilometres (22 mi) away and Bamur is 43 kilometres (27 mi) away. The nearest airports are Veer Surendra Sai Airport and Biju Patnaik Airport.

== Accommodation ==
A circuit house (reservation authority is sub-collector, Athmallik), an inspection bungalow of public works department (reservation authority is executive engineer, R & B, Dhenkanal), a guest house of Manjore Irrigation Project (reservation authority Executive Engineer) and a dharmasala managed by NAC provide accommodation facilities to the tourists. However the comfort loving travellers are advised to stay at Angul and cover the shrine in a day by hiring a vehicle.

== Education ==
Athmallik has several educational institutions. It houses many Odia, Hindi, and English-medium schools. Athamallik College (junior and degree) is the key centre for education in this area.
