= NALCO =

NALCO may refer to:

- National Aluminium Company - India's Govt sector Aluminium manufacturer
- Nalco Holding Company - formerly known as Nalco Chemical Company
- Nalconagar, Angul - a town in Angul District, Orissa, India
- Ondeo Nalco - purchased by the Blackstone Group in 2003
- North American Lamp Company - Manufacturers of carbon filament light bulbs until 1973.
- Nationalistic Communist - Political current in Eastern Europe in 1990s.
