= Kishorenagar =

Kishorenagar Rajkishorenagar
- Block and Tahasil Headquarters
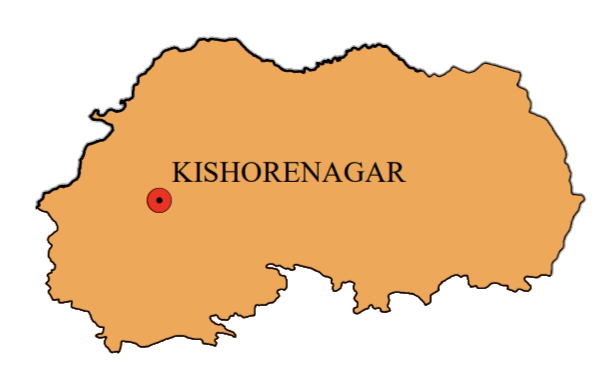

- Location In Odisha, India Kishorenagar (India)
- Coordinates: 20.952281°N 84.470604°E
- country: India
- State: Odisha
- District: Angul
- Named after: Raja Kishore Chandra Deo Samant

Area
  - Total: 975.7 km^{2} (376.7 sq mi)
- Elevation: 155 m (509 ft)

Population (2020)
  - Total: 131,740

Languages
  - Official: Odia, English
- Time zone: UTC+5:30 (IST)
- Pin: 759126(Raj Kishoreagar) 759127(Kishoreganj)
- Vehicle registration: OD-19(Angul) OD-27(Boudh) Nearest RTO OD-15(Sambalpur) Nearest RTO
- Nearest Towns: Angul, Rairakhol, Athmallik, Sambalpur, Boudh
- Literacy: 79.21%
- Website: odisha.gov.in

Kishorenagar is a small Town in the Angul district, Odisha, India. It is also called as Raj Kishorenagar. It is a Block and Tahasil under Athmallik Sub-Division. It was 90 km from District Headquarter Angul and 40 km from Sub-divisional Headquarter Athmallik.

== History ==
The present sub-division of Athmallik was a part of the ex-state of Baudh until 18th century where the region was called as Domgarh a Dom tribe king was ruled under him. The history of princely states reveals that the royal dynasty of Athmallik evolved from 'Kadamba Dynasty'. This Kadamba Dynasty is symbolised with a Kadamba flower upon which an umbrella and two swords are embedded. The presiding deity of this Dynasty and region is “Maa Maheswari". It is told that in 11th Century AD Pratap Deo, a prince from Jaipur Royal Dynasty came to visit Jaganath temple in puri and later occupied Domgarh after defeating a Dom Tribe King and established this State named Hondpa (Handapa) and declared himself as the King of the Area.

Raja Kishore Chandra Deo Samant was the Last King of his dynasty. He devoted himself to the task of bringing all round development to the state. He had brought about many administrative and taxation reforms, the whole state being administered in 4 praganas and two sub-divisions namely Athmallik sadar and Kishorenagar. According to his name a region from the Athmallik State, he named as Kishorenagar and declared as 2nd capital of the state

Athmallik State was merged with Dhenkanal from the rule of Kishore Chandra Deo Samant after independence in 1948. Later the Athmallik State was made as a sub-division under Dhenkanal district and Kishorenagar was made a block within the Athmallik sub-division for better governance. This Block started functioning as a preextension stage from 01.10.1958 and turned into stage-I phase from October 1959 and stage-II phase from October 1965. Now it is functioning as stage-III Block since October 1970. It remained under Dhenkanal District until 31 March 1993. After bifurcation of the District Kishorenagar Block remained in Athmallik sub-division under Angul District and continuing as such.

== Administrative division ==
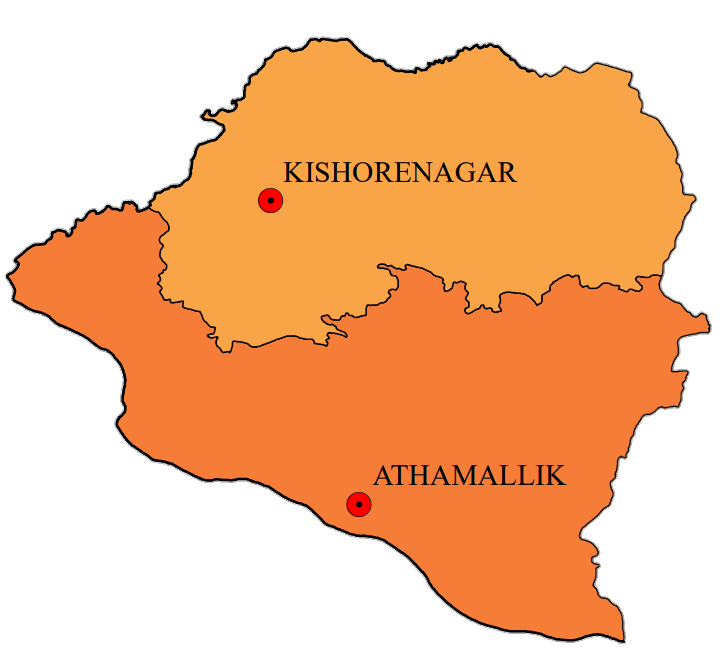
Map of Athmallik Sub Division, Odisha

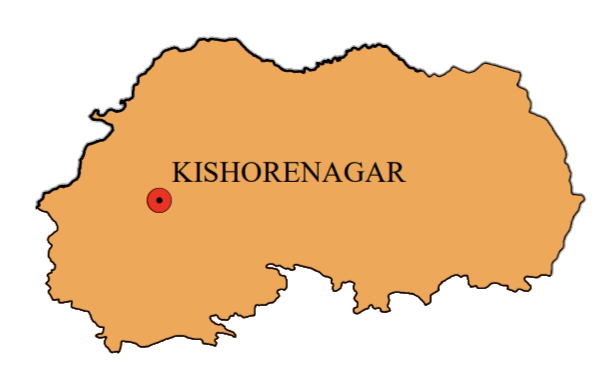
Kishorenagar Block, Odisha

The total Gram Panchayats of Kishorenagar block is 23 and RI circle is 08 covering 231 revenue villages. 2 Police Station, 1 Community Health Center, 3 Primary Health Center, 1 Fire Station and several govt banks and office headquarters.

== Location ==
The neighboring district is Sambalpur and the neighboring Block Athmallik, Rairakhol, Chhendipada and Angul. This Block covers 40 kms of NH-55 and 38 kms of East Coast Railway.

The head quarters of Kishorenagar Block is 6 kms far from Bamur Bus Stop and Bamur railway station. the distance of the block HQ is 90 kms from District HQ Angul and 40 kms from Sub-Divisional HQ Athmallik.

== Education ==
Kishorenagar has several educational institutions. It houses many Odia and English-medium schools. Some important institutions are:

- Kishorenagar Higher Secondary School
- Kishorenagar Degree College
- Govt High School, Kishorenagar
- Govt Elementary Teacher Education Institute, Kishorenagar
- Anchalik Higher Secondary School, Angapada
- Janata Higher Secondary School, Boinda
- Janata Degree College, Boinda
- Sai Prabhujee Global School
- Ramakrushna Educational institution
- Saraswati Sisu Vidya Mandir
- Saraswati International School
- Odisha Adarsha Vidyalaya
- K.B. Hist College
- Nice Institute
