= Baragounia =

- Village
- Pandurushuni Temple, Baragounia, Angul
- Nickname: Mystic Village
- Location in Odisha, Banatla India Baragounia (India)
- Coordinates: 20°42′17″N 85°04′9″E
- Country: India
- State: Odisha
- District: Angul
- Established: March,1993

Government
  - Collector & District Magistrate: Shri Siddharth Shankar Swain, IAS

Population (2011)
  - Total: 2,310

Languages
  - Official: Oriya
- Time zone: UTC+5:30 (IST)
- PIN: 759129
- Telephone code: 06764
- Vehicle registration: OD-19
- Nearest city: Cuttack, Bhubaneswar
- Sex ratio: 893 female per 1000 male ♂/♀
- Literacy: 68%
- Lok Sabha constituency: Angul
- Climate: according to weather (Köppen)
- Avg. summer temperature: 47 °C (117 °F)
- Avg. winter temperature: 10 °C (50 °F)
- Website: www.mihelpu.com

Baragounia is a small village located in Bantala Tehsil of Angul district, Odisha, India, with a population of 2,310.

== Geography ==
Baragounia is located at 20.70°N 85.06°E. It has an average elevation of 195 m (640 ft) above sea level. The total geographical area of the district is 2 km2. From the location point of view of area it is Bantala 12 km from Angul district. Baragounia consists of a total of four sahi/areas: Punapasi, Kimiridhara, Gothomala, Gna

== Climate ==
The climatic condition of Angul is varied. It has mainly 4 seasons. The summer season is from March to mid-June, the period from mid-June to September is the Rainy season, October and November constitute the post-monsoon season and winter is from December to February.

The average annual rainfall of the district is 1421 mm. However, there is a great variation of rainfall from year to year. The rainfall in the district during the last 10 years varied between 896 mm & 1744 mm. There are 70 rainy days on an average in a year, but it varies from 66 at Angul to 80 at Bantala. The distribution of rainfall is also quite erratic causing widespread drought year after year. 2013 was marked by Cyclone Phailin that caused extensive rainfall resulting to floods.

There is a meteorological observatory in the district. The data of this observatory may be taken as representative of the meteorological condition of the whole village. The hot season commences by beginning of March. May is the hottest month with a mean daily maximum temperature at 44 degree Celsius. With the onset of monsoon, early in June day temperature drops appreciably. After withdrawal of monsoon by the 1st week of October both day and night temperature began to diminish steadily. December is usually coldest month of a year with a mean daily minimum temperature of 11 degree Celsius. In association with the passage of western disturbances across north India during winter months short spells of cold occur and the minimum temperature drops down to 10 degree Celsius. The lowest minimum temperature was 5.2 degree Celsius in Baragounia and neighborhood are hottest part of the district and have lower rainfall. The summer temperature has shown as increasing trend in recent past.

Winds are generally light to moderate with some increase in force in the summer and southwest monsoon seasons. Winds usually blow from southwest and northwest directions in the monsoon. In the post monsoon and cold seasons winds blow between the west and north. In the summer months the winds become variable in direction.2013 cyclone Phailin rose wind speed gusts to 100kmph.

== Demographics ==
The Baragounia village has population of 2310 of which 1181 are males while 1129 are females as per Population Census 2011.

In Baragounia village population of children with age 0-6 is 282 which makes up 12.21% of total population of village. Average Sex Ratio of Baragounia village is 956 which is lower than Orissa state average of 979. Child Sex Ratio for the Baragounia as per census is 932, lower than Orissa average of 941.

Baragounia village has higher literacy rate compared to Orissa. In 2011, literacy rate of Baragounia village was 75.00% compared to 72.87% of Orissa. In Baragounia Male literacy stands at 85.41% while female literacy rate was 64.15%.

As per constitution of India and Panchyati Raaj Act, Baragounia village is administrated by Sarpanch (Head of Village) who is elected representative of village.

== Caste factor ==
Baragounia village of Anugul has substantial population of Schedule Caste. Schedule Caste (SC) constitutes 27.66% while Schedule Tribe (ST) were 1.00% of total population in Baragounia village.

== Work profile ==
In Baragounia village out of total population, 934 were engaged in work activities. 37.58% of workers describe their work as Main Work (Employment or Earning more than 6 Months) while 62.42% were involved in Marginal activity providing livelihood for less than 6 months. Of 934 workers engaged in Main Work, 145 were cultivators (owner or co-owner) while 126 were Agricultural labourer.

Particulars	Total	Male	Female
Total No. of Houses	550	NA	NA
Population	2,310	1,181	1,129
Child (0–6)	282	146	136
Schedule Caste	639	332	307
Schedule Tribe	23	11	12
Literacy	75.00 %	85.41 %	64.15%
Total Workers	934	678	256
Main Worker	351	0	0
Marginal Worker	583	0	0

== Villages mapped ==
Sr. No.	Census 2011 Village Code	Census Village Name
1	405215	Ramachandrapur
2	405226	Kaleipada
3	405227	Baragounia
4	405237	Magurakhala
5	405229	Sanahinso
6	405230	Badahinso

== Tourism ==
Maa Pandurushuni Thakurani, the temple of Pandurushuni Thakurani, is situated in opposite side hill which is in the best place of the Baragounia village. The Best Place is Pandurushuni Mundia where devotee come every year to pray to God. Bishnu temple which is situated top of the hill, two small stream (Bauli and kalapachal).

== Political Party ==
There are 3 party political party in this village.

1. Indian National Congress
2. Biju Janata Dal
3. Bharatiya Janata Party

== Education ==
Baragounia has a few schools of HSC, CBSE and ICSE Curriculum.

1. Baragounia G.P High School, Baragounia
2. Baragounia U.P School, Baragounia
3. Baragounia saraswati shishu mandir, Baragounia
4. Gothamalasahi primary school, Baragounia
5. Purunapasi project primary school, Baragounia
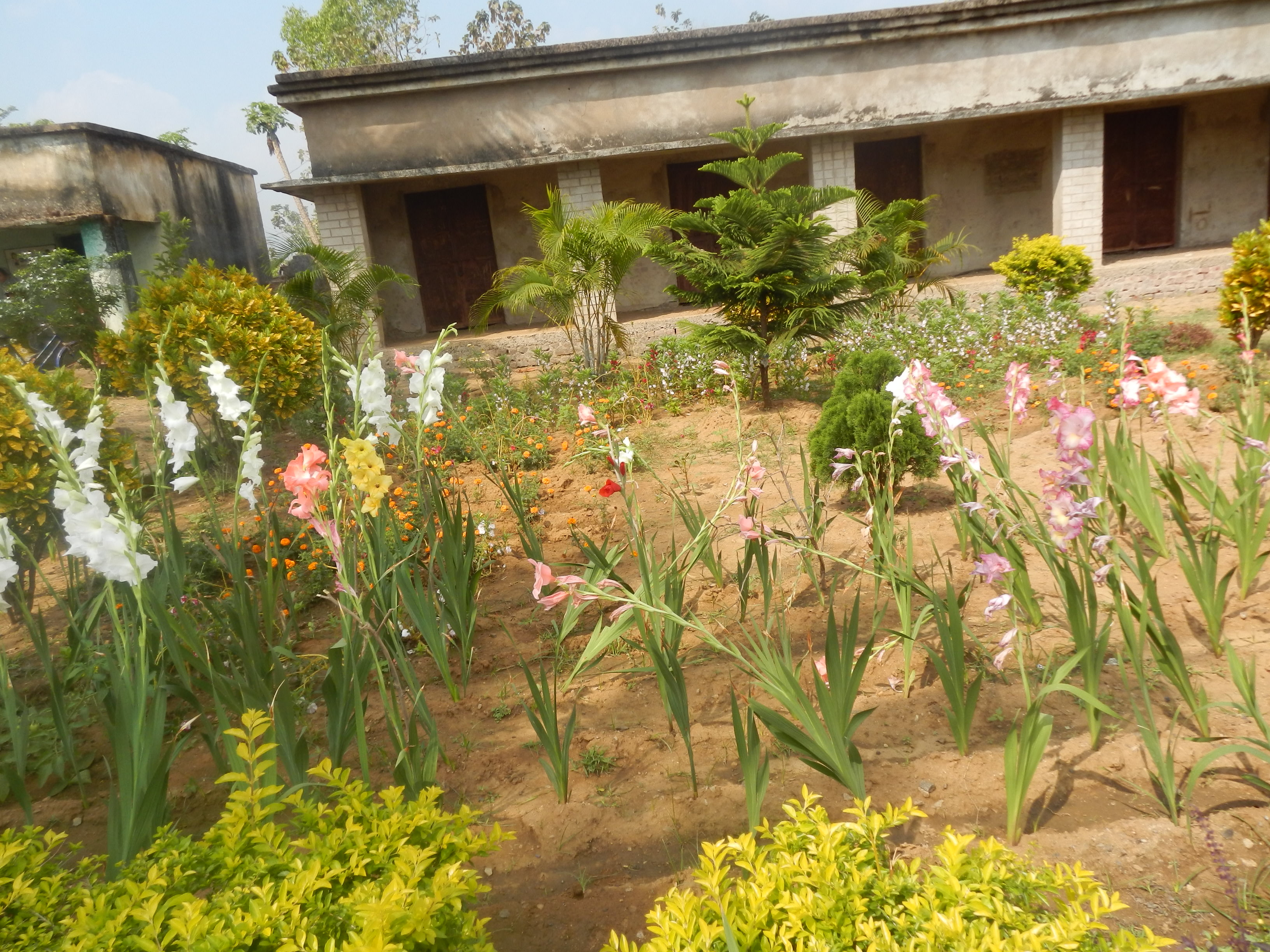
Primary school garden

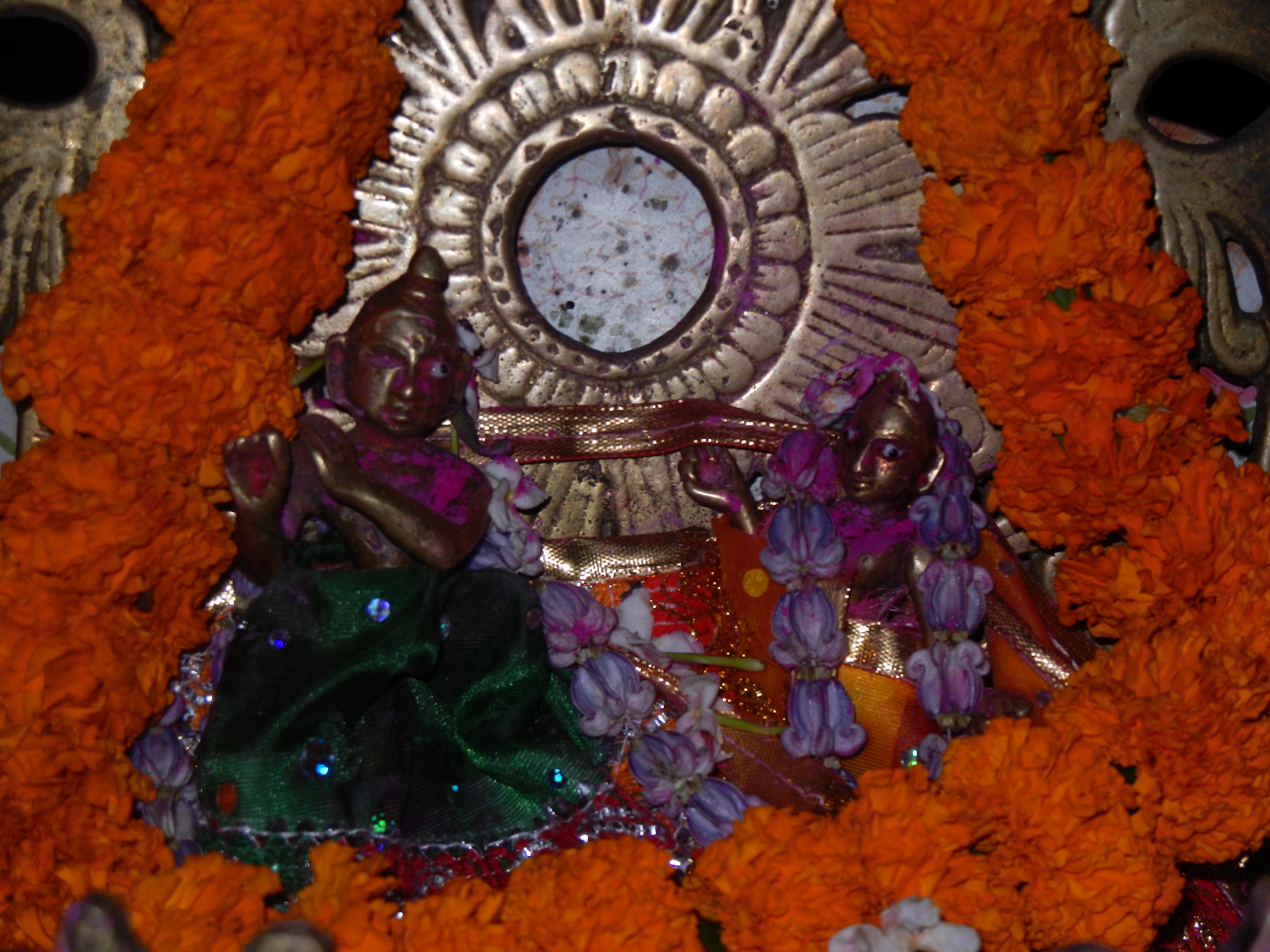
Lord radha Madhab

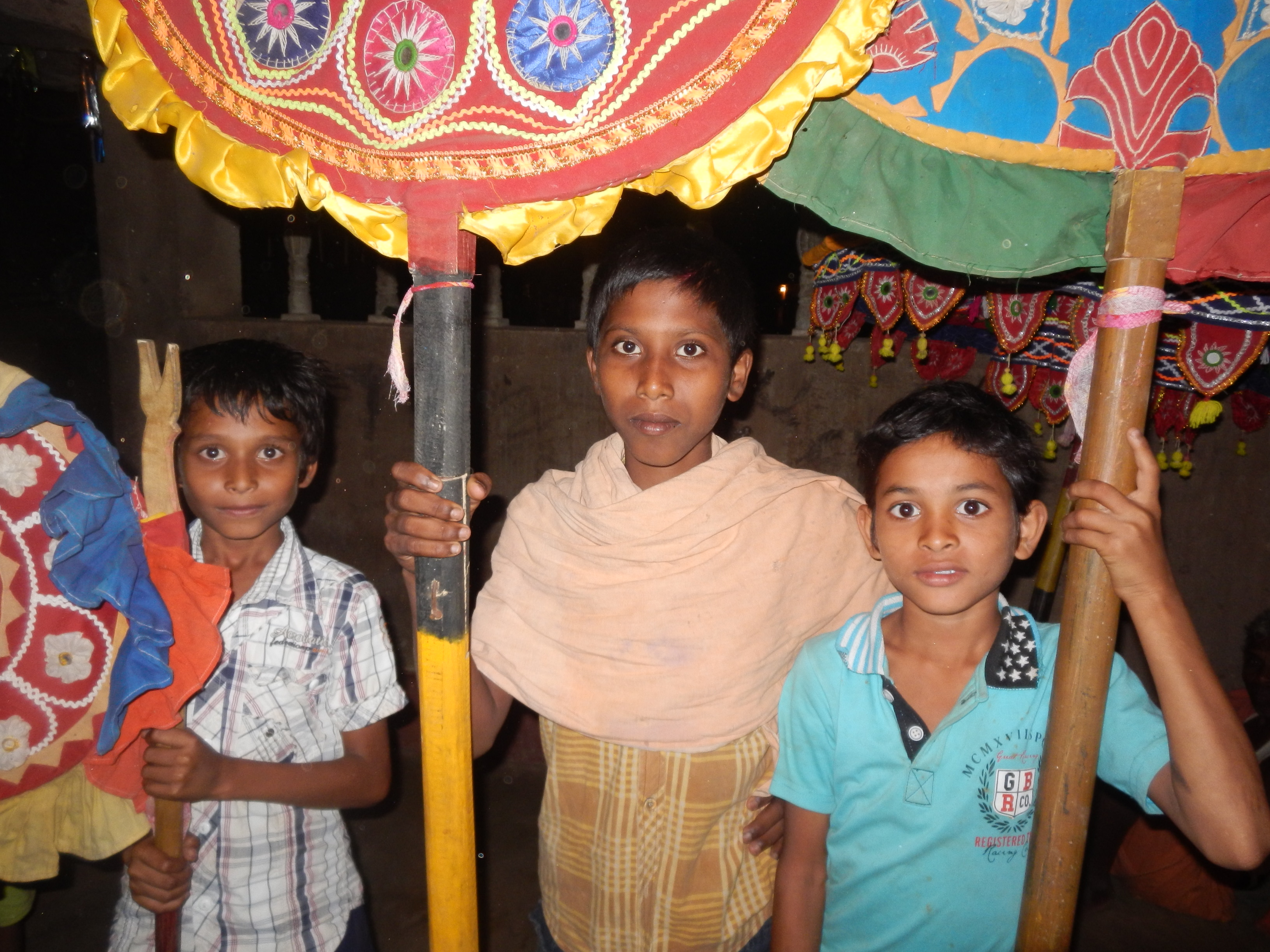
Children enjoying festival

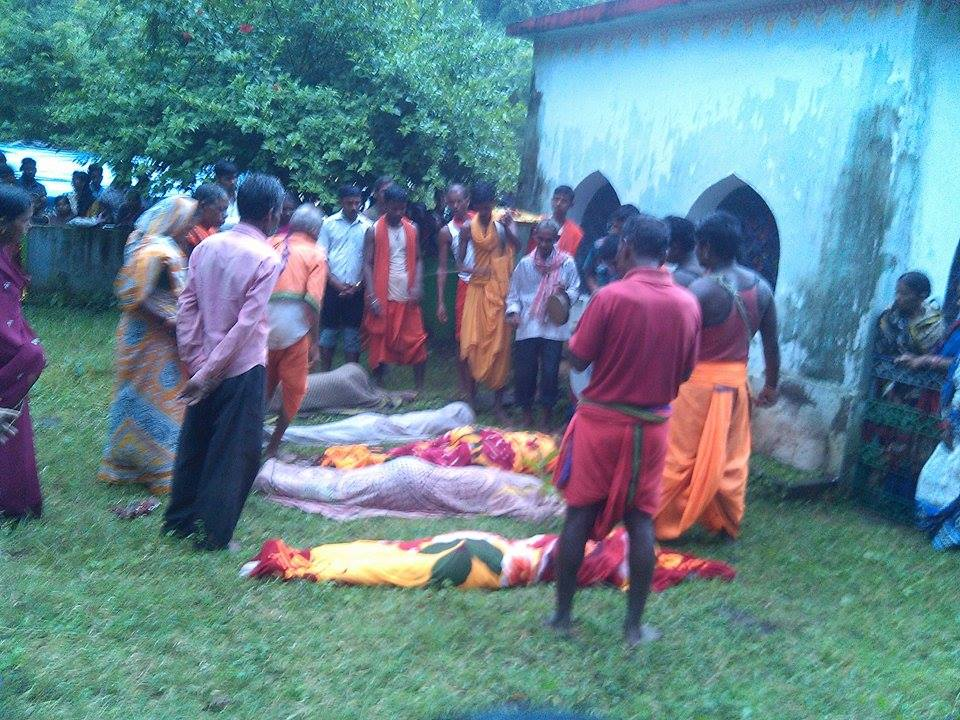
Devotee on MAA Pandurusuni

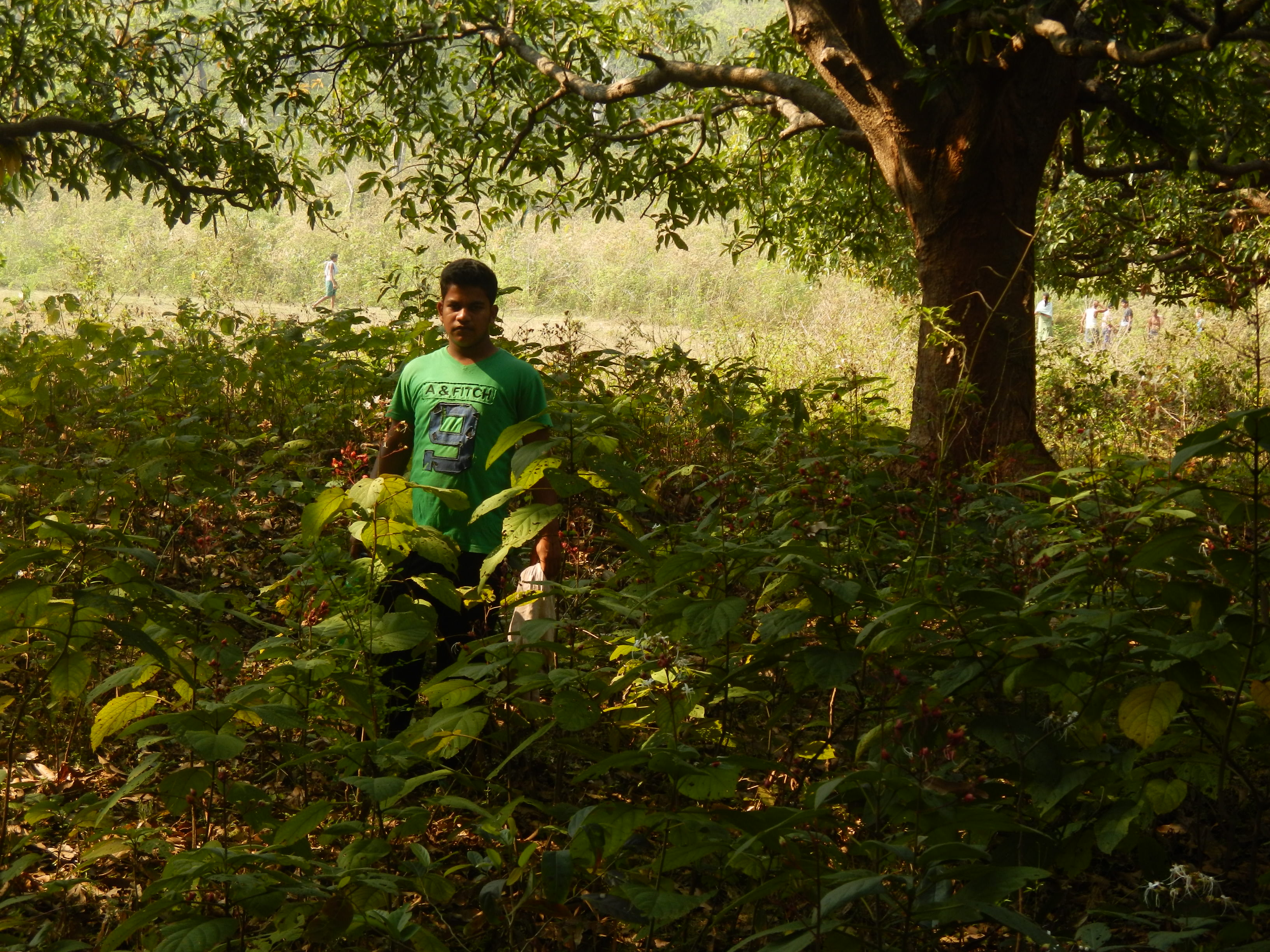
Student at village jungle

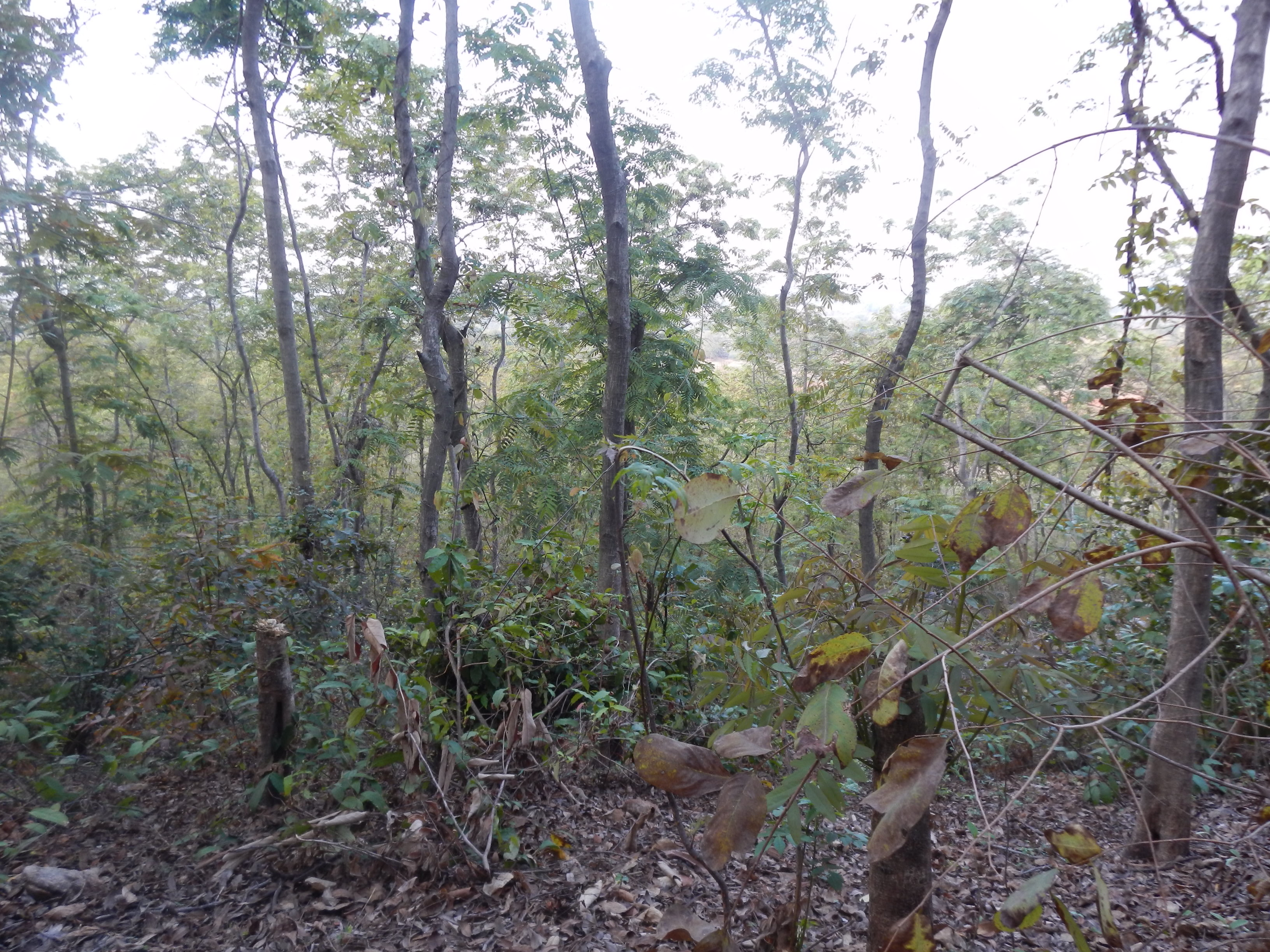
Jungle view

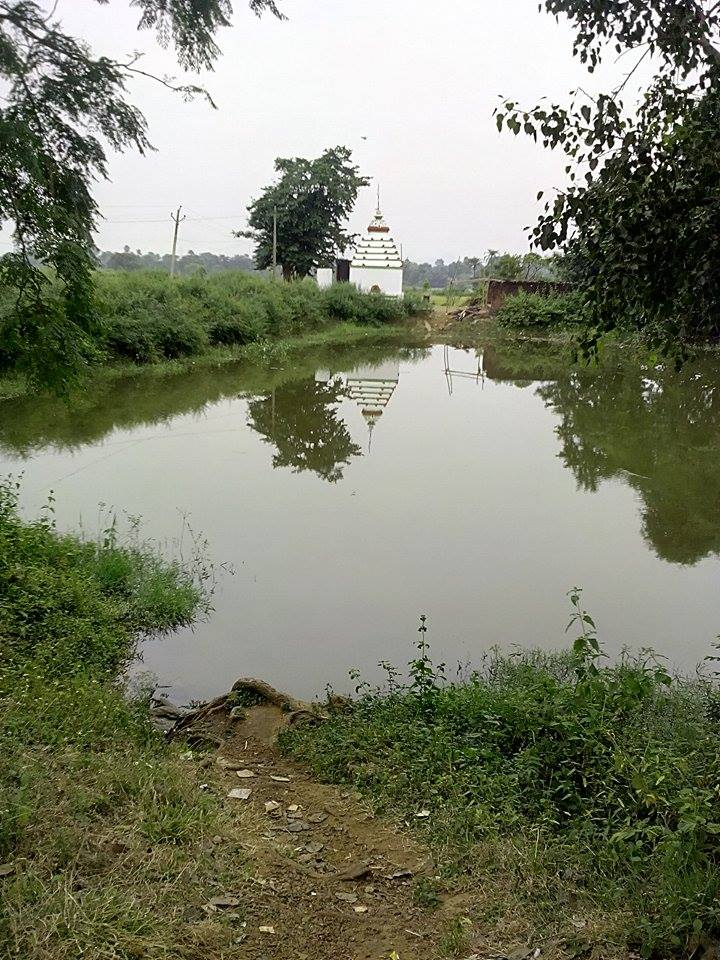
Scenery of Village

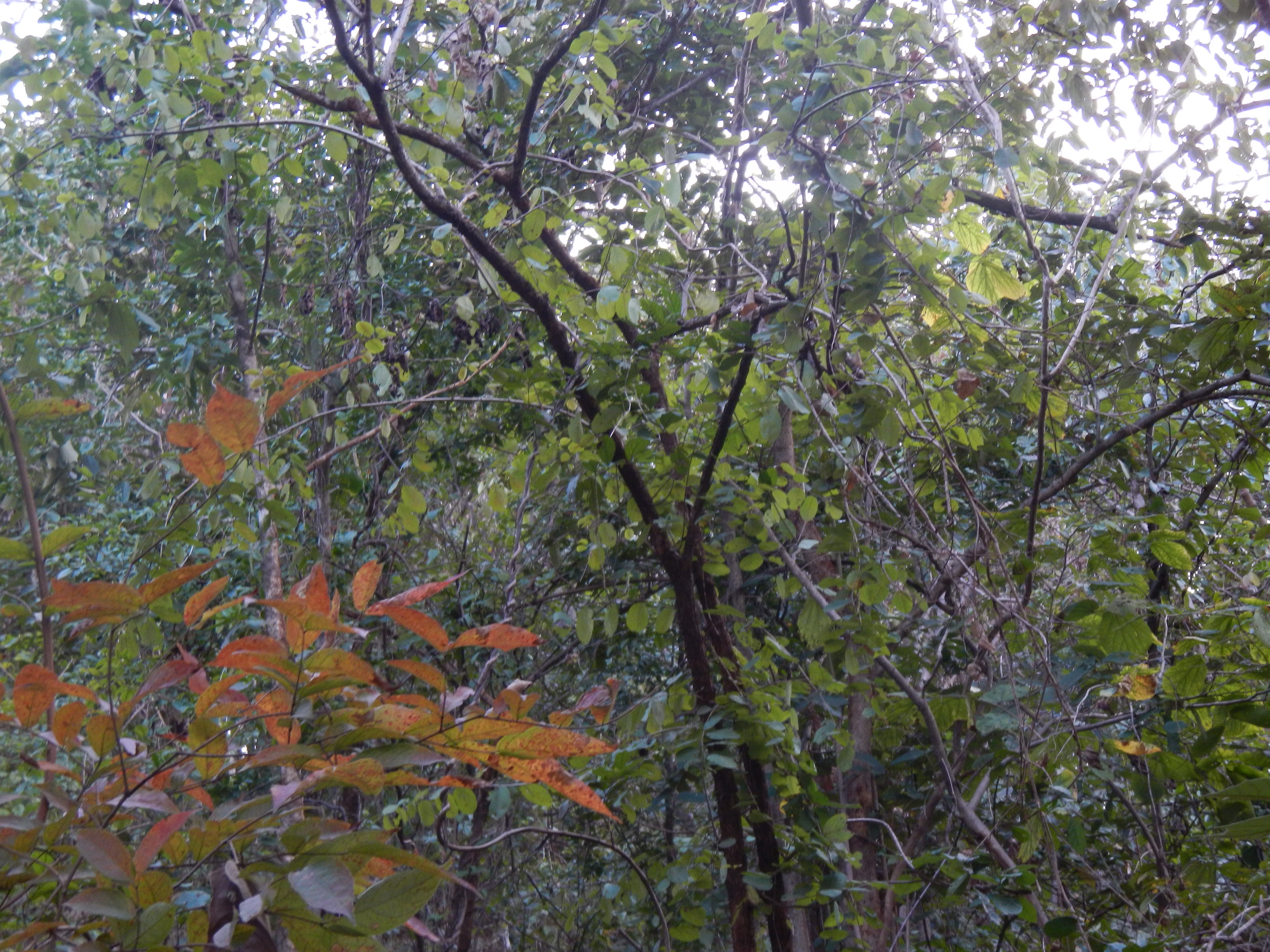
Student at Village Jungle

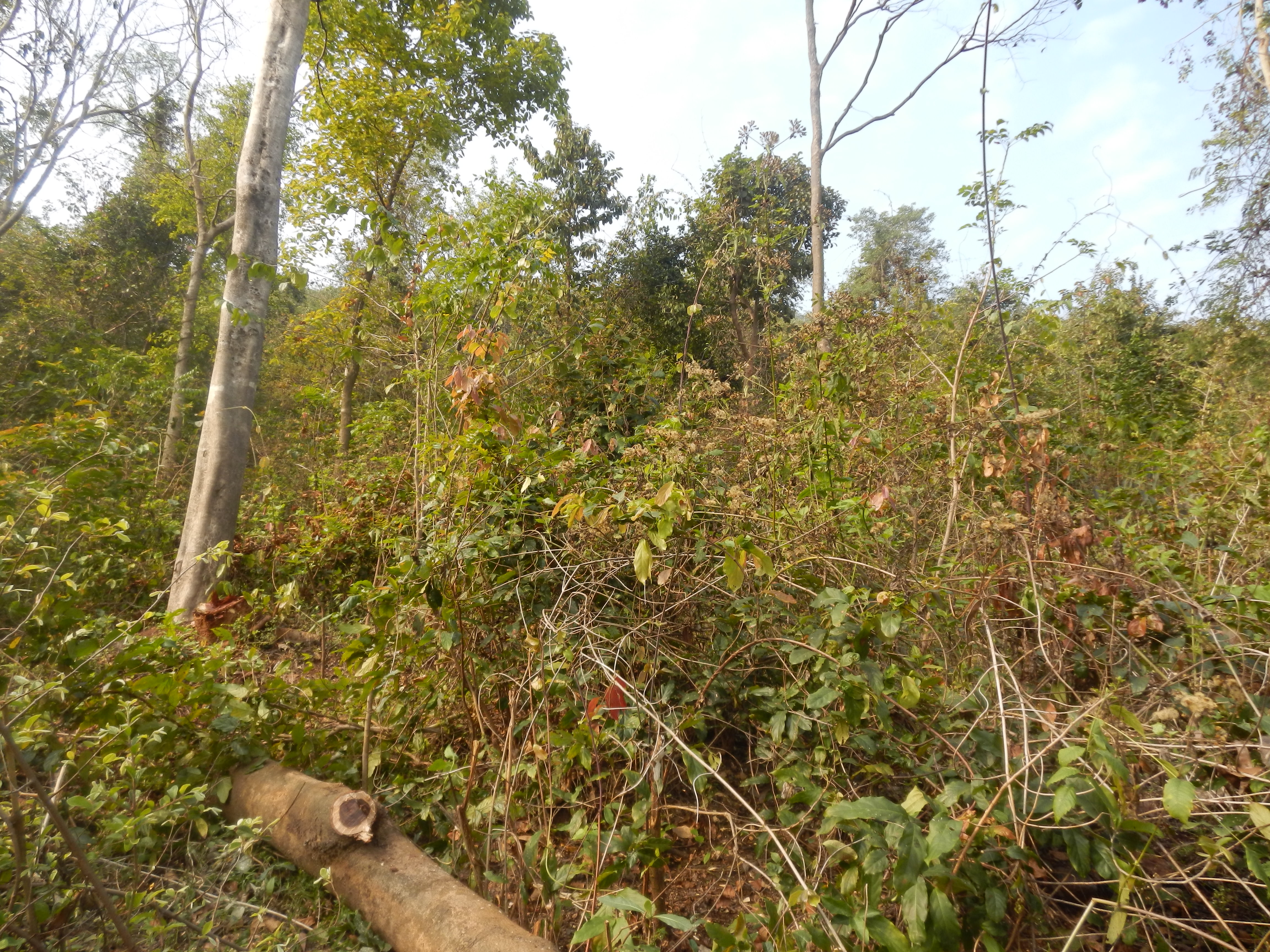
Jungle view

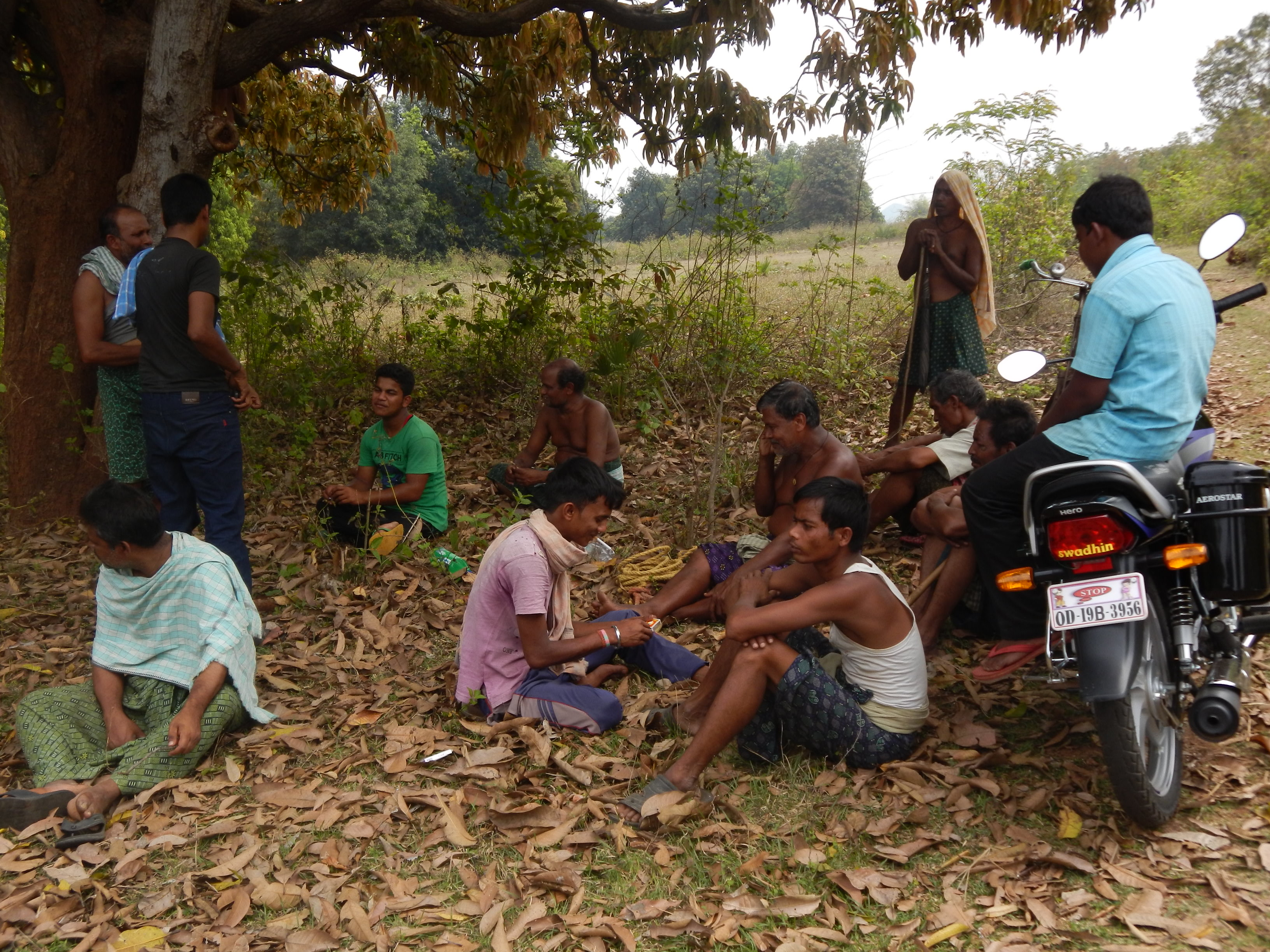
Jungle view

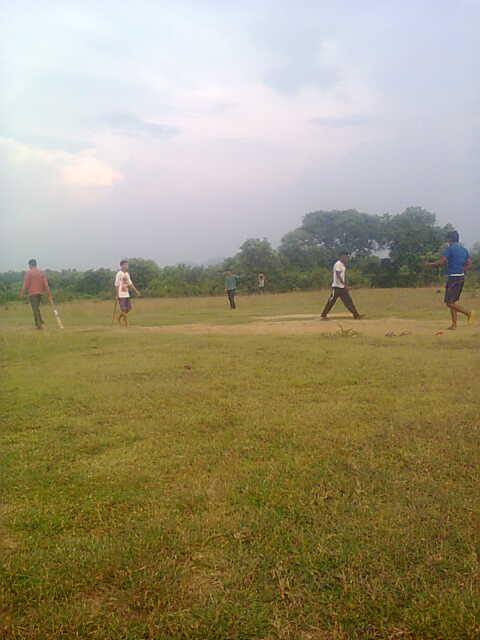
Cricket players

Snake Catcher
