= Boinda =

- Town
- Location in Odisha, India Boinda (India)
- Coordinates: 20°19′N 84°56′E
- Country: India

Languages
  - Official: Odia, English
- Time zone: IST
- PIN: 759127

Boinda is a small town in Angul district of Odisha, India. It is popularly known as Boinda Chhaka. It is situated along the national highway no 55 that connects Cuttack and Sambalpur. It's a station of the East Coast Railway line that connects Bhubaneswar and Sambalpur. Recently the state government tried to develop rail infrastructure in the state.

Boinda is also famous for Chandan Yatra (ଚନ୍ଦନ ଯାତ୍ରା) which is held in summer. This festival continues for five days. Many people outside Boinda do gather here with Boinda people. People enjoy many Swing Rides, melody dance all night.

Shiv Temple, Radha Krishna temple, Maa Tarini Temple are in Boinda too. With Kishoreganj Primary School, Ram Deo High School, Janata College, some private institutes children educate themselves.

Post Office - Kishoreganj, PIN - 759127
