= Angul steel plant =

Steel plant in India

The Angul steel plant is the largest steel plant in India and is under expansion. After the expansion, it will become the largest steel plant in the world.
