= Pratap Chandra Pradhan =

Indian politician

Member of Odisha Legislative Assembly
- Incumbent
- Assumed office 4 June 2024
- Preceded by: Rajani Kant Singh
- Constituency: Angul

Personal details
- Party: Bharatiya Janata Party
- Profession: Politician

Pratap Chandra Pradhan is an Indian politician. He was elected to the Odisha Legislative Assembly from Angul as a member of the Bharatiya Janata Party.
