= Nalconagar, Angul =

Nalconagar
- Town
- Nickname: Nalco
- Location in Odisha, India Nalconagar (India)
- Coordinates: 20.849°N 85.154°E
- Country: India
- State: Odisha
- District: Angul

Population (2001)
  - Total: 18,038

Languages
  - Official: Odia
- Time zone: UTC+5:30 (IST)
- PIN: 759145
- Vehicle registration: OD 19
- Website: odisha.gov.in

Nalconagar is a census town in Angul district in the Indian state of Odisha. Nalconagar, Angul is a suburb of Angul, Odisha.

== Demographics ==
As of 2001 India census, Nalconagar had a population of 18,038. Males constitute 53% of the population and females 47%. NALCO has an average literacy rate of 73%, higher than the national average of 59.5%. In NALCO, 14% of the population is under 6 years of age.

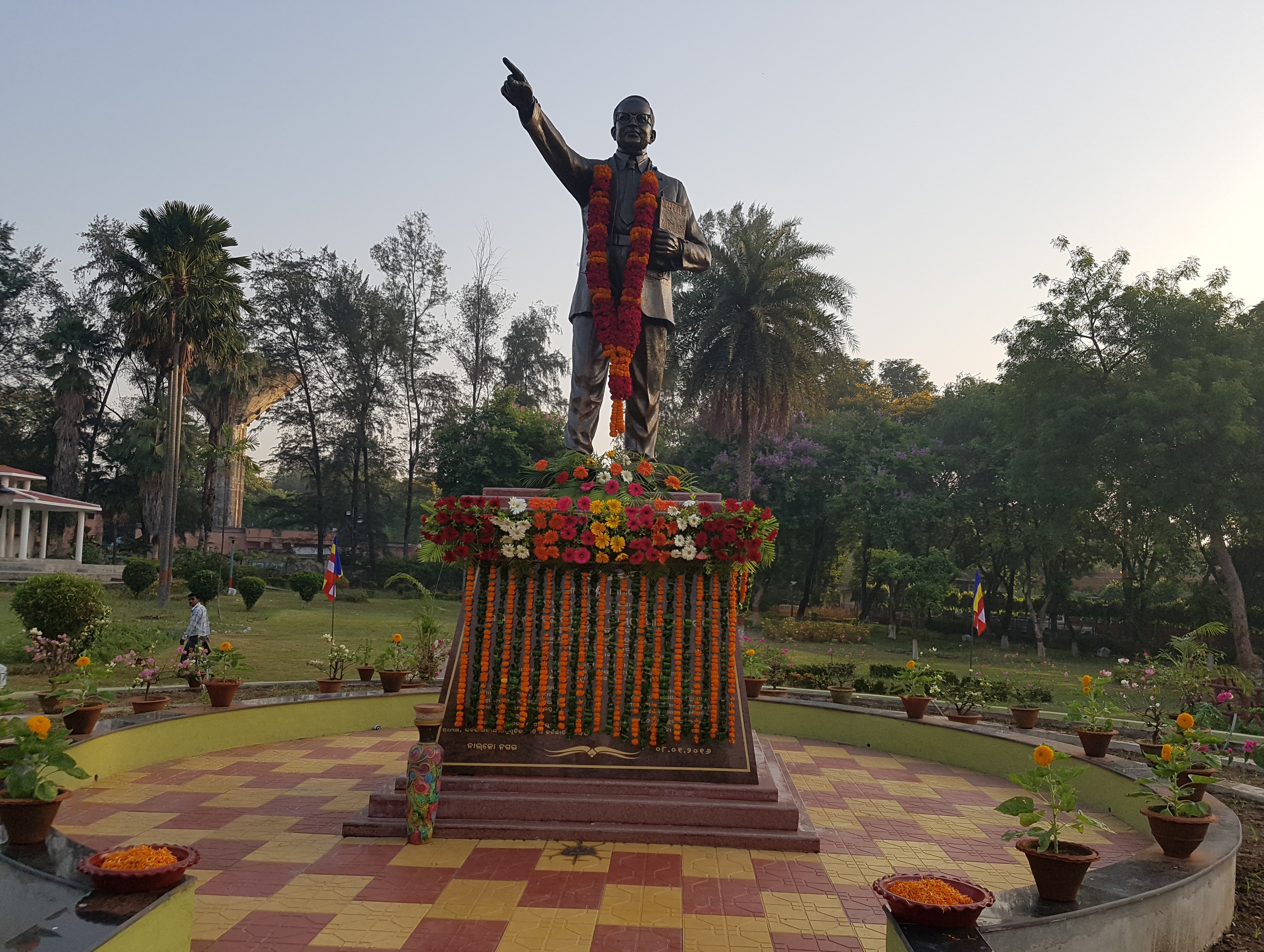
B R Ambedkar statue at B. R. Ambedkar Park

=== Design of quarters at Nalconagar ===
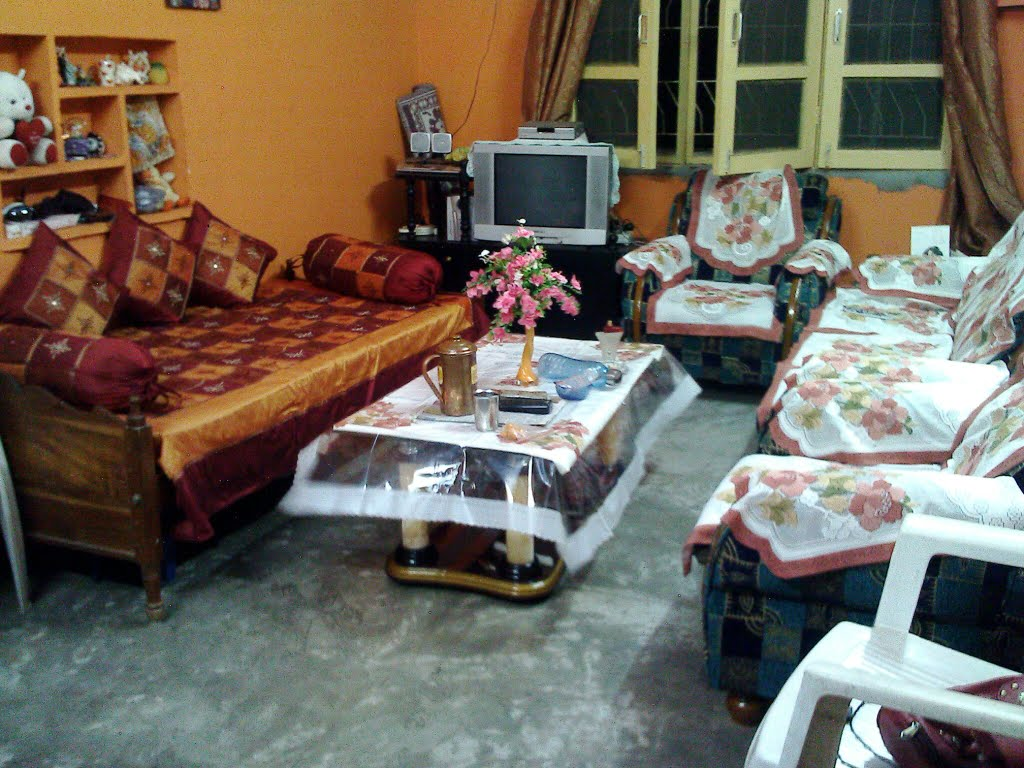
A view of a quarter house in Nalconagar

Nalconagar has quarters for NALCO's employees which is categorized into A block, B block, C block, and D block.

== Geography ==
Nalconagar is located at 20.849°N 85.154°E and 8 km from district headquarter, Angul.

== Health ==
Free health services is extended to all the employees of NALCO and their dependents through a 64-bedded hospital, also an OPD center present in Nalco nagar for peripheral people.

== Recreation ==
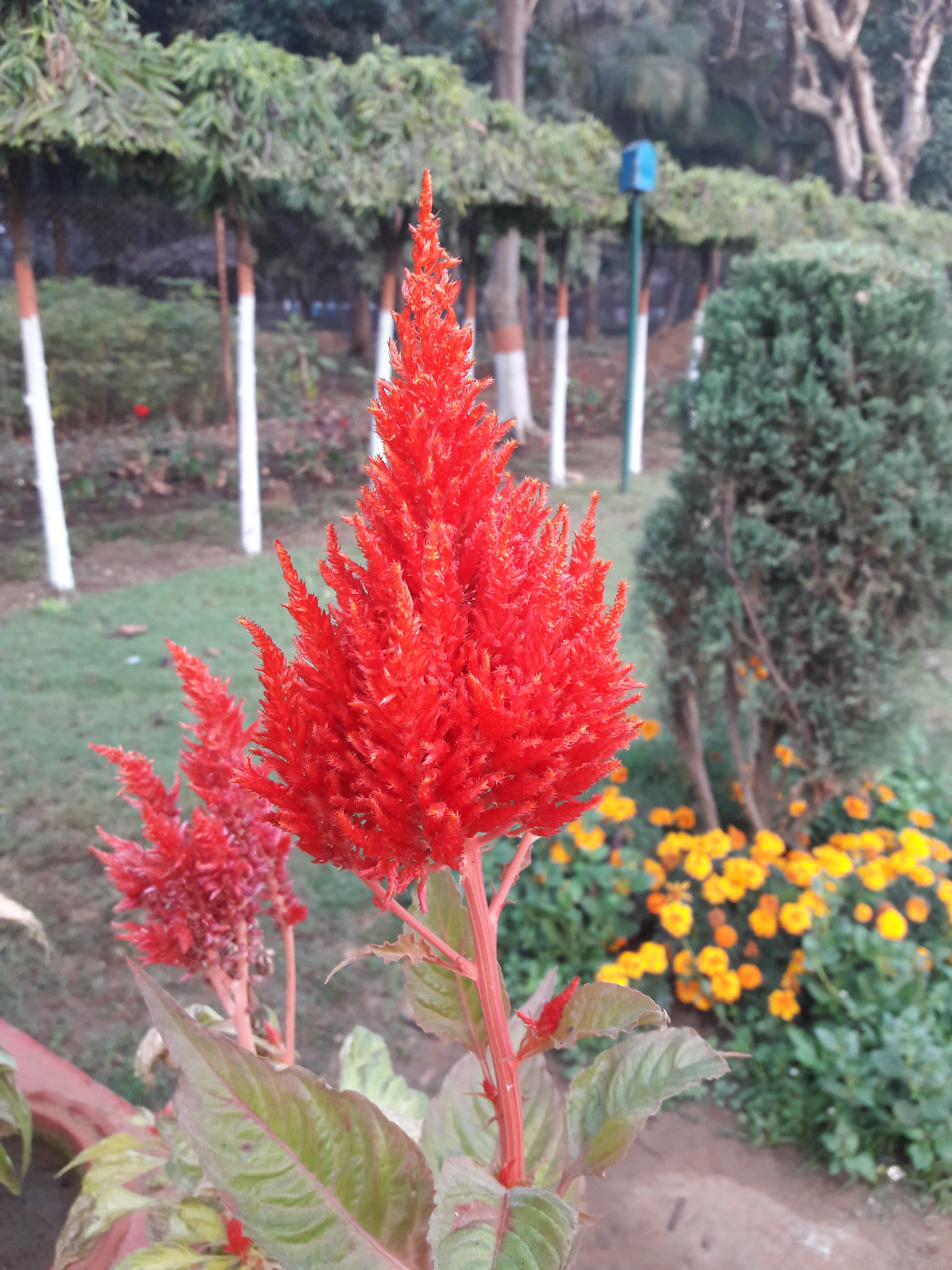
Flowers in B. R. Ambedkar Park, January 2017

Nalconagar has a few recreation parks: Dr. B. R. Ambedkar Park, Veer Birsa Munda Park, Gopabandhu Park, Madhusudan Park. A Musical Fountain in nalconagar can be seen in evening at Gopabandhu Park. Musical fountain is operative from 7.30 pm to 08.00 pm in evening. All these parks are maintained by Nalconagar township welfare committee.

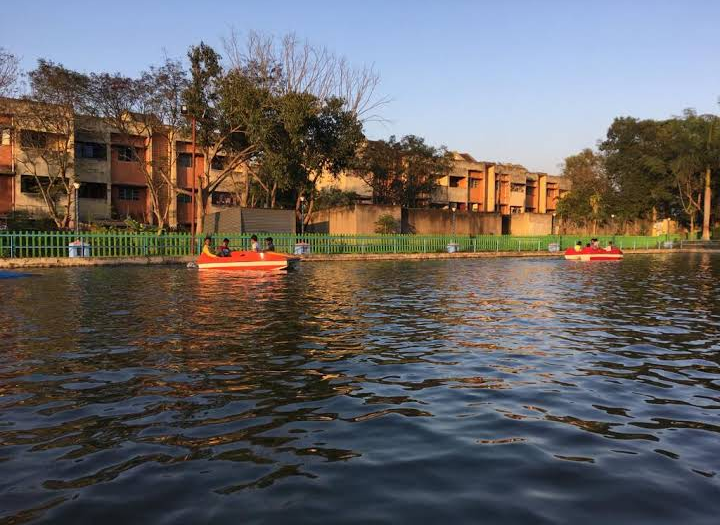
Boating Park, Nalconagar Angul

Other recreation center includes The Officer's Club and The club. The community center which hosts many cultural programs is one of the recreation centers,

== Sports ==
Biju Patnaik Sports Complex is situated at the center of the township. This sports complex is about 35 acres and includes one cricket stadium, one football stadium, one hockey stadium and two volleyball court.

== Education ==
Saraswati Vidya Mandir Nalco Nagar, Angul was established on 21 September 1984. This school was earlier known by the name of Chinmaya Vidyalaya. Academic process of this school managed by Sikshya Vikash Samiti, Bhubaneswar. It is recognized by the Govt. of Odisha and affiliated to Board of Secondary Education, Odisha, Cuttack and Council of Higher Secondary Education, Bhubaneswar. School offers education to students of LKG to those of +2 Arts & Science.

DPS Nalconagar established in 1984 and sponsored by National Aluminium Company affiliated to the Central Board of Secondary Education (CBSE) in New Delhi. The school lies in 30 acres (12 ha) of greenery with multi purpose hall, auditorium, library, laboratories and play fields and boasts of being only the third satellite school to be set up under the aegis of Delhi Public School Society.

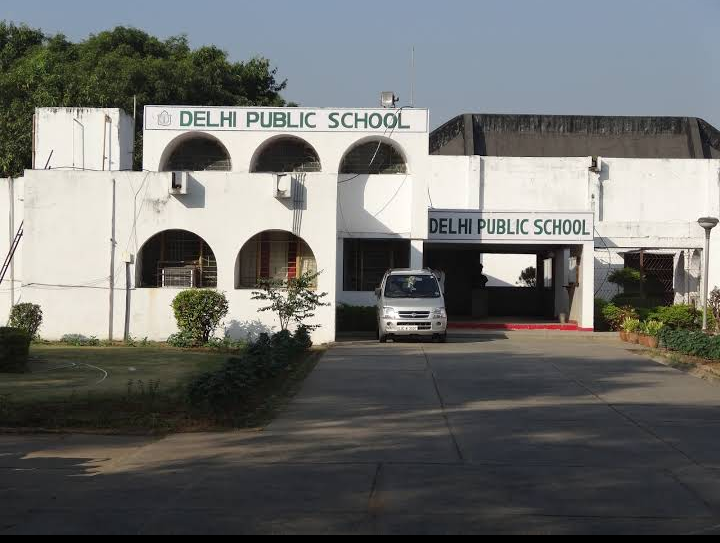

'Saint Sai Montessori Play School' is situated near Junior DPS runs inside The Club. This school has 28 years of excellence in Playgroup & Pre-nursery education. The Play School works on the philosophy of advancing the idea of 'learning with joy' with extracurricular activities.

== Transportation ==
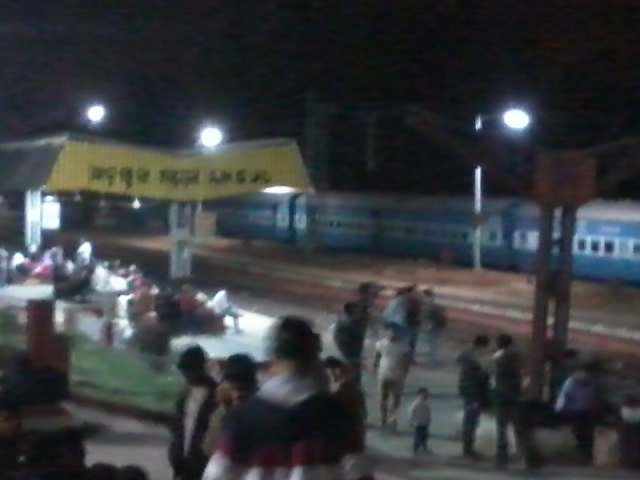
Angul railway station

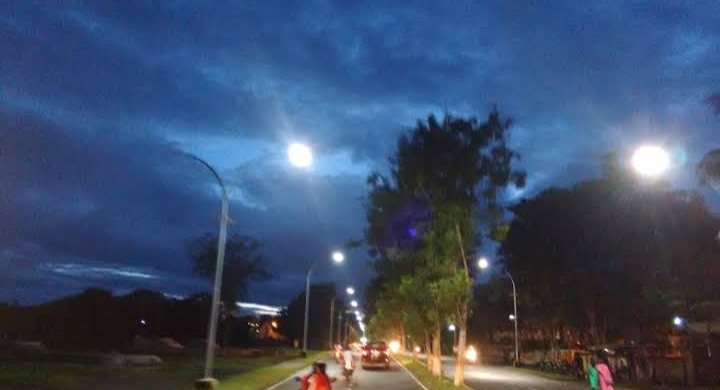
Street view, Nalconagar Angul

Nalconagar is well connected by roads (National Highway 55 (India) passes through it and rails. The nearest railway station to Nalconagar township is Angul railway station, which is 9 km away from the township. This place is directly connected by road and the nearest cities are:

- Cuttack, 107 km
- Bhubaneswar, 133 km
- Sambalpur, 168 km
- Rourkela, 214 km
