= Angul =

- City
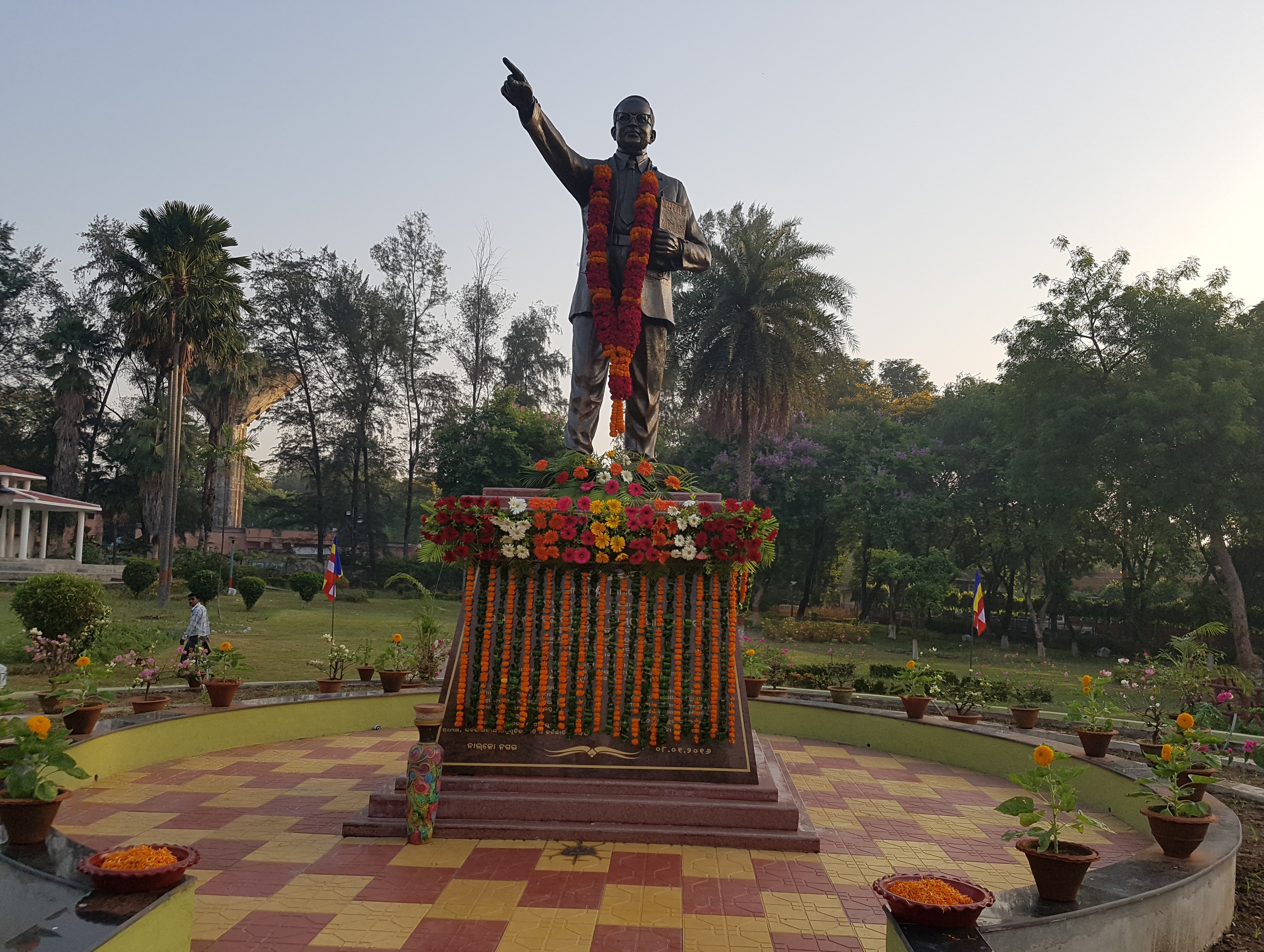
- Statue of B. R. Ambedkar in Nalconagar, Angul
- Nickname: Aluminium City Of Odisha
- Location in Odisha, India Angul (India)
- Coordinates: 20°50′17″N 85°05′44″E
- Country: India
- State: Odisha
- District: Angul
- Established: March,1993

Government
  - Collector & District Magistrate: Abdaal M. Akhtar, IAS

Population (2011)
  - Total: 44,390
- Demonym: Anugulia

Languages
  - Official: Odia
- Time zone: UTC+5:30 (IST)
- PIN: 759122
- Telephone code: 06764
- Vehicle registration: OD-19
- UN/LOCODE: IN ANO
- Nearest city(s): Kataka, Sambalpur, Debagarh, Bhubaneswar, Talcher
- Sex ratio: 893 female per 1000 male ♂/♀
- Literacy: 68%
- Lok Sabha constituency: Dhenkanal
- Climate: according to weather (Köppen)
- Avg. summer temperature: 30 °C (86 °F)
- Avg. winter temperature: 10 °C (50 °F)

Angul, offically renamed as Anugola, is a city, municipality and the headquarters of Angul district in the state of Odisha, India. Angul has an average elevation of 195 m (640 ft) above sea level and total area of 6232 km^{2}. It is the site of the Angul steel plant, .

== Geography ==
Angul is located at 21.21°N 86.11°E. It has an average elevation of 195 m (640 ft) above sea level. The total geographical area of the district is 6232 km^{2}. It terms of area, it stands 11th among the 30 Districts of Odisha.

== Demographics ==
As of the 2011 Census of India, Angul had a population of 44,390. Males constitute 55% of the population and females 45%. Angul has an average literacy rate of 77.53%, higher than the national average of 74.04%; with 58% of the males and 42% of females literate. About 11% of the population is under 6 years of age.

== Politics ==
A municipality is an urban local self-government organisation responsible for meeting local needs through local resources and the active participation of local people and their representatives. Angul Municipal Council is the urban local self-government body responsible for administering Angul. The local body was first constituted as a Notified Area Committee on 7 November 1931 under the Bihar and Orissa Municipality Act, 1922. Following the enforcement of the Orissa Municipality Act, 1950, it was converted into a Notified Area Council with effect from 1 August 1955. Its jurisdiction was expanded in 1972 to include the villages of Hulursingha and Baniabahal and parts of Turanga jungle and Ranigoda jungle. It was subsequently converted into a Municipal Council on 11 June 2008.

Angul Municipality is governed by the Odisha Municipal Act, 1950, which provides the statutory framework for municipal administration in the state. The municipality administers an area of 19.24 km².

The municipal administration is headed by Chairman Shri Akshya Kumar Samant and Executive Officer Sri Satyaprakash Tripathy.

Angul is part of Dhenkanal (Lok Sabha constituency).

In the 2024 Indian general election, Rudra Narayan Pany (BJP) won from Dhenkanal (Lok Sabha constituency) , which witnessed a closely watched contest between BJP and BJD.

In the 2019 Lok Sabha election, the Dhenkanal parliamentary constituency was won by Mahesh Sahoo of the BJD.

The MLA from Angul (Odisha Vidhan Sabha constituency) is Pratap Chandra Pradhan of BJP who was elected in the 2024 Odisha Legislative Assembly election by defeating BJD candidate Sanjukta Singh with a margin of 17,433 votes.

The former MLA of Angul was Rajani Kant Singh of the BJD He won the seat in State elections of 2004, 2009, and 2014 and also served as the Deputy Speaker of the Odisha Legislative Assembly. His father Adwait Prasad Singh had won this seat in 2000 as a BJD candidate, in 1990 as JD candidate and in 1977 as JNP candidate. Earlier MLAs from this seat were Ramesh Jena of INC in 1995, Prafulla Mishra of INC in 1985, and Santosh Kumar Pradhan of INC(I) in 1980.

Girija Nandini Sahoo of BJD was President of Zilla Parishad, Angul from 2012 to 2017.

Angul has been covered by several national government programmes. In education, the city has benefited from the PM SHRI (PM Schools for Rising India) and STARS (Strengthening Teaching-Learning and Results for States) programmes. The Pradhan Mantri Awas Yojana–Gramin (PMAY-G) has also been implemented in Angul district, while beneficiaries in the area have received assistance under the Ayushman Bharat programme.

== Climate ==
Climate data for Angul (1991–2020, extremes 1906–2012)
Month	Jan	Feb	Mar	Apr	May	Jun	Jul	Aug	Sep	Oct	Nov	Dec	Year
Record high °C (°F)	36.7 (98.1)	42.1 (107.8)	43.1 (109.6)	46.1 (115.0)	47.2 (117.0)	47.2 (117.0)	41.1 (106.0)	38.1 (100.6)	38.1 (100.6)	37.7 (99.9)	35.3 (95.5)	33.3 (91.9)	47.2 (117.0)
Mean daily maximum °C (°F)	28.7 (83.7)	32.1 (89.8)	36.6 (97.9)	39.8 (103.6)	40.2 (104.4)	36.8 (98.2)	32.5 (90.5)	32.0 (89.6)	32.5 (90.5)	32.7 (90.9)	30.6 (87.1)	28.7 (83.7)	33.7 (92.7)
Mean daily minimum °C (°F)	14.1 (57.4)	16.6 (61.9)	19.7 (67.5)	24.3 (75.7)	25.6 (78.1)	25.1 (77.2)	23.8 (74.8)	23.3 (73.9)	23.2 (73.8)	21.2 (70.2)	17.4 (63.3)	13.6 (56.5)	20.6 (69.1)
Record low °C (°F)	5.5 (41.9)	7.2 (45.0)	10.2 (50.4)	14.4 (57.9)	15.6 (60.1)	17.4 (63.3)	16.0 (60.8)	14.3 (57.7)	12.8 (55.0)	12.0 (53.6)	5.6 (42.1)	3.5 (38.3)	3.5 (38.3)
Average rainfall mm (inches)	10.4 (0.41)	14.4 (0.57)	22.9 (0.90)	38.0 (1.50)	81.2 (3.20)	172.6 (6.80)	301.7 (11.88)	285.5 (11.24)	214.2 (8.43)	105.2 (4.14)	17.4 (0.69)	9.1 (0.36)	1,272.6 (50.10)
Average rainy days	1.0	1.2	1.4	2.9	4.7	9.0	13.8	14.2	11.2	4.9	1.1	0.6	66.1
Average relative humidity (%) (at 17:30 IST)	58	51	46	46	48	63	74	77	76	69	63	60	61
Source: India Meteorological Department

Angul has been ranked 6th best “National Clean Air City” under (Category 3 population under 3 lakhs cities) in India.

== Economy ==
Angul's economy has a strong industrial base, with aluminium downstream industries forming a key part of its economic activity. The presence of National Aluminium Company Limited (NALCO) supports the aluminium sector and related industries. Engineering and fly-ash brick manufacturing also contribute to the district's industrial economy, creating linkages with manufacturing and construction activities.

== Notable sites ==
- Black Diamond Museum & Library
- Nalco Nagar
