= Angul district =

- District
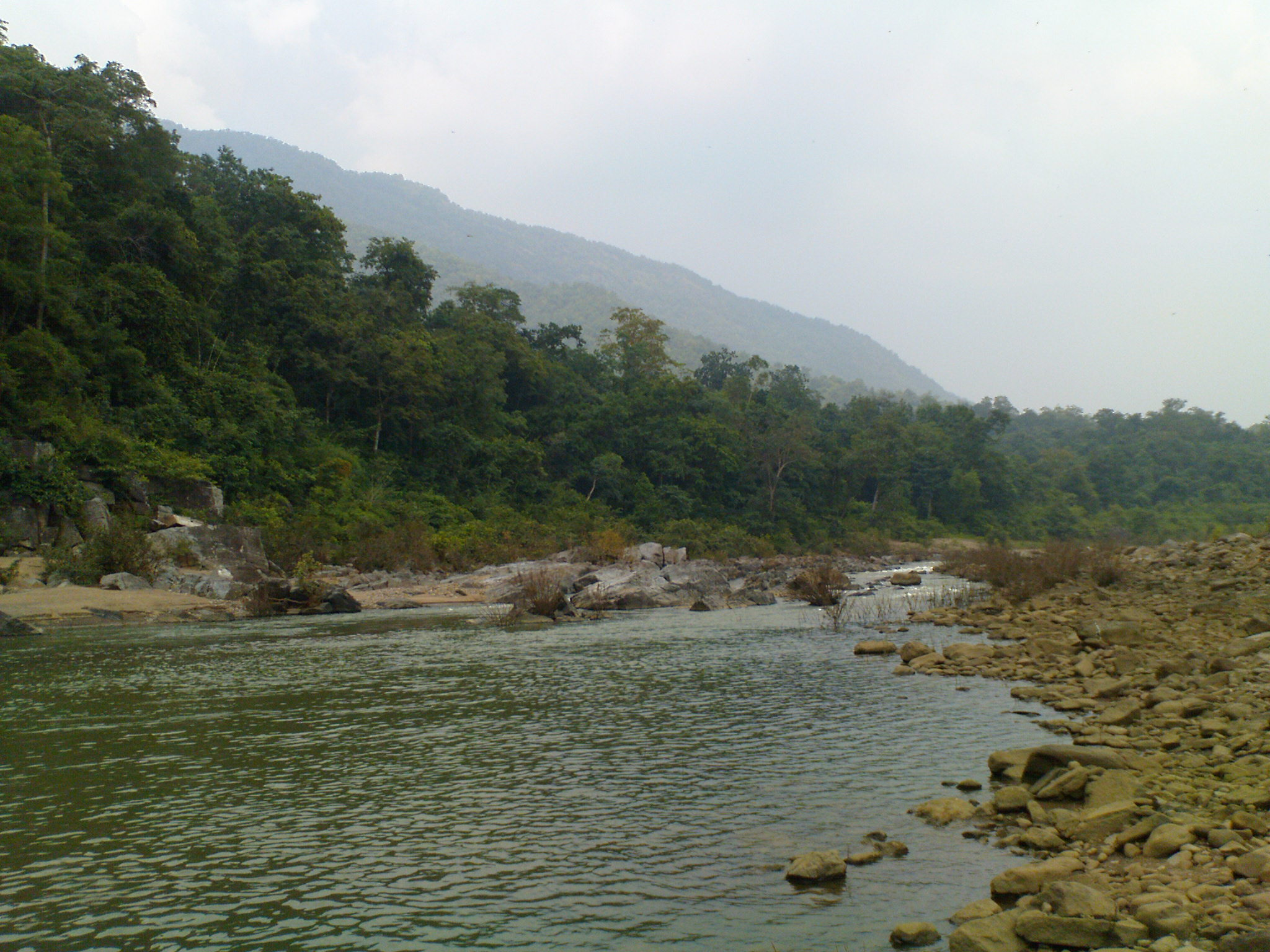
- Top: Nalconagar Jagannath Temple; Bottom: Panchadhara Ghati, Athmallik
- Interactive map of Angul district
- Coordinates: 20.833°N 85.1°E
- Country: India
- State: Odisha
- Established: 1 April 1993
- Headquarters: Angul

Government
  - Type: District
  - Collector & District Magistrate: Abdaal M. Akhtar, IAS
  - Superintendent of Police: Rahul Jain, IPS

Area
  - Total: 6,232 km^{2} (2,406 sq mi)
- Elevation: 875.5 m (2,872 ft)

Population (2011)
  - Total: 1,273,821
  - Density: 204.4/km^{2} (529.4/sq mi)

Languages
  - Official: Odia, English
- Time zone: UTC+5:30 (IST)
- PIN: 759100–759122
- Telephone code: 06764
- Vehicle registration: Angul OD-19, Talcher OD-35
- Nearest cities: Cuttack, Bhubaneswar, Sambalpur
- Sex ratio: 0.942 ♂/♀
- Literacy: 78.96%
- Vidhan Sabha constituency: 5
- Climate: Aw (Köppen)
- Precipitation: 1,421 mm (55.9 in)
- Average summer temperature: 47 °C (117 °F)
- Average winter temperature: 10 °C (50 °F)
- Website: angul.nic.in

Angul district, also known as Anugul district, is one of the thirty districts of Odisha in eastern India. The city of Angul is the district headquarters of Angul district. A major industrial hub of the state, the district hosts numerous industries relating to coal, bauxite and steel apart from extensive forests including the Satkosia Tiger Reserve.

== History ==
The name "Angul" of the district originates from its headquarters, Angul. According to L.S.S. O’Malley, the name is believed to be a transformation of "Anugol," with a legend attached. In the past, the region was inhabited by Khonds, Savaras, and Gonds, with Khonds being predominant. It was divided into principalities led by Khond chiefs, until the Odisha King established rule, aided by Rajputs and adventurers, over the Khonds who paid tribute. The last Khond chief, Anu, rebelled, and a conspiracy led to his deposition through a struggle called "gol." The conquerors commemorated their victory by naming the land "Anugol," which evolved into "Anugula" or "Anugol" in colloquial language.

The district is actually a conglomeration of various parts with differing administrative history. Angul subdivision, roughly the central part of the district, was initially a feudatory state under the East India Company who had entered into a treaty with its rules after the lapse of Maratha authority in the area around 1803. In 1847, the then raja, Somanath Singh, revolted against the Company and was therefore deposed and exiled. His state was escheated as a Government Estate and was attached to the Orissa Division for administrative convenience. A Tahsildar was appointed in charge of the same. In 1891, the Bengal Presidency Government constituted Angul into a separate district and added the Phulbani subdivision of present day Kandhamal district to it. A Deputy Commissioner cum District Magistrate was appointed with extensive powers. This continued till 1936 when the new state of Orissa abolished the district and merged the Angul portion with Cuttack district. It later formed a part of Dhenkanal district after 1949.

The Pallahara, Athamallik and Talcher subdivisions of the district were also separate feudatory states, known as Garhjats in Odisha. Each had a Raja as the ruler and a different administrative setup under the overall supervision of the Superintendent at Sambalpur. After 1949, like the Angul subdivision, these were all merged to form a part of the Dhenkanal district. On April 1, 1993, these were clubbed together and a new district with Angul as headquarters was constituted.

== Geography ==
Angul is located in the centre of the state of Odisha and lies between the latitudes of 20°31′N and 21°40′N and longitudes of 84°15′E and 85°23′E. The altitude is between 564 and 1,187 metres (1,850 and 3,894 ft). The district has an area of 6,232 km^{2} (2,406 sq mi). It is bounded by Dhenkanal and Cuttack district in the east, Deogarh, Kendujhar and Sundargarh district in north, Sambalpur and Sonepur in west and Boudh and Nayagarh in the south side. The district is abundant with natural resources. Angul, The district headquarters is about 150 kilometres (93 mi) from the state capital Bhubaneswar.

== Divisions ==
The district administration is headed by a Collector and District Magistrate, usually called the Collector who combines in his office the roles of revenue collection, law and order maintenance and implementation of development programmes. He is assisted at headquarters by two Additional District Magistrates (ADM) and by four Sub Collectors cum Sub Divisional Magistrates posted at Angul, Pallahara, Athamallik and Talcher for the first two roles. Below subdivision level, the district is divided into 8 Blocks which are co-terminus with Tahsils. While the former deals with the development aspect, the latter is a revenue unit. The Block Development Officer (BDO) and Tahsildar cum Executive Magistrate are the respective heads of each. The Collector is usually an officer of the Indian Administrative Service while the other officers belong to the Odisha Administrative Service.

The following is the list of blocks, tehsils and subdivisions in the district of Angul:

Sub-division

- Angul
- Athmallik
- Talcher
- Pallahara

Blocks

- Angul Sadar
- Athmallik Sadar
- Chhendipada
- Talcher Sadar
- Pallahada Sadar
- Banarpal
- Kishorenagar
- Kaniha

Tehsils

- Angul
- Athmallik
- Talcher
- Pallahada
- Chendipada
- Banarpal
- Kishorenagar
- Kaniha

In addition to the officers noted above, a chief development officer cum executive officer, Zila Parishad is posted at Angul. He supervises the functioning of the BDOs directly and reports to the Collector who is ex officio Chief Executive Officer of the Zila Parishad. Various line departments like education, health care, agriculture are headed by officers of the rank of Deputy Collectors who are also directly under the operational control of the Collector. All departments also have a parallel setup at the block level with the BDO directly supervising the field level functionaries. Each block is further divided into Gram Panchayats. Angul has a total of 225 Panchayats which are headed by an elected head called the Sarpanch assisted by an executive officer.

The three urban areas of Angul, Talcher and Athamallik are each headed by an executive officer who report to the Collector through the Project Director, District Urban Development Agency.

Maintenance of law and order is supervised by the Superintendent of Police (SP), an officer of the Indian Police Service. The SP is technically subordinate to the District Magistrate but in practice is almost completely independent except for certain statutory functions. He is assisted by Additional and Deputy SPs at the headquarters and by SDPOs at police subdivision levels. The district has a total of 25 thanas or Police Stations, each headed by an Inspector in-charge. Owing to the large industrial establishments and major mining related disputes, Angul has a heavier than usual police presence.

There are three Divisional Forest Officers posted in the District for Angul, Satkosia and Athamallik. They belong to the Indian Forest Service and are responsible for the preservation of wildlife and management of forests. In addition, the DFO at Deogarh exercises control over the Pallahara subdivision. A Regional Chief Conservator of Forests posted at Angul supervises them apart from heading the Satkosia Tiger Reserve.

The civil and criminal justice system are under the District and Sessions Judge at Angul. He is assisted by Additional District Judges, Civil Judges (Senior and Junior) Divisions and Sub Divisional Judicial Magistrates. The District Magistrate, ADM and SDMs are also Executive Magistrates and report to the District and Sessions Judge in that capacity.

== Demographics ==
Historical population
Year	Pop.	±% p.a.
1901	278,144	—
1911	287,294	+0.32%
1921	250,480	−1.36%
1931	309,044	+2.12%
1941	360,714	+1.56%
1951	408,041	+1.24%
1961	500,033	+2.05%
1971	628,537	+2.31%
1981	785,734	+2.26%
1991	961,037	+2.03%
2001	1,140,003	+1.72%
2011	1,273,821	+1.12%

According to the 2011 census, Angul district has a population of 1,273,821, ranking of 380th in India (out of a total of 640). The district has a population density of 199 inhabitants per square kilometre (520/sq mi). Its population growth rate over the decade 2001–2011 was 11.55%. Anugul has a sex ratio of 942 females for every 1000 males, and a literacy rate of 78.96%. 16.21% of the population lives in urban areas. Scheduled Castes and Scheduled Tribes make up 18.81% and 14.10% of the population respectively.

Religion in Angul district (2011)
Religion	Percent
Hinduism	98.81%
Islam	0.59%
Other or not stated	0.60%

Languages of Angul district (2011)
1. Odia (95.5%)
2. Ho (1.40%)
3. Hindi (1.30%)
4. Others (1.79%)

At the time of the 2011 Census of India, 95.50% of the population in the district spoke Odia, 1.41% Ho and 1.30% Hindi as their first language.

== Politics ==
=== Legislative Assembly Constituencies ===
The following are the five Vidhan Sabha constituencies of Angul district and the elected members of the Angul district:

No.	Constituency	Reservation	Extent of the Assembly Constituency (Blocks)	Member of 14th Assembly	Party
59	Pallahara	None	Pallahara, Kaniha (part)	Ashok Mohanty	BJP
60	Talcher	None	Talcher (M), Talcher, Kaniha (part)	Braja Kishore Pradhan	BJD
61	Angul	None	Angul (M), NALCO (C. T), Angul (part), Banarpal (part)	Pratap Pradhan	BJP
62	Chhendipada	SC	Chhendipada, Banarpal (part)	Agasti Behera	BJP
63	Athmallik	None	Athmallik (NAC), Athmallik, Kishorenagar, Angul (part)	Nalini Pradhan	BJD

=== Lok Sabha constituencies ===
Since 2008, Angul district is represented in Dhenkanal (Lok Sabha constituency) and Sambalpur (Lok Sabha constituency).

Angul (Lok Sabha constituency) does not exist in 1952 general elections to 1st Lok Sabha. However it is created from 2nd till 5th Lok Sabha during 1957 till 1976. Badakumar Pratap Gangadeb got elected in 1957 and 1971 for 2nd and 5th Lok Sabha while Harekrushna Mahatab was elected in 1962 to 3rd and D. N. Deb was elected in 1967 to 4th Lok Sabha. Angul Seat ceased after the creation of Deogarh (Lok Sabha constituency) in 1977 from 6th Lok Sabha. Deogarh seat was also delimited in 2008.

== Natural resources and coal mines ==
Angul district has the Radhikapur West coal block which is known for its good quality coal. In December 2020, the coal mines were auctioned for supplying to an Aluminium Smelter plant in Jharsuguda.
