= Dhenkanal Lok Sabha constituency =

Lok Sabha constituency in Odisha

Coordinates: 20.662499°N 85.598593°E

Dhenkanal OD-9
- Lok Sabha constituency
- Interactive Map Outlining Dhenkanal Lok Sabha constituency

Constituency details
- Country: India
- Region: East India
- State: Odisha
- Assembly constituencies: Dhenkanal; Hindol; Kamakhyanagar; Parjanga; Pallahara; Talcher; Angul
- Established: 1952
- Total electors: 15,33,702 (Note: as on 2024) (Note: as data published by election commission)
- Reservation: None

Member of Parliament
- 18th Lok Sabha
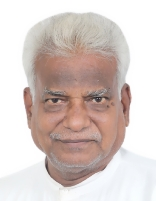
- Incumbent Rudra Narayan Pany
- Party: BJP
- Elected year: 2024

Dhenkanal Lok Sabha constituency is one of the 21 Lok Sabha (parliamentary) constituencies in Odisha state in eastern India.

== Assembly Segments ==
After delimitation of Dhenkanal Lok Sabha constituency, the seven legislative assembly segments which constitute this parliamentary constituency are Before delimitation in 2008, legislative assembly segments which constituted this parliamentary constituency were: Birmaharajpur, Athmallik, Angul, Hindol, Dhenkanal, Gondia and Kamakhyanagar.

#	Name	District	Member	Party	Leading (in 2024)
55	Dhenkanal	Dhenkanal	Krushna Chandra Patra	BJP	BJP
56	Hindol (SC)	Dhenkanal	Simarani Nayak	BJP	BJP
57	Kamakhyanagar	Dhenkanal	Satrughan Jena	BJP	BJP
58	Parjanga	Dhenkanal	Bibhuti Bhusan Pradhan	BJP	BJP
59	Pallahara	Angul	Ashok Mohanty	BJP	BJP
60	Talcher	Angul	Braja Kishore Pradhan	BJD	BJD
61	Angul	Angul	Pratap Chandra Pradhan	BJP	BJP

== Elected members ==
Vote share of winning candidates
2024	50.24%
2019	46.14%
2014	33.25%
2009	31.05%
2004	53.59%
1999	61.75%
1998	51.02%
1996	47.65%
1991	51.23%
1989	58.94%
1984	72.74%
1980	63.04%
1977	56.69%
1971	42.23%

Since its formation in 1952, 18 elections have been held till date. It was a two-member constituency in 1952.

List of members elected from Dhenkanal constituency are

Year	Member	Party
As Dhenkanal West Cuttack Constituency
1952 (Note: It was a 2 member constituency)	Niranjan Jena	Indian National Congress
1952	Sarangadhar Das	Socialist Party
As Dhenkanal Constituency
1957	Surendra Mohanty	Ganatantra Parishad
1962	Baishnab Charan Patnaik	Indian National Congress
1967	Kamakhya Prasad Singh Deo	Swatantra Party
1971	Devendra Satpathy	Indian National Congress
1977	Devendra Satpathy	Bharatiya Lok Dal
1980	Kamakhya Prasad Singh Deo	Indian National Congress (I)
1984	Kamakhya Prasad Singh Deo	Indian National Congress
1989	Bhajaman Behara	Janata Dal
1991	Kamakhya Prasad Singh Deo	Indian National Congress
1996	Kamakhya Prasad Singh Deo	Indian National Congress
1998	Tathagata Satpathy	Biju Janata Dal
1999	Kamakhya Prasad Singh Deo	Indian National Congress
2004	Tathagata Satpathy	Biju Janata Dal
2009	Tathagata Satpathy	Biju Janata Dal
2014	Tathagata Satpathy	Biju Janata Dal
2019	Mahesh Sahoo	Biju Janata Dal
2024	Rudra Narayan Pany	Bharatiya Janata Party

== Election results ==
=== 2024 ===
Voting were held on 25 May 2024 in 6th phase of Indian General Election. Counting of votes was on 4 June 2024. In 2024 election, Bharatiya Janata Party candidate Rudra Narayan Pany defeated Biju Janata Dal candidate Avinash Samal by a margin of 76,567 votes.

2024 Indian general election: Dhenkanal
Party	Candidate	Votes	%	±%
BJP	Rudra Narayan Pany	598,721	50.24	
BJD	Avinash Samal	5,22,154	43.82	
INC	Sashmita Behera	34,730	2.91	
NOTA	None of the above	13,777	1.16	
Majority		76,567	6.42	
Turnout		12,02,003	78.37	
BJP gain from BJD				

=== 2019 ===
In 2019 election, Biju Janata Dal candidate Mahesh Sahoo defeated Bharatiya Janata Party candidate Rudra Narayan Pany by a margin of 35,412 votes.

2019 Indian general elections: Dhenkanal
Party	Candidate	Votes	%	±%
BJD	Mahesh Sahoo	522,884	46.21	
BJP	Rudra Narayan Pany	487,472	43.08	
INC	Kamakhya Prasad Singh Deo	80,349	7.10	
NOTA	None of the above	11,254	0.99	
Majority		35,412	3.13	
Turnout		1,133,213	75.33	
BJD hold				

=== 2014 ===
In 2014 election, Biju Janata Dal candidate Tathagata Satpathy defeated Bharatiya Janata Party candidate Rudra Narayan Pany by a margin of 1,37,340 votes.

2014 Indian general elections: Dhenkanal
Party	Candidate	Votes	%	±%
BJD	Tathagata Satpathy	453,277	43.50	
BJP	Rudra Narayan Pany	315,937	30.32	
INC	Sudhir Kumar Samal	213,794	20.52	
NOTA	None of the above	13,205	1.27	
Majority		137,340	13.18	
Turnout		1,042,111	76.43	
BJD hold				

=== 2009 ===
In 2014 election, Biju Janata Dal candidate Tathagata Satpathy defeated Indian National Congress candidate Chandra Sekhar Tripathi by a margin of 1,86,587 votes.

2009 Indian general elections: Dhenkanal
Party	Candidate	Votes	%	±%
BJD	Tathagata Satpathy	398,568	31.05	
INC	Chandra Sekhar Tripathi	211,981	16.51	
BJP	Rudra Narayan Pany	208,296	16.23	
Majority		186,587	21.78	
Turnout		856,631	66.74	
BJD hold				
