= Deogarh Lok Sabha constituency =

Defunct Lok Sabha constituency

Coordinates: 21.537281°N 84.726713°E

Deogarh
- Former Lok Sabha constituency

Constituency details
- Country: India
- State: Orissa
- Established: 1952
- Abolished: 2008

Deogarh was a Lok Sabha constituency in Orissa state in eastern India till 2008. Assembly constituencies which constituted this parliamentary constituency were: Pallahara, Talcher, Brajarajnagar, Jharsuguda, Laikera, Kuchinda and Deogarh. After 2008, some of the constituencies went into Bargarh and some into Dhenkanal.

== Members of Parliament ==
Year	Member	Party
Before 1977: Constituency does not exist
1977	Pabitra Mohan Pradhan	Janata Party
1980	Pabitra Mohan Pradhan	Janata Party
1984	Sriballav Panigrahi	Congress
1989	Ravi Narayan Pani	Janata Dal
1991	Sriballav Panigrahi	Congress
1996	Ravi Narayan Pani	Janata Dal
1998	Debendra Pradhan	BJP
1999	Debendra Pradhan	BJP
2004	Dharmendra Pradhan	BJP
2008 Onwards: Constituency does not exist

== See also ==
- Debagarh district
- List of former constituencies of the Lok Sabha
