= Kamakhyanagar Assembly constituency =

Constituency of the Odisha legislative assembly in India

Coordinates: 20.93°N 85.56°E

Kamakhyanagar
- Constituency No. 57 for the Odisha Legislative Assembly

Constituency details
- Country: India
- Region: East India
- State: Odisha
- Division: Northern Division
- District: Dhenkanal
- Lok Sabha constituency: Dhenkanal
- Established: 1957
- Total electors: 2,19,965 (Note: as on 2024) (Note: as data published by election commission)
- Reservation: None

Member of Legislative Assembly
- 17th Odisha Legislative Assembly
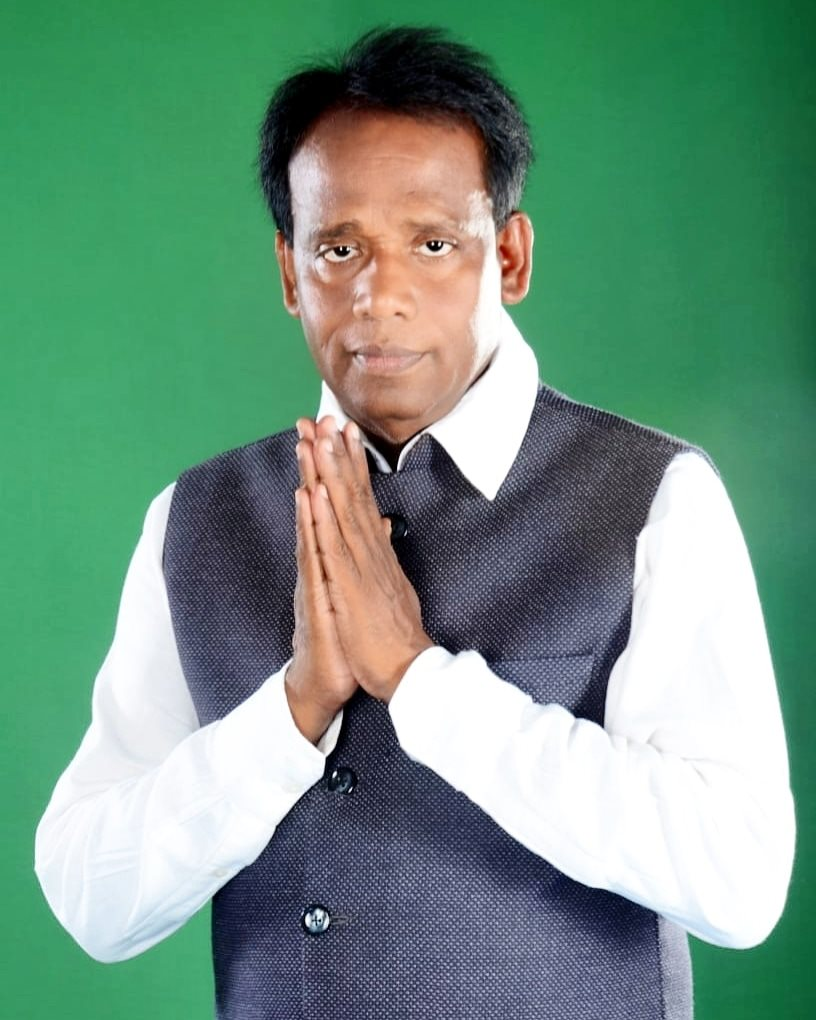
- Incumbent Satrughan Jena
- Party: Bharatiya Janata Party
- Elected year: 2024

Kamakhyanagar is a Vidhan Sabha constituency of Dhenkanal district, Odisha.

Area of this constituency includes Kamakhyanagar, Bhuban, 15 GPs (Badasuanlo, Jagannathpur, Bhairapur, Baruan(K), Baunspal, Kanapura, Baisinga, Baligorad, Mahulapal, Kadua, Rainarasinghpur, Sogar, Budhibilli, Bankual and Kotagara) of Kamakshyanagar block and 7 GPs (Barada, Gengutia, Sankulei, Tarva, Chaulia, Sogarpasi and Bansingh) of Dhenkanal block, and Bhuban block.

In 1985 election, Bharatiya Janata Party candidate Prasanna Pattnaik was elected from Kamakhyanagar to become the first BJP MLA from Odisha.

== Elected members ==
Vote share of winning candidates
2024	49%
2019	51.58%
2014	43.59%
2009	45.11%
2004	44.84%
2000	51.71%
1997 (bypoll)	61.17%
1995	60.75%
1990	51.79%
1985	48.15%
1980	58.54%
1977	41.87%

Since its formation in 1957, 17 elections were held till date including one bypoll in 1997.

List of members elected from Kamakshyanagar constituency are:

Year	Member	Party
2024	Satrughan Jena	Bharatiya Janata Party
2019	Prafulla Kumar Mallik	Biju Janata Dal
2014	Prafulla Kumar Mallik	Biju Janata Dal
2009	Prafulla Kumar Mallik	Biju Janata Dal
2004	Prafulla Kumar Mallik	Biju Janata Dal
2000	Brahmananda Biswal	Biju Janata Dal
1997 (bypoll) (Note: Death of Kailash Chandra Mohapatra)	Premalata Mohapatra	Indian National Congress
1995	Kailash Chandra Mohapatra	Indian National Congress
1990	Prasanna Patanayak	Janata Dal
1985	Prasanna Patanayak	Bharatiya Janata Party
1980	Kailash Chandra Mohapatra	Indian National Congress (I)
1977	Prasanna Patanayak	Janata Party
1974	Brahmananda Biswal	Indian National Congress
1971	Brahmananda Biswal	Indian National Congress
1967	Brundaban Tripathy	Swatantra Party
1961	Brundaban Tripathy	Swatantra Party
1957	Ratnaprava Devi	Ganatantra Parishad

== Election results ==
=== 2024 ===
Voting were held on 25 May 2024 in 3rd phase of Odisha Assembly Election & 6th phase of Indian General Election. Counting of votes was on 4 June 2024. In 2024 election, Bharatiya Janata Party candidate Satrughan Jena defeated Biju Janata Dal candidate Prafulla Kumar Mallik by a margin of 4,662 votes.

2024 Odisha Vidhan Sabha Election, Kamakshyanagar
Party	Candidate	Votes	%	±%
BJP	Satrughan Jena	84,589	49	▲8.38
BJD	Prafulla Kumar Mallik	79,927	46.3	▼5.28
INC	Biprabar Sahu	3,430	1.99	
NOTA	None of the above	1,905	1.1	
Majority		4,662	2.7	
Turnout		1,72,632	78.48	
BJP gain from BJD				

=== 2019 ===
In 2019 election, Biju Janata Dal candidate Prafulla Kumar Mallik defeated Bharatiya Janata Party candidate Satrughan Jena by a margin of 16,509 votes.

2019 Vidhan Sabha Election, Kamakshyanagar
Party	Candidate	Votes	%	±%
BJD	Prafulla Kumar Mallik	81,695	51.58	
BJP	Satrughan Jena	65,186	41.16	
INC	Bhabani Sankar Mohaptra	6,694	4.23	
NOTA	None of the above	1,453	0.92	
Majority		16,509	10.42	
Turnout		158379	73.71	
BJD hold				

=== 2014 ===
In 2014 election, Biju Janata Dal candidate Prafulla Kumar Mallik defeated Indian National Congress candidate Bhabani Sankar Mohaptra by a margin of 16,881 votes.

2014 Vidhan Sabha Election, Kamakshyanagar, Kamakshyanagar
Party	Candidate	Votes	%	±%
BJD	Prafulla Kumar Mallik	64,163	43.59	▼1.52
INC	Bhabani Sankar Mohaptra	47,282	32.12	▲4.29
BJP	Prasanna Pattnaik	25,927	17.61	▲8.18
NOTA	None of the above	1,965	1.33	−
Majority		16,881	11.47	▼5.81
Turnout		1,47,198	76.74	11.74
Registered electors		1,91,817		
BJD hold				

=== 2009 ===
In 2009 election, Biju Janata Dal candidate Prafulla Kumar Mallik defeated Indian National Congress candidate Satrughan Jena by a margin of 20,594 votes.

2009 Vidhan Sabha Election, Kamakshyanagar
Party	Candidate	Votes	%	±%
BJD	Prafulla Kumar Mallik	53,766	45.11	−
INC	Satrughan Jena	33,172	27.83	−
SP	Kailash Chandra Mishra	19,217	16.12	−
BJP	Premananda Jena	11,241	9.43	−
Majority		20,594	17.28 (Note: %of total valid votes)	−
Turnout		1,19,203	65.00	−
BJD hold				
