= Talcher Assembly constituency =

Constituency of the Odisha legislative assembly in India

Coordinates: 20.95°N 85.20°E

Talcher
- Constituency No. 60 for the Odisha Legislative Assembly

Constituency details
- Country: India
- Region: East India
- State: Odisha
- Division: Northern Division
- District: Angul
- Lok Sabha constituency: Dhenkanal
- Established: 1951
- Total electors: 1,64,354 (Note: as on 2024) (Note: as data published by election commission)
- Reservation: None

Member of Legislative Assembly
- 17th Odisha Legislative Assembly
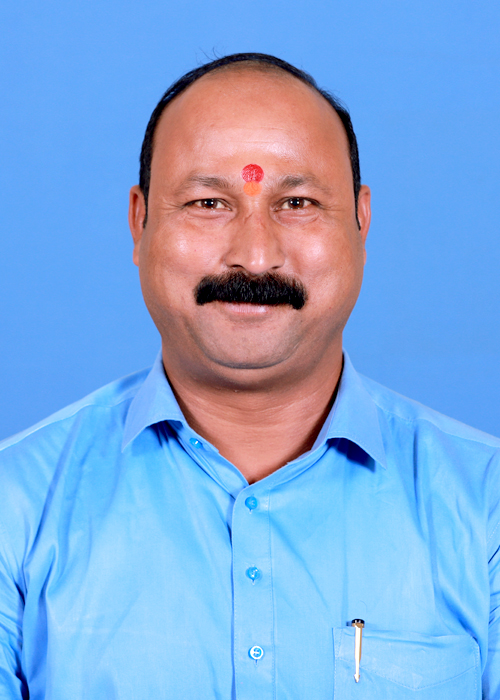
- Incumbent Braja Kishore Pradhan
- Party: Biju Janata Dal
- Elected year: 2024

Talcher is a Vidhan Sabha constituency of the city Talcher in Angul district, Odisha.

This constituency includes Talcher, Talcher block and 7 GPs (Kaniha, Kamarei, Badatribida, Santribida, Bijigol, Badagunduri and Jarada) of Kaniha block.

== Elected members ==
Vote share of winning candidates
2024	58.82%
2019	54.89%
2014	46.95%
2009	36.21%
2004	45.95%
2000	52.44%
1995	36.88%
1990	44.47%
1985	57.59%
1980	50.06%
1977	71.06%

Since its formation in 1951, 18 elections were held till date including one bypoll in 1961.

List of members elected from Talcher constituency are:

Year	Member	Party
2024	Braja Kishore Pradhan	Biju Janata Dal
2019	Braja Kishore Pradhan	Biju Janata Dal
2014	Braja Kishore Pradhan	Biju Janata Dal
2009	Braja Kishore Pradhan	Independent politician
2004	Mahesh Sahoo	Bharatiya Janata Party
2000	Mahesh Sahoo	Bharatiya Janata Party
1995	Mahesh Sahoo	Bharatiya Janata Party
1990	Brundaban Behera	Independent politician
1985	Bhajaman Behera	Indian National Congress
1980	Brundaban Behera	Janata Party
1977	Brundaban Behera	Janata Party
1974	Brundaban Behera	Orissa Jana Congress
1971	Brundaban Behera	Orissa Jana Congress
1967	Kumar Chandra Behera	Orissa Jana Congress
1961 (bypoll) (Note: Resignation of Pabitra Mohan Pradhan)	Madan Mohan Pradhan	Indian National Congress
1961	Pabitra Mohan Pradhan	Indian National Congress
1957	Pabitra Mohan Pradhan	Indian National Congress
1952	Pabitra Mohan Pradhan	Indian National Congress

== Election results ==
=== 2024 ===
Voting were held on 25 May 2024 in 3rd phase of Odisha Assembly Election & 6th phase of Indian General Election. Counting of votes was on 4 June 2024. In 2024 election, Biju Janata Dal candidate Braja Kishore Pradhan defeated Bharatiya Janata Party candidate Kalandi Charan Samal by a margin of 32,122 votes.

2024 Odisha Vidhan Sabha Election, Talcher
Party	Candidate	Votes	%	±%
BJD	Braja Kishore Pradhan	75,621	58.82	
BJP	Kalandi Charan Samal	43,499	33.83	
INC	Prafula Chandra Das	6,189	4.81	
NOTA	None of the above	976	0.76	
Majority		32,122	24.99	
Turnout		1,28,565	78.22	
BJD hold				

=== 2019 ===
In 2019 election, Biju Janata Dal candidate Braja Kishore Pradhan defeated Bharatiya Janata Party candidate Kalandi Charan Samal by a margin of 24,102 votes.

2019 Odisha Legislative Assembly election: Talcher
Party	Candidate	Votes	%	±%
BJD	Braja Kishore Pradhan	70,044	54.87	
BJP	Kalandi Charan Samal	45,942	35.99	
INC	Suresh Chandra Behera	4,621	3.62	
NOTA	None of the above	780	0.61	
Majority		24,102	18.88	
Turnout		1,27,634	72.59%	
BJD hold				

=== 2014 ===
In 2014 election, Biju Janata Dal candidate Braja Kishore Pradhan defeated Bharatiya Janata Party candidate Kalandi Charan Samal by a margin of 14,322 votes.

2014 Vidhan Sabha Election, Talcher
Party	Candidate	Votes	%	±%
BJD	Braja Kishore Pradhan	56,465	46.95	
BJP	Kalandi Charan Samal	43 ,143	35.04	
INC	Sashmita Behera	14,396	11.97	
NOTA	None of the above	882	0.73	−
Majority		14,322	11.90	3.45
Turnout		1,20,268	76.14	8.36
Registered electors		1,57,963		
BJD gain from Independent				

=== 2009 ===
In 2009 election, Independent candidate Braja Kishore Pradhan defeated Biju Janata Dal candidate Mahesh Sahoo by a margin of 8,642 votes.

2009 Vidhan Sabha Election, Talcher
Party	Candidate	Votes	%	±%
Independent	Braja Kishore Pradhan	37,048	36.21	−
BJD	Mahesh Sahoo	28,406	27.77	−
BJP	Kalandi Charan Samal	17,415	17.02	−
INC	Khirod Sahu	7,636	7.46	−
Majority		8,642	8.45 (Note: % of total valid votes)	−
Turnout		1,02,309	67.78	−
Independent gain from BJP				
