= Pallahara Assembly constituency =

Constituency of the Odisha legislative assembly in India

Coordinates: 21.43°N 85.20°E

Pallahara
- Constituency No. 59 for the Odisha Legislative Assembly

Constituency details
- Country: India
- Region: East India
- State: Odisha
- Division: Northern Division
- District: Angul
- Lok Sabha constituency: Dhenkanal
- Established: 1951
- Total electors: 1,78,632 (Note: as on 2024) (Note: as data published by election commission)
- Reservation: None

Member of Legislative Assembly
- 17th Odisha Legislative Assembly
- Incumbent Ashok Mohanty
- Party: Bharatiya Janata Party
- Elected year: 2024

Pallahara is a Vidhan Sabha constituency of Angul district, Odisha.

This constituency includes Pallahara block and 19 GPs (Balipasi, Kuluma, Rengali, Susuba, Arkil, Gandamula, Bajrakote, Hanumanpur, Dalaka, Karnapal, Parabil, Burukuna, Kulei, Deranga, Kakudia, Talapada, Biru, Hariharapur and Samal) of Kaniha block.

== Elected members ==
Vote share of winning candidates
2024	48.64%
2019	43.12%
2014	34.59%
2009	37.96%
2004	53.20%
2000	36.82%
1995	45.64%
1990	74.94%
1985	43.97%
1980	39.68%
1977	34.65%

Since its formation in 1951, 17 elections were held. It was a 2 member constituency in 1951.

List of members elected from Pallahara constituency are:

Year	Member	Party
2024	Ashok Mohanty	Bharatiya Janata Party
2019	Mukesh Kumar Pal	Biju Janata Dal
2014	Mahesh Sahoo	Biju Janata Dal
2009	Ravi Narayan Pani	Biju Janata Dal
2004	Nrusingha Charan Sahu	Indian National Congress
2000	Dharmendra Pradhan	Bharatiya Janata Party
1995	Bibhudhendra Pratap Das	Indian National Congress
1990	Nrusingha Charan Sahu	Janata Dal
1985	Bibhudhendra Pratap Das	Indian National Congress
1980	Bibhudhendra Pratap Das	Indian National Congress (I)
1977	Dharanidhar Pradhan	Independent politician
1974	Narayan Sahu	Indian National Congress
1971	Narayan Sahu	Indian National Congress (R)
1967	Pabitra Mohan Pradhan	Orissa Jana Congress
1961	Pabitra Mohan Pradhan	Orissa Jana Congress
1957	Mrutyunjaya Pal	Ganatantra Parishad
1952	Mahesh Chandra Subahusingh	Indian National Congress
1952	Baidhar Naik	Indian National Congress

== Election results ==
=== 2024 ===
Voting were held on 25 May 2024 in 3rd phase of Odisha Assembly Election & 6th phase of Indian General Election. Counting of votes was on 4 June 2024. In 2024 election, Bharatiya Janata Party candidate Ashok Mohanty defeated Biju Janata Dal candidate Mukesh Kumar Pal by a margin of 1,333 votes.

2024 Odisha Vidhan Sabha Election, Pallahara
Party	Candidate	Votes	%	±%
BJP	Ashok Mohanty	71,560	48.64	
BJD	Mukesh Kumar Pal	63,997	43.50	
INC	Fakir Mohan Samal	6,444	4.38	
NOTA	None of the above	1,633	1.11	
Majority		7,563	5.14	
Turnout		1,47,117	82.36	
BJP gain from BJD				

=== 2019 ===
In 2019 election, Biju Janata Dal candidate Mukesh Kumar Pal defeated Bharatiya Janata Party candidate Ashok Mohanty by a margin of 6,214 votes.

2019 Vidhan Sabha Election, Pallahara
Party	Candidate	Votes	%	±%
BJD	Mukesh Kumar Pal	59,350	43.12	
BJP	Ashok Mohanty	53,136	38.61	
INC	Subrat Garnayak	12,266	8.91	
NOTA	None of the above	1,234	0.9	
Majority		6,214	4.51	
Turnout		1,37,640	80.94	
BJD hold				

=== 2014 ===
In 2014 election, Biju Janata Dal candidate Mahesh Sahoo defeated Bharatiya Janata Party candidate Ashok Mohanty by a margin of 5,294 votes.

2014 Vidhan Sabha Election, Pallahara
Party	Candidate	Votes	%	±%
BJD	Mahesh Sahoo	44,264	34.59	
BJP	Ashok Mohanty	38,970	30.46	
INC	Subodh Chandra Pani	18,487	14.45	
NOTA	None of the above	1135	0.89	−
Majority		5,294	41.37	36.31
Turnout		1,27,958	83.83	9.9
Registered electors		1,52,634		
BJD hold				

=== 2009 ===
In 2009 election, Biju Janata Dal candidate Ravi Narayan Pani defeated Bharatiya Janata Party candidate Dharmendra Pradhan by a margin of 5,467 votes.

2009 Vidhan Sabha Election, Pallahara
Party	Candidate	Votes	%	±%
BJD	Ravi Narayan Pani	40,980	37.96	−
BJP	Dharmendra Pradhan	35,513	32.90	−
INC	Bibhudhendra Pratap Das	21,258	19.69	−
Majority		5,467	5.06 (Note: % of total valid votes)	−
Turnout		1,07,959	73.93	−
BJD gain from INC				
