= Abdoulaye Sané =

Senegalese footballer (born 1992)

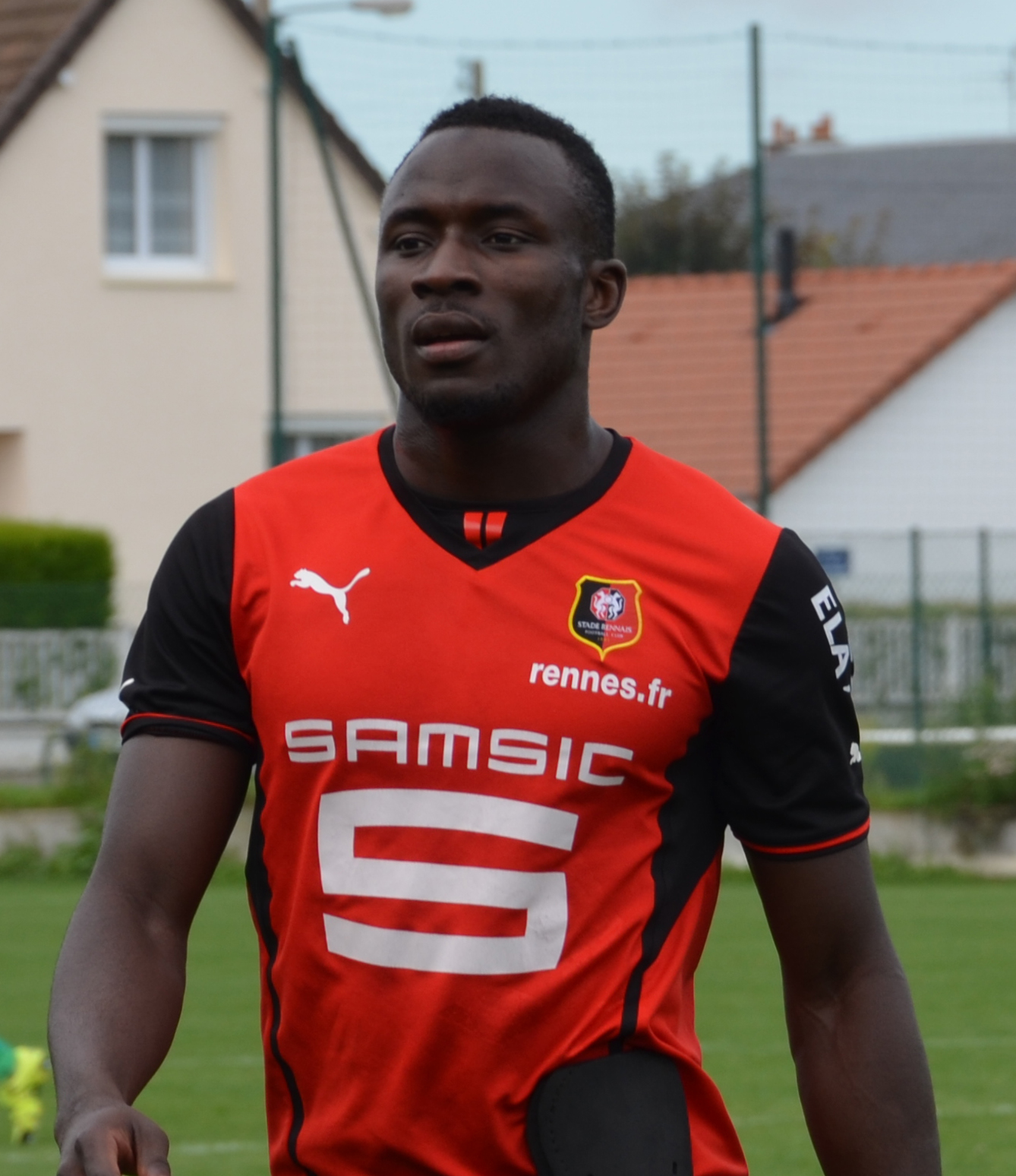
- Sané with Rennais in 2015

Personal information
- Date of birth: 15 October 1992 (age 34)
- Place of birth: Diouloulou, Senegal
- Height: 1.84 m (6 ft 0 in)
- Position: Striker

Youth career
- AS Douanes

Senior career*
| Years | Team | Apps | (Gls) |
| 2010–2011 | AS Douanes | 16 | (6) |
| 2011–2016 | Rennes | 15 | (0) |
| 2012–2016 | → Rennes II | 34 | (20) |
| 2013 | → Laval (loan) | 4 | (0) |
| 2013 | → Laval II (loan) | 5 | (0) |
| 2016–2018 | Red Star | 63 | (17) |
| 2018–2020 | Sochaux | 58 | (14) |
| 2020–2021 | Al-Taawoun | 27 | (3) |
| 2022–2023 | Churchill Brothers | 17 | (7) |
| 2023–2024 | Nîmes | 6 | (2) |
| 2025 | Kowloon City | 13 | (1) |

International career^{‡}
| 2011 | Senegal U23 | 1 | (1) |
| 2011 | Senegal | 1 | (0) |
- * Club domestic league appearances and goals as of 18 May 2025 ‡ National team caps and goals as of 5 January 2012

Abdoulaye Sané (born 15 October 1992) is a Senegalese professional footballer who plays as a forward.

== Club career ==
Sané began his career with AS Douanes in the Senegal Premier League. Following a successful trial in April 2011, he moved to Rennes in the July, signing a three-year deal. After two years with Rennes, he was loaned to Laval to gain more playing time, in the French second tier.

After becoming out of contract with Rennes in 2016, he signed with Red Star FC.

After a successful 2017–18 season in the French third tier with Red Star FC in which he scored 15 goals, he signed with second-tier Sochaux on 1 June 2018.

On 9 August 2020, Sané signed a two-year deal with Al-Taawoun.

On 13 August 2022, Sané signed with I-League club Churchill Brothers on a one-year deal. He took part in the 2022 Baji Rout Cup, where Churchill Brothers finished runners-up. He scored three goals in two appearances. He made his league debut on 15 November against Rajasthan United in their 2–1 defeat.

On 24 January 2024, Sané went on trial at Championnat National club Nîmes. He eventually signed a contract that last until the end of the season with Nîmes in February.

On 16 January 2025, Sané joined Hong Kong Premier League club Kowloon City.

== Personal life ==
Sané holds Senegalese and French nationalities.

== Career statistics ==
=== Club ===
As of 19 January 2024

Appearances and goals by club, season and competition
| Club | Season | League | | | National Cup (Note: Includes Coupe de France, King Cup) | | League Cup (Note: Includes Coupe de la Ligue, Baji Rout Cup) | | Continental | | Total | |
| Club | Season | Division | Apps | Goals | Apps | Goals | Apps | Goals | Apps | Goals | Apps | Goals |
|---|---|---|---|---|---|---|---|---|---|---|---|---|
| Rennes | 2011–12 | Ligue 1 | 0 | 0 | 1 | 0 | 0 | 0 | — | | 1 | 0 |
| Rennes | 2012–13 | Ligue 1 | 15 | 0 | 0 | 0 | 2 | 0 | — | | 17 | 0 |
| Rennes | Total | | 15 | 0 | 1 | 0 | 2 | 0 | 0 | 0 | 18 | 0 |
| Rennes II | 2012–13 | CFA 2 | 9 | 3 | — | | — | | — | | 9 | 3 |
| Rennes II | 2014–15 | CFA 2 | 4 | 2 | — | | — | | — | | 4 | 2 |
| Rennes II | 2015–16 | CFA 2 | 21 | 15 | — | | — | | — | | 21 | 15 |
| Rennes II | Total | | 34 | 20 | 0 | 0 | 0 | 0 | 0 | 0 | 34 | 20 |
| Laval (loan) | 2013–14 | Ligue 2 | 4 | 0 | 0 | 0 | 0 | 0 | — | | 4 | 0 |
| Laval II (loan) | 2013–14 | CFA 2 | 5 | 0 | — | | — | | — | | 5 | 0 |
| Red Star | 2016–17 | Ligue 2 | 34 | 4 | 1 | 2 | 1 | 0 | — | | 36 | 6 |
| Red Star | 2017–18 | Championnat National | 29 | 13 | 0 | 0 | 3 | 0 | — | | 32 | 13 |
| Red Star | Total | | 63 | 17 | 1 | 2 | 4 | 0 | 0 | 0 | 67 | 17 |
| Sochaux | 2018–19 | Ligue 2 | 33 | 4 | 2 | 1 | 1 | 0 | — | | 36 | 5 |
| Sochaux | 2019–20 | Ligue 2 | 25 | 10 | 0 | 0 | 1 | 0 | — | | 26 | 10 |
| Sochaux | Total | | 58 | 14 | 2 | 1 | 2 | 0 | 0 | 0 | 62 | 15 |
| Al-Taawoun | 2020–21 | Saudi Professional League | 27 | 3 | 3 | 0 | — | | — | | 30 | 3 |
| Churchill Brothers | 2022–23 | I-League | 17 | 7 | 0 | 0 | 2 | 3 | — | | 19 | 10 |
| Nîmes | 2023–24 | Championnat National | 6 | 2 | 0 | 0 | 0 | 0 | — | | 6 | 2 |
| Kowloon City | 2024–25 | Hong Kong Premier League | 1 | 0 | 0 | 0 | 0 | 0 | — | | 1 | 0 |
| Career Total | | | 230 | 63 | 7 | 3 | 10 | 3 | 0 | 0 | 247 | 69 |

== Honours ==
- Churchill Brothers
- Baji Rout Cup runner-up: 2022
