= Hindol Assembly constituency =

Assembly constituency in Odisha

Coordinates: 20.61°N 85.20°E

Hindol
- Constituency No. 56 for the Odisha Legislative Assembly

Constituency details
- Country: India
- Region: East India
- State: Odisha
- Division: Northern Division
- District: Dhenkanal
- Lok Sabha constituency: Dhenkanal
- Established: 1974
- Total electors: 2,63,522 (Note: as on 2024) (Note: as data published by election commission)
- Reservation: SC

Member of Legislative Assembly
- 17th Odisha Legislative Assembly
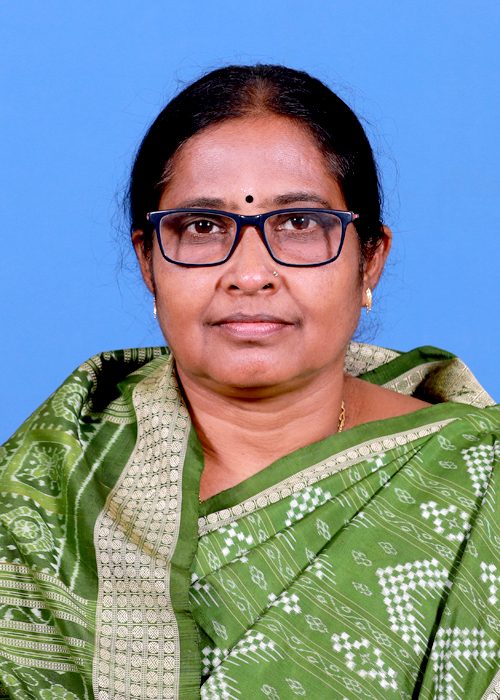
- Incumbent Simarani Nayak
- Party: Bharatiya Janata Party
- Elected year: 2024

Hindol is a Vidhan Sabha constituency of Dhenkanal district, Odisha.

Area of this constituency includes Hindol block and Odapada block.

== Elected members ==
Vote share of winning candidates
2024	49.62%
2019	50.93%
2014	49.92%
2009	44.83%
2004	48.22%
2000	62.54%
1995	48.29%
1991 (bypoll)	64.27%
1990	78.31%
1985	67.18%
1980	43.49%
1977	52.06%

Since its formation in 1974, 13 elections were held till date including one bypoll in 1993.

List of members elected from Hindol constituency are:

Year	Member	Party
2024	Simarani Nayak	Bharatiya Janata Party
2019	Simarani Nayak	Biju Janata Dal
2014	Simarani Nayak	Biju Janata Dal
2009	Anjali Behera	Biju Janata Dal
2004	Anjali Behera	Biju Janata Dal
2000	Anjali Behera	Biju Janata Dal
1995	Maheswar Naik	Indian National Congress
1993 (bypoll) (Note: Death of Trinath Naik)	Patta Nayak	Janata Dal
1990	Trinath Naik	Janata Dal
1985	Rabinarayan Naik	Indian National Congress
1980	Trinath Naik	Janata Party (Secular)
1977	Trinath Naik	Janata Party
1974	Bhagirathi Naik	Indian National Congress

== Election Results ==
=== 2024 ===
Voting were held on 25 May 2024 in 3rd phase of Odisha Assembly Election & 6th phase of Indian General Election. Counting of votes was on 4 June 2024. In 2019 election, Bharatiya Janata Party candidate Simarani Nayak defeated Biju Janata Dal candidate Mahesh Sahoo by a margin of 11,827 votes.

2024 Odisha Vidhan Sabha Election, Hindol
Party	Candidate	Votes	%	±%
BJP	Simarani Nayak	97,795	49.62	
BJD	Mahesh Sahoo	85,968	43.62	
INC	Gobardhan Sekhar Naik	7,314	3.71	
NOTA	None of the above	3,106	1.58	
Majority		11,827	3.00	
Turnout		1,97,073	74.78	
BJP gain from BJD				

=== 2019 ===
In 2019 election, Biju Janata Dal candidate Simarani Nayak defeated Bharatiya Janata Party candidate Ashok Kumar Nayak by a margin of 18,905 votes.

2019 Vidhan Sabha Election, Hindol
Party	Candidate	Votes	%	±%
BJD	Simarani Nayak	93,980	50.93	
BJP	Ashok Kumar Nayak	75,075	40.69	
INC	Trinath Behera	9366	5.08	
NOTA	None of the above	2,098	1.14	
Majority		18,905	10.24	
Turnout		1,84,525	72.58	
BJD hold				

=== 2014 ===
In 2014 election, Biju Janata Dal candidate Simarani Nayak defeated Bharatiya Janata Party candidate Laxmidhar Behera by a margin of 50,499 votes.

2014 Vidhan Sabha Election, Hindol
Party	Candidate	Votes	%	±%
BJD	Simarani Nayak	84,351	49.92	5.09
BJP	Laxmidhar Behera	33,852	20.03	2.81
INC	Namita Naik	30,978	18.33	−15.32
Independent	Anjali Behera	12,304	7.28	
NOTA	None of the above	2,722	1.61	−
Majority		50,499	29.88	18.7
Turnout		1,68,974	74.06	11.81
Registered electors		2,28,159		
BJD hold				

=== 2009 ===
In 2009 election, Biju Janata Dal candidate Anjali Behera defeated Indian National Congress candidate Rebati Behera by a margin of 15,039 votes.

2009 Vidhan Sabha Election, Hindol
Party	Candidate	Votes	%	±%
BJD	Anjali Behera	60,291	44.83	−
INC	Rebati Behera	45,252	33.65	−
BJP	Laxmidhar Behera	23,157	17.22	−
Majority		15,039	11.18 (Note: %of total valid votes)	−
Turnout		1,34,530	62.25	−
BJD hold				
