= Prasanna Pattnaik =

Indian politician (1948–2025)

Member of the Odisha Legislative Assembly for Kamakshyanagar
- In office March 1985 – March 1995
- In office March 1977 – March 1980

Personal details
- Born: Prasanna Pattnaik; 1 June 1948 Bhuban, Orissa, India
- Died: 30 May 2025 (aged 76) Bhubaneswar, Odisha, India
- Party: Bharatiya Janata Party
- Other political affiliations: Janata Dal (1990–1995); BJP (1985–1990); Janata Party (1977–1984)
- Spouse: Nalini Prabha Patnaik
- Children: Two
- Profession: Politician; social worker

Prasanna Pattnaik (1 June 1948 – 30 May 2025) was an Indian politician and the first Bharatiya Janata Party (BJP) MLA of Odisha. He was elected three times to the Odisha Legislative Assembly from Kamakhyanagar constituency.

He worked to establish the BJP in Odisha during the 1980s, and rejoined the BJP along with his wife Nalini Prabha Patnaik in 2014, to further establish the BJP in the 2014 Odisha Assembly elections.

== Early life ==
Prasanna Pattnaik was born on 1 June 1948 in a small village, Bhuban, in Dhenkanal District of the Indian State of Odisha (Then Orissa). His father was Narayana Pattnaik. His interest in politics started from his student life.

== Political career ==
Prasanna Pattnaik started his political career as a student leader in the historic student movement of 1964 in Odisha. Thereafter, he joined the Swatantra Party headed by Late R.N. Singhdeo (the then Chief Minister of Odisha) where he was the President of the Yuva Swatantra Party, Dhenkanal District and State Executive Member of the Swatantra Party. After liquidation of the Swatantra Party and the merger with Lok Dal, Prasanna Pattnaik became the State executive member and District General Secretary of Dhenkanal District.

He actively took part in the total revolution headed by Late Jayaprakash Narayan known as the JP Movement which gained momentum in 1974, and got arrested along with many leaders, and this gave a start to his political career in Odisha politics. He joined the total revolution of the J.P. Movement in 1975 and was detained under MISA for 18 months (and kept in Dhenkanal and Palahara Jail) and DIR. After the lifting of the National Emergency, he was released from jail and he joined Bharatiya Jana Sangha. Thereafter, the Janata Party was formed under the leadership of Late Chandrasekhar (Ex-Prime Minister of India). He contested for the Janata Party and won the Legislative Assembly seat from Kamakhyanagar constituency in the year 1977 at the age of 28 years making him the youngest MLA in Odisha (a record still valid today).

In 1980, Bharatiya Jana Sanga revived again as the Bharatiya Janata Party and Prasanna Pattnaik became the National Executive Member of the BJP under the leadership of Shri Atal Bihari Vajpayee. He was also the General Secretary of the Odisha Unit. He played a vital role in establishing the party in Odisha by winning the only Legislative Assembly seat for his party (Bharatiya Janata Party) from the same constituency, Kamakhayanagar in the 1985 elections. Thus, he earned the distinction of being the first BJP MLA of Odisha and was the only BJP representative in the Odisha Legislative Assembly then. He was recognized by the Speaker of the Odisha Legislative Assembly as the Leader of the BJP and the Opposition. He contributed to the education system of his village (Bhuban and Kamakhyanagar) by founding many schools and colleges.

Later he joined Janata Dal under the leadership of Sri. Biju Patnaik. He was elected for the third time from the same constituency in the year 1990. After facing defeat in 1995 Assembly elections, he took a sabbatical from politics. During this time, he worked as a social worker for the development of Kamakhyanagar and Bhuban. After a long gap, Prasanna Pattnaik returned to active politics by re-joining the BJP along with his wife, Nalini Prabha Pattnaik and hundreds of followers in 2014. He contested for the BJP from Kamakhyanagar in 2014 Odisha Assembly elections. Even after joining the BJP in the last moment before the 2014 Odisha Assembly elections, Prasanna Pattnaik helped the BJP gain a commendable 8.18% more votes in comparison to the previous assembly elections. He was a permanent State Executive Member of the BJP Odisha Unit. He continued to work to strengthen the position of the BJP in Odisha.

== Death ==
Pattnaik died on 30 May 2025, at the age of 76.

== Legislative history ==
House	Constituency	Start	End	Party	Notes
10th Vidhan Sabha	Kamakshyanagar	1990	1995	Janata Dal	
9th Vidhan Sabha	Kamakshyanagar	1985	1990	Bharatiya Janata Party	First BJP MLA in Odisha
7th Vidhan Sabha	Kamakshyanagar	1977	1980	JNP	
