= Simarani Nayak =

Indian politician

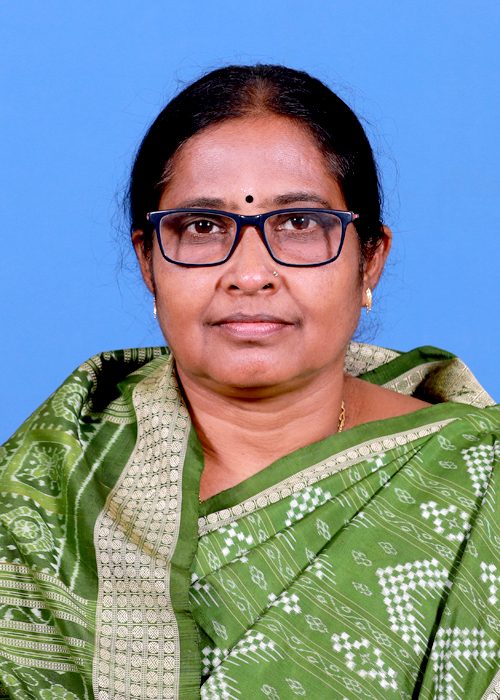
Simarani Nayak, Politician from Odisha

Simarani Nayak (born 1964) is an Indian politician from Odisha. She is a three time MLA from Hindol Assembly Constituency in Dhenkanal District. She represents Bharatiya Janata Party. She won the 2024 Odisha Legislative Assembly election.

== Early life and education ==
Nayak is from Hindol and her late husband was a doctor. She is a home maker and a social worker. She completed her Class 12 in 1985 at Government Secondary Training School, Dhenkanal. Earlier, she did her Class 11 at Dhalpur High School, Dhalpur H.S.C.E, Odisha in 1982.

== Career ==
Nayak won the 2024 Odisha Legislative Assembly election from Hindol Assembly Constituency representing Bharatiya Janata Party. She polled 97,795 votes and defeated Mahesh Sahoo of the Biju Janata Dal by a margin of 11,827 votes. After she was denied a ticket, she left the BJD and joined the BJP in April 2024. She retained her seat, which she had won on Biju Janata Dal ticket in 2019 Odisha Legislative Assembly election defeating Ashok Kumar Nayak of Bharatiya Janata Party by a margin of 18,905 votes. She first won the Hindol seat in the 2014 Odisha Legislative Assembly election representing BJD.
