= Kulei =

- Village
- Location in Odisha Kulei (India)
- Coordinates: 21.084°N 85.127°E
- Country: India
- State: Odisha
- District: Angul

Population (2011)
  - Total: 1,486
- Demonym: କୁଲିଆ
- Time zone: UTC+5:30 (IST)
- PIN: 759100
- Telephone code: 06760
- Vehicle registration: OD-35
- Nearest city: Talcher, Angul, Cuttack, Bhubaneswar
- Literacy: 73%
- Lok Sabha constituency: Dhenkanal

Kulei is a traditional Indian village belongs to Angul district of Odisha. Kulei is the 6th most populous village in Samal Barrage sub district of Angul district. The area of the village is 3 km^{2}, making it the 17th largest village in the subdistrict. The population density of Kulei is 516 people per km^{2}. 0.54 km^{2}, (19%) of which is covered with forest.

Talcher is the nearest town to the village and distance from Kulei is 18 km. The village comes under Kulei grama panchayat. District headquarter is Angul which is 40 km away from village. Distance from State capital Bhubaneswar is 143 km. Pincode of village Kulei is 759100.

== History ==
Kulei was an important village of Talcher kingdom during royal empire. The village was a halt after crossing river Brahmani towards Palalahara state towards west and Dhenkanal State towards north of Talcher state. The village is surrounded by Barachala hill (known as Baruan Pahada) and river Brahmani which helped the soldiers of state to prevent external entry of enemy.

== Demographics ==
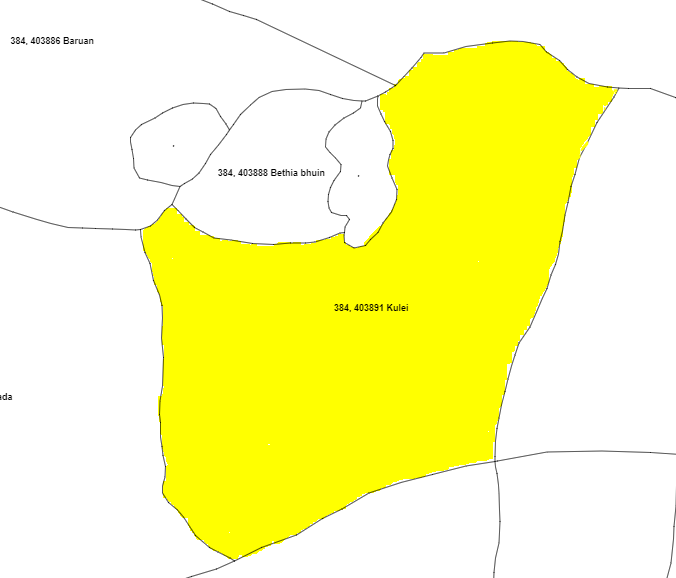
Map of Kulei

As of 2011 census, population of village is 1,486. Out of which 780 are male and 706 are females. Sex ratio is 905 female per 1,000 male in the village. Children aged below 6 years are 202 which is 13.59% of total population of village. There are total 110 male child against 92 girl child. Child sex ratio is 836 which is lower than state average of 941 as per 2011 census.

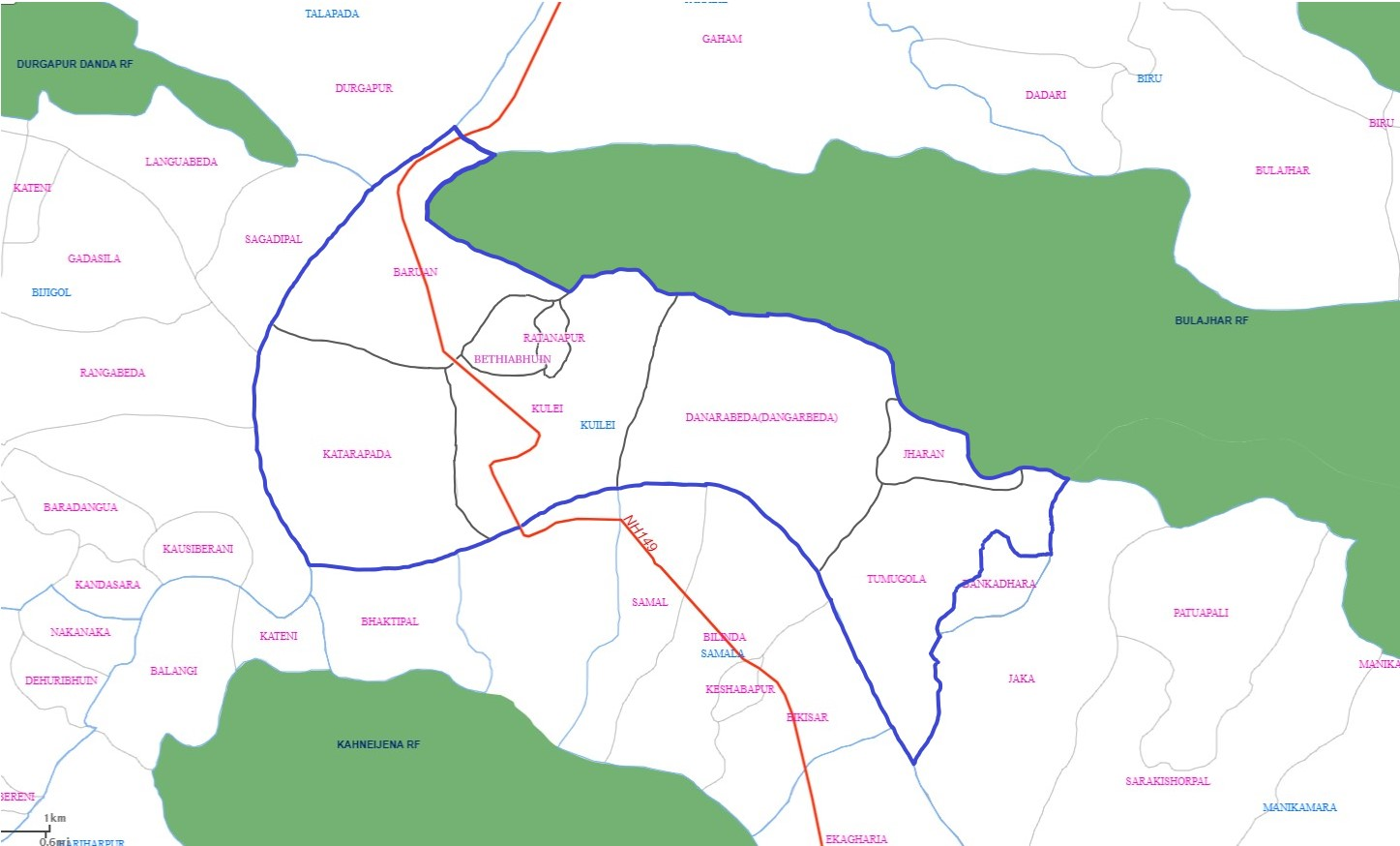
KULEI GP WITH VILLAGE BOUNDARY

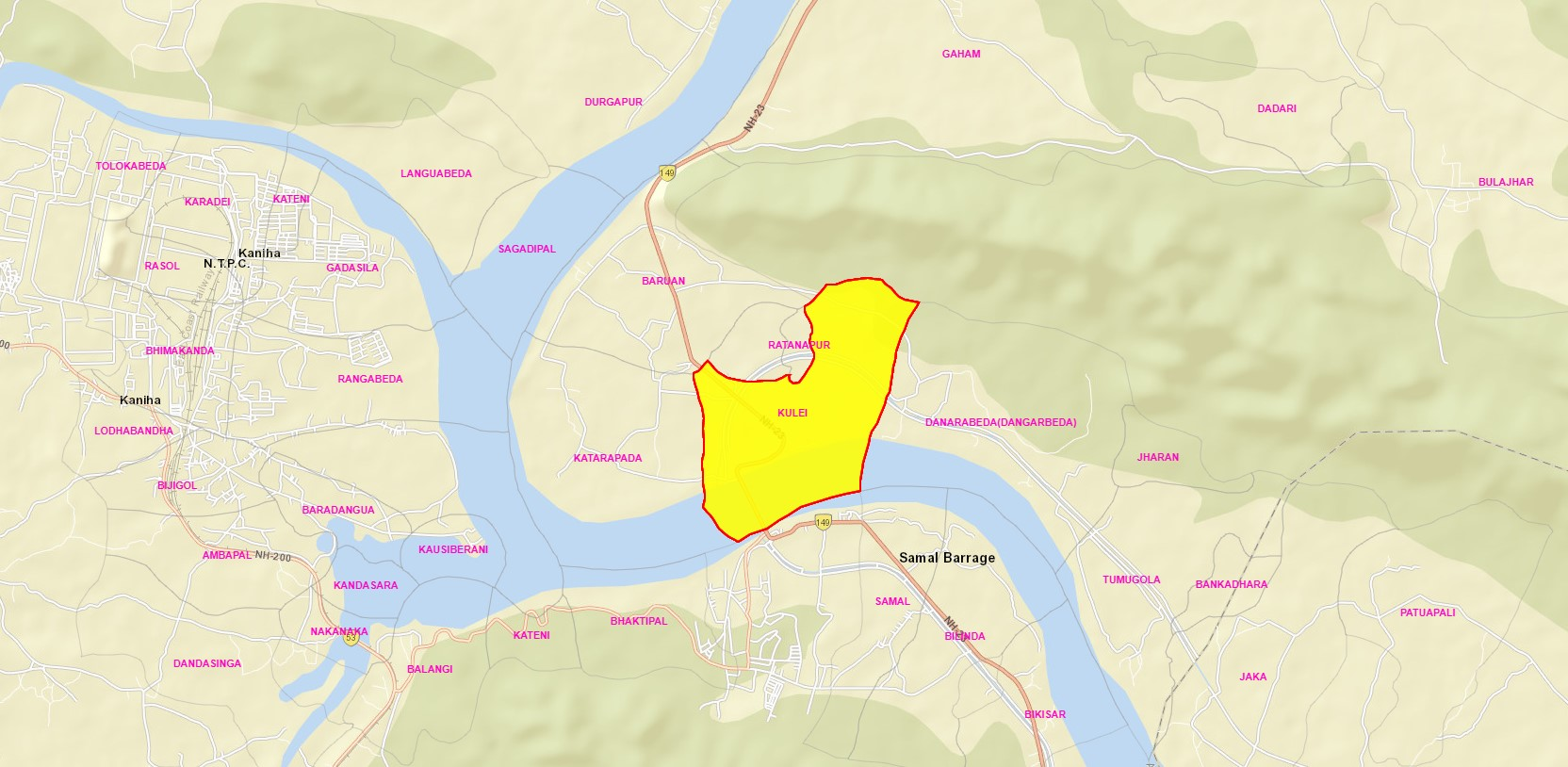
KULEI VILLAGE STREET MAP

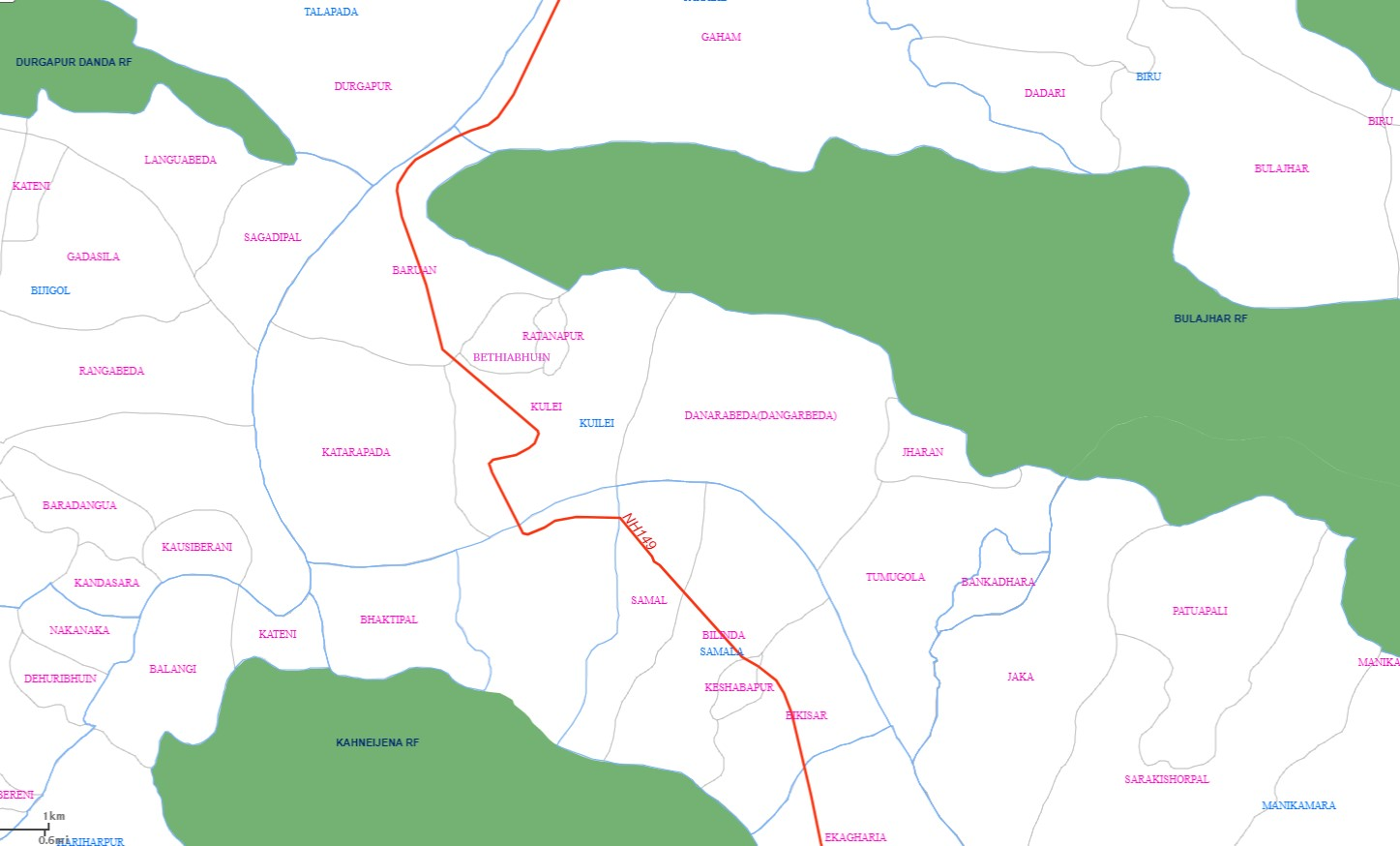
KULEI GP

There are 362 households in the village. 68% of the whole population is general caste, 20% are schedule caste and 12% are schedule Tribe.

Total 942 people are literate in the village, among 567 are male and 375 are female. Literacy rate of the village Kulei was 73.36% compared to 72.87% of the state. Male literacy is 84.63% against 61.07% female literacy. Pin Code of Kulei is 759146 which comes under dhenkanal postal division (Sambalpur Region)

Village has 34% (506) population engaged in either main or marginal works. 54% of them are male and 12% are female. 38% of male and 7% of female population are full-time worker, whereas 16% of male and 5% of female are part-time workers.

== Economy ==
Village economy is vastly dependent on agriculture, farming and small business. Some peoples are engaged at OPCL (mini hydro plant of 5MW) in the village. Some are servicing for government and private sector industries. Economy is influenced by the industries of the district Angul.

== Administration ==
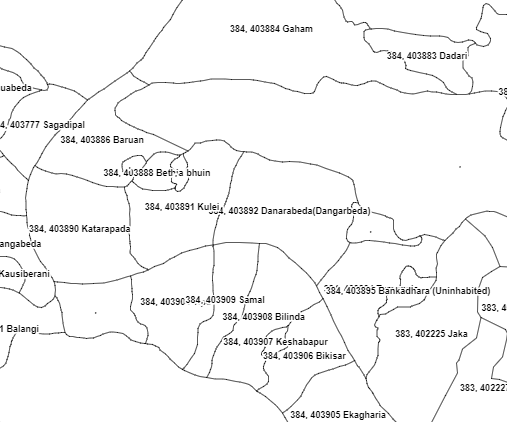
Kulei Administrative

Kulei village is administrated by Sarpanch, who is elected representative of grama panchayat. Kulei grama panchayat is consist of 9 villages, i.e. Baruan, Bethiabhuin, Dangarabeda, Gadadharpur, Jharana, Katarapada, Kulei, Ratanpur and Tumugola.

== Education ==
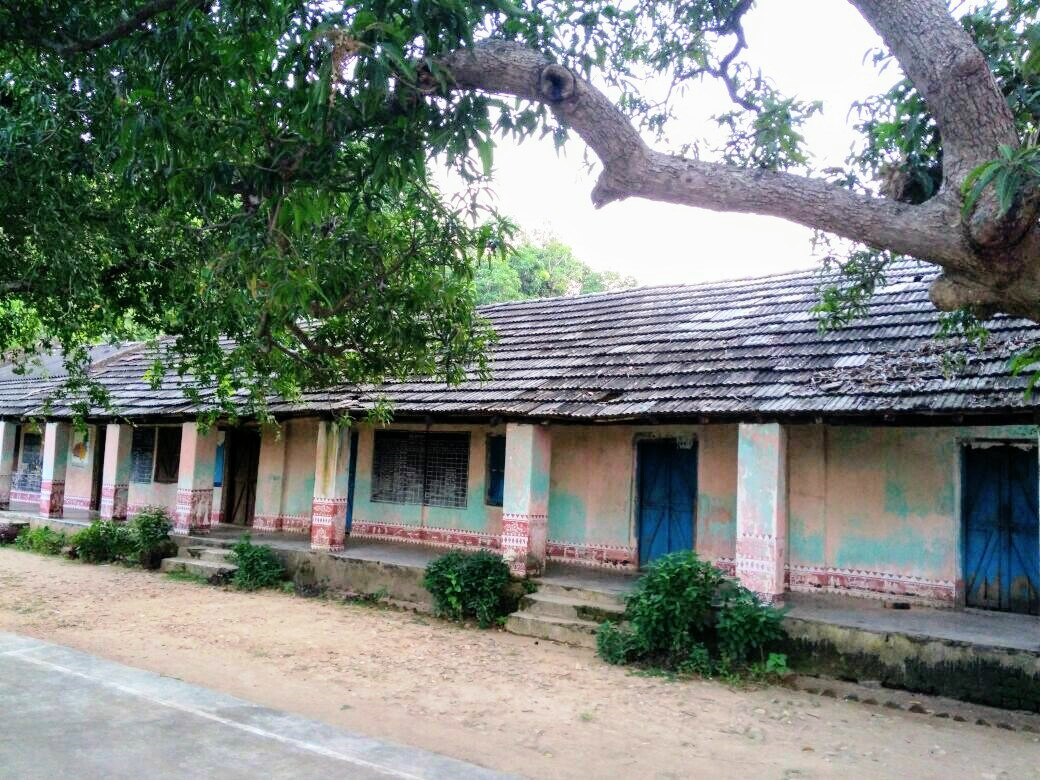
UP School Kulei1

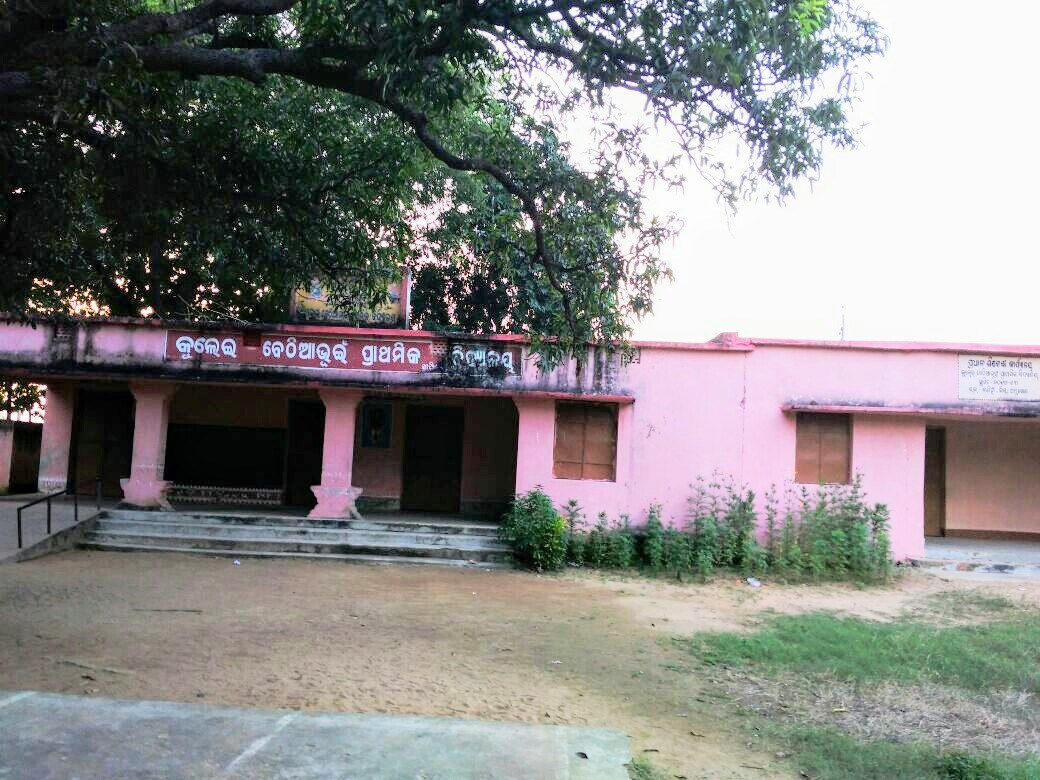
UP School Kulei2

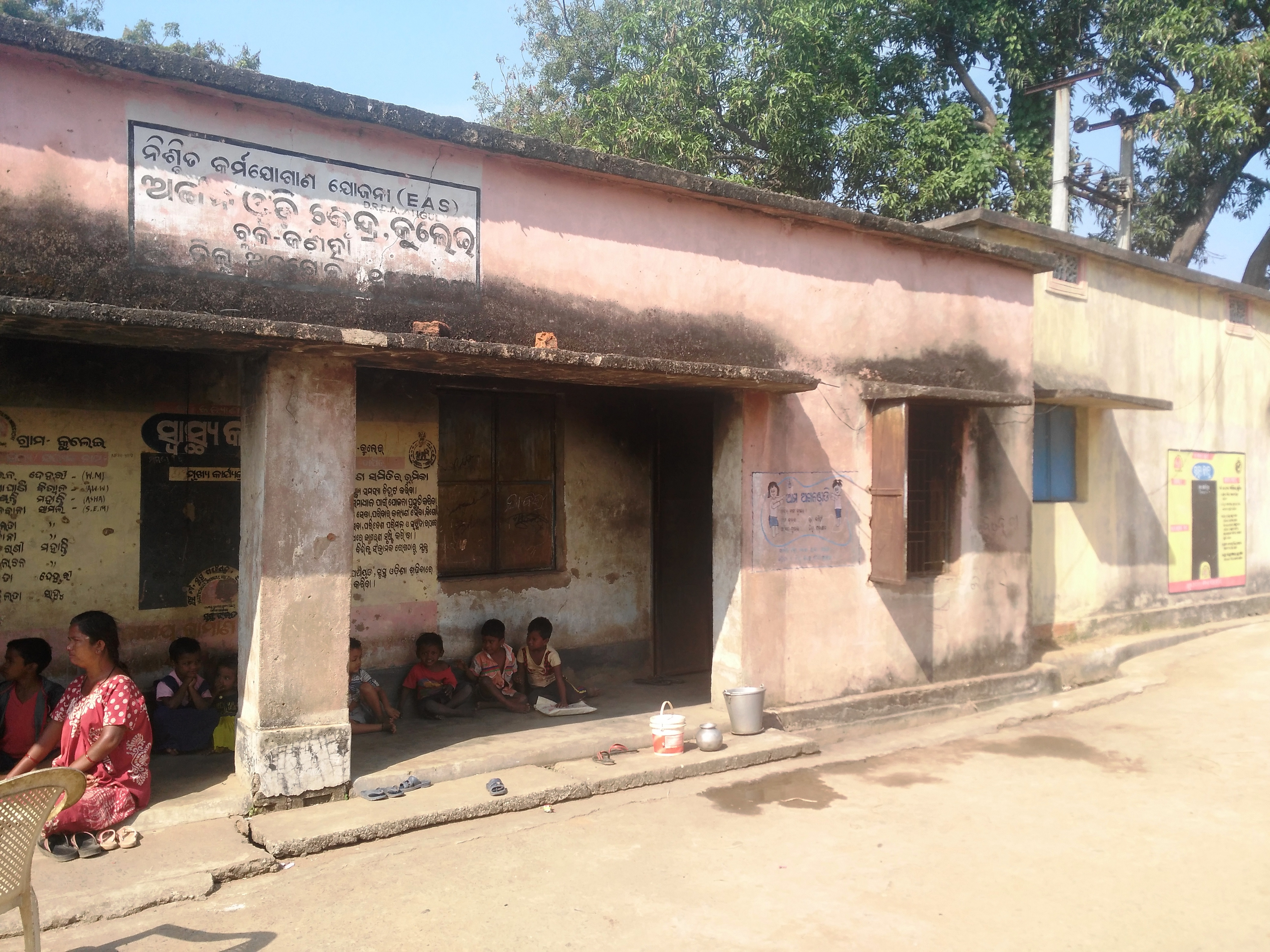
Anganwadi Center Kulei

There is primary school, Upper primary school and High school available in the village. Anganwadi education for kids is also running by state govt. For college education students are dependent near by cities.

== Health ==
There is a primary health centre available in village and runs by state government. But for major treatment villagers are dependent on Talcher sub divisional hospital.

== Sports ==
The most popular sport of the village is cricket. However football, volleyball, kabadi, kho-kho, satranja, bahuchori, luchakali, etc. are also played in the village.

== Festivals and functions ==
Makara Sankranti and Durga puja (Dushera) are the main festival of village. Pana Sankrati, Mangala puja, Ganesh puja, Saraswati puja, Janmastami, Holi, Deepabali, Kumar Purnima, Bada Osha, Khudurukuni, etc. are also celebrated throughout the year.

== Landmark ==
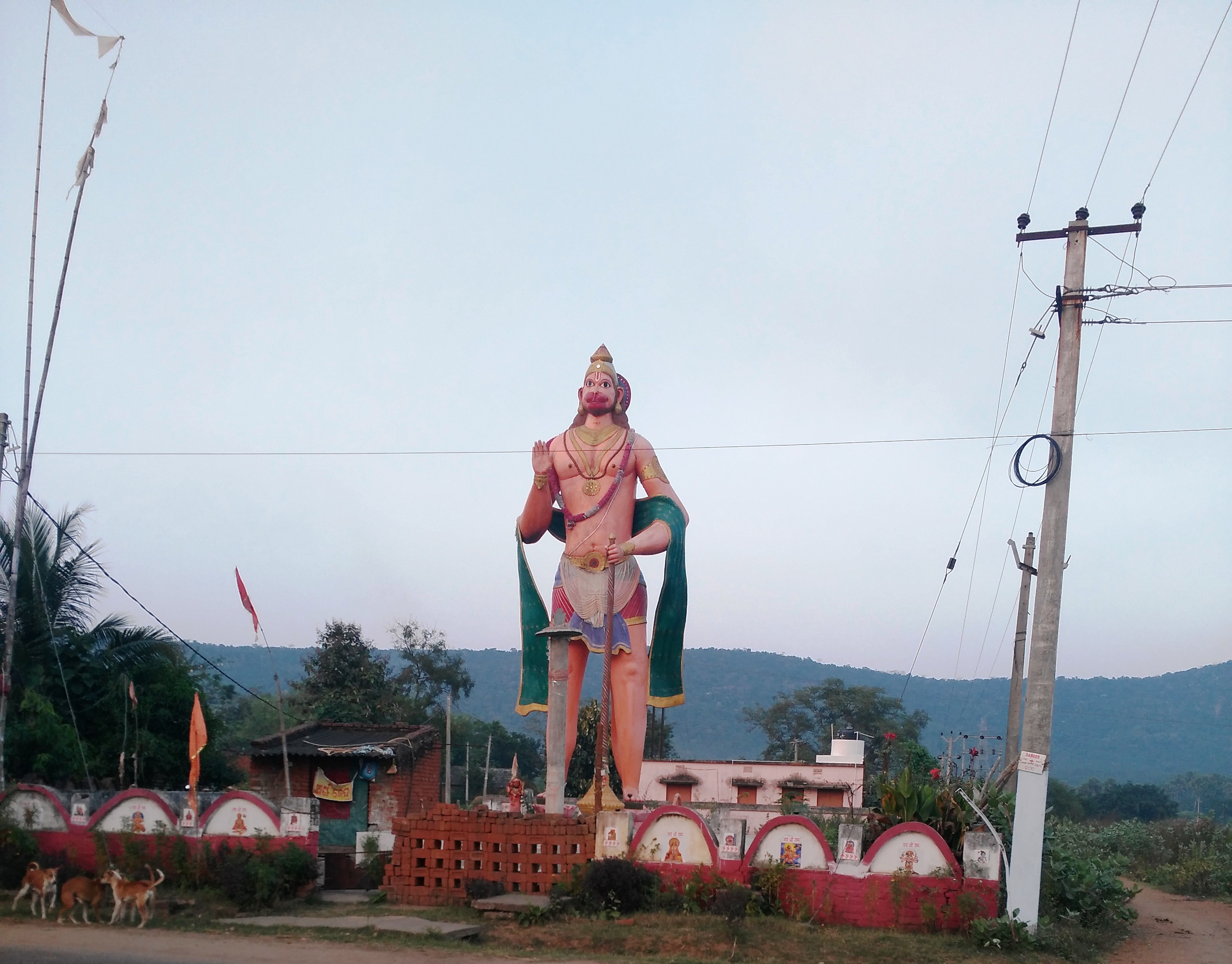
Hanuman Statue Kulei

Kulei is situated on the bank of river Brahmani and shadow of Barachal hill. The statue of lord Hunuman at the entry of village is the landmark for the village. This is the biggest statue of Hanuman in terms of height (30 ft) in Angul district.

== Industries ==
Nearest industries of the village are NTPC Kaniha, MCL, Nalco, FCI, Jindal, Lanco, Bhusan, OPCL, Samal Barrage, etc. Youth of the village are working in these nearby industries.

== Place of interest ==
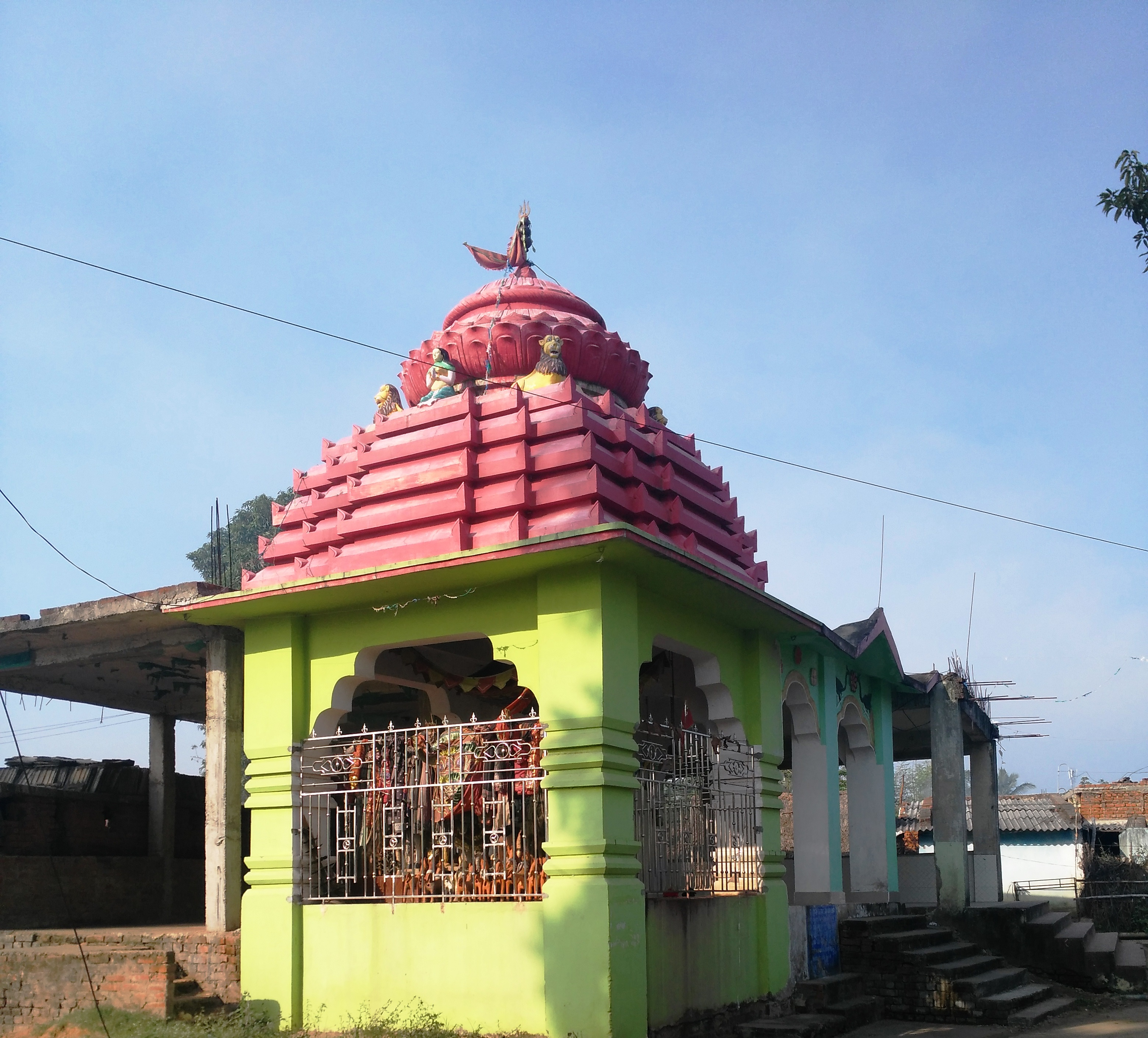
Mangala Temple Kulei

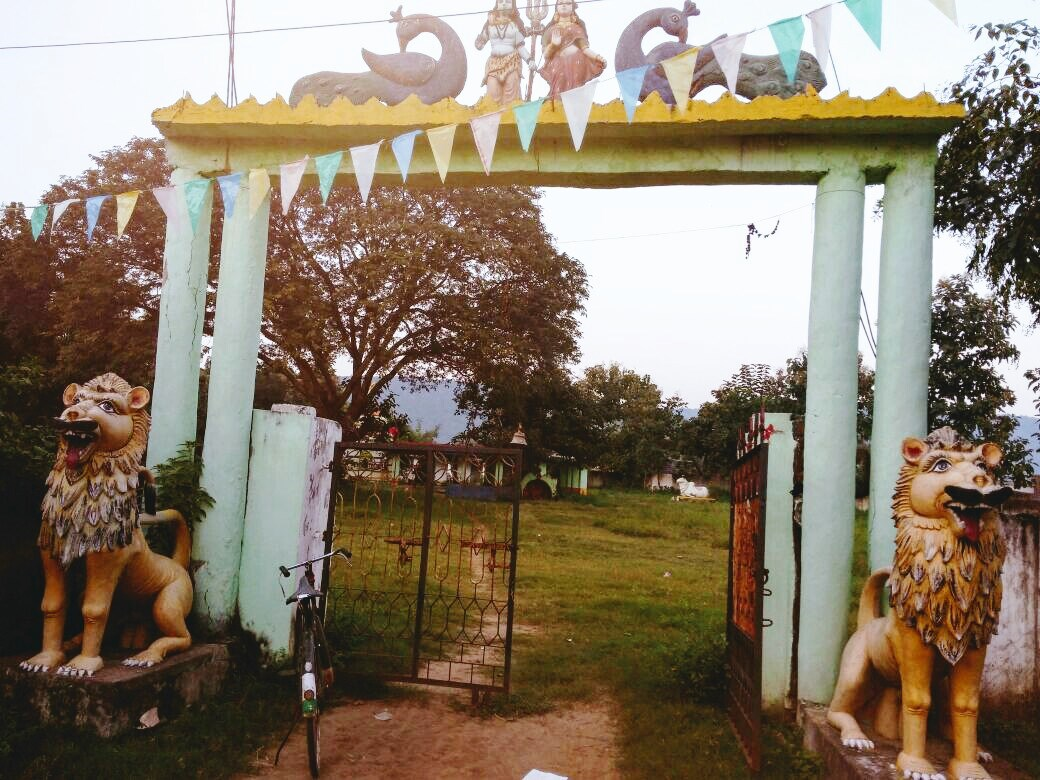
Kundheswar Temple Kulei

- Bramhani River
- Baba Kundheswar Temple

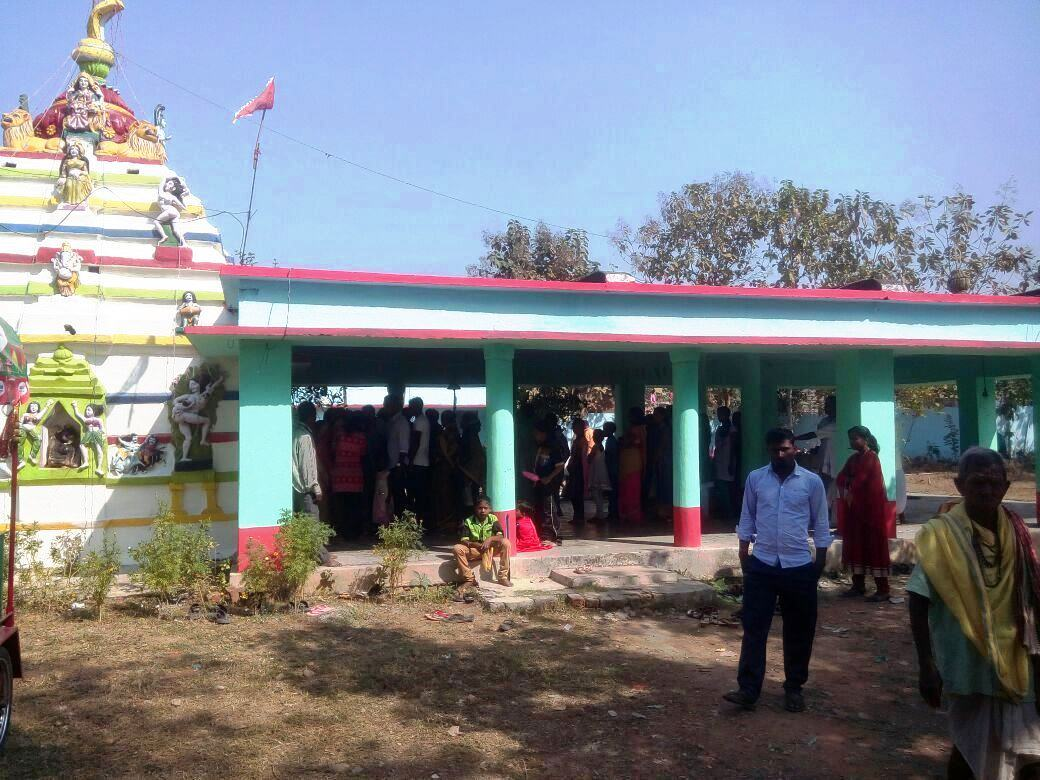
Baba Kundheswar Kulei

- Maa Mangala Temple
- Maa Tarini Temple
- Hanuman Statue
- Maa Santoshi Temple
- Sanidev Temple
- Samal barrage Dam
- OPCL Hydro electricity project

== Transport ==
=== Rail ===
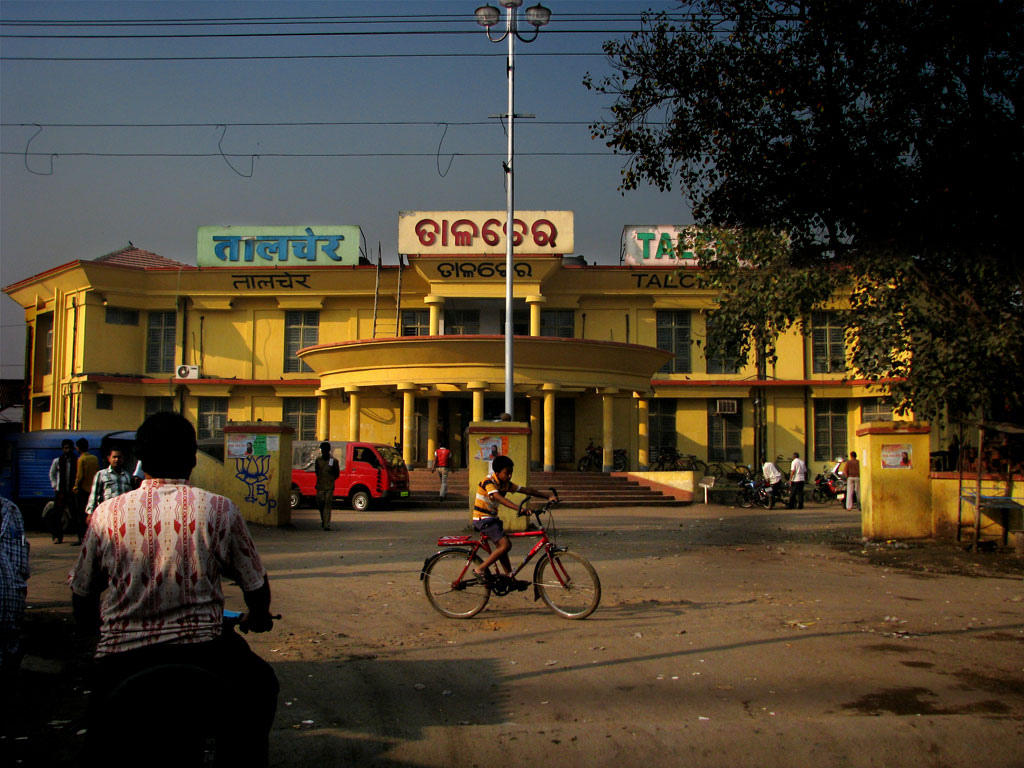
Talcher Railway Station

Nearest railway station is Talcher which is 18 km away from the village. New railway line between Talcher-Bimlagarh is passing through the village is under construction. After completion of the Talcher-Bimlagarh New BG line Samal Railway Station will be the nearest station with mere distance of 3 km.

=== Road ===
Village is well connected with Bhubaneswar, Cuttack, Rourkela and near by cities with bus service. NH 149 runs through the village and connect with Talcher and Palalahara and joins NH 55 at Banarpal to Cuttack and Bhubaneswar.

=== Local transport ===
Villagers use their personal vehicle for local transport. Taxi and auto rickshaw are available on rent for local transport.

== Gallery ==
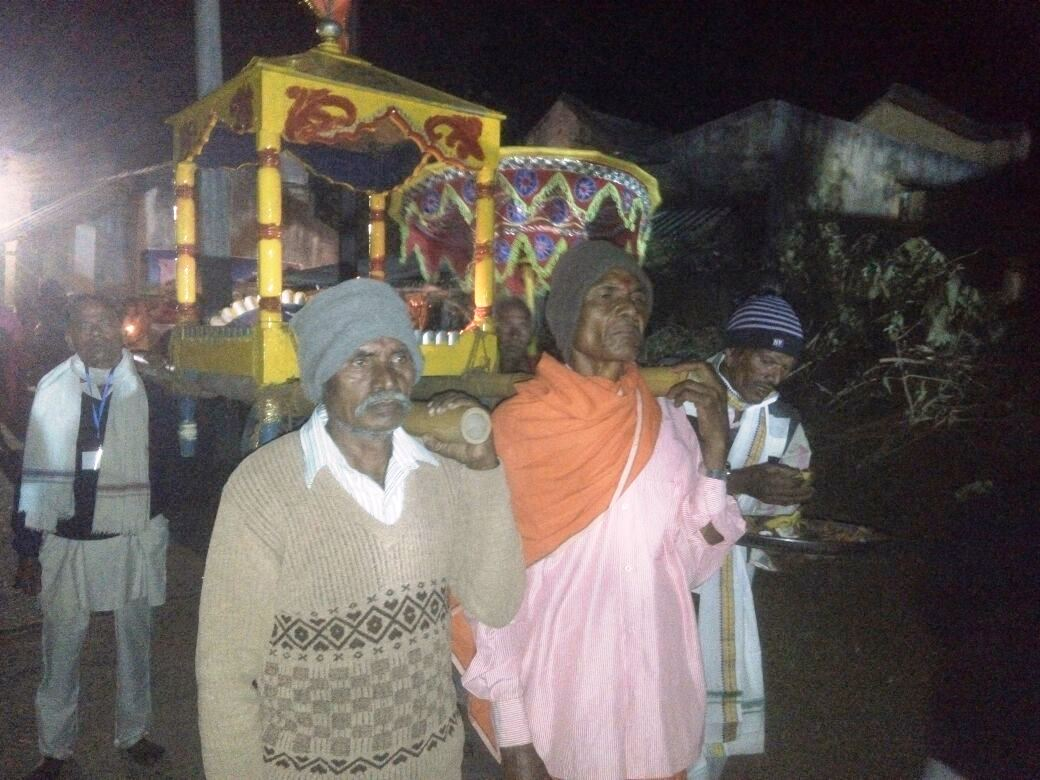
Makara Mela Kulei-1

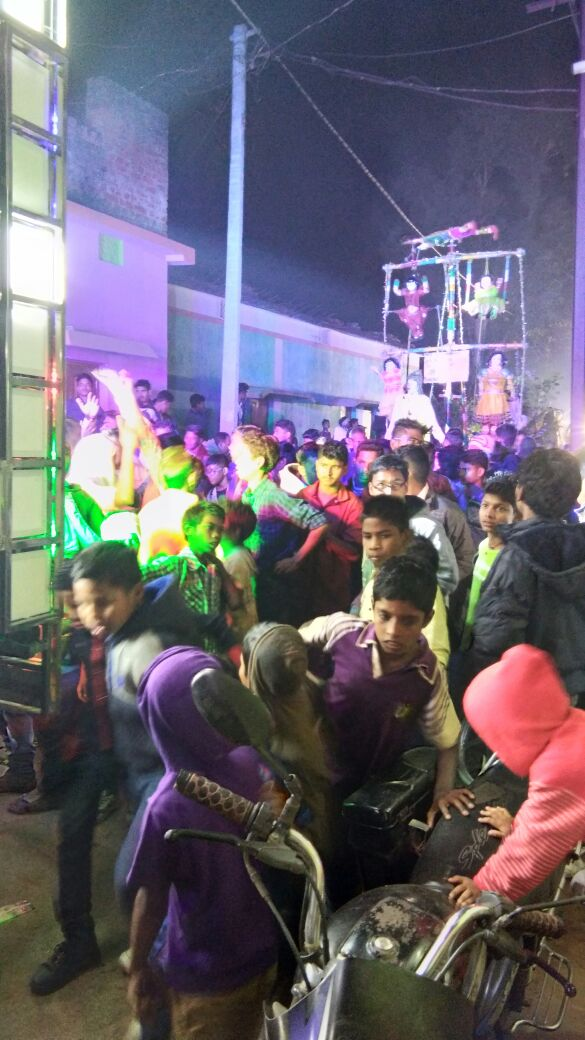
Makara Mela Kulei-2

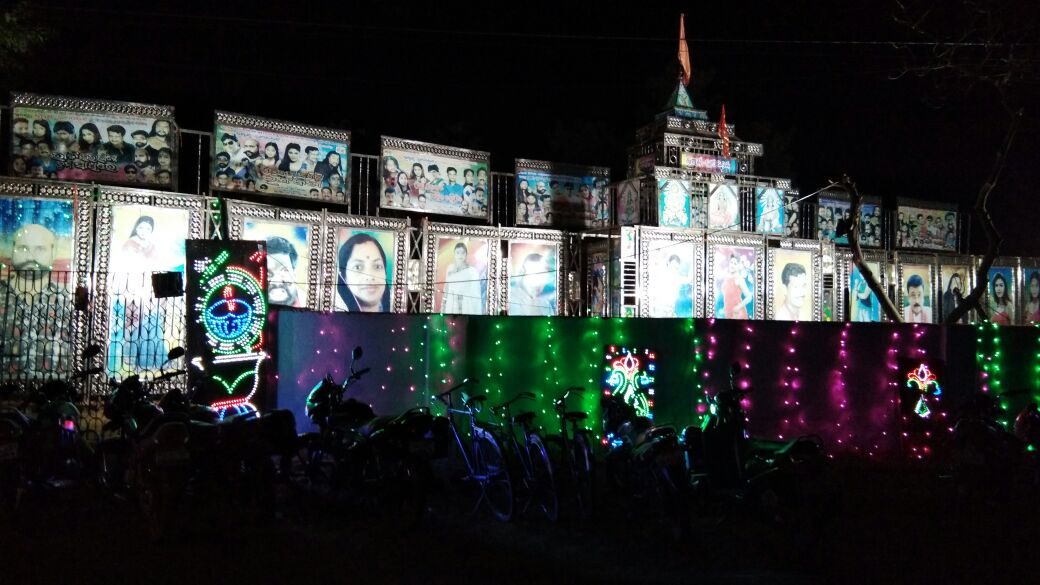
Makara Mela Kulei-3

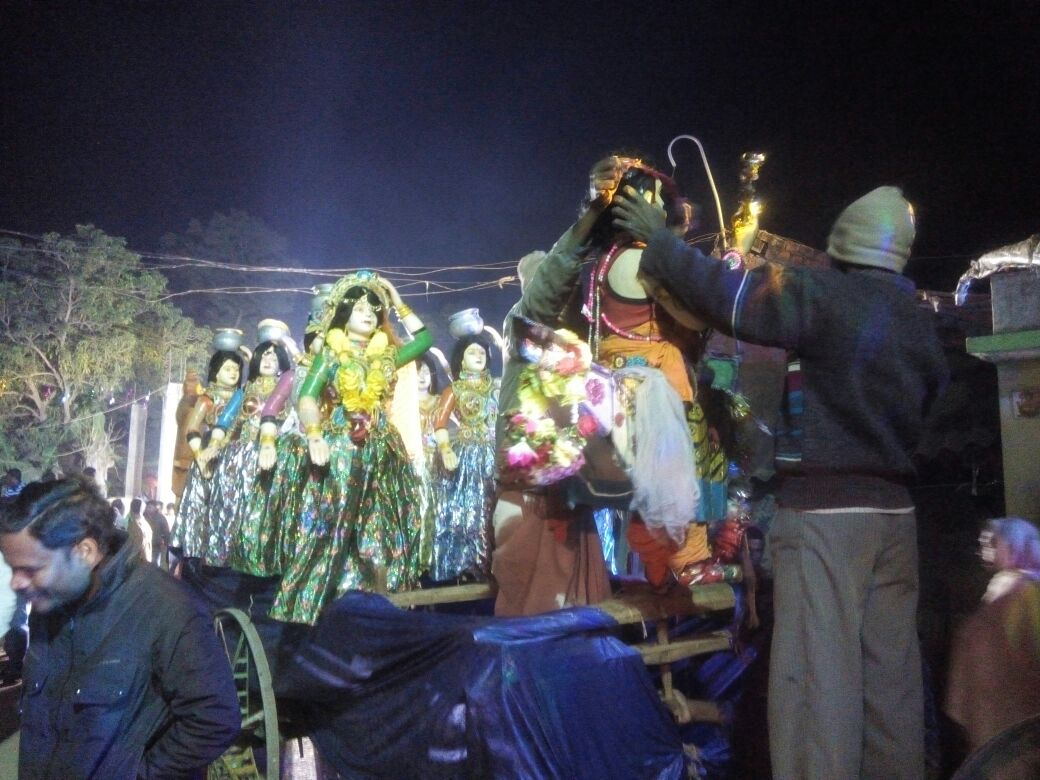
Makara Mela Kulei-4

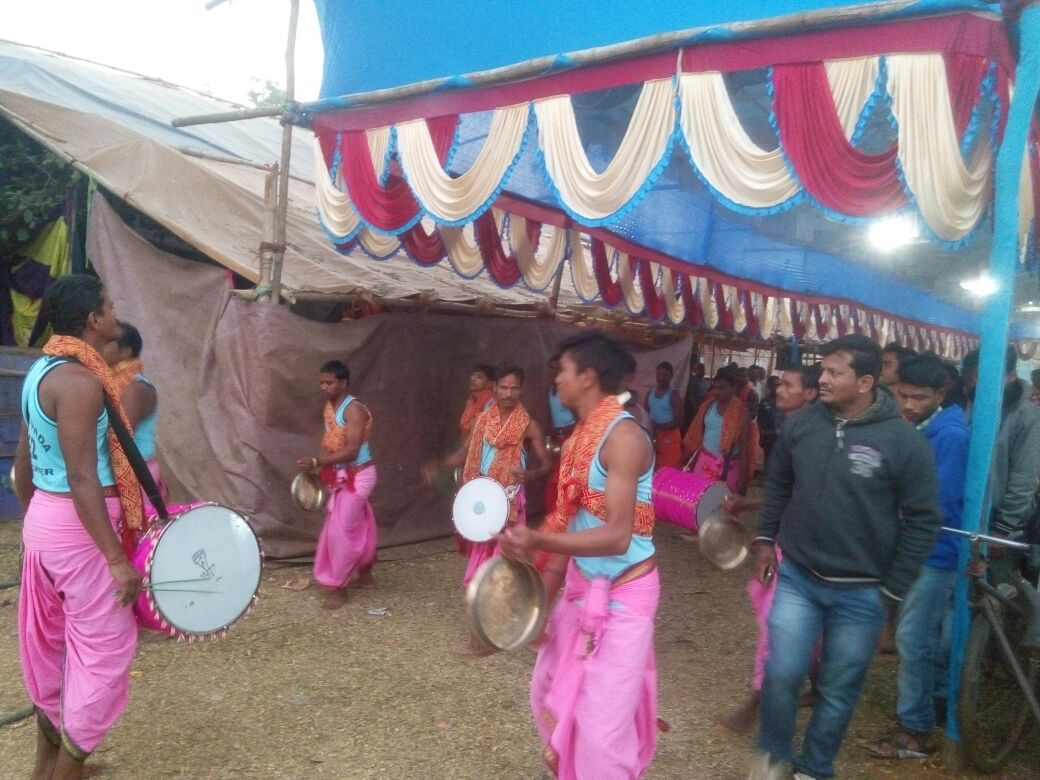
Makara Mela Kulei-5

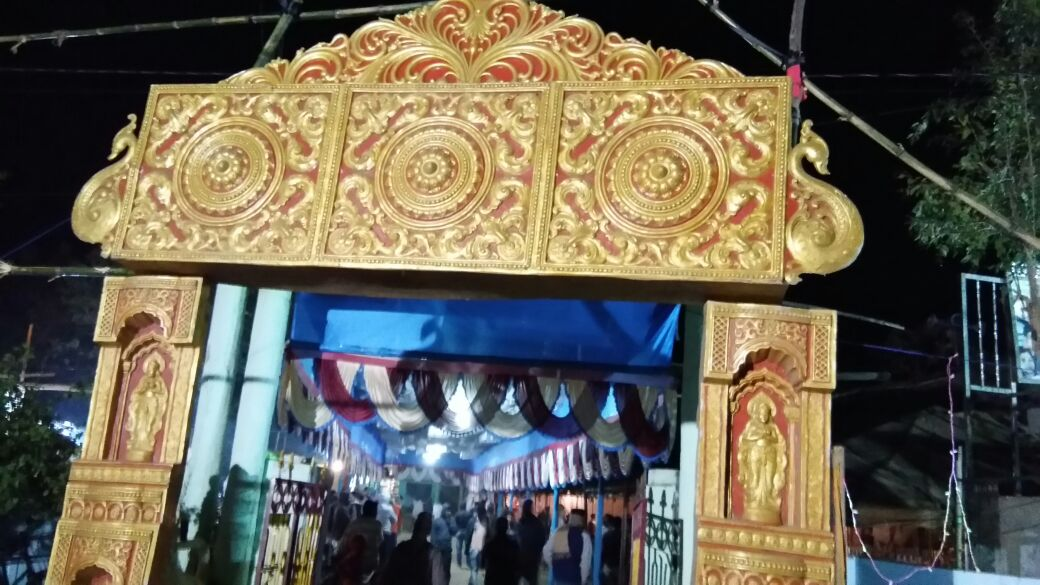
Makara Mela Kulei-6

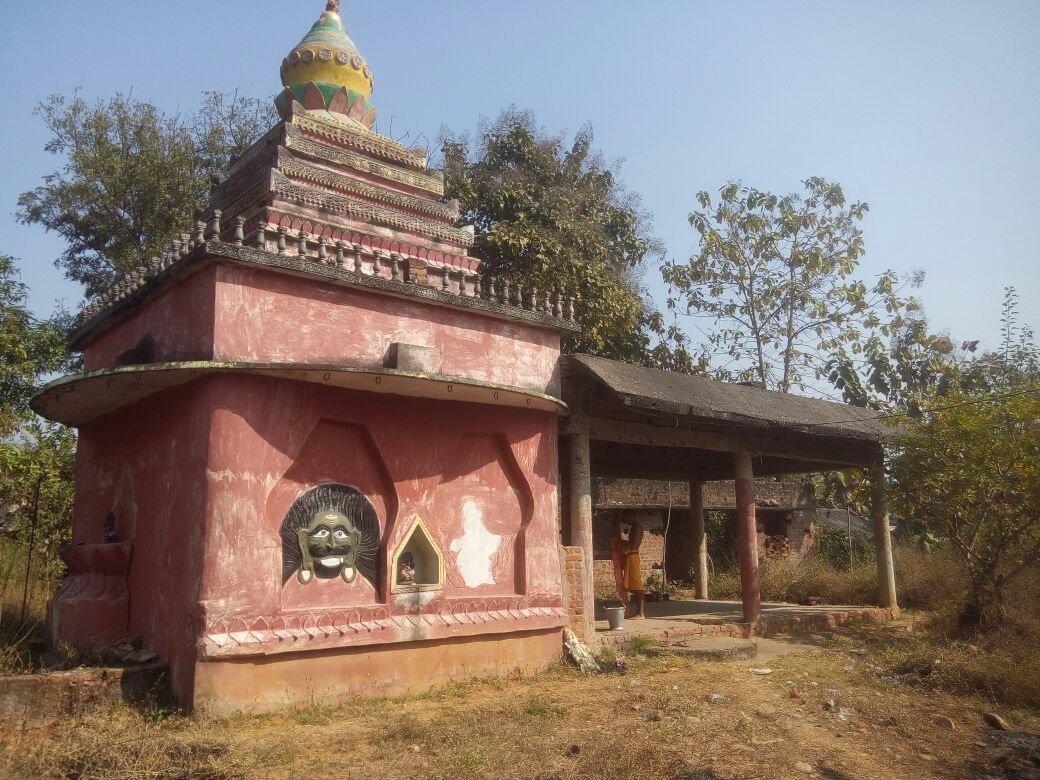
Maa Santoshi Kulei

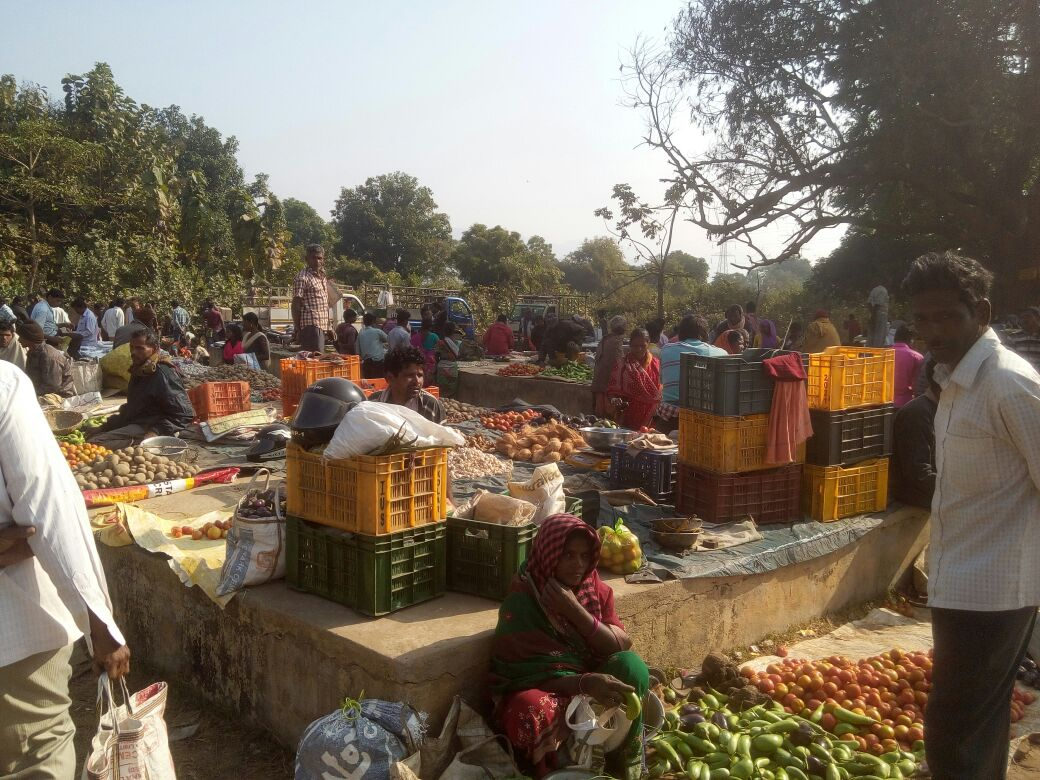
Kulei weekly Market

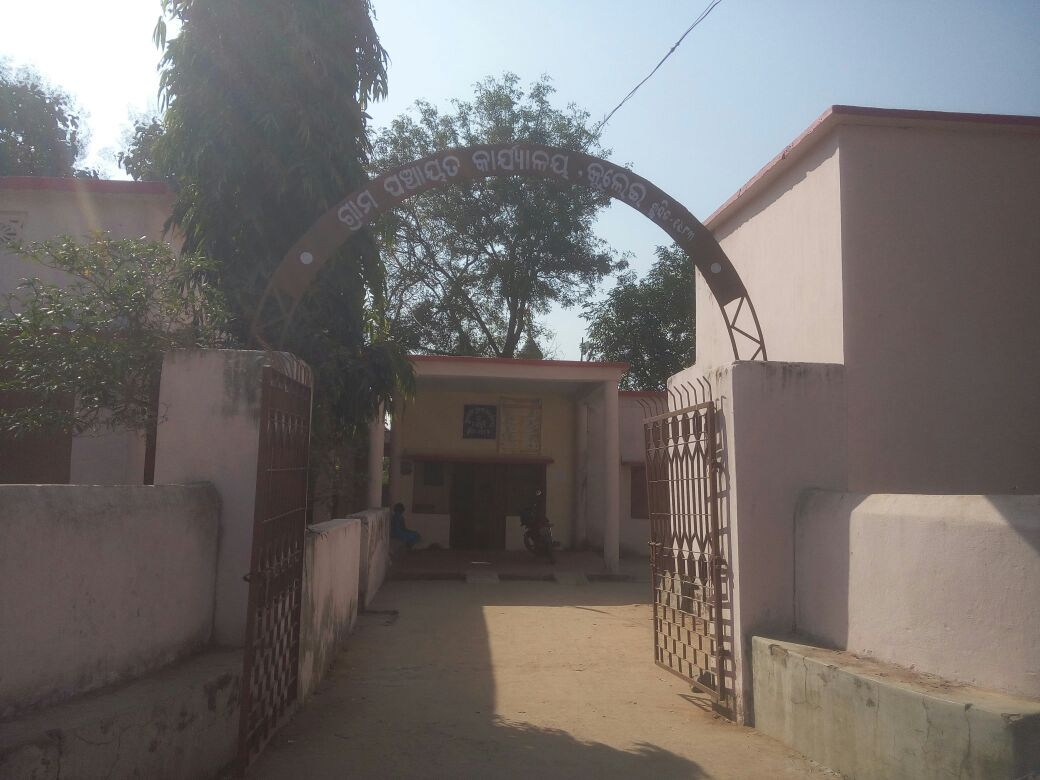
Kulei GP Office-1

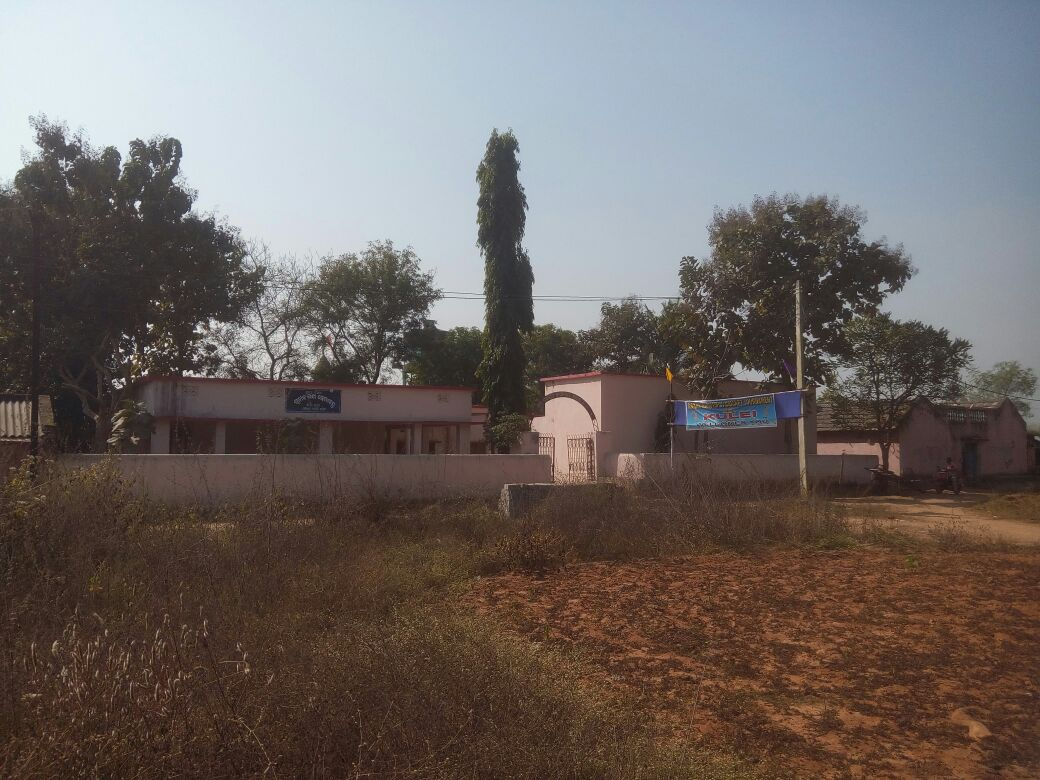
Kulei GP Office-2

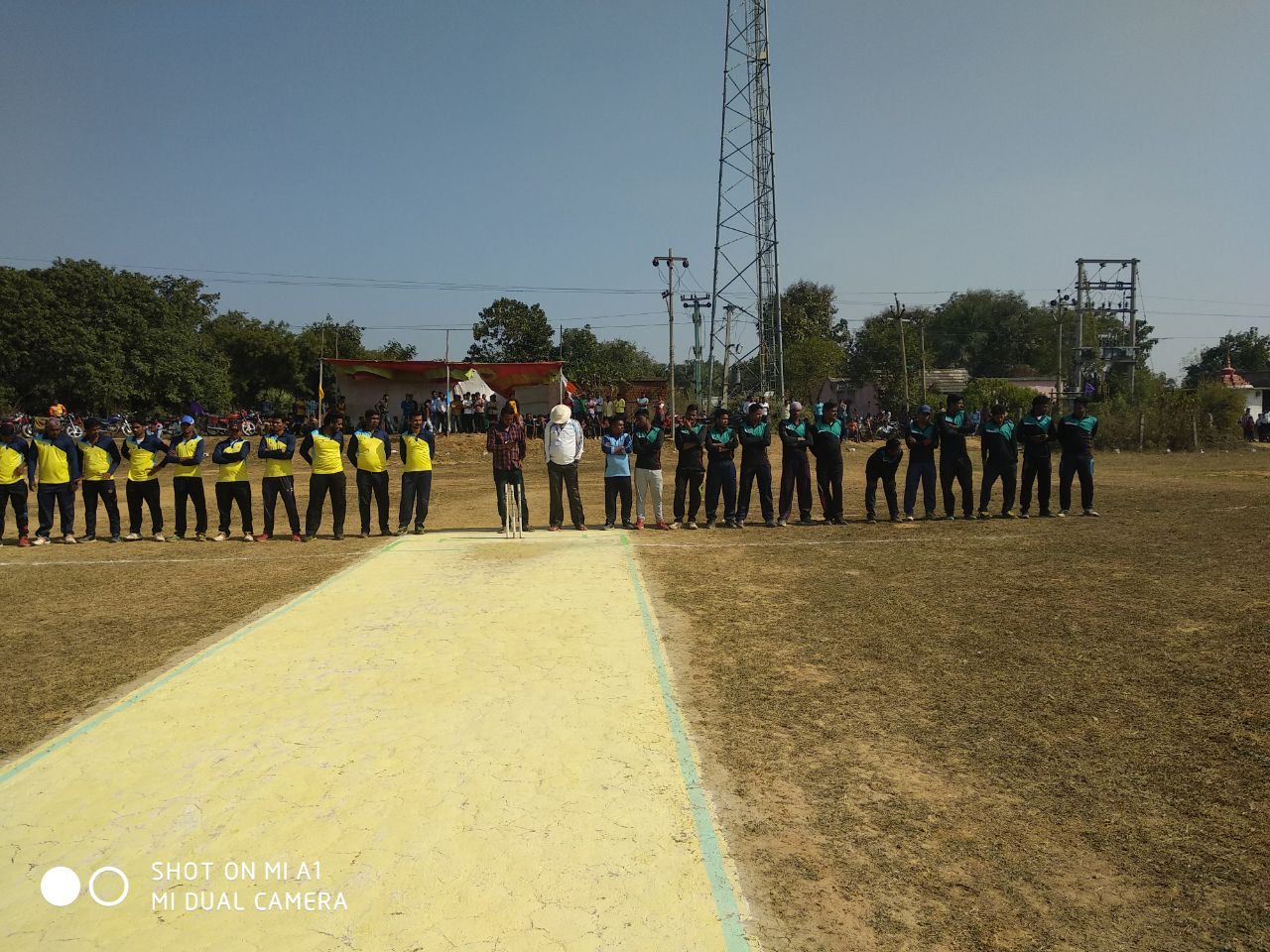
Cricket Tournament Kulei
