= Debendra Pradhan =

Indian politician (1941–2025)

Union Minister of State for Agriculture
- In office 27 May 2000 – 29 January 2003
- Prime Minister: Atal Bihari Vajpayee
- Preceded by: Thounaojam Chaoba Singh
- Succeeded by: Shripad Naik

Union Minister of State for Surface Transport
- In office 13 October 1999 – 27 May 2000
- Prime Minister: Atal Bihari Vajpayee
- Succeeded by: Hukumdev Narayan Yadav

Member of Parliament, Lok Sabha
- In office 5 March 1998 – 20 May 2004
- Preceded by: Sriballav Panigrahi
- Succeeded by: Dharmendra Pradhan
- Constituency: Deogarh, Odisha

Personal details
- Born: 16 July 1941 Nalam, Orissa Province, British India (present-day Odisha, India)
- Died: 17 March 2025 (aged 83) Delhi, India
- Party: Bharatiya Janata Party
- Spouse: Basanta Manjari Pradhan (m. 1966)
- Children: 2 (including Dharmendra Pradhan)
- Education: MBBS
- Alma mater: Srirama Chandra Bhanja Medical College and Hospital, Cuttack
- Profession: Agriculturist; medical practitioner; social worker

Debendra Pradhan (16 July 1941 – 17 March 2025) was an Indian politician and a member of the Bharatiya Janata Party, who served as minister of state for surface transport and agriculture in the Second Vajpayee ministry. He was elected to the 13th Lok Sabha from Deogarh constituency. He was also a member of the Rashtriya Swayamsevak Sangh. He is also the father of India's former education minister(9th) Dharmendra Pradhan.

== Background ==
Pradhan was born on 16 July 1941 in the undivided Dhenkanal District of Odisha and studied MBBS. His son Dharmendra Pradhan is a Loksabha MP from Sambalpur, Odisha and Union Minister of Education, Skill Development & Entrepreneurship in the Narendra Modi Government. He died in Delhi on 17 March 2025, at the age of 83.

== Offices ==
- President, BJP, Talcher Mandal (1980–1983)
- District President of undivided Dhenkanal District of BJP (1983–1985)
- District President of undivided Dhenkanal District of BJP (1985–1988)
- State President of BJP, Odisha (February 1988 – 1990)
- Re-elected as State President (BJP), Odisha (1990–1993)
- State General Secretary of BJP, Odisha (1993–1995)
- Re-elected as State President of BJP, Odisha (1995–1997)
- National Executive Member, BJP (1997–1998)
- Elected as Member of Parliament to 12th Lok Sabha, Deogarh Parliamentary Constituency, Odisha (1998)
- Union Minister of State for Surface Transport (1998–1999)
- Re-elected as Member of Parliament to 13th Lok Sabha, Deogarh Parliamentary Constituency (1999–2004)
- Union Minister of State, Surface Transport & Minister of State for Agriculture (1999–2001)
- National Vice President of BJP (2001–2002)
