= Rudra Narayan Pany =

Member of the Lok Sabha

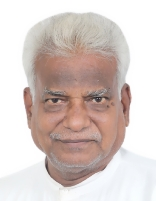
- Official Portrait

Member of Parliament, Lok Sabha
- Incumbent
- Assumed office 4 June 2024
- Preceded by: Mahesh Sahoo
- Constituency: Dhenkanal

Member of Parliament, Rajya Sabha
- In office 24 June 2004 – 3 April 2012
- Preceded by: Manmohan Samal
- Constituency: Odisha

Personal details
- Born: 22 April 1959 (age 66) Bolangir, Odisha
- Party: Bharatiya Janta Party
- Parents: Muralidhar Pany (father); Jambuvati Devi (mother)
- Education: Bachelor of Arts
- Alma mater: Utkal University
- Profession: Trade Unionist, Politician

Rudra Narayan Pany (born 22 April 1959) is an Indian politician of the Bharatiya Janata Party (BJP) and is a Member of the Parliament of India representing Dhenkanal in the Lok Sabha, the lower house of the Indian Parliament.
