= Ravi Narayan Pani =

Politician from Odisha, India

Member of Parliament, Lok Sabha
- In office 1989-1991
- Preceded by: Sriballav Panigrahi
- Succeeded by: Sriballav Panigrahi
- Constituency: Deogarh, Odisha

Personal details
- Born: 9 April 1950 (age 76) Bijigol, Dhenkanal District, Orissa
- Party: Janata Dal
- Spouse: Kiran Sundari Pani

Ravi Narayan Pani is an Indian politician. He was elected to the Lok Sabha, the lower house of the Parliament of India from Deogarh, Odisha as a member of the Janata Dal. Also elected to the Odisha Legislative Assembly, from Pallahara, Angul as a member of Biju Janta Dal.
