= Ashok Mohanty =

Indian politician

Member of Odisha Legislative Assembly
- Incumbent
- Assumed office 4 June 2024
- Preceded by: Mukesh Kumar Pal
- Constituency: Pallahara

Personal details
- Party: Bharatiya Janata Party
- Profession: Politician

Ashok Mohanty is an Indian politician. He was elected to the Odisha Legislative Assembly from Pallahara as a member of the Bharatiya Janata Party.
