= Baji Rout =

Indian revolutionary (1926–1938)

Shaheed Baji Rout, also known as Bajia
- ବାଜି ରାଉତ
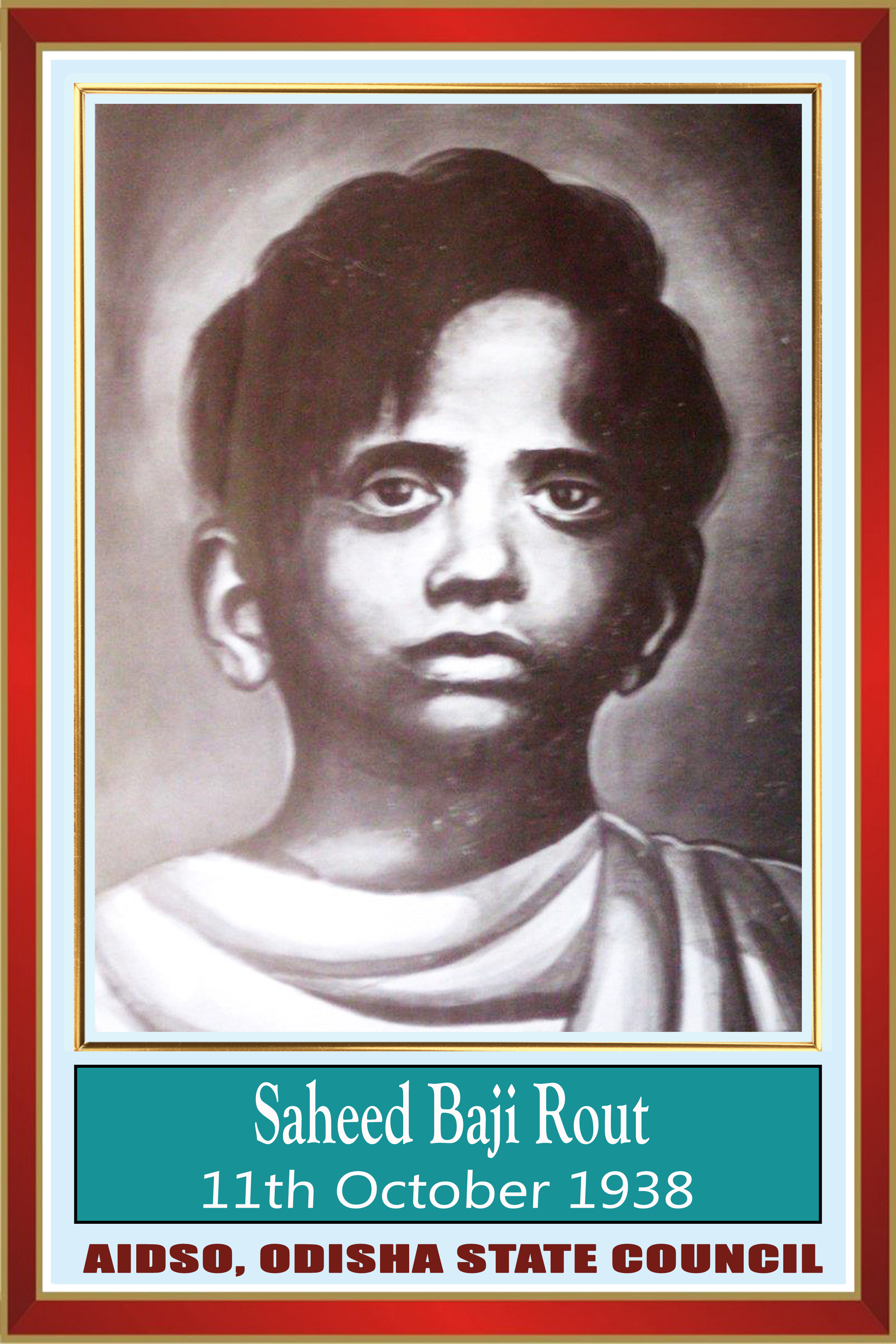
- Portrait of Shaheed Baji Rout
- Born: 5 October 1926; Nilakanthapur, Dhenkanal, Odisha
- Died: 11 October 1938 (aged 12); Nilakanthapur, Dhenkanal
- Cause of death: Gunshot wounds
- Other name: Bajia

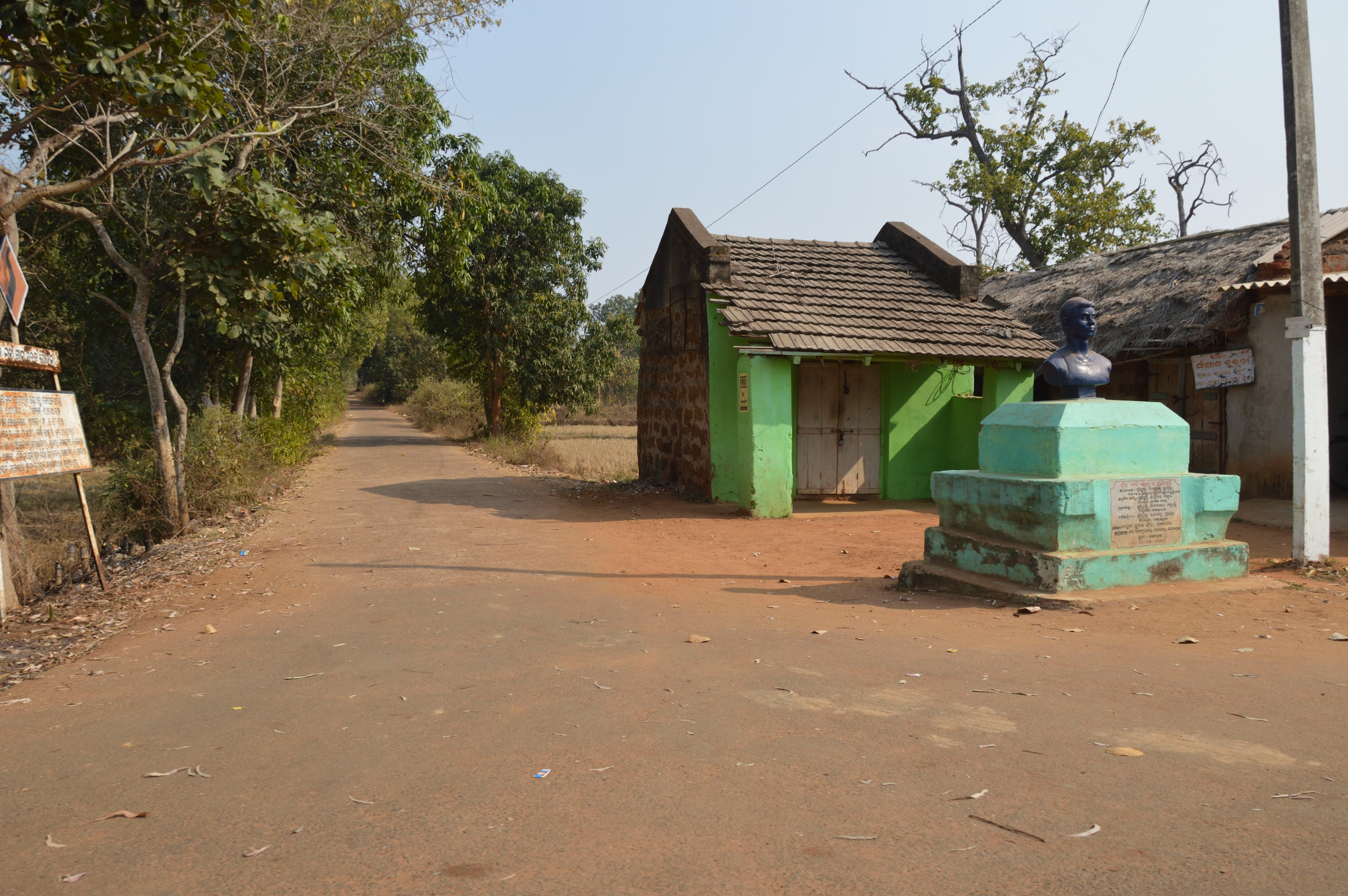
Baji Rout Junction

Baji Rout (Odia: ସହିଦ୍ ବାଜି ରାଉତ; 5 October 1926 – 11 October 1938) was an Indian boy of Odia origin, best known for his role in the Indian independence movement. Rout, who worked as a boatman, was shot by the Indian Imperial Police when he refused to ferry them across the Brahmani River on the night of 11 October 1938 at Nilakanthapur Ghat, Bhuban, Dhenkanal district.

Baji Rout was the youngest son of a boatman on the Brahmani river. As an active member of the Banar Sena of Prajamandal (Party of People), he had volunteered to keep watch by the river at night. The police ordered him to cross the river by his boat which he denied. The police then shot and killed Baji Rout. A large procession was held for him in Cuttack. His mortal remains were taken to 9, Pithapur (the then HQ of Legendary Shri. Bhagawati Charan Panigrahi) and then his cremation was held at Satichaura in Cuttack.

He was born on 5 October 1926 as the youngest son of Hari Rout and Rania Devi in the village Nilakanthapur in the then state of Dhenkanal. He lost his father in his childhood. His mother who was earning a living by grinding and husking paddy at a quern in the neighborhood was unable to spend anything on his education. He had two elder brothers who also earned very little to support the family.

== Legacy ==
=== Baji Rout Cup ===
On 3 November 2022, Union Education Minister Dharmendra Pradhan inaugurated a national level football tournament in honour of Baji Rout, which was won by Rajasthan United.

== Bibliography ==
Sachidananda Routray, Jnanpith Award winning poet has written a poem Baji Rout.

" ନୁହେଁ ବନ୍ଧୁ, ନୁହେଁ ଏହା ଚିତା , ଏ ଦେଶ ତିମିର ତଳେ ଏ ଅଲିଭା ମୁକତି ସଳିତା। "

"It is not a pyre, O Friends! When the country is in dark despair, it is the light of our liberty. It is our freedom-fire."

== Films ==
- "Baji Rout: India's Freedom Fighter", a documentary drama which portrays Rout's entire life journey as a freedom fighter and ultimately his encounter with the police. This Hindi short film was made by a group of students, directed by Riyyan Farooq and Diksha Nayak, produced by Candid Cinema.

Baji Rout poem in Odia-language by recited Ratnakar Sutar
