= Braja Kishore Pradhan =

Indian politician

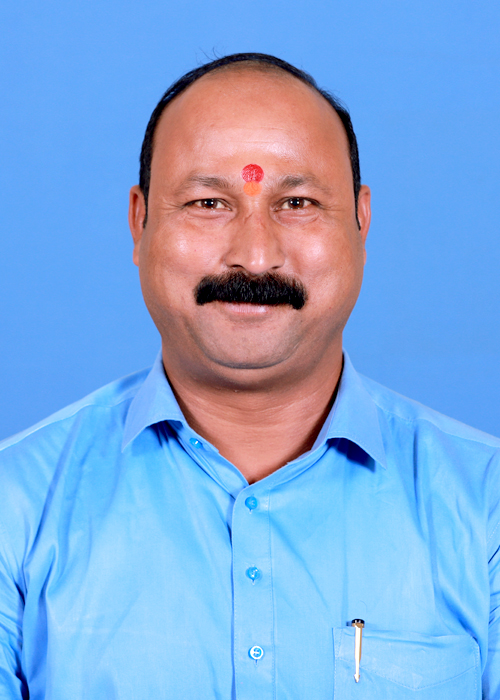

Member of Odisha Legislative Assembly
- Incumbent
- Assumed office 4 June 2024
- Preceded by: Braja Kishore Pradhan
- Constituency: Talcher

Personal details
- Party: Biju Janata Dal
- Profession: Politician

Braja Kishore Pradhan is an Indian politician who was elected to the Odisha Legislative Assembly from Talcher as a member of the Biju Janata Dal.
