= Bhuban =

- Town
- Location in Odisha, India Bhuban (India)
- Coordinates: 20.88°N 85.83°E
- Country: India
- State: Odisha
- District: Dhenkanal
- Elevation: 64 m (210 ft)

Languages
  - Official: Odia
  - Major local language: Ho language
- Time zone: UTC+5:30 (IST)
- PIN: 759017
- Vehicle registration: OD
- Website: odisha.gov.in

Bhuban is a town and a NAC, located in the subdivision of Kamakhyanagar, Dhenkanal district in the state of Odisha, India.

== Demographics ==
As of 2011 India census, Bhuban had a population of 22,200. Males constitute 52% of the population and females 48%. Bhuban has an average literacy rate of 75%, just higher than the national average of 74%; with male literacy of 80.6% and female literacy of 69%. 10.22% of the population is under 6 years of age.

== Geography ==
Bhuban is located at 20.88°N 85.83°E. It has an average elevation of 64 metres (209 feet). Bhuban is around 90 km from all the leading power plants, Kaniha NTPC and Talcher NTPC, and the industrial hub of Angul.

== Notable people ==
- Baji Rout (born in 1925, martyred 10 October 1938), "the youngest martyr" of India.
