= Prafulla Kumar Mallik =

Indian politician

Member of Odisha Legislative Assembly
- In office 2004–2024
- Preceded by: Brahmananda Biswal
- Constituency: Kamakhyanagar

Personal details
- Political party: Biju Janata Dal (till 2025)
- Profession: Politician

Prafulla Kumar Mallik is an Indian politician from Odisha. He was a four time elected Member of the Odisha Legislative Assembly from 2004, 2009, 2014, and 2019, representing Kamakshyanagar Assembly constituency as a Member of the Biju Janata Dal.

== See also ==
- 2019 Odisha Legislative Assembly election
- Odisha Legislative Assembly
