= Kamakhyanagar =

- Town
- Location in Odisha, India Kamakhyanagar (India)
- Coordinates: 20.93°N 85.55°E
- Country: India
- State: Odisha
- District: Dhenkanal
- Elevation: 66 m (217 ft)

Population
  - Total: 16,810

Languages
  - Official: Odia
- Time zone: UTC+5:30 (IST)
- PIN: 759018
- Telephone code: 06769
- Vehicle registration: OD-06
- Website: odisha.gov.in

Kamakhyanagar is a town (NAC) and a subdivision in the Dhenkanal district in the Indian state of Odisha. It is located 37 km north of Dhenkanal.

== Demographics ==
As of 2011 India census, Kamakhyanagar had a population of 16,810. Males constitute 53% of the population and females 47%. Kamakhyanagar has an average literacy rate of 73%, higher than the national average of 59.5%. Male literacy in the city is 81%, and female literacy is 65%. In Kamakhyanagar, 11% of the population is under 6 years of age.

== Politics ==
The current MLA from Kamakhyanagar Assembly Constituency is Sj. Satrughan Jena of BJP, who won the seat in the State elections of 2024. Previous MLAs from this seat were: Subrat Biswal of BJD who won in 2004, 2009, 2015 and 2019. Brahmananda Biswal of BJD in 2000, Kailash Chandra Mohapatra who won in 1995 as INC and as INC(I) candidate in 1980, and Prasanna Kumar Pattanayak who won as JD candidate in 1990 and as BJP candidate in 1985 and as JNP candidate in 1977 .

Kamakhyanagar is part of Dhenkanal (Lok Sabha constituency).

== See also ==
- Dhenkanal District
- Dhenkanal
- Dhenkanal (princely state)
