= Mahesh Sahoo =

Indian politician

- Mahesh Sahoo MP Dhenkanal Constituency

Member of Indian Parliament (Lok Sabha) for Dhenkanal
- In office 23 May 2019 – 4 June 2024
- Preceded by: Tathagata Satapathy
- Succeeded by: Rudra Narayan Pany
- Constituency: Dhenkanal

Personal details
- Born: Talcher, Angul, Odisha
- Party: Biju Janata Dal
- Spouse: Smt. Nandita Behera
- Parent(s): Nabaghan Sahoo (Father), Netramani Sahoo (Mother)
- Education: Talcher College
- Profession: Politician

Mahesh Sahoo is an Indian politician. He was elected to the Lok Sabha, lower house of the Parliament of India from Dhenkanal, Odisha in the 2019 Indian general election as a member of the Biju Janata Dal.
