= 16th Odisha Legislative Assembly =

16th state legislature of the Indian state of Odisha

←	15th Assembly	17th Assembly	→
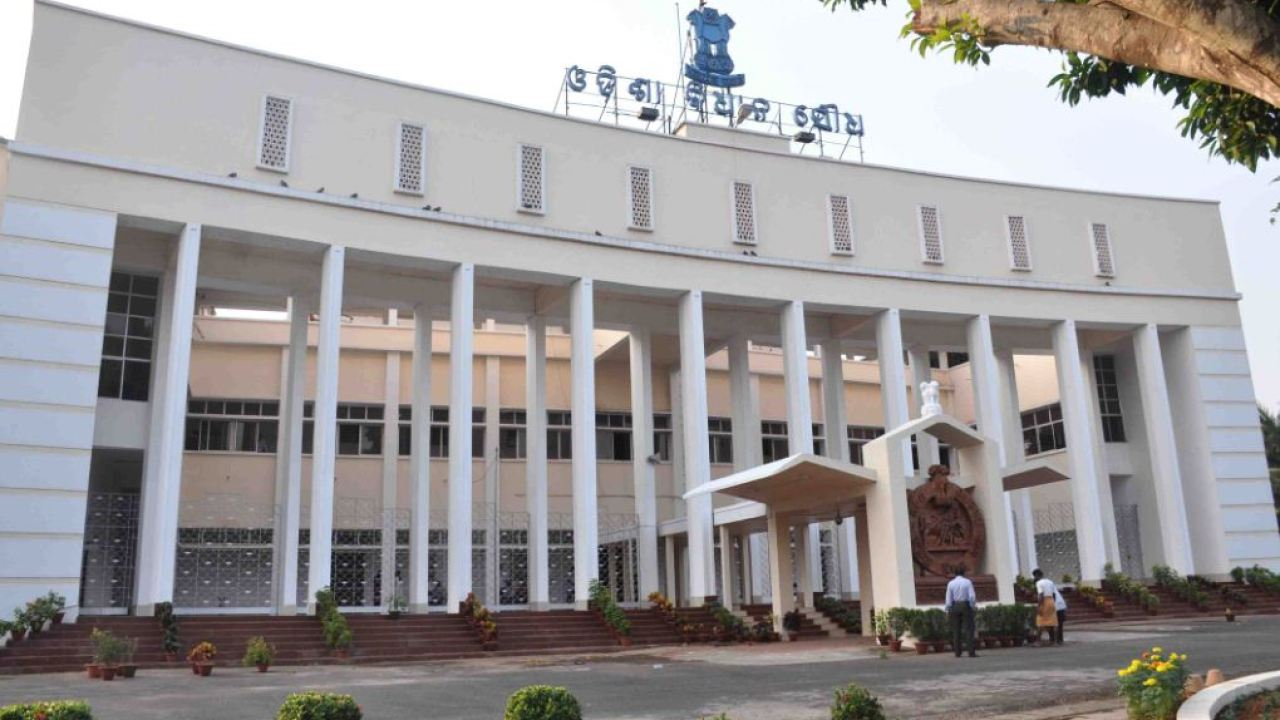
- Front view of Odisha Vidhan Saudha, Bhubaneshwar (2010)

Overview
- Meeting place: Odisha Vidhan Saudha, Bhubaneshwar, Odisha, India
- Term: 25 May 2019 – 3 June 2024
- Election: 2019 Odisha Legislative Assembly election
- Government: Biju Janata Dal
- Opposition: Bharatiya Janata Party
- Website: assembly.odisha.gov.in

Odisha Legislative Assembly
- House Composition as on 2023
- Members: 147
- Governor: Ganeshi Lal; Raghubar Das
- Speaker: Surjya Narayan Patro, BJD; Bikram Keshari Arukha, BJD; Pramila Mallik, BJD
- Deputy Speaker: Rajanikant Singh, BJD; Saluga Pradhan, BJD
- Leader of the House (Chief Minister): Naveen Patnaik, BJD
- Leader of Opposition: Pradipta Kumar Naik, BJP; Jayanarayan Mishra, BJP
- Party control: BJD (112/147)
- 15 Sessions with 184 Sittings

The Sixteenth Odisha Legislative Assembly was convened on after 2019 Odisha Legislative Assembly election. Biju Janata Dal led by Naveen Patnaik formed government for a record 5th time.

== Brief history ==
Following BJD's victory in 2019 election, Chief Minister Naveen Patnaik along with his council of ministers were sworn in by Governor Ganeshi Lal on 29 May 2019. Entire cabinet was reshuffled on 5 June 2022 & expanded on 22 May 2023. After a major upset for BJD in 2024 Odisha Assembly election, Shri Patnaik submitted his resignation to Governor on 4 June 2024, paving way for new BJP govt. He continued as Caretaker CM till 12 June 2024. The house got its first women speaker as Smt Pramila Mallik was elected unopposed on 22 September 2023.

== House composition ==
Party	Strength	
Party	Assembly Begins	Assembly Dissolves
Biju Janata Dal	112	108
Bharatiya Janata Party	23	22
Indian National Congress	9	9
Communist Party of India (Marxist)	1	1
Independent	1	4
Vacant	1	3

== Office bearers ==
Post	Portrait	Name	Tenure		Party
Governor		Ganeshi Lal	Assembly Begins	30 October 2023	N/A
Governor		Raghubar Das	31 October 2023	Assembly Dissolves	N/A
Speaker		Surjya Narayan Patro; MLA from Digapahandi	1 June 2019	4 June 2022	Biju Janata Dal
Speaker		Bikram Keshari Arukha; MLA from Bhanjanagar	13 June 2022	12 May 2023	Biju Janata Dal
Speaker		Pramila Mallik; MLA from Binjharpur	22 September 2023	4 June 2024	Biju Janata Dal
Deputy Speaker		Rajanikant Singh; MLA from Angul	27 June 2019	8 November 2023	Biju Janata Dal
Deputy Speaker		Saluga Pradhan; MLA from G. Udayagiri	21 November 2023	5 June 2024	Biju Janata Dal
Leader of the House (Chief Minister); Leader of BJD Legislature Party		Naveen Patnaik; MLA from Hinjili	29 May 2019	11 June 2024	Biju Janata Dal
Minister for Parliamentary Affairs		Bikram Keshari Arukha; MLA from Bhanjanagar	29 May 2019	5 June 2022	Biju Janata Dal
Minister for Parliamentary Affairs		Niranjan Pujari; MLA from Sonepur	5 June 2022	11 June 2024	Biju Janata Dal
Leader of Opposition Leader of BJP Legislature Party		Pradipta Kumar Naik; MLA from Bhawanipatna	5 June 2019	30 July 2022	Bharatiya Janata Party
Leader of Opposition Leader of BJP Legislature Party		Jayanarayan Mishra; MLA from Sambalpur	30 July 2022	5 June 2024	Bharatiya Janata Party
Leader of Congress Legislature Party		Narasingha Mishra; MLA from Bolangir	5 June 2019	5 June 2024	Indian National Congress
Pro tem Speaker		Amar Prasad Satpathy; MLA from Barchana	29 May 2019	31 May 2019	Biju Janata Dal

== Council of Ministers ==
Source
Portfolio	Portrait	Name Constituency	Tenure		Party
Chief Minister; Home; General Administration & Public Grievance; Other departments not allocated to any Minister.		Naveen Patnaik; MLA from Hinjili	29 May 2019	11 June 2024	BJD
Cabinet Minister
Excise		Niranjan Pujari; MLA from Sonepur	29 May 2019	5 June 2022	BJD
Finance		Niranjan Pujari; MLA from Sonepur	29 May 2019	22 May 2023	BJD
Finance		Bikram Keshari Arukha; MLA from Bhanjanagar	22 May 2023	11 June 2024	BJD
Steel & Mines; Works		Prafulla Kumar Mallik; MLA from Kamakshyanagar	29 May 2019	11 June 2024	BJD
Health & Family Welfare		Naba Kishore Das; MLA from Jharsuguda	29 May 2019	14 February 2023	BJD
Health & Family Welfare		Niranjan Pujari; MLA from Sonepur	14 February 2023	11 June 2024	BJD
Agriculture & Farmers Empowerment; Fisheries & Animal Resources Development		Arun Kumar Sahoo; MLA from Nayagarh	29 May 2019	5 June 2022	BJD
Agriculture & Farmers Empowerment; Fisheries & Animal Resources Development		Ranendra Pratap Swain; MLA from Athagarh	5 June 2022	11 June 2024	BJD
Law		Pratap Jena; MLA from Mahanga	29 May 2019	5 June 2022	BJD
Law		Jagannath Saraka; MLA from Bissam Cuttack	5 June 2022	11 June 2024	BJD
S.T. & S.C. Development, Minorities & Backward Classes Welfare		Jagannath Saraka; MLA from Bissam Cuttack	5 June 2022	11 June 2024	BJD
Planning & Convergence		Padmanabha Behera; MLA from Birmaharajpur	29 May 2019	5 June 2022	BJD
Planning & Convergence		Rajendra Dholakia; MLA from Nuapada	5 June 2022	11 June 2024	BJD
Higher Education		Arun Kumar Sahoo; MLA from Nayagarh	29 May 2019	5 June 2022	BJD
Higher Education		Atanu Sabyasachi Nayak; MLA from Mahakalapada	9 June 2023	11 June 2024	BJD
Parliamentary Affairs		Bikram Keshari Arukha; MLA from Bhanjanagar	29 May 2019	5 June 2022	BJD
Parliamentary Affairs		Niranjan Pujari; MLA from Sonepur	5 June 2022	11 June 2024	BJD
Forest & Environment and Climate Change		Bikram Keshari Arukha; MLA from Bhanjanagar	29 May 2019	5 June 2022	BJD
Forest & Environment and Climate Change		Pradip Kumar Amat; MLA from Boudh	5 June 2022	11 June 2024	BJD
Panchayati Raj & Drinking Water		Pratap Jena; MLA from Mahanga	29 May 2019	5 June 2022	BJD
Panchayati Raj & Drinking Water		Pradip Kumar Amat; MLA from Boudh	5 June 2022	11 June 2024	BJD
Information & Public Relations		Pradip Kumar Amat; MLA from Boudh	5 June 2022	11 June 2024	BJD
Housing & Urban Development		Pratap Jena; MLA from Mahanga	29 May 2019	5 June 2022	BJD
Housing & Urban Development		Usha Devi; MLA from Chikiti	5 June 2022	11 June 2024	BJD
School & Mass Education		Sudam Marndi; MLA from Bangriposi	22 May 2023	11 June 2024	BJD
Revenue & Disaster Management		Sudam Marndi; MLA from Bangriposi	29 May 2019	5 June 2022	BJD
Revenue & Disaster Management		Pramila Mallik; MLA from Binjharpur	5 June 2022	21 September 2022	BJD
Revenue & Disaster Management		Ashok Chandra Panda; MLA from Ekamra-Bhubaneswar	21 September 2022	11 June 2024	BJD
Social Security & Empowerment of Persons with Disability; Science & Technology; Public Enterprises		Ashok Chandra Panda; MLA from Ekamra-Bhubaneswar	5 June 2022	11 June 2024	BJD
Co-operation; Food Supplies & Consumer Welfare		Ranendra Pratap Swain; MLA from Athagarh	29 May 2019	5 June 2022	BJD
Co-operation; Food Supplies & Consumer Welfare		Atanu Sabyasachi Nayak; MLA from Mahakalapada	5 June 2022	11 June 2024	BJD
Commerce and Transport		Padmanabha Behera; MLA from Birmaharajpur	29 May 2019	5 June 2022	BJD
Commerce and Transport		Tukuni Sahu; MLA from Titlagarh	5 June 2022	11 June 2024	BJD
Water Resources		Tukuni Sahu; MLA from Titlagarh	5 June 2022	11 June 2024	BJD
Women & Child Development; Mission Shakti		Tukuni Sahu; MLA from Titlagarh	29 May 2019	5 June 2022	BJD
Energy; Industries; Micro, Small & Medium Enterprises		Pratap Keshari Deb; MLA from Aul	5 June 2022	11 June 2024	BJD
Rural Development		Susanta Singh; MLA from Bhatli	29 May 2019	5 June 2022	BJD
Labour & Employees' State Insurance		Susanta Singh; MLA from Bhatli	29 May 2019	5 June 2022	BJD
Labour & Employees' State Insurance		Srikanta Sahu; MLA from Polasara	5 June 2022	22 May 2023	BJD
Labour & Employees' State Insurance		Sarada Prashad Nayak; MLA from Rourkela	22 May 2023	11 June 2024	BJD
Ministers of State with Independent Charges
S.T. & S.C. Development, Minorities & Backward Classes Welfare		Jagannath Saraka; MLA from Bissam Cuttack	29 May 2019	5 June 2022	BJD
Social Security & Empowerment of Persons with Disability; Science & Technology; Public Enterprises		Ashok Chandra Panda; MLA from Ekamra Bhubaneswar	29 May 2019	5 June 2022	BJD
Electronics & Information Technology; Sports & Youth Services		Tusharkanti Behera; MLA from Kakatpur	29 May 2019	11 June 2024	BJD
School & Mass Education		Samir Ranjan Dash; MLA from Nimapara	29 May 2019	22 May 2023	BJD
Information & Public Relations; Water Resources		Raghunandan Das; MLA from Balikuda-Erasama	29 May 2019	5 June 2022	BJD
Energy; Industries; Micro, Small & Medium Enterprises		Dibya Shankar Mishra; MLA from Junagarh	29 May 2019	5 June 2022	BJD
Odia Language, Literature & Culture; Tourism		Jyoti Prakash Panigrahi; MLA from Simulia	29 May 2019	5 June 2022	BJD
Odia Language, Literature & Culture; Tourism		Aswini Kumar Patra; MLA from Jaleswar	5 June 2022	11 June 2024	BJD
Excise		Aswini Kumar Patra; MLA from Jaleswar	5 June 2022	11 June 2024	BJD
Skill Development & Technical Education		Premananda Nayak; MLA from Telkoi	29 May 2019	5 June 2022	BJD
Skill Development & Technical Education		Pritiranjan Gharai; MLA from Sukinda	5 June 2022	11 June 2024	BJD
Rural Development		Pritiranjan Gharai; MLA from Sukinda	5 June 2022	11 June 2024	BJD
Handlooms, Textiles & Handicrafts		Padmini Dian; MLA from Kotpad	29 May 2019	5 June 2022	BJD
Handlooms, Textiles & Handicrafts		Rita Sahu; MLA from Bijepur	5 June 2022	11 June 2024	BJD
Women & Child Development; Mission Shakti		Basanti Hembram; MLA from Karanjia	5 June 2022	11 June 2024	BJD
Higher Education		Rohit Pujari; MLA from Rairakhol	5 June 2022	9 June 2023	BJD
Ministers of State
Home		Dibya Shankar Mishra; MLA from Junagarh	29 May 2019	5 June 2022	BJD
Home		Tusharkanti Behera; MLA from Kakatpur	5 June 2022	11 June 2024	BJD

== Members of Legislative Assembly ==
Source
District	Ac. No.	Constituency	Name	Party	Remarks
Bargarh	1	Padampur	Bijaya Ranjan Singh Bariha	Biju Janata Dal	Died in October 2022.
Bargarh	1	Padampur	Barsha Singh Bariha	Biju Janata Dal	Won in December 2022 Bypoll.
Bargarh	2	Bijepur	Naveen Patnaik	Biju Janata Dal	Elected from 2 seats. Resigned
Bargarh	2	Bijepur	Rita Sahu	Biju Janata Dal	Minister of State (I/C)
Bargarh	3	Bargarh	Debesh Acharya	Biju Janata Dal	
Bargarh	4	Attabira (SC)	Snehangini Chhuria	Biju Janata Dal	
Bargarh	5	Bhatli	Susanta Singh	Biju Janata Dal	Cabinet Minister
Jharsuguda	6	Brajarajnagar	Kishore Kumar Mohanty	Biju Janata Dal	Died in December 2021.
Jharsuguda	6	Brajarajnagar	Alka Mohanty	Biju Janata Dal	Won in June 2022 Bypoll.
Jharsuguda	7	Jharsuguda	Naba Kishore Das	Biju Janata Dal	Cabinet Minister, Assassinated in January 2023.
Jharsuguda	7	Jharsuguda	Dipali Das	Biju Janata Dal	Won in 2023 Bypoll.
Sundargarh	8	Talsara (ST)	Bhabani Shankar Bhoi	Bharatiya Janata Party	
Sundargarh	9	Sundargarh (ST)	Kusum Tete	Bharatiya Janata Party	
Sundargarh	10	Biramitrapur (ST)	Shankar Oram	Bharatiya Janata Party	
Sundargarh	11	Raghunathpali (SC)	Subrat Tarai	Biju Janata Dal	
Sundargarh	12	Rourkela	Sarada Prasad Nayak	Biju Janata Dal	Cabinet Minister
Sundargarh	13	Rajgangpur (ST)	C. S. Razeen Ekka	Indian National Congress	
Sundargarh	14	Bonai (ST)	Laxman Munda	Communist Party of India	
Sambalpur	15	Kuchinda (ST)	Kishore Chandra Naik	Biju Janata Dal	
Sambalpur	16	Rengali (SC)	Nauri Nayak	Bharatiya Janata Party	
Sambalpur	17	Sambalpur	Jayanarayan Mishra	Bharatiya Janata Party	Leader of Opposition
Sambalpur	18	Rairakhol	Rohit Pujari	Biju Janata Dal	Minister of State (I/C)
Deogarh	19	Deogarh	Subash Chandra Panigrahi	Bharatiya Janata Party	
Keonjhar	20	Telkoi (ST)	Premmananda Nayak	Biju Janata Dal	Minister of State (I/C), Disqualified on 11 April 2024.
Keonjhar	20	Telkoi (ST)	Vacant (since 11 April 2024)		
Keonjhar	21	Ghasipura	Badri Narayan Patra	Biju Janata Dal	
Keonjhar	22	Anandpur (SC)	Bhagirathi Sethi	Biju Janata Dal	
Keonjhar	23	Patna (ST)	Jagganath Naik	Biju Janata Dal	
Keonjhar	24	Keonjhar (ST)	Mohan Charan Majhi	Bharatiya Janata Party	
Keonjhar	25	Champua	Minakshi Mahanta	Biju Janata Dal	
Mayurbhanj	26	Jashipur (ST)	Ganesh Ram Singh Khuntia	Bharatiya Janata Party	
Mayurbhanj	27	Saraskana (ST)	Budhan Murmu	Bharatiya Janata Party	
Mayurbhanj	28	Rairangpur (ST)	Naba Charan Majhi	Bharatiya Janata Party	
Mayurbhanj	29	Bangriposi (ST)	Sudam Marndi	Biju Janata Dal	Cabinet Minister
Mayurbhanj	30	Karanjia (ST)	Basanti Hembram	Biju Janata Dal	Minister of State (I/C)
Mayurbhanj	31	Udala (ST)	Bhaskar Madhei	Bharatiya Janata Party	
Mayurbhanj	32	Badasahi (SC)	Sanatan Bijuli	Bharatiya Janata Party	
Mayurbhanj	33	Baripada (ST)	Prakash Soren	Bharatiya Janata Party	
Mayurbhanj	34	Morada	Rajkishore Das	Biju Janata Dal	
Balasore	35	Jaleswar	Aswini Kumar Patra	Biju Janata Dal	Minister of State (I/C)
Balasore	36	Bhograi	Ananta Das	Biju Janata Dal	
Balasore	37	Basta	Nityananda Sahoo	Biju Janata Dal	
Balasore	38	Balasore	Madanmohan Dutta	Bharatiya Janata Party	Died in June 2020.
Balasore	38	Balasore	Swarup Kumar Das	Biju Janata Dal	Won in November 2020 Bypoll.
Balasore	39	Remuna (SC)	Sudhanshu Shekar Parida	Biju Janata Dal	Suspended from party for anti party activities on 21 September 2023.
Balasore	39	Remuna (SC)	Sudhanshu Shekar Parida	Independent	Since 25 September 2023.
Balasore	40	Nilagiri	Sukanta Nayak	Bharatiya Janata Party	
Balasore	41	Soro (SC)	Parshuram Dhada	Biju Janata Dal	
Balasore	42	Simulia	Jyoti Prakash Panigrahi	Biju Janata Dal	Minister of State (I/C)
Bhadrak	43	Bhandaripokhari	Prafulla Samal	Biju Janata Dal	
Bhadrak	44	Bhadrak	Sanjib Mallick	Biju Janata Dal	
Bhadrak	45	Basudevpur	Bishnubrata Routray	Biju Janata Dal	
Bhadrak	46	Dhamnagar (SC)	Bishnu Charan Sethi	Bharatiya Janata Party	Died in September 2022.
Bhadrak	46	Dhamnagar (SC)	Suryabanshi Suraj	Bharatiya Janata Party	Won in November 2022 bypoll.
Bhadrak	47	Chandabali	Byomkesh Ray	Biju Janata Dal	
Jajpur	48	Binjharpur (SC)	Pramila Mallik	Biju Janata Dal	Speaker
Jajpur	49	Bari	Sunanda Das	Biju Janata Dal	
Jajpur	50	Barchana	Amar Prasad Satpathy	Biju Janata Dal	
Jajpur	51	Dharmasala	Pranab Kumar Balabantaray	Biju Janata Dal	Deputy Govt. Chief Whip
Jajpur	52	Jajpur	Pranab Prakash Das	Biju Janata Dal	
Jajpur	53	Korei	Ashok Kumar Bal	Biju Janata Dal	
Jajpur	54	Sukinda	Pritiranjan Gharai	Biju Janata Dal	Minister of State (I/C)
Dhenkanal	55	Dhenkanal	Sudhir Kumar Samal	Biju Janata Dal	
Dhenkanal	56	Hindol (SC)	Seemarani Nayak	Biju Janata Dal	
Dhenkanal	57	Kamakhyanagar	Prafulla Kumar Mallick	Biju Janata Dal	Cabinet Minister
Dhenkanal	58	Parjanga	Nrusingha Charan Sahu	Biju Janata Dal	
Angul	59	Pallahara	Mukesh Kumar Pal	Biju Janata Dal	
Angul	60	Talcher	Braja Kishore Pradhan	Biju Janata Dal	
Angul	61	Angul	Rajanikant Singh	Biju Janata Dal	Deputy Speaker
Angul	62	Chhendipada (SC)	Susanta Kumar Behera	Biju Janata Dal	
Angul	63	Athmallik	Ramesh Chandra Sai	Biju Janata Dal	
Subarnapur	64	Birmaharajpur (SC)	Padmanabha Behera	Biju Janata Dal	Cabinet Minister
Subarnapur	65	Sonepur	Niranjan Pujari	Biju Janata Dal	Cabinet Minister
Bolangir	66	Loisingha (SC)	Mukesh Mahaling	Bharatiya Janata Party	
Bolangir	67	Patnagarh	Saroj Kumar Meher	Biju Janata Dal	Deputy Govt. Chief Whip
Bolangir	68	Bolangir	Narasingha Mishra	Indian National Congress	Leader of Congress Legislature Party
Bolangir	69	Titlagarh	Tukuni Sahu	Biju Janata Dal	Cabinet Minister
Bolangir	70	Kantabanji	Santosh Singh Saluja	Indian National Congress	
Nuapada	71	Nuapada	Rajendra Dholakia	Biju Janata Dal	Cabinet Minister
Nuapada	72	Khariar	Adhiraj Mohan Panigrahi	Indian National Congress	
Nabarangpur	73	Umarkote (ST)	Nityananda Gond	Bharatiya Janata Party	
Nabarangpur	74	Jharigam (ST)	Prakash Chandra Majhi	Biju Janata Dal	
Nabarangpur	75	Nabarangpur (ST)	Sadasiva Pradhani	Biju Janata Dal	
Nabarangpur	76	Dabugam (ST)	Manohar Randhari	Biju Janata Dal	
Kalahandi	77	Lanjigarh (ST)	Pradip Kumar Dishari	Biju Janata Dal	
Kalahandi	78	Junagarh	Dibya Shankar Mishra	Biju Janata Dal	Minister of State (I/C)
Kalahandi	79	Dharmagarh	Mousadhi Bag	Biju Janata Dal	
Kalahandi	80	Bhawanipatna (SC)	Pradipta Kumar Naik	Bharatiya Janata Party	Leader of Opposition
Kalahandi	81	Narla	Bhupinder Singh	Biju Janata Dal	
Kandhamal	82	Baliguda (ST)	Chakramani Kanhar	Biju Janata Dal	
Kandhamal	83	G. Udayagiri (ST)	Saluga Pradhan	Biju Janata Dal	Deputy Speaker
Kandhamal	84	Phulbani (ST)	Angada Kanhar	Biju Janata Dal	
Boudh	85	Kantamal	Mahidhar Rana	Biju Janata Dal	
Boudh	86	Boudh	Pradip Kumar Amat	Biju Janata Dal	Cabinet Minister
Cuttack	87	Baramba	Debiprasad Mishra	Biju Janata Dal	
Cuttack	88	Banki	Devi Ranjan Tripathy	Biju Janata Dal	
Cuttack	89	Athgarh	Ranendra Pratap Swain	Biju Janata Dal	Cabinet Minister
Cuttack	90	Barabati-Cuttack	Mohammed Moquim	Indian National Congress	Suspended from party, later revoked.
Cuttack	91	Choudwar-Cuttack	Souvic Biswal	Biju Janata Dal	
Cuttack	92	Niali (SC)	Pramod Kumar Mallick	Biju Janata Dal	
Cuttack	93	Cuttack Sadar (SC)	Chandra Sarathi Behera	Biju Janata Dal	
Cuttack	94	Salipur	Prasanta Behera	Biju Janata Dal	
Cuttack	95	Mahanga	Pratap Jena	Biju Janata Dal	Cabinet Minister
Kendrapara	96	Patkura	Sabitri Agarwalla	Biju Janata Dal	
Kendrapara	97	Kendrapara (SC)	Shashi Bhusan Behera	Biju Janata Dal	
Kendrapara	98	Aul	Pratap Keshari Deb	Biju Janata Dal	Cabinet Minister
Kendrapara	99	Rajanagar	Dhruba Charan Sahoo	Biju Janata Dal	
Kendrapara	100	Mahakalapada	Atanu Sabyasachi Nayak	Biju Janata Dal	Cabinet Minister
Jagatsinghpur	101	Paradeep	Sambit Routray	Biju Janata Dal	
Jagatsinghpur	102	Tirtol (SC)	Bishnu Charan Das	Biju Janata Dal	Died in July 2020.
Jagatsinghpur	102	Tirtol (SC)	Bijay Shankar Das	Biju Janata Dal	Won in Nov 2020 Bypoll.
Jagatsinghpur	103	Balikuda-Erasama	Raghunadan Das	Biju Janata Dal	Minister of State (I/C)
Jagatsinghpur	104	Jagatsinghpur	Prasanta Kumar Muduli	Biju Janata Dal	Govt. Chief Whip
Puri	105	Kakatpur (SC)	Tusarakanti Behera	Biju Janata Dal	Minister of State (I/C)
Puri	106	Nimapara	Samir Ranjan Dash	Biju Janata Dal	Minister of State (I/C)
Puri	107	Puri	Jayanta Kumar Sarangi	Bharatiya Janata Party	
Puri	108	Brahmagiri	Lalitendu Bidyadhar Mohapatra	Bharatiya Janata Party	
Puri	109	Satyabadi	Umakanta Samantaray	Biju Janata Dal	
Puri	110	Pipili	Pradeep Maharathy	Biju Janata Dal	Died in October 2020.
Puri	110	Pipili	Rudra Pratap Maharathy	Biju Janata Dal	Won in October 2021 Bypoll.
Khordha	111	Jayadev (SC)	Arabinda Dhali	Biju Janata Dal	Disqualified on 11 April 2024.
Khordha	111	Jayadev (SC)	Vacant (since 11 April 2024)		
Khordha	112	Bhubaneswar Central	Ananta Narayan Jena	Biju Janata Dal	
Khordha	113	Bhubaneswar North	Susant Kumar Rout	Biju Janata Dal	
Khordha	114	Ekamra Bhubaneswar	Ashok Chandra Panda	Biju Janata Dal	Cabinet Minister
Khordha	115	Jatani	Suresh Kumar Routray	Indian National Congress	Suspended from party for anti party activities before 2024 elections.
Khordha	116	Begunia	Rajendra Kumar Sahoo	Biju Janata Dal	
Khordha	117	Khurda	Jyotirindra Nath Mitra	Biju Janata Dal	
Khordha	118	Chilika	Prasanta Kumar Jagadev	Biju Janata Dal	
Nayagarh	119	Ranpur	Satyanarayan Pradhan	Biju Janata Dal	
Nayagarh	120	Khandapada	Soumya Ranjan Patnaik	Biju Janata Dal	Suspended from party for anti party activities on 21 September 2023.
Nayagarh	120	Khandapada	Soumya Ranjan Patnaik	Independent	Since 25 September 2023.
Nayagarh	121	Daspalla (SC)	Ramesh Chandra Behera	Biju Janata Dal	
Nayagarh	122	Nayagarh	Aruna Kumar Sahoo	Biju Janata Dal	Cabinet Minister
Ganjam	123	Bhanjanagar	Bikram Keshari Arukha	Biju Janata Dal	Speaker
Ganjam	124	Polasara	Srikanta Sahu	Biju Janata Dal	Cabinet Minister
Ganjam	125	Kabisuryanagar	Latika Pradhan	Biju Janata Dal	
Ganjam	126	Khalikote (SC)	Suryamani Baidya	Biju Janata Dal	
Ganjam	127	Chhatrapur (SC)	Subash Chandra Behera	Biju Janata Dal	
Ganjam	128	Aska	Manjula Swain	Biju Janata Dal	
Ganjam	129	Surada	Purna Chandra Swain	Biju Janata Dal	
Ganjam	130	Sanakhemundi	Ramesh Chandra Jena	Indian National Congress	
Ganjam	131	Hinjili	Naveen Patnaik	Biju Janata Dal	Chief Minister
Ganjam	132	Gopalpur	Pradeep Kumar Panigrahi	Biju Janata Dal	Expelled from party for "anti people activities" on 29 November 2020.
Ganjam	132	Gopalpur	Pradeep Kumar Panigrahi	Independent	Since 29 November 2020.
Ganjam	133	Berhampur	Bikram Kumar Panda	Biju Janata Dal	
Ganjam	134	Digapahandi	Surjya Narayan Patro	Biju Janata Dal	Speaker, Died in September 2023.
Ganjam	134	Digapahandi	Vacant (since 2 September 2023)		
Ganjam	135	Chikiti	Usha Devi	Biju Janata Dal	Cabinet Minister
Gajapati	136	Mohana (ST)	Dasarathi Gomango	Indian National Congress	
Gajapati	137	Paralakhemundi	Rupesh Kumar Panigrahi	Biju Janata Dal	
Rayagada	138	Gunupur (ST)	Raghunath Gomango	Biju Janata Dal	
Rayagada	139	Bissam Cuttack (ST)	Jagannath Saraka	Biju Janata Dal	Cabinet Minister
Rayagada	140	Rayagada (ST)	Makaranda Muduli	Independent	
Koraput	141	Lakshmipur (ST)	Prabhu Jani	Biju Janata Dal	
Koraput	142	Kotpad (ST)	Padmini Dian	Biju Janata Dal	Minister of State (I/C)
Koraput	143	Jeypore	Tara Prasad Bahinipati	Indian National Congress	
Koraput	144	Koraput (SC)	Raghu Ram Padal	Biju Janata Dal	
Koraput	145	Pottangi (ST)	Rama Chandra Kadam	Indian National Congress	
Malkangiri	146	Malkangiri (ST)	Aditya Madhi	Bharatiya Janata Party	
Malkangiri	147	Chitrakonda (ST)	Purna Chandra Baka	Biju Janata Dal	

== By-polls ==
Year	Constituency	Reason for by-poll	Winning candidate	Party
Oct 2019	Bijepur	Resignation of Naveen Patnaik	Rita Sahu	Biju Janata Dal
Nov 2020	Balasore	Death of Madanmohan Dutta	Swarup Kumar Das	Biju Janata Dal
Nov 2020	Tirtol (SC)	Death of Bishnu Charan Das	Bijay Shankar Das	Biju Janata Dal
Oct 2021	Pipili	Death of Pradeep Maharathy	Rudra Pratap Maharathy	Biju Janata Dal
Jun 2022	Brajarajnagar	Death of Kishore Kumar Mohanty	Alka Mohanty	Biju Janata Dal
Nov 2022	Dhamnagar (SC)	Death of Bishnu Charan Sethi	Suryabanshi Suraj	Bharatiya Janata Party
Dec 2022	Padampur	Death of Bijaya Ranjan Singh Bariha	Barsha Singh Bariha	Biju Janata Dal
Jun 2023	Jharsuguda	Death of Naba Das	Dipali Das	Biju Janata Dal
