= Balasore =

City in Odisha, India

Balasore Baleshwar
- City
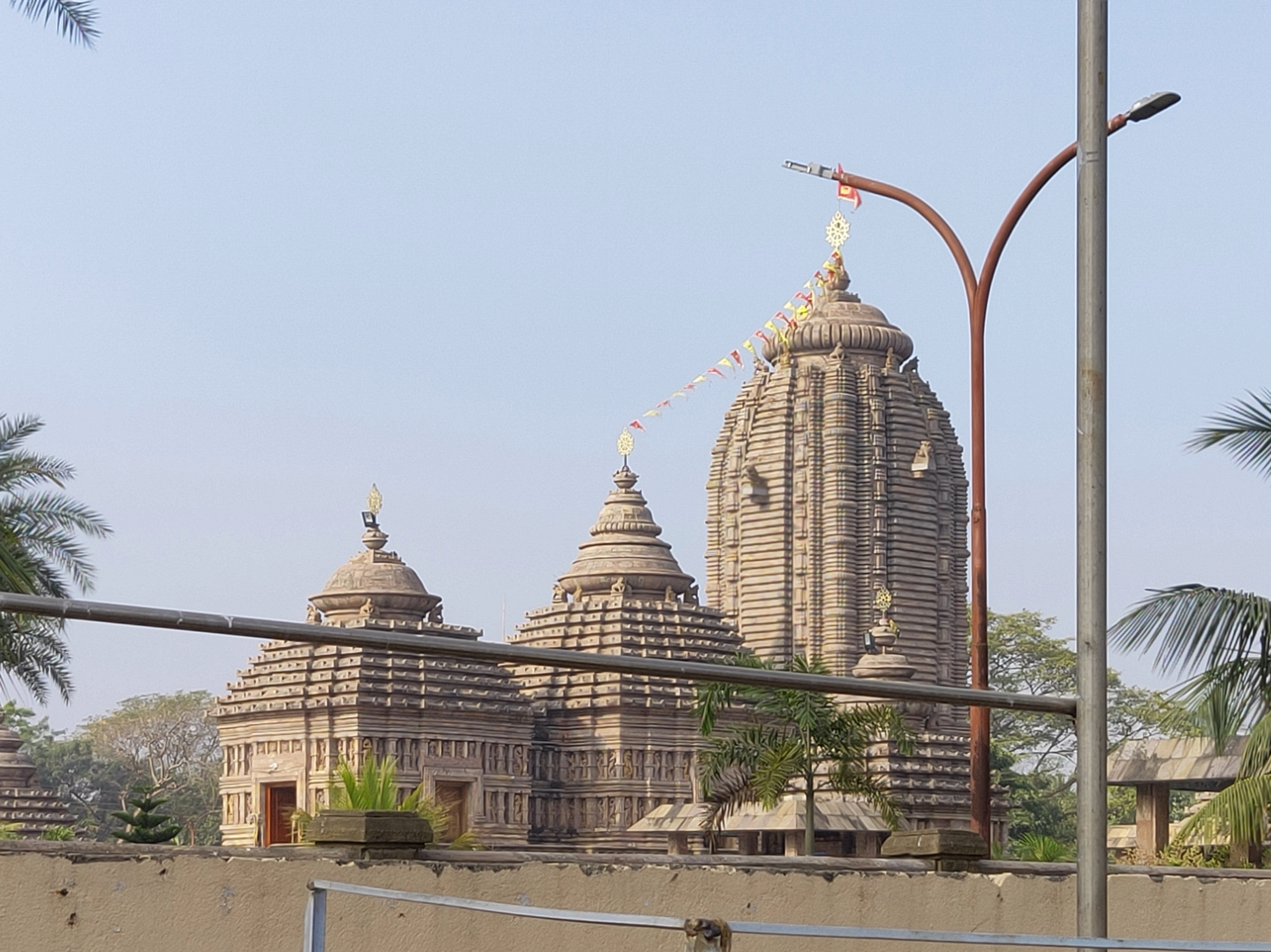
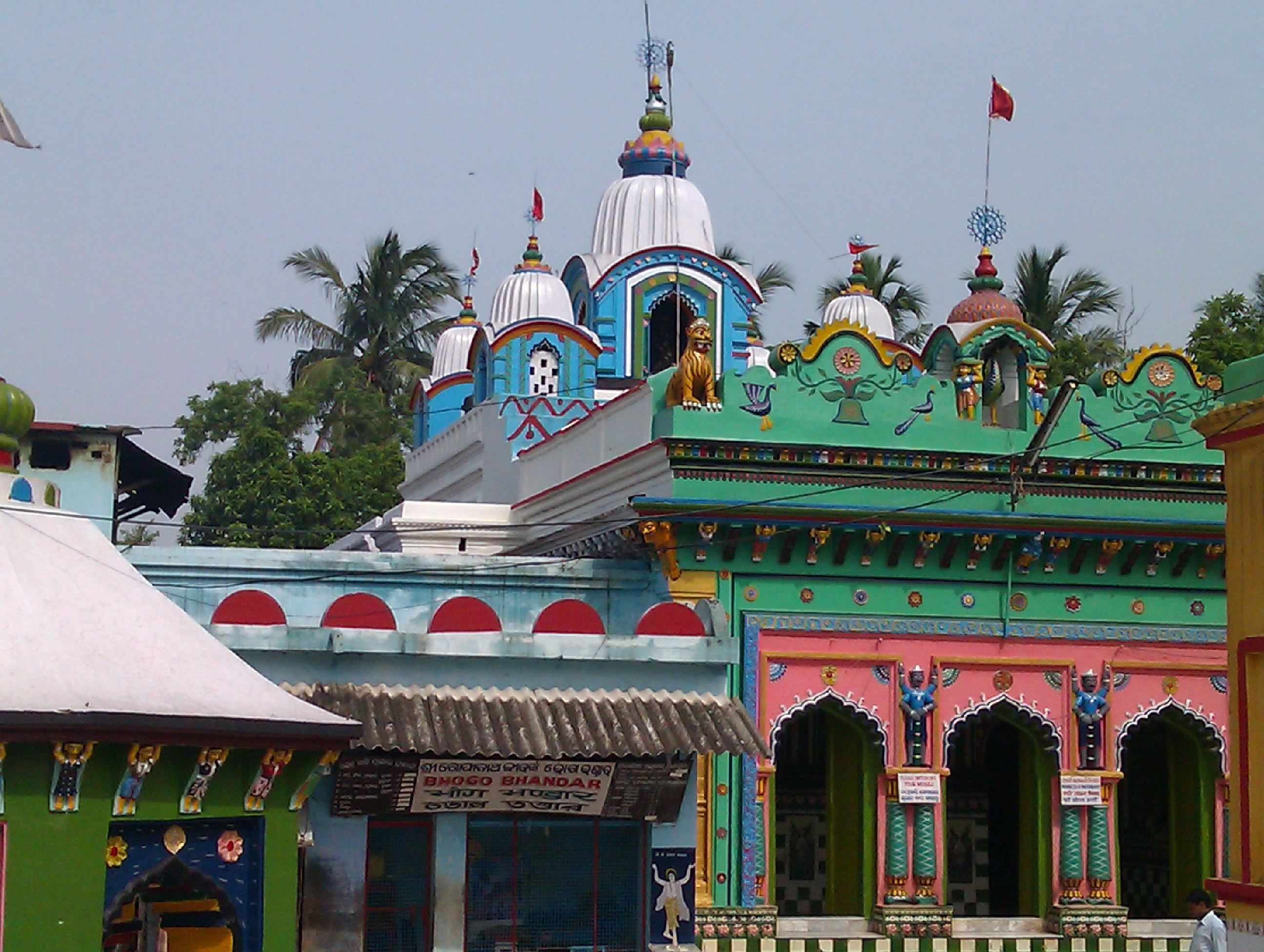
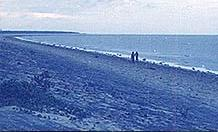
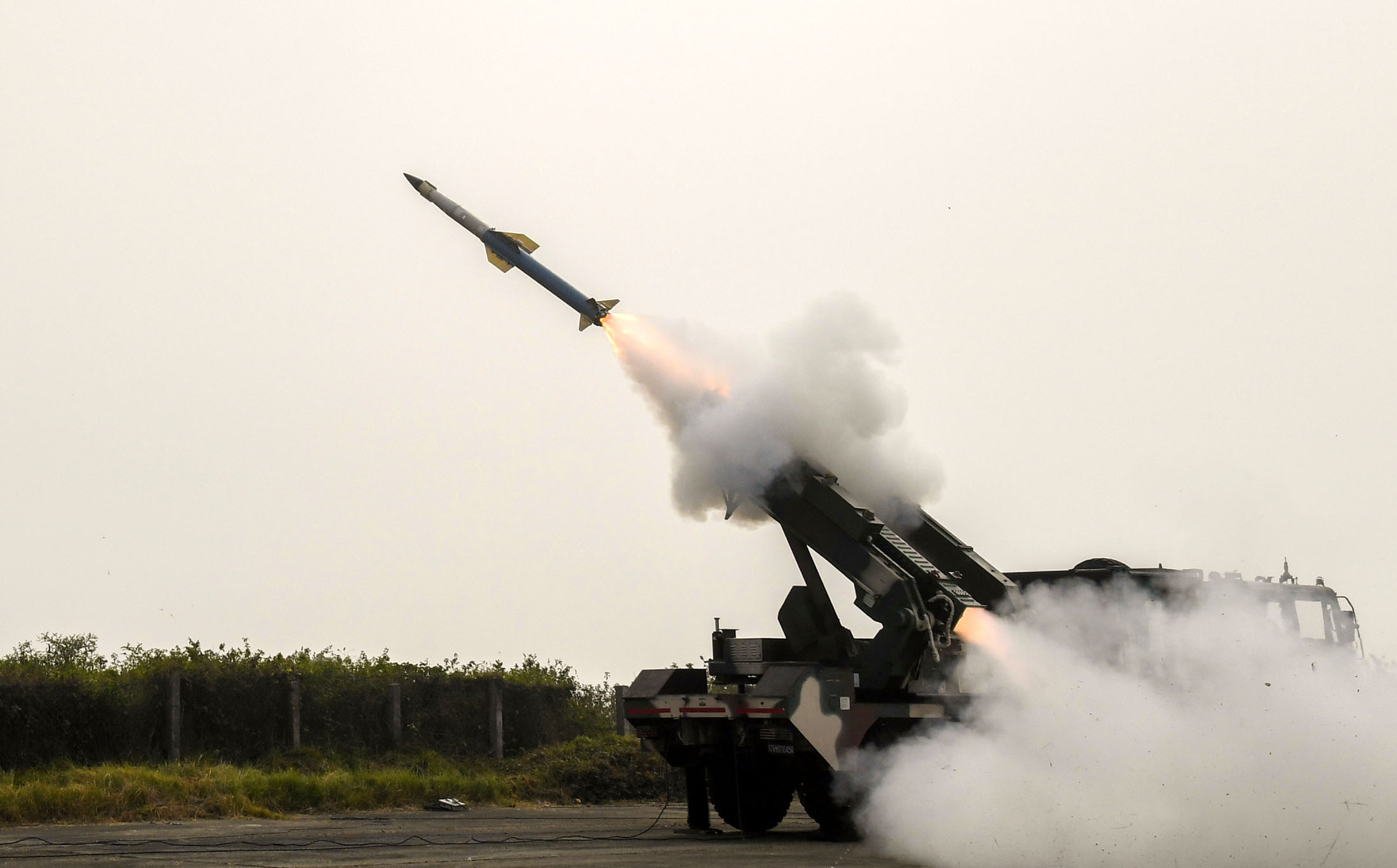
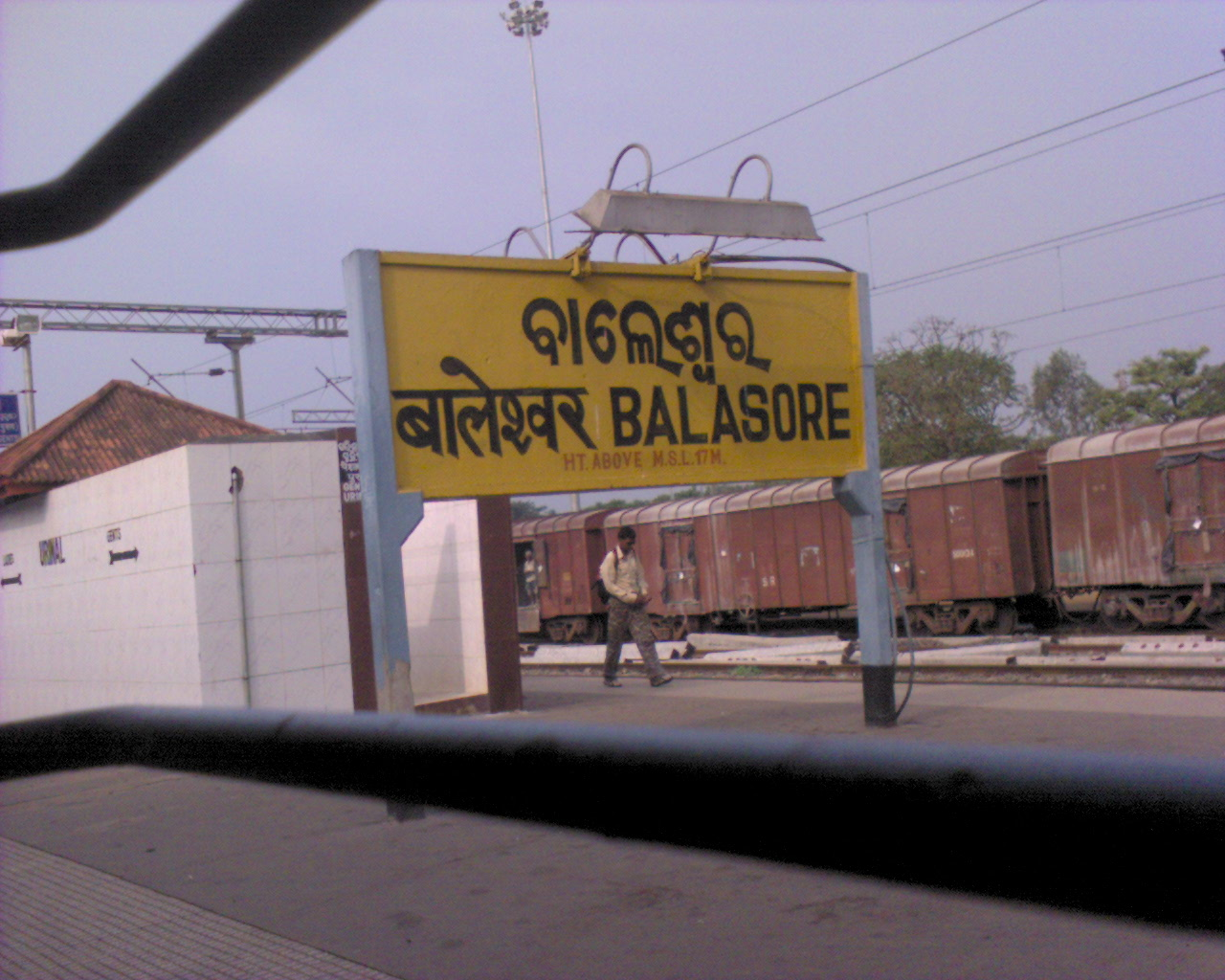
- From Top; Left to Right: Emami Jagannatha Temple, Khirachora Gopinatha Temple, Chandipur Sea Beach, DRDO Integrated Testing Range and Balasore Railway Station
- Interactive map of Balasore
- Location in Odisha, India Balasore (India) Balasore (Asia)
- Coordinates: 21°29′49″N 86°55′21″E
- Country: India
- State: Odisha
- District: Balasore

Government
  - Type: Municipality
  - Body: Balasore Municipality
  - Member of Parliament: Pratap Chandra Sarangi (BJP)
  - Member of Legislative Assembly: Manas Kumar Dutta (BJP)

Area
  - City: 17.48 km^{2} (6.75 sq mi)
- Elevation: 16 m (52 ft)

Population (2011)
  - City: 144,373
  - Rank: India 409th, Odisha 7th
  - Density: 8,259/km^{2} (21,390/sq mi)
  - Metro: 177,557
- Demonym(s): Balasorean, Baleswaria

Language
  - Official: Odia
- Time zone: UTC+5:30 (IST)
- PIN: 756001–756xxx
- Telephone code: 06782
- Vehicle registration: OD – 01 (previously OR – 01)
- UN/LOCODE: IN BLS
- Website: baleswar.nic.in

Balasore, officially known as Baleshwar, is a city in the state of Odisha, about 215 km (134 mi) from the state capital Bhubaneswar and 240 km (149 mi) from Kolkata, in eastern India. It is the administrative headquarters of Balasore district and the largest city as well as health and educational hub of northern Odisha. It is best known for Chandipur beach. It is also called 'missile city'. The Indian Ballistic Missile Defence Programme's Integrated Test Range is located 18 km south of Balasore.

== History ==
Excavation at villages near Balasore has given evidence for three distinct cultural phases of human settlements, viz., Chalcolithic (2000–1000 BCE), Iron Age (1000–400 BCE) and early historic period (400–200 BCE).

Baleswara district was part of the ancient Kalinga kingdom which later became a territory of Utkal, till the death of Mukunda Deva. It was annexed by the Mughal Empire in 1568 and remained as a part of their suzerainty up until the 1700s.

The British East India Company (EIC) established a factory at Balasore in 1633. In 1719, the Trieste Company merchants established a trading post there. As Calcutta rose in importance, Balasore became the centre for river pilot services for vessels seeking to ascend the Hooghly River. The city was bombarded by forces of the East India Company during the Anglo-Mughal War in 1686, however, the company was repulsed by the Mughal forces.

The old Pipili port was located near Baliapal, north of Balasore, along the coast near river Subarnarekha. The Portuguese arrived for trade and commerce, exporting Orissa products like rice, cotton and butter from Malaysia to Borneo, and bringing Chinese products and spices from Indonesia. Balasore gave its name to a type of cotton muslin.

The Marathas, then occupied this part of Odisha and it became a part of the dominion of the Bhonsle Maratha Rajas of Nagpur. They ceded this part through the Treaty of Deogaon in 1803 and it became a part of British Bengal Presidency until 1912.

Balasore as a separate district was created in October 1828 under the Bengal Presidency. On 7 November 1845, all of Danish India was sold to the British to form a part of British India.

With the creation of Bihar Province, Odisha, along with Balasore district, was transferred from Bengal to Bihar. But with the creation of Odisha as a separate state on 1 April 1936, Balasore became an integral part of Odisha State. The national movement of independence surged ahead with the visit of Mahatma Gandhi in 1921. Similarly, Praja Andolan was initiated against the ruler of Nilagiri State. The state of Nilagiri merged with state of Odisha in January 1948 and became a part of Balasore district. On 3 April 1993, Bhadrak sub-division became a separate district and from this day, Balasore remains a district of Odisha with two Sub-divisions namely Balasore and Nilagiri having eight Tehsils, namely Balasore, Soro, Simulia, Nilagiri, Jaleswara, Basta, Baliapal and Remuna and 12 blocks namely Bhograi, Jaleswar, Baliapal, Basta, Balasore, Remuna, Nilagiri, Oupada, Khaira, Soro, Simulia and Bahanaga. The name of the district is being derived from the name of the town.

Balasore is where the famous Indian independence activist Jatindranath Mukherjee, also known as Bagha Jatin, was injured and died fighting the British.

== Geography ==
=== Climate ===
Balasore has a tropical climate characterised by high humidity and hot temperatures throughout the year. The summers, which last from March to May, are particularly hot, with temperatures often reaching up to 40 °C. May is typically the hottest month of the year in Balasore. The winter season, which runs from December to February, is relatively cooler with an average temperature range of 16 °C to 27 °C. Monsoon season starts in June and lasts until September, bringing heavy rainfall to the city. Balasore's proximity to the Bay of Bengal makes it vulnerable to cyclonic storms during the monsoon season. The average rainfall in the district is around 1568.4 mm, which is largely due to the monsoon season.

Climate data for Balasore (1991–2020, extremes 1901–2012)
| Month | Jan | Feb | Mar | Apr | May | Jun | Jul | Aug | Sep | Oct | Nov | Dec | Year |
|---|---|---|---|---|---|---|---|---|---|---|---|---|---|
| Record high °C (°F) | 35.6 (96.1) | 38.7 (101.7) | 41.6 (106.9) | 46.0 (114.8) | 46.7 (116.1) | 46.1 (115.0) | 39.9 (103.8) | 36.7 (98.1) | 36.2 (97.2) | 36.1 (97.0) | 34.8 (94.6) | 33.6 (92.5) | 46.7 (116.1) |
| Mean daily maximum °C (°F) | 26.9 (80.4) | 30.2 (86.4) | 33.9 (93.0) | 36.0 (96.8) | 35.8 (96.4) | 34.1 (93.4) | 32.4 (90.3) | 31.9 (89.4) | 32.3 (90.1) | 31.9 (89.4) | 30.3 (86.5) | 27.5 (81.5) | 32 (90) |
| Mean daily minimum °C (°F) | 14.0 (57.2) | 17.7 (63.9) | 21.9 (71.4) | 24.6 (76.3) | 25.8 (78.4) | 26.1 (79.0) | 25.7 (78.3) | 25.6 (78.1) | 25.2 (77.4) | 23.2 (73.8) | 18.8 (65.8) | 14.6 (58.3) | 22.0 (71.6) |
| Record low °C (°F) | 7.2 (45.0) | 6.7 (44.1) | 11.7 (53.1) | 16.6 (61.9) | 18.4 (65.1) | 20.0 (68.0) | 20.0 (68.0) | 21.3 (70.3) | 20.3 (68.5) | 15.5 (59.9) | 8.9 (48.0) | 6.7 (44.1) | 6.7 (44.1) |
| Average rainfall mm (inches) | 19.3 (0.76) | 28.8 (1.13) | 31.9 (1.26) | 65.0 (2.56) | 154.5 (6.08) | 262.5 (10.33) | 293.7 (11.56) | 313.4 (12.34) | 299.0 (11.77) | 206.3 (8.12) | 29.7 (1.17) | 6.7 (0.26) | 1,710.7 (67.35) |
| Average rainy days | 1.1 | 1.6 | 1.8 | 4.6 | 6.7 | 10.6 | 14.3 | 15.1 | 12.2 | 6.7 | 1.5 | 0.6 | 76.7 |
| Average relative humidity (%) (at 17:30 IST) | 63 | 61 | 63 | 68 | 70 | 74 | 78 | 79 | 79 | 76 | 71 | 65 | 71 |
Source: India Meteorological Department

Balasore has been ranked 7th best “National Clean Air City” under (Category 3 population under 3 lakhs cities) in India.

== Demographics ==
Historical population
| Year | Pop. | ±% |
|---|---|---|
| 1872 | 18,263 | — |
| 1881 | 20,265 | +11.0% |
| 1891 | 20,775 | +2.5% |
| 1901 | 20,880 | +0.5% |
| 1911 | 21,362 | +2.3% |
| 1921 | 17,037 | −20.2% |
| 1931 | 17,843 | +4.7% |
| 1941 | 19,405 | +8.8% |
| 1951 | 22,851 | +17.8% |
| 1961 | 33,931 | +48.5% |
| 1971 | 46,239 | +36.3% |
| 1981 | 65,779 | +42.3% |
| 1991 | 101,829 | +54.8% |
| 2001 | 127,358 | +25.1% |
| 2011 | 140,000 | +9.9% |
Source: Census of India

According to 2011 Indian Census, Balasore (municipality + overgrowth) had a total population of 144,373, of which 73,721 were males and 70,652 were females. Population within the age group of 0 to 6 years was 14,773. The total number of literates in Balasore was 113,418, which constituted 78.6% of the population with male literacy of 81.7% and female literacy of 75.3%. The effective literacy rate of 7+ population of Balasore was 87.5%, of which male literacy rate was 91.0% and female literacy rate was 83.8%. The Scheduled Castes and Scheduled Tribes population was 15,812 and 9,291 respectively. Balasore had 30460 households in 2011.

=== Religion ===
Religious Demographic in Balasore Municipality (2011)
1. Hinduism (83.0%)
2. Islam (15.0%)
3. Christianity (1.64%)
4. Others (0.38%)

=== Languages ===
Languages spoken in Balasore Municipality (2011)
1. Odia (72.4%)
2. Urdu (13.6%)
3. Bengali (5.65%)
4. Santali (3.85%)
5. Hindi (3.66%)
6. Others (0.89%)

The official language of Balasore is Odia which is also the most commonly spoken language of the city. It is followed by Urdu, Bengali, Santali and Hindi in the descending order per the number of speakers.

== Government and politics ==
The MP from Balasore Parliamentary Constituency is Pratap Chandra Sarangi of BJP, who won the seat in the Indian general elections of 2019. The MLA from Balasore Vidhan Sabha Constituency is Manas Kumar Dutta of BJP, who won the seat in the 2024 legislative election. Previous MLAs from this seat were Swarup Kumar Das (BJD), who won in the 2020 bye-elections; Madanmohan Dutta (BJP), who won the seat in 2019; Jiban Pradip Das (BJD), who won this seat in 2009, Arun Dey (CPM) in 2004, Gopa Narayan Das of INC in 1985 and Kartik Chandra Rout of JNP in 1977. Balasore is part of Balasore (Lok Sabha constituency).

=== Civic Utility / Amenities / Services ===
==== Healthcare ====
Balasore government hospital was the city's first hospital. Also, it has a newly established Government Medical College at Remuna named after Fakir Mohan Senapati (FM Medical College).

== Economy ==
Balasore is the main city in the District of Balasore. The district has four major revenue sources – industries, agriculture, fishing and tourism with its base in Chandipur. Many small and large scale industries are located both within the city limits as well as the outskirts. Balasore Alloys Limited, Emami Paper Mills, Oriplast, and Birla Tyres are some of the major industries based in Balasore. It is one of the richest cities of Odisha. The main markets of Balasore are Nua Bazara, Motiganj, FM Square, Vivekananda Marga, Station Square, ITI Chhaka, Kachehri Road, Town Hall and Nua Shahi.

=== Industry ===
In an effort to bring industry, trade and commerce to a common meaningful platform, the Confederation of Indian Industry, with local chambers like North Orissa Chamber of Commerce and Industry, serve as an interface to fight for the rights and issues concerning the industrial scenario so as to contribute to the development of the state as a whole. Members from both public and private sectors work closely with the government for the expansion of business opportunities, enhancing efficiency and competitiveness and to work on policy issues. Located in Januganj, Balasore, NOCCI is essentially a business park with a massive exhibition hall, a separate residential block with hotel and restaurant facilities and an extended building called the industry facilitation centre specifically for industrial training. NOCCI comprises about 100 member units and six affiliated associations of the industrial units. NOCCI is instrumental in the promoting the initiative of the Department of Industrial Promotion and Policy, Ministry of Commerce and Industry, Government of India (GoI) through a scheme of Industrial Infrastructure Upgradation.

The Indian Ballistic Missile Defense Program's Integrated Test Range is located 18 km south of Balasore. The Defence Research and Development Organisation developed many different missiles such as Nag, BrahMos, Agni Missile among others here.

== Culture/Cityscape ==
Balasore culture is a blend of traditional festivals, food, and music. The city offers a cosmopolitan and diverse lifestyle with a variety of food, entertainment, available in a form and abundance comparable to that in other cities. Balasore residents celebrate both Western and Indian festivals. Diwali, Holi, Eid, Christmas, Navaratri, Good Friday, Dussehra, Muharram, Ganesha Chaturthi, Durga Puja, Raja and Maha Shivaratri are some of the popular festivals in the city. The akhada Arts Festival during durga puja is a unique culture of Balasore. Wedding ceremony of Lac Coated Dolls (also known as Jaukandhei) which has a rich ethical and ritual values in maintaining peaceful conjugal relationship in the family while bringing the health, wealth and prosperity to an individual's home is an important part of Balasore's folk culture.

=== Festivals ===
- Durga puja, the festival of goddess Durga, is very popular in Balasore. Idols are worshipped in many streets and localities. In this city, Durga puja is famous for its idols, with localities trying to outsmart each other by constructing more attractive idols. Indeed, the whole city comes to a standstill on Ashtami, Navami and on Dashami, burning of effigy of the demon Ravana (the eighth, ninth and tenth days of Durga puja), as people travel all over the city appreciating all the idols, is put forth by the neighbourhoods.
- Kali Puja, Just after Durga puja gets over, Balasore gears up with all its vigour to celebrate Kali puja on the auspicious day of Diwali, amidst the bursting of firecrackers.
- Kartikeshwara/Kumara puja: Kartikeshwara/Kumara is the eldest son of Lord Shiva.
- Kite-flying is also celebrated with much enthusiasm and energy in the city. Kite-flying culminates with the Makara Sankranti, with kite-flying competitions being held all over the city.
- All the other regular Indian festivals like Ganesha Chaturthi, Vasanta Panchami, Holi, Eid ul-Fitr, Good Friday, Ratha Yatra, Diwali, Christmas and the numerous Hindu festivals are also celebrated.

=== Places of interest ===
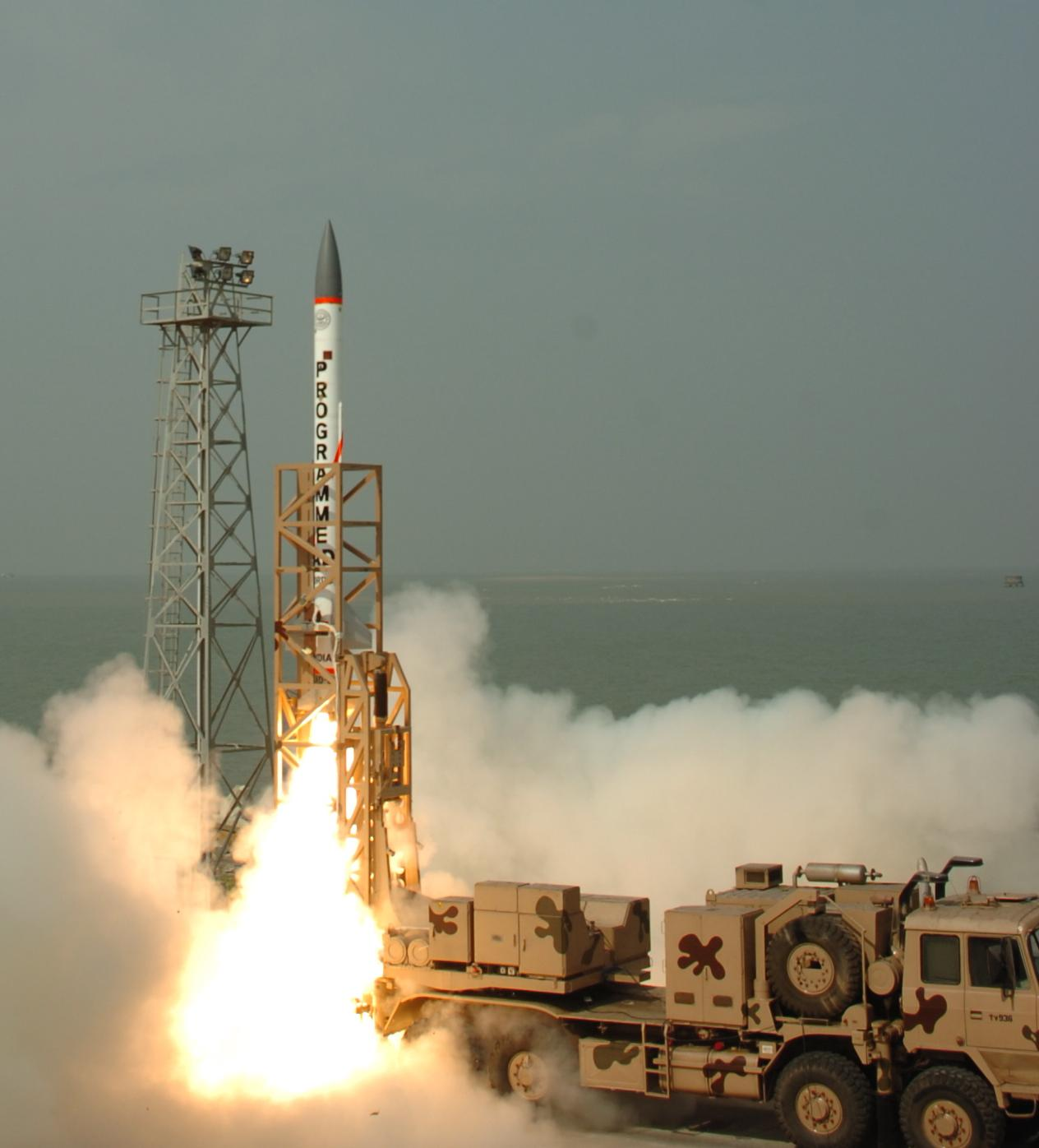
Missile launch in Abdul Kalam Island, Chandipur

Chandipur-on-sea is a seaside resort famous for its mile long beach. It is a unique beach – the tide comes to the shore only four times a day, at fixed intervals. At a distance of 30 km south-west is Panchalingeshwar, a temple and scenic spot high on a mountain. The presiding deity there, Shiva, cannot be seen. One has to touch and feel the statue as it is behind (submerged under) a waterfall. About 33 km south-west of Balasore, the town Santaragadia has the Bisweswara temple situated on a hill. The town is surrounded by hills on all sides. Nearby is Khulia village, a settlement of aboriginals. Around 30 km south-east of Balasore is a port named Dhamara.

- Kshirachora Gopinatha Temple, situated at Remuna, approximately 7 km from the main town of Balasore, was built by King Langula Narasimha Deva, who also built the famous temple at Konarka. Khirochora Gopinatha Temple is notable for its mythological story about how it was built there. The prashad of Krishna – the khira – is famous.
- The Biranchinarayana Temple, Palia, AstaDurga, and Bhudhara Chandi are some other temples located in the region.
- Jagannatha Temple, Remuna is a newly built temple in the area, the architecture of which is influenced by the famous Jagannatha Temple of Puri. It is the recent favourite tourist spot concerning the region.

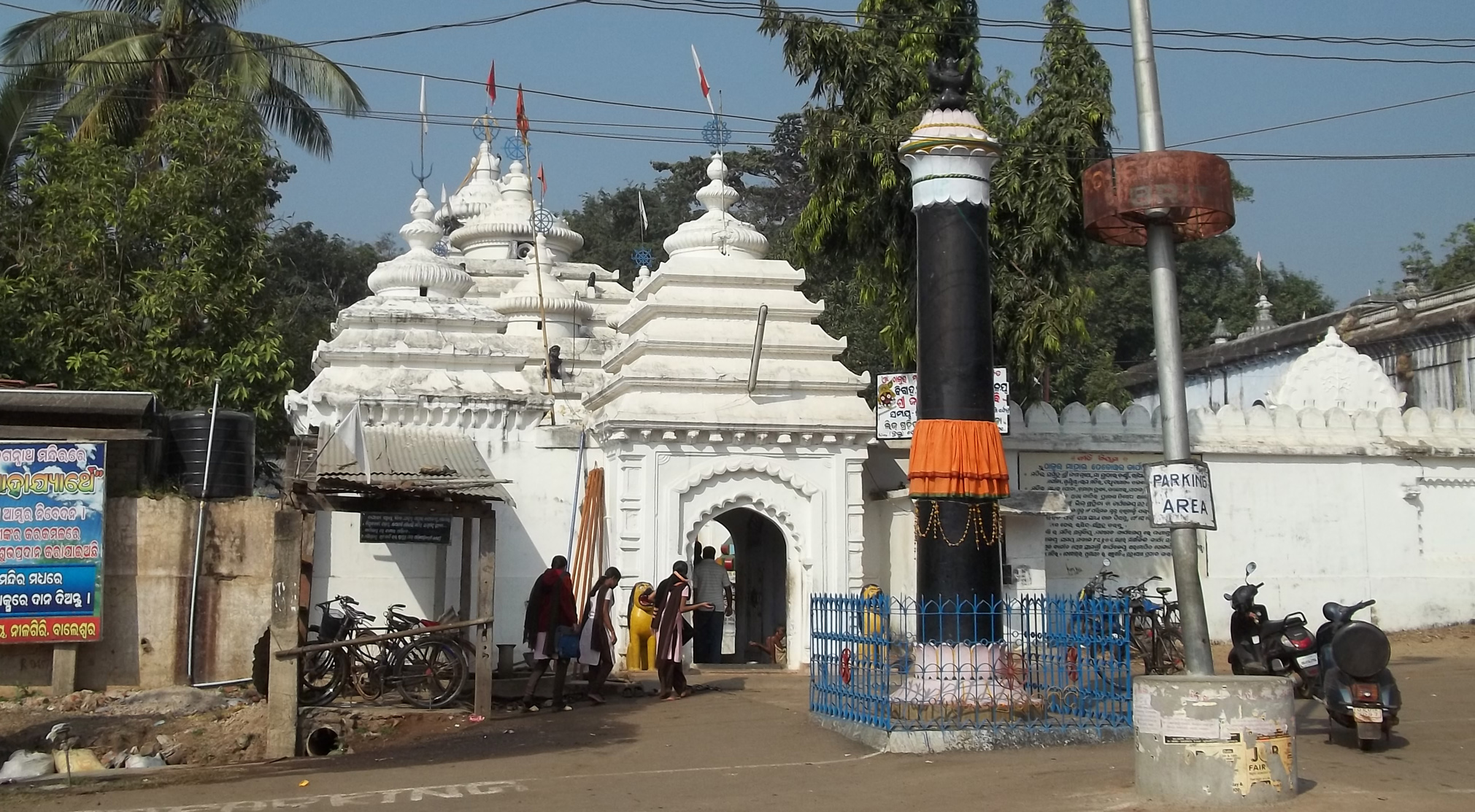
Jagannatha Temple Nilagiri

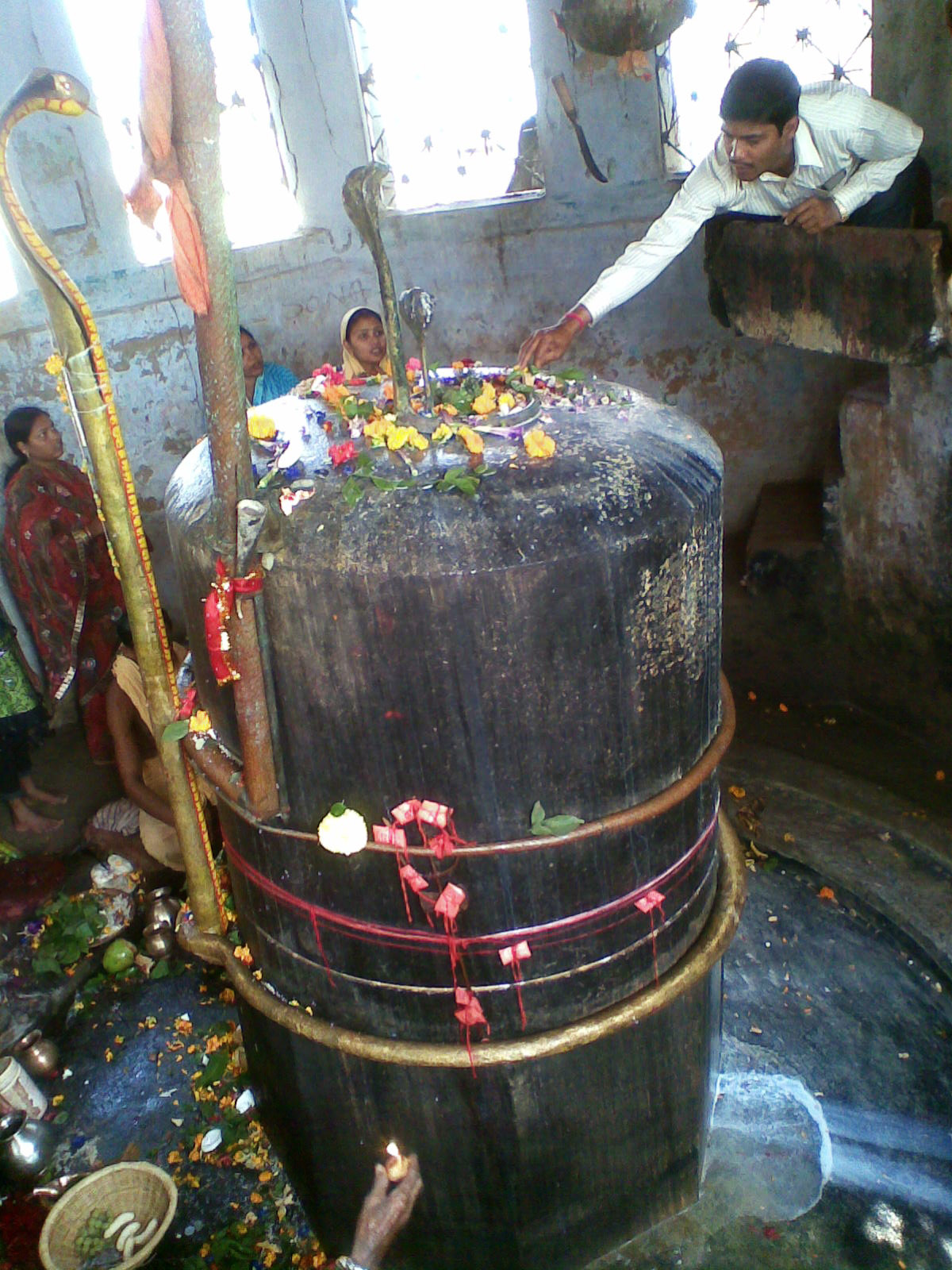
Bhusandeswara Temple

- There is a Jagannatha Temple in Nilagiri which is one of the prominent Jagannatha temples of Odisha. Lord Jagannatha, Balabhadra and Subhadra are worshipped here. Every year, Ratha Yatra is performed with all the deities.
- Panchalingeswar Temple is a temple near a picnic spot in Baleswara which is located 30 km from Balasore. There is a state tourism Pantha Nivas in Panchalingeswara for tourists. Panchalingeswara is surrounded by hills and forests.

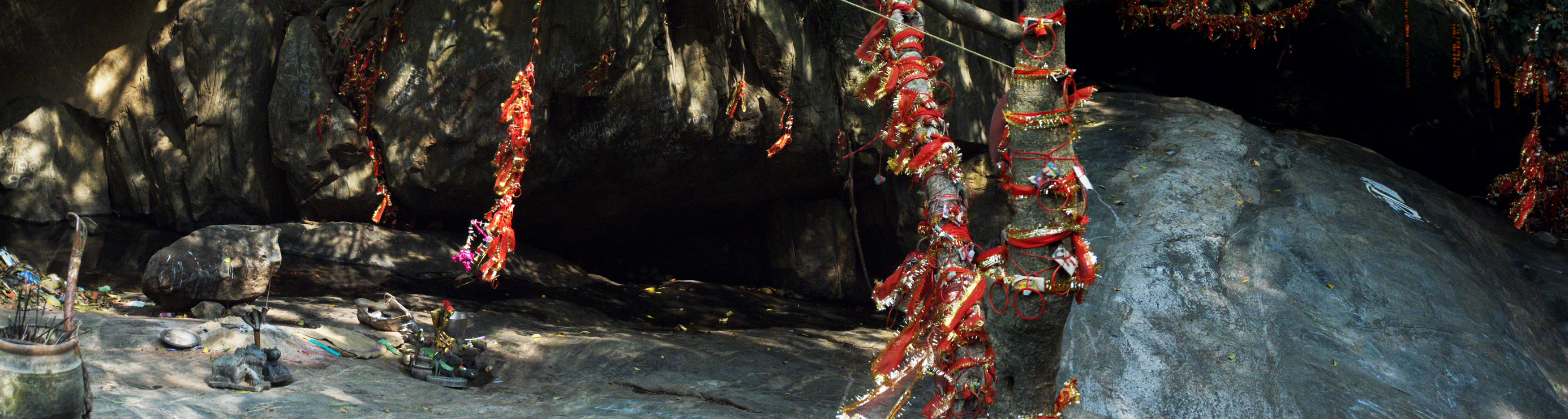
Panchalingeswara Temple

- Bhujakhia Pir, situated at sunhat at the heart of the city is the tomb of Sufi saint Aasthana Sharif Hazrat Pir named as Bhujakhia Pir. The most interesting thing is that both Muslims and Hindus jointly worship pir baba.
- Baba Bhusandeswar Temple is one of the largest Shiva Lingams in the World is in Bhogarai village of Balasore district, Odisha which is located 100 km from Balasore. The 12 feet long and 14 feet width lingam is carved out on a black granite and only half of the lingam is visible. The other half has remained buried for years. The diameter of the lingam is 12 feet and has three parts. The middle portion of the lingam is octagonal in shape, about 12 feet in diameter and nearly four feet in height. The Lingam slightly leans towards the right side.
- Mitrapur Jagannath Mandir is known as second Puri temple in Odisha.
- Dublagadi Sea Beach is a recently explored gem near the city where one can observe a magnificent dawn turning the white sands of the beach, red. In winter time, especially after or before two days of the new moon, you can watch the fluorescent sea waves under the bright open sky. Recently, many camps have been opened in this area by the local villagers to enjoy a stay in the lap of mother nature. The villagers maintain the area's cleanliness and the well-being of the environment.

== Transport ==
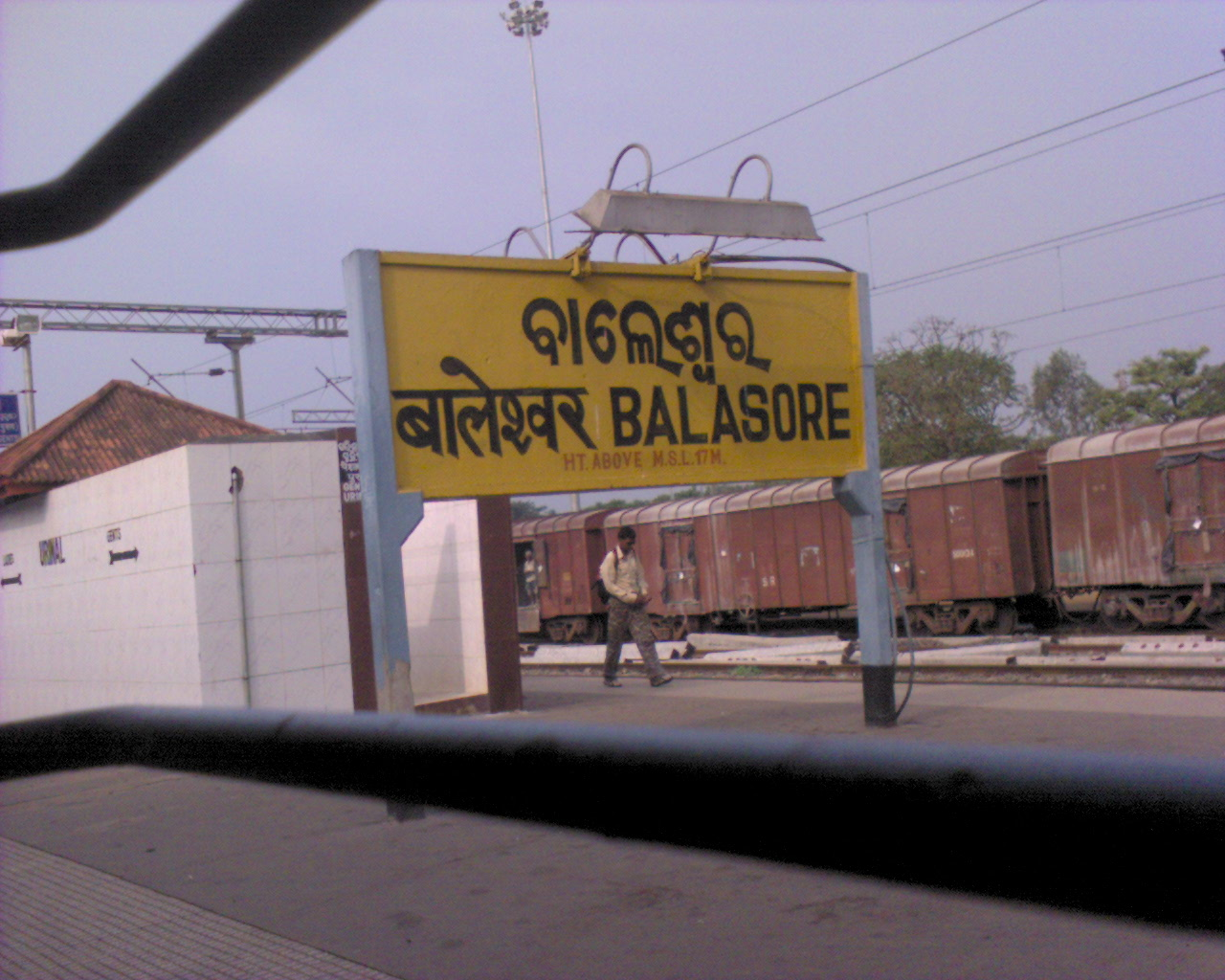
Balasore railway station

=== Air ===
The nearest airport is Biju Patnaik Airport in Bhubaneswar which is 200 km from Balasore. Netaji Subhas Chandra Bose International Airport in Kolkata is 254 km from Balasore.

=== Rail ===
Balasore railway station is an important station on the Howrah-Chennai main line of the South Eastern Railway. The distance to Kolkata is approximately 254 km, while the distance to Bhubaneswar is about 206 km. A branch line to Baripada starts from Rupsa, near Balasore. Balasore is connected to different parts of India through trains. There are frequent trains to Bhubaneswar, Cuttack, Rourkela, Brahmapur, Kolkata, New Delhi, Chennai, Guwahati, Bangalore, Puri, Pondicherry, Ernakulam.

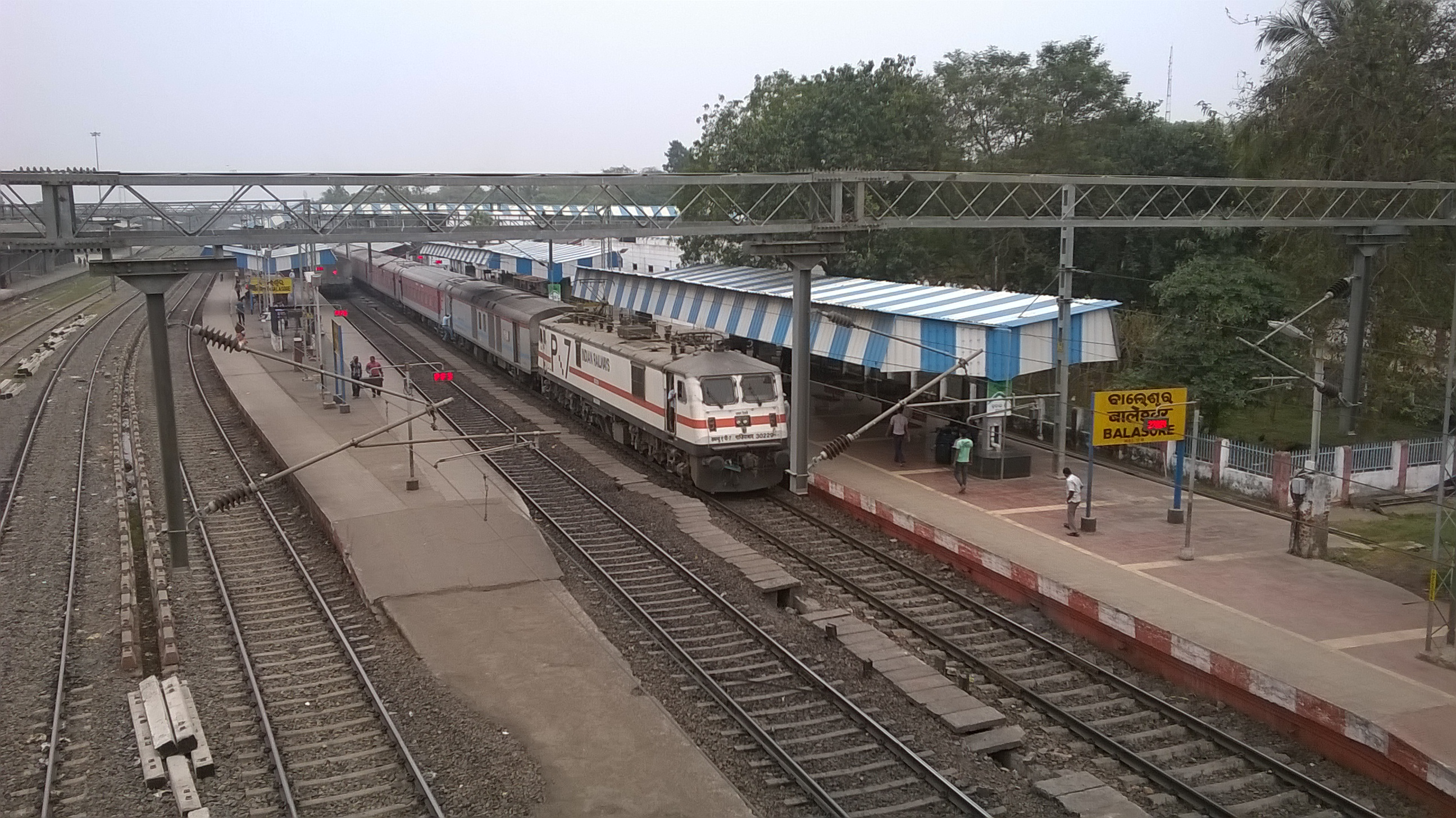
Balasore Railway station and Rajdhani express

=== Road ===
Balasore has well developed roadways. National Highway 16 and National Highway 18 pass through the city. A part of the Golden Quadrilateral project, this highway runs from Chennai to Kolkata. Intra-city transport comprises cycle rickshaws and auto rickshaws. City bus services commenced in Balasore on 15 August 2017. The bus terminus is at Sahadev Khunta and thousands of private buses ply to hundreds of destinations every day. Many luxurious A.C buses ply to Bhubneswar, Kolkata and other nearby cities daily.

== Education ==
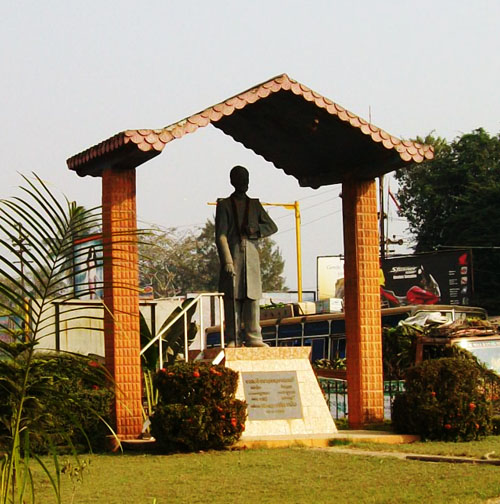
Statue of Fakir Mohan Senapati

Balasore is the main education hub of Northern Odisha with many engineering schools and colleges and the Fakir Mohan University, named after novelist Fakir Mohan Senapati who hails from this town of Odisha. Fakir Mohan Medical College and Hospital was established in 2018 to boost the medical facility in Balasore and Northern Odisha.

=== Universities/colleges ===
- Balasore Law College
- Fakir Mohan Medical College and Hospital
- Fakir Mohan University
- Jhadeswar Institute of Engineering & Technology

=== Schools ===
- D.A.V. Public School, Samalpur, Balasore
- Maharishi Vidya Mandir
- Modern Public School, Kuruda

== Sports and entertainment ==
Cricket is the most popular sport in the city. The city is also represented by the Balasore Baghas in the Odisha Premier League. Apart from cricket, people here love the game of football, volleyball and other sports.

=== Permit Field ===
It is a mini stadium located in front of District Hospital in the heart of the town known to host District and State level Cricket and Football matches. Many people come here for an early morning walk or doing yoga. This place has given birth to many sports personalities of Balasore. This place is maintained by Balasore Athletic Association.

=== Reserved Police Line Ground ===
It is a big ground which belongs to the Balasore Police Department and is maintained by them. It is used as a parade ground during various occasions. Many athletes come here for training purpose. General Public is allowed for morning walk.

=== Zilla School Stadium ===
It is a mini stadium which is situated near the Balasore Zilla School and is known to host various events such as Trade Fairs, District's Annual Fest and games like Cricket or Football. The stadium remains open for general public and is a popular spot for locals to engage in outdoor activities such as jogging, walking and playing cricket.

=== ITI Field ===
It is known for hosting events such as EXPO and Pallishree Mela Balasore, which are popular events in the town. In addition to these events, ITI Field also plays host to several other government-sponsored events throughout the year. One of the standout features of ITI Field is its cleanliness and well-maintained appearance, which has helped to establish it as a go-to place for outdoor events in Balasore.

=== Entertainment ===
Balasore has several cinemas playing films in Odia, Hindi, and English languages.

== Notable people ==
- Gopanarayan Das (1948–2022), MLA
- Manoj Das (1934–2021), novelist, short story writer and Padma Bhushan awardee
- Reela Hota, Odissi dance performer, educator and producer
- Radhanath Ray, Odia poet
- Fakir Mohan Senapati, Odia writer and poet
- Ibrahim Suhrawardy, writer and linguist

== See also ==
- Rocket launch sites
- Indian Space Research Organisation
- Thumba Equatorial Rocket Launching Station
- Chandipur
- Chandipur travel guide from Wikivoyage
- PanchaLingeswar travel guide from Wikivoyage
