= Gopanarayan Das =

Indian advocate and politician (1948–2022)

Member of the Orissa Legislative Assembly
- In office 1985–1990
- Preceded by: Arun Dey
- Succeeded by: Arun Dey
- Constituency: Balasore

Personal details
- Born: 1 March 1948
- Died: 15 September 2022 (aged 74) Odisha, India
- Party: Indian National Congress
- Spouse: Binapani Das
- Children: 3
- Education: Fakir Mohan University; Madhusudan Law University

Gopanarayan Das (1 March 1948 – 15 September 2022) was an Indian advocate and politician who served in the Orissa Legislative Assembly from 1985 to 1990. Das represented the Balasore Assembly constituency as a member of the Indian National Congress.

== Biography ==
=== Education ===
Gopanarayan Das was born on 1 March 1948. He first gained an interest in politics in the 1960s while he was a student at Fakir Mohan University in Balasore, becoming a student leader and organizing protests. Due to an ongoing state of emergency declaration, Das was drafted into the Indian Army in 1967, serving for a year in Siliguri with the Mahar Regiment. Das later studied law at Madhusudan Law University in Cuttack; while at this university, he was narrowly defeated in an election for student president. After graduating, Das established a law practice in Balasore.

=== Political career ===
In 1973, Das was elected to the Balasore City Council as a member of the Indian National Congress. Das also worked as an assistant public prosecutor for the Government of Orissa between 1975 and 1977. In 1977, Das became the general secretary of the Orissa Pradesh Youth Congress, and at some point he also served as the general secretary of the Indian National Trade Union Congress committee in Balasore. Das served on the city council until 1979, and he became the director of the co-operative bank in Balasore the following year. Later in 1980, Das served as a member of the executive board of the Pradesh Congress Committee, he was elected president of the panchayat samiti for Balasore, holding this position until 1985.

In the 1980 election, Das ran for the Balasore constituency of the Orissa Legislative Assembly. His main opponent was Arun Dey of the Communist Party of India; the two had previously been friends in college. Das was ultimately defeated by Dey, receiving 18,565 votes compared to Dey's 21,182. In the 1985 Orissa Legislative Assembly election, Das narrowly defeated Dey in a rematch, receiving 35,830 votes to 35,761. During his tenure in the legislative assembly, Das oversaw the industrialization of Balasore, including the opening of Birla Tyres. He also helped establish a new women's college in the region. Das did not run for re-election in the 1990 election, which was won by Dey. As of 2022, Das has been the last member of the Indian National Congress to hold the Balasore constituency.

Das ran again for the Balasore constituency in 1995; however, he was defeated by Dey, receiving 48,953 votes compared to Dey's 65,426. From 1996 to 2000, Das served as the chairman of the Odisha Small Industries Corporation. Das lost another run for the assembly in 2000, placing a distant third, receiving 33,163 votes compared to Dey's 39,604, while Jiban Pradip Dash of the Bharatiya Janata Party won with 53,242 votes.

=== Personal life and death ===
Das was married to Binapani Das and had 3 children. In addition to his political and legal careers, Das was also a part-time journalist for the National Herald.

On 14 September 2022, Das was admitted to the Balasore District Headquarters Hospital after complaining of chest pain. The following morning, while being transferred to a hospital in Cuttack, Das suffered a heart attack and subsequently died of cardiac arrest at the age of 74. Sarat Pattanayak, the president of the Odisha Pradesh Congress Committee, stated that his death was "an irreparable loss" for the Indian National Congress.
