= Babu Singh =

Babu Singh may refer to:

- Babu Singh (Rajasthan politician), Indian politician from Rajasthan
- Babu Singh (Odisha politician), Indian politician from Odisha
- Babu Singh Kushwaha (born 1966), Indian politician from Uttar Pradesh
- Babu Singh Maan, Indian songwriter and lyricist

== See also ==
- Babu (disambiguation)
- Singh, Indian surname
