= Babu Singh (Odisha politician) =

Indian politician

Member of the Odisha Legislative Assembly
- Incumbent
- Assumed office 4 June 2024
- Preceded by: Ashok Chandra Panda
- Constituency: Ekamra-Bhubaneswar

Personal details
- Party: Bharatiya Janata Party
- Profession: Politician

Babu Singh is an Indian politician from Odisha. He is a Member of the Odisha Legislative Assembly from 2024, representing Ekamra-Bhubaneswar Assembly constituency as a Member of the Bharatiya Janata Party.

== See also ==
- 2024 Odisha Legislative Assembly election
- Odisha Legislative Assembly
