= Fakir Mohan University =

University in Odisha, India

- Motto in English: Knowledge is Nectar
- Type: Public
- Established: 11 July 1999; 27 years ago
- Accreditation: UGC
- Chancellor: Governor of Odisha
- Vice-Chancellor: Santosh Kumar Tripathy
- Faculty: 112
- Students: 1,637
- Postgraduates: 1,473
- Doctoral students: 164
- Location: Balasore, Odisha, India; 21°32′38″N 86°48′57″E
- Website: fmuniversity.nic.in

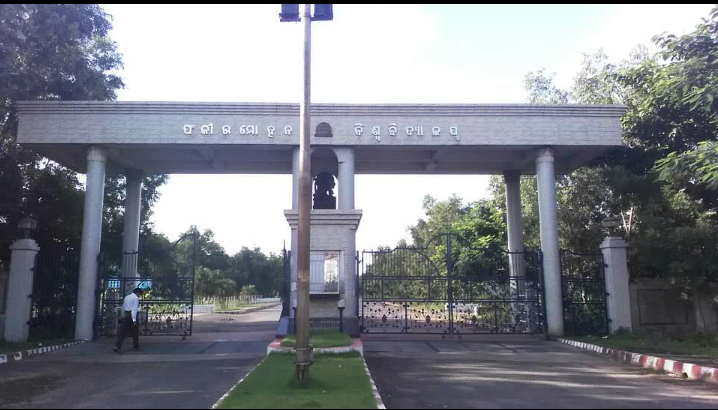
Fakir Mohan University entrance

Fakir Mohan University (FM University) is a state university located at Nuapadhi, Balasore, Odisha, India. It is named after Odia writer Fakir Mohan Senapati.

== History ==
This university was established by the Government of Odisha, under Section 32 of the Odisha Universities Act, 1989 (Act 5 of 1989). It was carved out of the Utkal University in 1999 and acts as an affiliating university. Professor Gorachand Patnaik, an eminent educationist of the state and a former principal of Ravenshaw College, is the founding Vice Chancellor of the university. FM University has 93 colleges and 15,000 students at the graduate and postgraduate levels. It is the only university in India that offers a postgraduate course in Ballistics.

== Campuses ==
FM University is functioning in two campuses: the old campus at Januganj, besides the National Highway near Remuna Golei (at 21.50614°N 86.89101°E, around 3 km (1.9 mi) from Balasore bus stand and railway station) and the new campus at Nuapadhi (at 21.5440°N 86.81592°E, around 15 km (9.3 mi) from Balasore bus stand and railway station). In March 2021, Union minister Pratap Chandra Sarangi inaugurated New Marine Bioresource and Biotechnology Centre at the university's Balasore campus.

== Colleges ==
FM University affiliates 96 colleges and 14 professional colleges including two autonomous colleges: FM Autonomous College, and Bhadrak Autonomous College. Its jurisdiction extends over Balasore and Bhadrak districts.

== Departments ==
1. Dept. of Atmospheric Science
2. Dept. of Physics
3. Dept. of Bioscience and Biotechnology
4. Dept. of Botany
5. Dept. of Business Management
6. Dept. of Chemistry
7. Dept. of Commerce
8. Dept. of Computer Science
9. Dept. of Education
10. Dept. of Environmental Science
11. Dept. of Geography
12. Dept. of Geology
13. Dept. of History & Archaeology
14. Dept. of Journalism & Mass Communication
15. Dept. of Language and Literature
16. Dept. of Mathematics
17. Dept. of Population Studies
18. Dept. of Social Science
19. Dept. of Zoology
20. Dept. of Library Science
21. Dept. of Micro Biology
22. Dept. of Anthropology
23. Dept. of PMIR
24. Dept. of MSW
25. Dept. of Applied Psychology

== Facilities ==
The university has a computer lab, bioscience (botany & zoology) and biotechnology lab, BIF- computer lab (at Dept. of Biosciences and Biotechnology), environmental science lab and Physics lab.

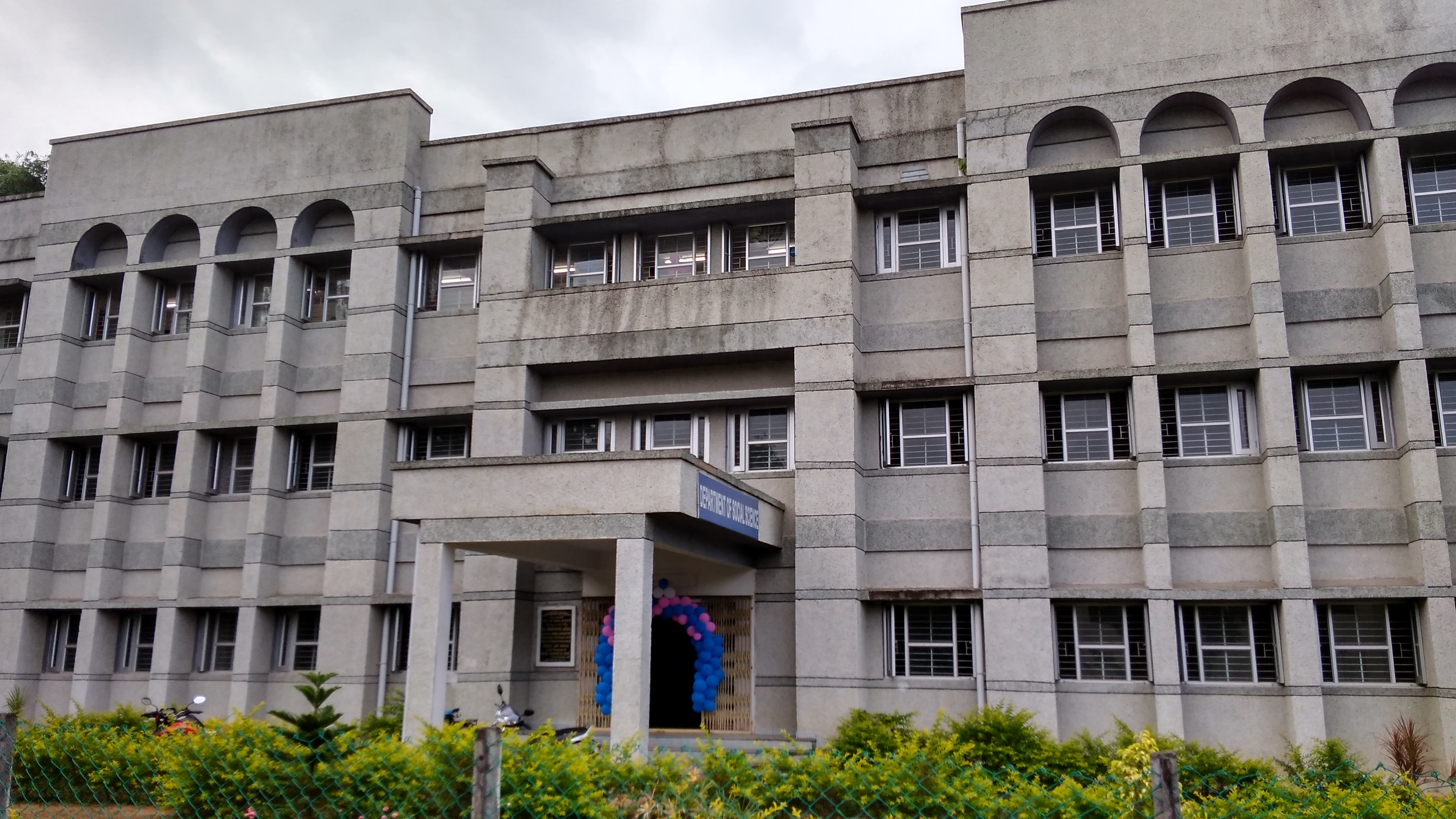
PG Department of Social Sciences

There is a centralised computer centre, central library with Internet connection (12 hrs open).

Welfare facilities include UCO bank, two ATMs (SBI and UCO), one canteen, a common gym for both boys and girls, a mini indoor stadium, one cricket field, one volley field, one boys hostel, two girls hostel, staff quarters and a guest house.

== Notable alumni ==
- Gopanarayan Das
- Gitanjali J Angmo
