= Bhujakhia Pir =

Indian Sufi saint

Coordinates: 21.479751°N 86.949683°E

Hazrat Bhujakhia Pir

Personal life
- Born: Swale Mohammad Baghdad, Iraq
- Died: Balasore, Odisha

Religious life
- Religion: Islam
- Denomination: Sufi

Muslim leader
- Based in: Balasore
- Post: Sufi saint
- Period in office: 16th century
- Arabic name
- Personal (Ism): Ṣāliḥ Muḥammad صالح محمد
- Epithet (Laqab): Bhujakhia Pir بوجاخيا بير
- Toponymic (Nisba): al-Baghdādī البغدادي al-Sunhatī السنهتي

Bhujakhia Pir is the tomb of Sufi saint Aasthana Sharif Hazrat Pir (named Hajrat Swale Mohammad, better known as Bhujakhia Pir), situated at Sunhat at the heart of the city. The shrine of Baba Bhujakhia pir of Balasore stands as a symbol of harmony between Muslims and Hindus. During the occasion of Urs, a crowd of both Hindus and Muslims gathers at the shrine, an age-old tradition.

== History ==
The legend tells that Hajrat Swale Mohammad from Baghdad, Iraq, named afterwards as "Bhujakhia Pir", had come to Orissa, India in the 16th century and devoted himself to the service of mankind, especially to the service of Cholera victims. In his begging, he asked for the daily food of the people of Balasore and the bhuja (mudhi, or puffed rice) which was always available in all the houses. People used to call him Fakir Baba. Fakir's Baba kept asking for food, and whatever Baba got he would distribute to all the children in the evening.

In the 1800s, people from all over the world came to worship the ancestor of Bhujakhia Pir Baba, but most of the Hindus did not go near Pir Baba near the pond. The first "Urus or Urus" festival was started in 1952 on the advice of Hazrat Maulana Mohammad Habibur Rahman, the father of Dhamanagar. That Urus word was Arabic. The other meaning of the word was worship or mental festival. Urus was celebrated every Thursday, but that was later the custom of celebrating the "Urus" festival almost once a year, after counting a particular month and date.

This "Urus" festival was celebrated by the Hindus and played a major role in the Hindus. When it was formally launched in 1952, it was headed by Kabiraj Lambohar Das of Sunhat. Besides Mahindra Das, Shiva Parida and Qazi Mohammad Reza started it in the traditional way. It has been celebrated for three days a year since 1970. The first day of Urus is Wednesday: Baba's place is washed by adding 75 କଳସ (Jars of Water) water from the Budhabalanga river and adding sandalwood. This is called a "gosal bath". On Thursdays, Puffed Rice is offered to the for Wish (ମାନସିକ). There is a Feast on Friday.

== Customs ==
Before the Urs of Hajrat swale Mohammad, the Urs of Ahmed Shah Baba is observed. Urs of Bhujakhia Pir Astana is celebrated at the last Wednesday, Thursday, and Friday of March. It is very popular in Balasore, but even people from outside Balasore visit to observe it.

When he first came to Balasore he sat under a neem tree where now there is his astana. Previously, it opened up toward the side, but it is nicely built. It comes on the way going to Chandipur. People go to Astana on Thursday and worship there for whatever they want. Many people read the Quran there. Many people also tie threads at the left side of inner wall, in belief that when the baba completes their wish they will untie it. People use Bhuja (puffed rice) as Sirni: veg Biryani/langar made from Arua rice and various vegetables. It is eaten by people of both Hindu and Muslim communities.

Newly married couples come there and wish for the well being of their spouse and family members. The annual Fateha (Urs Swalehiya) was observed on 10, 11, and 12 April 2013.
