= Bhadrak Autonomous College =

College in Bhadrak, Odisha, India

- Established: 6 July 1948; 77 years ago
- Affiliations: Fakir Mohan University
- Principal: Dr. D .P Swain
- Location: Bhadrak, Odisha, India

Bhadrak Autonomous College was established on 6 July 1948 in Bhadrak, Odisha, India. At first, the college was affiliated to Utkal University for Intermediate Arts only. Intermediate Science classes were started in 1954-55. It is affiliated to Fakir Mohan University.

== History ==
The college took its birth on 6 July 1948 with intermediate class in Arts only. Subsequently, Science course started with construction of Science block in the year 1964. The degree courses in Arts, Science started in 1951 & 1961 respectively and Commerce in 1965.

The college was initially affiliated to Utkal University in the year 1948 and got affiliation to Fakir Mohan University after its establishment in the year 1999. In 2018, several PG courses were opened including Physics, Applied Physics, Applied Chemistry, Zoology and Microbiology. Self financing B.Ed was opened from 2017 to 2018. Applied physics and Applied chemistry degrees of this college are now equivalent to physics and chemistry degree of Fakir Mohan University as per the declaration by VC of FM university.

== Post graduate courses ==
Physics, Applied physics, chemistry, Applied chemistry, microbiology, mathematics, zoology, botany, Urdu, Sanskrit, English, economics, political science, history, Commerce, computer science

== Professional courses ==
B.Ed, BCA, MBA ,MCA ,MJMC ,MPMIR

== Campus ==
Bhadrak Autonomous College has a campus of 27 acres near salandi river in the headquarters of Bhadrak district in the state of Odisha.

== See also ==
- Education in Odisha
- List of institutions of higher education in Odisha
- Maharaja Purna Chandra Autonomous College, Baripada
