= Panchalingeswar Temple =

Temple in India

Coordinates: 21.428775°N 86.729148°E

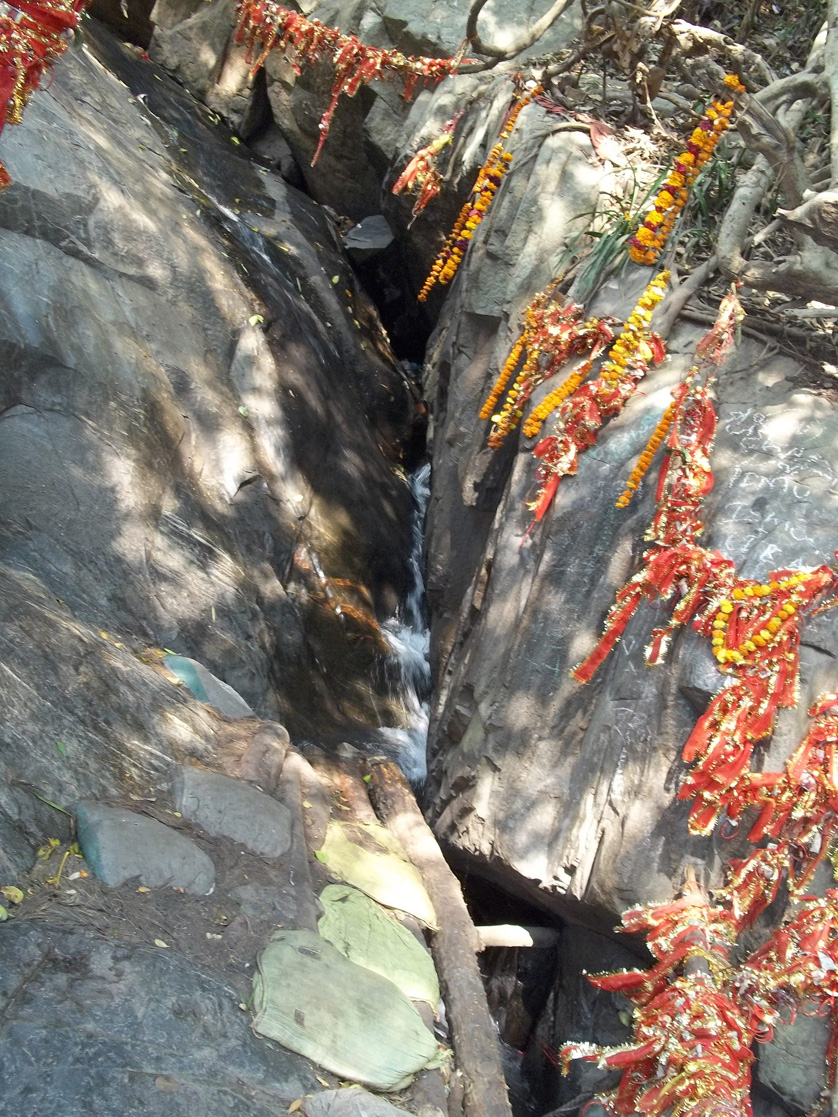
- Panchalingeswara Temple Nilagiri Baleswar

Religion
- Affiliation: Hinduism
- District: Balasore
- Deity: Shivalinga

Location
- Location: Balasore
- State: Odisha
- Country: India

Panchalingeswar Temple is in Balasore district of Odisha, India. It is named after the five Shivalinga that are enshrined inside. The temple is on top of a hillock near the Nilagiri hill.

The Shivalingas are said to have been enshrined by Sita, the wife of Lord Rama during their exile. Another story holds that King Banasura worshiped the Swayambhu Lingas at this place given its beauty. A perennial stream, which is the main attraction of the area, regularly washes the Shivalingas as it flows over them. To reach to the Shivalingas, one has to lie flat on the rock parallel to the stream, touch and worship the lingas present inside a natural reservoir of the water stream.

== Location ==
Panchalingeswar is 27.7 km south west from Balasore. Geographical co-ordinate is 21.41 North 86.71 East.

== Transportation facility ==
Panchalingeswar comes under Balasore district. Balasore is also the nearest city from Panchalingeswar. The nearest NAC to Panchalingeswar is Nilagiri. Regular bus services are available from Bhubaneswar to both Nilagiri and Balasore. A visitor can come to Balasore through Bhubaneswar Airport (200 km) or Kolkata Airport (250 km). There are regular transportation facilities between Panchalingeswar and Balasore.
