= Simulia Assembly constituency =

Constituency of the Odisha legislative assembly in India

Coordinates: 21.27°N 86.73°E

Simulia
- Constituency No. 42 for the Odisha Legislative Assembly

Constituency details
- Country: India
- Region: East India
- State: Odisha
- Division: Central Division
- District: Balasore
- Lok Sabha constituency: Bhadrak
- Established: 1961
- Total electors: 2,57,238 (Note: as on 2024) (Note: as data published by election commission)
- Reservation: None

Member of Legislative Assembly
- 17th Odisha Legislative Assembly
- Incumbent Padma Lochan Panda
- Party: Bharatiya Janata Party
- Elected year: 2024

Simulia is a Vidhan Sabha constituency of Balasore district, Odisha.

Area of this constituency includes Simulia block and Khaira block.

== Elected members ==
Vote share of winning candidates
2024	49.54%
2019	51.35%
2014	42.24%
2009	47.87%
2004	50.28%
2000	49.95%
1995	49.41%
1990	64.08%
1985	46.94%
1980	28.32%
1977	39.03%

Since its formation in 1961, 15 elections were held thru 2024.

List of members elected from Simulia constituency are:

Year	Member	Party
2024	Padma Lochan Panda	Bharatiya Janata Party
2019	Jyoti Prakash Panigrahi	Biju Janata Dal
2014	Jyoti Prakash Panigrahi	Biju Janata Dal
2009	Parsuram Panigrahi	Biju Janata Dal
2004	Padma Lochan Panda	Indian National Congress
2000	Parsuram Panigrahi	Biju Janata Dal
1995	Padma Lochan Panda	Indian National Congress
1990	Parsuram Panigrahi	Janata Dal
1985	Padma Lochan Panda	Indian National Congress
1980	Parsuram Panigrahi	Janata Party
1977	Gopinath Das	Janata Party
1974	Sailen Mohapatra	Indian National Congress
1971	Chintamani Jena	Communist Party of India
1967	Uchhab Charan Jena	Praja Socialist Party
1961	Bhagiratha Das	Indian National Congress

== Election results ==
=== 2024 ===
Voting were held on 1 June 2024 in 4th phase of Odisha Assembly Election & 7th phase of Indian General Election. Counting of votes was on 4 June 2024. In 2024 election, Bharatiya Janata Party candidate Padma Lochan Panda defeated Biju Janata Dal candidate Subhashini Sahu by a margin of 13,183 votes.

2024 Odisha Vidhan Sabha Election, Simulia
Party	Candidate	Votes	%	±%
BJP	Padma Lochan Panda	90,676	49.54	
BJD	Subhashini Sahu	77,493	42.34	
INC	Himanshu Sekhar Behera	13,067	7.14	
NOTA	None of the above	693	0.38	
Majority		13,183	7.2	
Turnout		1,83,028	71.15	
BJP gain from BJD				

=== 2019 ===
In 2019 election, Biju Janata Dal candidate Jyoti Prakash Panigrahi defeated Bharatiya Janata Party candidate Padma Lochan Panda by a margin of 14,959 votes.

2019 Odisha Vidhan Sabha Election, Simulia
Party	Candidate	Votes	%	±%
BJD	Jyoti Prakash Panigrahi	90,083	51.35	
BJP	Padma Lochan Panda	75,124	42.82	
INC	Ananta Prasad Sethi	8,353	4.76	
NOTA	None of the above	802	0.46	
Majority		14,959	8.53	
Turnout		1,75,430	72.55	
BJD hold				

=== 2014 ===
In 2014 election, Biju Janata Dal candidate Jyoti Prakash Panigrahi defeated Indian National Congress candidate Padma Lochan Panda by a margin of 7,937 votes.

2014 Vidhan Sabha Election, Simulia
Party	Candidate	Votes	%	±%
BJD	Jyoti Prakash Panigrahi	65,854	42.24	▼5.63
INC	Padma Lochan Panda	57,917	37.15	▼2.48
BJP	Shashi Kumar Sahoo	28,011	17.97	
NOTA	None of the above	769	0.49	
Majority		7,937	5.09	
Turnout		1,55,906	73.84	
Registered electors		2,11,136		
BJD hold				

=== 2009 ===
In 2009 election, Biju Janata Dal candidate Parsuram Panigrahi defeated Indian National Congress candidate Padma Lochan Panda by a margin of 10,927 votes.

2009 Vidhan Sabha Election, Simulia
Party	Candidate	Votes	%	±%
BJD	Parsuram Panigrahi	63,479	47.87	−
INC	Padma Lochan Panda	52,552	39.63	−
Independent	Mahendra Prasad Jena	8,047	6.07	−
BJP	Tanuja Panda	5,023	3.79	−
Majority		10,927	8.24 (Note: % of total valid votes)	
Turnout		1,32,618	67.56	−
BJD gain from INC				
