= Swarup Kumar Das =

Indian politician

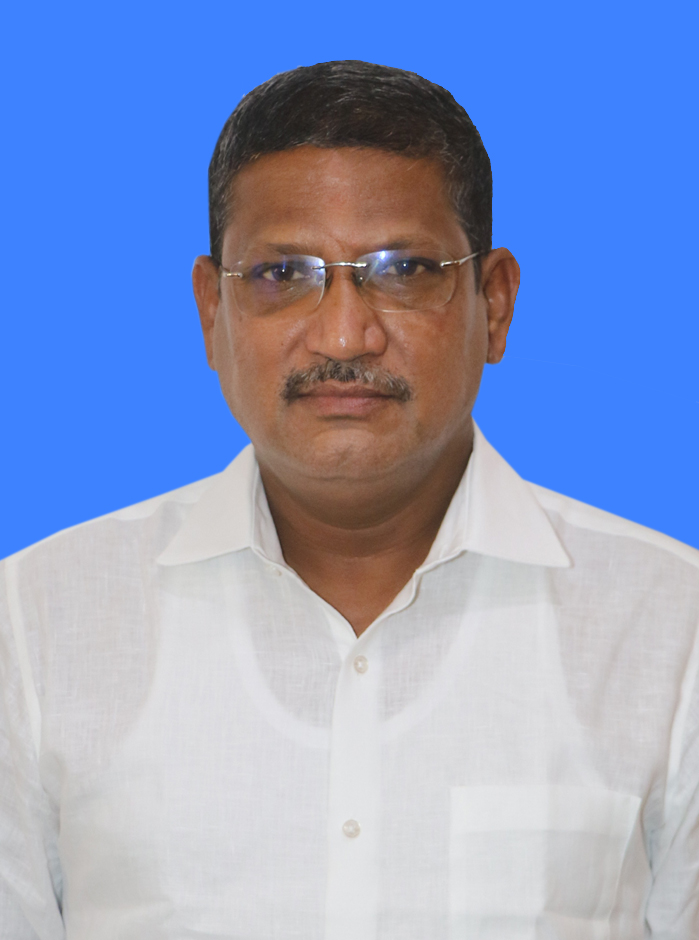

Odisha Legislative Assembly

Member of the U.S. House of Representatives from Odisha
- In office 10 November 2020 – 5 June 2024
- Preceded by: Madan Mohan Dutta
- Constituency: Balasore

Personal details
- Born: 11 April 1970 (age 56)
- Party: BJD
- Spouse: Sagarika Das
- Education: St. Vincent's Convent School, Balasore
- Profession: Politician

Swarup Kumar Das was the Member of Legislative Assembly from Balasore Vidhan Sabha Constituency from 2020 to 2024.. He is a politician from Balasore, Odisha, India. He is a member of the Biju Janata Dal (BJD) political party.

In his first election Das won by over 13,000 votes defeating Manas Kumar Dutta.
