= Nilagiri =

Nilagiri Nilgiri
- Town
- Location in Odisha, India Nilagiri (India)
- Coordinates: 21.46°N 86.77°E
- Country: India
- State: Odisha
- District: Balasore

Area
  - Total: 11.59 km^{2} (4.47 sq mi)

Population (2001)
  - Total: 14,745
  - Density: 1,272/km^{2} (3,295/sq mi)

Languages
  - Official: Odia
- Time zone: UTC+5:30 (IST)
- Vehicle registration: OD-01
- Website: odisha.gov.in

Nilagiri is a town and a Notified Area Council in Balasore district in the Indian state of Odisha.

== History ==
Nilgiri is a very small town but replete with rich history and heritage. Its history can be traced back to the Palaeolithic age. Its modern history is known for the growing consciousness of democracy and self-rule. At the dawn of the 20th century, peasants began to rise against the despotic king but such uprisings were crushed with brutal methods. However, those uprisings gained momentum with able leadership and led to the first peasant movement in India.

Odisha freedom fighters like Balaram Raj, Shyamsundar Parida, Kailashchandra Mohanty, Banamali Das, Baishnab Patnaik, Kashinath Mohapatra, Brundaban Chandra Sarangi, Satish Chandra Das and Nanda Kishore Patnaik violently fought against the local prince and forced him to surrender to newly formed Indian National Government. This was the beginning of the process of 576 princely states joining the Republic of India and thus the making of modern political India. In Odisha, people of Nilagiri celebrate this as "The Victorious Uprising of Nilagiri".

== Tourist attraction ==
Panchalingeshwar is located approximately 10 km from Nilagiri and 30 km from Baleswar. The temple has the five Lingams of "Lord Shiva" and a waterfall on a hillside. Tourists and spiritual people visit the site to the touch the Shiva Linga located in a pit under the waterfall.

There is a state tourism shelter Pantha Nivas in Panchalingeswara for the tourists coming from outside. Panchalingeswara is surrounded by thick greenery and hillocks. Branches of the natural spring flow through the hill range which add more attraction to this place.

There is a famous Jagannatha Temple in Nilagiri which is one of the prominent Jagannnath temples of Odisha. Lord Jagannath, Balabhadra and Subhadra are worshipped here. Every year Ratha Yatra is observed with all the cults of the gods.

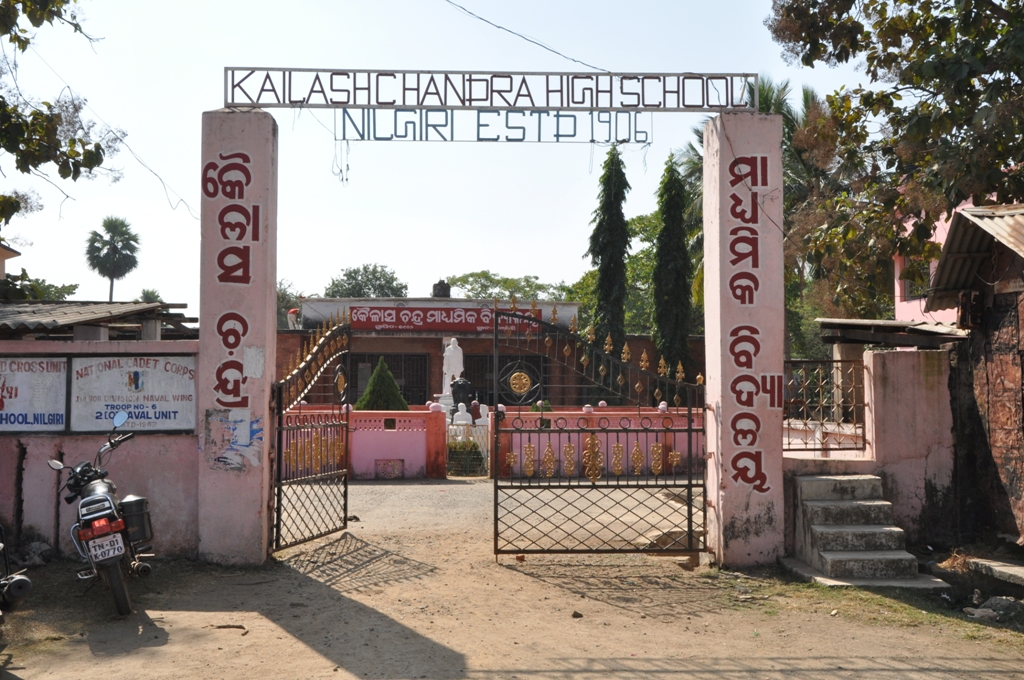
K.C. Highschool

Ajodhya is located 15 km from Nilgiri. It has 8th to 9th-century temple ruins, Buddhist and Jainism relics, and articles which are shown in the museum established by Government of Odisha at Ajodhya and Maa Marichee Temple.

== Education ==
There are two high schools, K.C. High School and R.T. High School in the heart of Nilagiri. Saraswati Shishu Mandir, RKRS, and Nilagiri English Medium schools are some of the best private schools. Nilagiri College, Women's College and Baba Panchalingeswar College are three colleges that impart higher education in the area.

"Santaragadia" mostly known as a place-based education, sometimes called pedagogy of place, place-based learning, experiential education, community-based education, education for sustainability, environmental education or more rarely, service learning, is an educational philosophy developed initially by The Oriya Society.

== Geography ==
Nilagiri is located at 21.46°N 86.77°E. It has an average elevation of 23 m (75 ft). The area mainly comprises hills and plateaus with Laterite being the main soil type. Nilagiri receives rain from the Monsoon; while summer is humid, winter is very dry.

== Demographics ==
Historical population
Year	Pop.	±%
1991	12,800	—
2001	14,757	+15.3%
2011	17,264	+17.0%
Source: Census of India

As of 2011 India census, Nilagiri had a population of 17,264 of which 8825 are males constituting 51% of the population and 8439 are females constituting 49% of the total population. Nilagiri has an average literacy rate of 77.46%, higher than the national average of 72.87%: male literacy is 83.21%, and female literacy is 71.47%. In Nilagiri, 12.12% of the population is under 6 years of age.

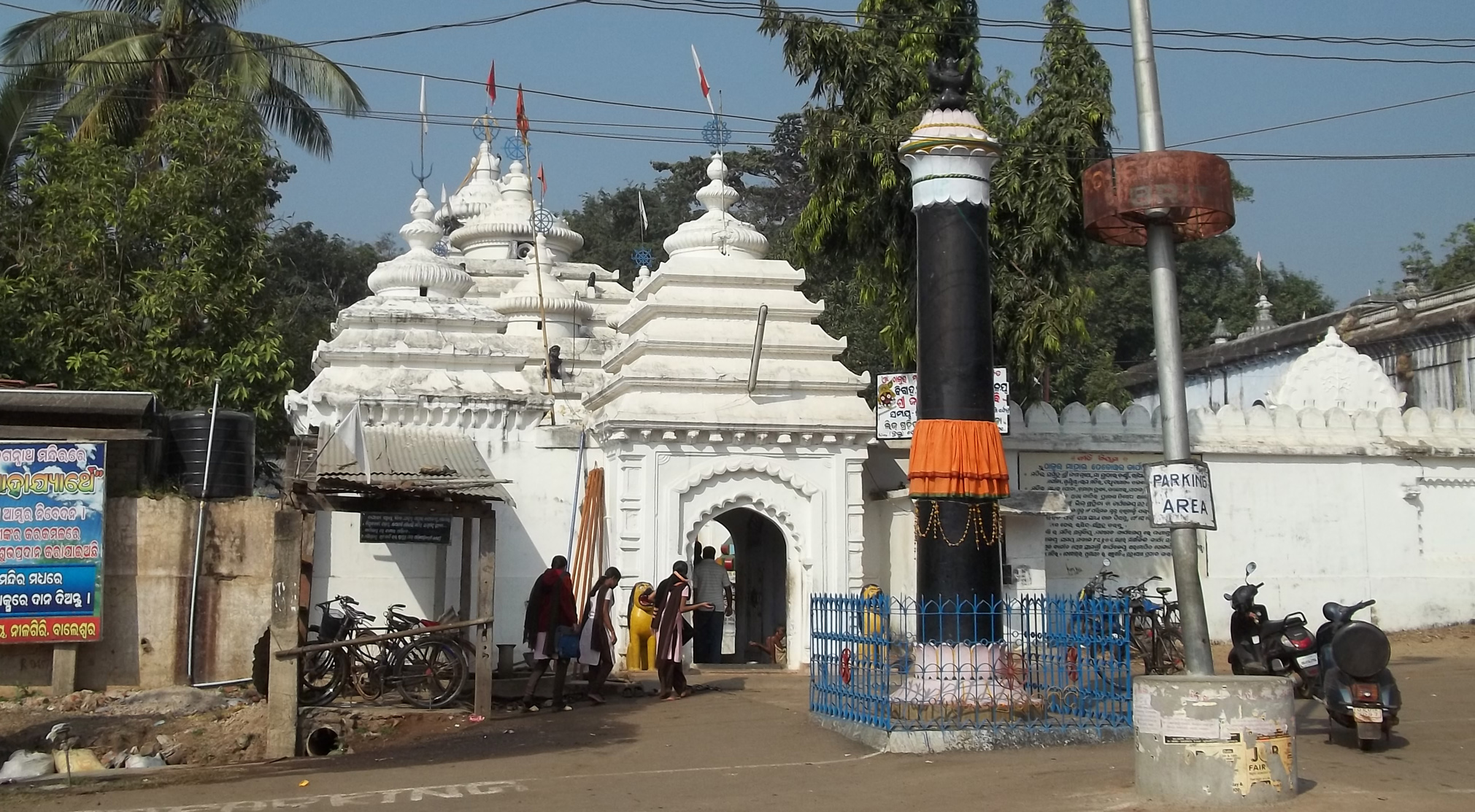
Jagannatha Temple Nilagiri

== Politics ==
Current MLA from Nilgiri Assembly constituency is Sukanta Kumar Nayak of BJP, who won the seat in State elections in 2014. He is from village Sangrampur. Previous MLAs from this seat were Pratap Chandra Sarangi (BJP) 2004, Pradipta Panda of CPI(M) in 2000, Akshaya Kumar Acharya representing INC in 1995 and Samarendra Narayan Das INC representing INC(I) in 1980, Chittaranjan Sarangi as independent candidate in 1990, Sukumar Nayak of INC in 1985, Rajendra Chandra Mardaraj of JNP in 1977.

Nilgiri is part of Balasore (Lok Sabha constituency).

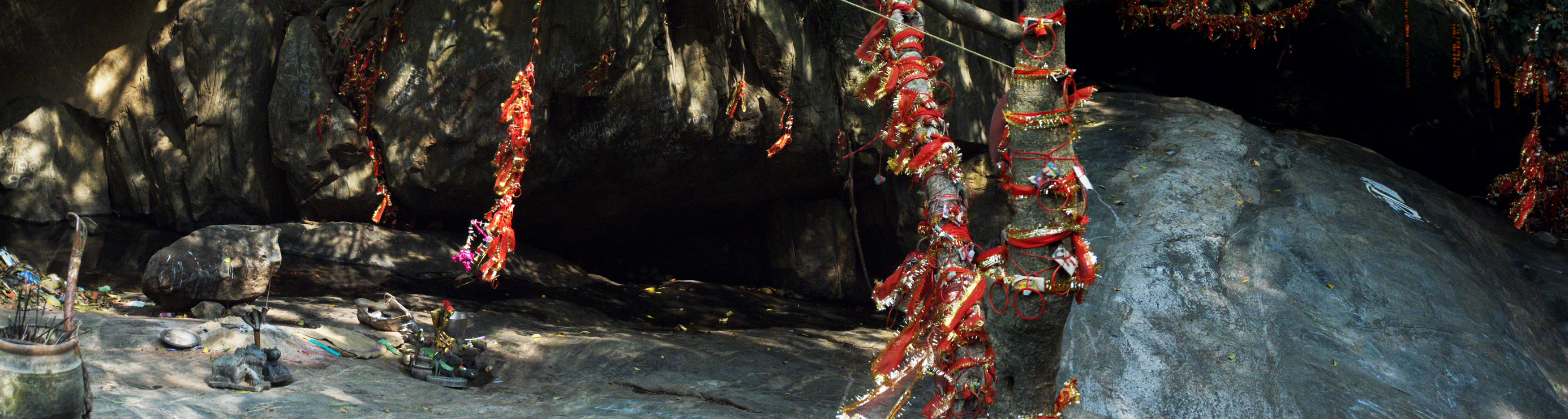
Panchalingeswara Temple
