= Ekamra-Bhubaneswar Assembly constituency =

Constituency of the Odisha legislative assembly in India

Coordinates: 20.277°N 85.841°E

Ekamra-Bhubaneswar
- Constituency No. 114 for the Odisha Legislative Assembly
- Ekamra-Bhubaneswar Assembly constituency in Khordha district

Constituency details
- Country: India
- Region: East India
- State: Odisha
- Division: Central Division
- District: Khordha
- Lok Sabha constituency: Bhubaneswar
- Established: 2009
- Total electors: 2,69,327 (Note: as on 2024) (Note: as data published by election commission)
- Reservation: None

Member of Legislative Assembly
- 17th Odisha Legislative Assembly
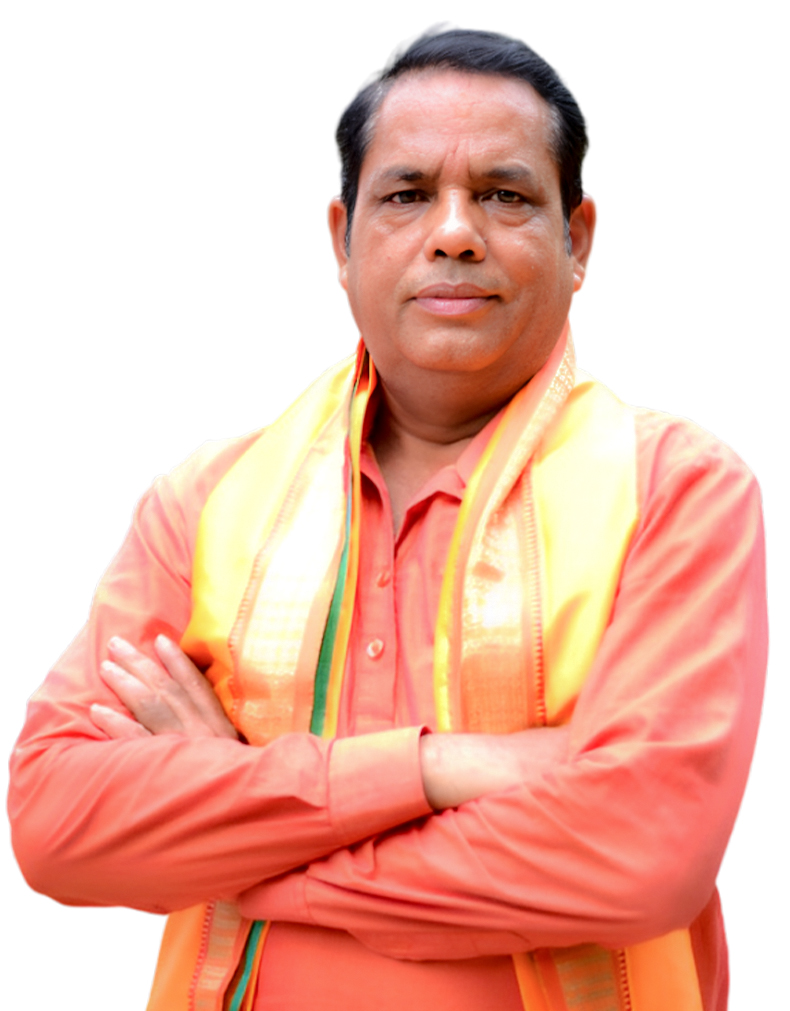
- Incumbent Babu Singh
- Party: Bharatiya Janata Party
- Elected year: 2024

Ekamra-Bhubaneswar is a Vidhan Sabha constituency of Khordha district, Odisha, India.

This constituency includes 5 Gram panchayats (Basuaghai, Itipur, Tikarapada, Dhauli and Sisupal) of Bhubaneswar block and Ward No.12, 14, 15 and 30 to 34 and Ward No. 38 to 47 of BMC.

The constituency was formed in 2008 Delimitation and went for polls in 2009 election.

== Elected members ==
Vote share of winning candidates
2024	49.03%
2019	57.07%
2014	57.86%
2009	65.63%

Since its formation in 2009, 4 elections were held till date.

List of members elected from Ekamra-Bhubaneswar constituency is:

Year	Portrait	Member	Party
2024		Babu Singh	Bharatiya Janata Party
2019		Ashok Chandra Panda	Biju Janata Dal
2014		Ashok Chandra Panda	Biju Janata Dal
2009		Ashok Chandra Panda	Biju Janata Dal

== Election results ==
=== 2024 ===
Voting were held on 25 May 2024 in 3rd phase of Odisha Assembly Election & 6th phase of Indian General Election. Counting of votes was on 4 June 2024. In 2024 election, Bharatiya Janata Party candidate Babu Singh defeated Biju Janata Dal candidate Ashok Chandra Panda by a margin of 5,023 votes.

2024 Odisha Vidhan Sabha Election, Ekamra Bhubaneswar
Party	Candidate	Votes	%	±%
BJP	Babu Singh	74,884	49.03	▲13.76
BJD	Ashok Chandra Panda	69,861	45.74	▼11.33
INC	Prasanta Kumar Champati	5,482	3.59	▼1.57
NOTA	None of the above	987	0.65	▼0.12
Majority		5,023	3.29	
Turnout		1,52,727	56.71	
BJP gain from BJD				

=== 2019 ===
In 2019 election, Biju Janata Dal candidate Ashok Chandra Panda defeated Bharatiya Janata Party candidate Babu Singh by a margin of 28,657 votes.

2019 Vidhan Sabha Election, Ekamra-Bhubaneswar
Party	Candidate	Votes	%	±%
BJD	Ashok Chandra Panda	75,020	57.07	▼0.79
BJP	Babu Singh	46,363	35.27	▲9.21
INC	Rashmi Mohapatra	6,780	5.16	▼1.94
NOTA	None of the above	1,009	0.77	▼0.28
Majority		28,657	21.80	
Turnout		1,31,446	46.77	
BJD hold				

=== 2014 ===
In 2014 election, Biju Janata Dal candidate Ashok Chandra Panda defeated Bharatiya Janata Party candidate Amiya Dash by a margin of 36,476 votes.

2014 Vidhan Sabha Election, Ekamra-Bhubaneswar
Party	Candidate	Votes	%	±%
BJD	Ashok Chandra Panda	66,376	57.86	−
BJP	Amiya Dash	29,900	26.06	−
INC	Shivananda Ray	8,148	7.1	−
NOTA	None of the above	1204	1.05	−
Majority		36,476	31.80	−
Turnout		1,14,718	45.97	−
Registered electors		2,38,949		
BJD hold				

=== 2009 ===
In 2009 election, Biju Janata Dal candidate Ashok Chandra Panda defeated Indian National Congress candidate Pratap Kumar Jena by a margin of 43,450 votes.

2009 Vidhan Sabha Election, Ekamra-Bhubaneswar
Party	Candidate	Votes	%	±%
BJD	Ashok Chandra Panda	55,095	65.63	−
INC	Pratap Kumar Jena	11,645	13.87	−
BJP	Samir Mohanty	11,070	13.19	−
Majority		43,450	51.76 (Note: %of total valid votes)	−
Turnout		83,981	37.21	−
Registered electors		2,25,707		
BJD win (new seat)				
