= Jyoti Prakash Panigrahi =

Indian politician

Member of Odisha Legislative Assembly
- In office 2014–2024
- Preceded by: Parsuram Panigrahi
- Constituency: Simulia

Personal details
- Party: Biju Janata Dal
- Profession: Politician

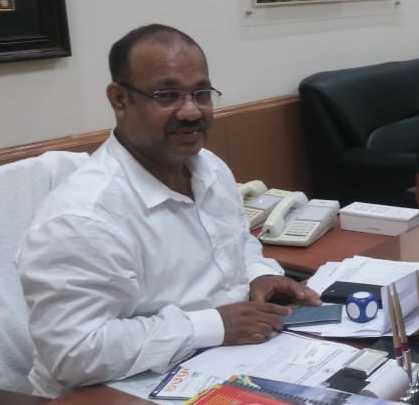
Panigrahi in 2019

Jyoti Prakash Panigrahi is an Indian politician from Odisha. He was a two time elected Member of the Odisha Legislative Assembly from 2014 and 2019, representing Simulia Assembly constituency as a Member of the Biju Janata Dal.

== Political career ==
Jyoti was twice elected as a Member of the Legislative Assembly from the Simulia Assembly Constituency, first in 2014 and again in 2019. In May 2024, he resigned from the Biju Janata Dal after the party did not nominate him as a candidate for the Simulia Assembly Constituency, instead selecting Subhasini Sahoo, who subsequently lost the election to the Bharatiya Janata Party's candidate, Padma Lochan Panda. However, immediately after his resignation, the Biju Janata Dal did not accept it and appointed him as the District President of Balasore district.

== See also ==
- 2014 Odisha Legislative Assembly election
- Odisha Legislative Assembly
