= Manas Kumar Dutta =

Indian politician

Member of Odisha Legislative Assembly
- Incumbent
- Assumed office 4 June 2024
- Preceded by: Swarup Kumar Das
- Constituency: Balasore

Personal details
- Party: Bharatiya Janata Party
- Profession: Politician

Manas Kumar Dutta is an Indian politician. He was elected to the Odisha Legislative Assembly from Balasore as a member of the Bharatiya Janata Party.
