= Basudevpur Assembly constituency =

Assembly constituency in Odisha

Coordinates: 21.13°N 86.75°E

Basudevpur
- Constituency No. 45 for the Odisha Legislative Assembly

Constituency details
- Country: India
- Region: East India
- State: Odisha
- Division: Central Division
- District: Bhadrak
- Lok Sabha constituency: Bhadrak
- Established: 1961
- Total electors: 2,72,821 (Note: as on 2024) (Note: as data published by election commission)
- Reservation: None

Member of Legislative Assembly
- 17th Odisha Legislative Assembly
- Incumbent Ashok Kumar Das
- Party: Indian National Congress
- Elected year: 2024

Basudevpur is a Vidhan Sabha constituency of Bhadrak district, Odisha.

Area of this constituency includes Basudevpur, Basudevpur block and 7 GPs (Bhatapada, Saya, Bahabalpur, Sindol, Kolha, Mukundapur and Maharampur) of Tihidi block.

== Members of Legislative Assembly ==
Vote share of winning candidates
2024	39.11%
2019	42.37%
2014	46.46%
2009	48.49%
2004	51.01%
2000	55.04%
1995	44.94%
1990	54.44%
1985	48.48%
1980	47.55%
1977	53.66%

Since its formation in 1961, 15 elections were held till date.

List of members elected from Basudevpur constituency are:

Year	Member	Party
2024	Ashok Kumar Das	Indian National Congress
2019	Bishnubrata Routray	Biju Janata Dal
2014	Bijayshree Routray	Biju Janata Dal
2009	Bijayshree Routray	Biju Janata Dal
2004	Bijayshree Routray	Biju Janata Dal
2000	Bijayshree Routray	Biju Janata Dal
1995	Bijayshree Routray	Janata Dal
1990	Bijayshree Routray	Janata Dal
1985	Madhusudan Panigrahi	Indian National Congress
1980	Jagabandhu Das	Indian National Congress (I)
1977	Nilamani Routray	Janata Party
1974	Jagabandhu Das	Indian National Congress
1971	Nilamani Routray	Utkal Congress
1967	Harekrushna Mahatab	Orissa Jana Congress
1961	Nilamani Routray	Indian National Congress

== Election Results ==
=== 2024 ===
Voting were held on 1 June 2024 in 4th phase of Odisha Assembly Election & 7th phase of Indian General Election. Counting of votes was on 4 June 2024. In 2024 election, Indian National Congress candidate Ashok Kumar Das defeated Biju Janata Dal candidate Bishnubrata Routray by a margin of 631 votes.

2024 Odisha Vidhan Sabha Election, Basudevpur
Party	Candidate	Votes	%	±%
INC	Ashok Kumar Das	77,843	39.11	▲1.87
BJD	Bishnubrata Routray	77,212	38.79	▼3.58
BJP	Banikalyan Mohanty	42,278	21.24	▲2.04
NOTA	None of the above	555	0.28	▼0.12
Majority		631	0.32	
Turnout		1,99,051	72.96	
INC gain from BJD				

=== 2019 ===
In 2019 election, Biju Janata Dal candidate Bishnubrata Routray defeated Indian National Congress candidate Ashok Kumar Das by a margin of 9,581 votes.

2019 Odisha Vidhan Sabha Election, Basudevpur
Party	Candidate	Votes	%	±%
BJD	Bishnubrata Routray	78,963	42.37	
INC	Ashok Kumar Das	69,382	37.23	
BJP	Madhabananda Mallick	35,777	19.2	
NOTA	None of the above	744	0.4	
Majority		9,581	5.14	
Turnout		1,86,355	74	
BJD hold				

=== 2014 ===
In 2014 election, Biju Janata Dal candidate Bijayshree Routray defeated Indian National Congress candidate Madhabananda Mallick by a margin of 6,506 votes.

2014 Vidhan Sabha Election, Basudevpur
Party	Candidate	Votes	%	±%
BJD	Bijayshree Routray	77,781	46.46	2.03
INC	Madhabananda Mallick	71,275	42.57	1.24
BJP	Dinabandhu Pati	15,339	9.16	2.81
NOTA	None of the above	710	0.42	−
Majority		6,506	3.89	0.79
Turnout		1,67,143	76.78	6.72
Registered electors		2,18,048		
BJD hold				

=== 2009 ===
In 2009 election, Biju Janata Dal candidate Bijayshree Routray defeated Indian National Congress candidate Madhabananda Mallick by a margin of 6,840 votes.

2009 Vidhan Sabha Election, Basudevpur
Party	Candidate	Votes	%	±%
BJD	Bijayshree Routray	70,020	48.49	−
INC	Madhabananda Mallick	64,016	43.88	−
BJP	Ashok Kumar Sahu	9,277	6.35	−
Majority		6,840	4.68 (Note: %of total valid votes)	−
Turnout		1,46,153	70.06	−
BJD hold				
