= Madanmohan Dutta =

Indian politician (died 2020)

Madanmohan Dutta was an Indian politician. He was elected to the Odisha Legislative Assembly from Balasore constituency in the 2019 Odisha Legislative Assembly election as a member of the Bharatiya Janata Party. Dutta died of cardiac arrest on 17 June 2020. Dutta was admitted in Bhubaneswar was undergoing liver-related ailments.
