= Balasore Assembly constituency =

Constituency of the Odisha legislative assembly in India

Coordinates: 21.50°N 86.91°E

Balasore
- Constituency No. 38 for the Odisha Legislative Assembly

Constituency details
- Country: India
- Region: East India
- State: Odisha
- Division: Central Division
- District: Balasore
- Lok Sabha constituency: Balasore
- Established: 1951
- Total electors: 2,29,852 (Note: as on 2024) (Note: as data published by election commission)
- Reservation: None

Member of Legislative Assembly
- 17th Odisha Legislative Assembly
- Incumbent Manas Kumar Dutta
- Party: Bharatiya Janata Party
- Elected year: 2024

Balasore is a Vidhan Sabha constituency of Balasore district, Odisha.

Area of this constituency includes Balasore and 18 GPs (Kasipada, Rasulpur, Srirampur, Kasafal, Sartha, Bahabalpur, Chhanua, Haladipada, Olandasaragan, Odangi, Nagaram, Buanl, Sindhia, Gopinathpur, Parikhi, Patrapada, Kuradiha and Srikona) of Balasore block.

== Elected members ==
Vote share of winning candidates
2024	50.90%
2020 (bypoll)	51.80%
2019	47.46%
2014	32.82%
2009	45.42%
2004	47.36%
2000	40.94%
1995	46.37%
1990	86.56%
1985	47.38%
1980	39.33%
1977	49.58%

Since its formation in 1951, 18 elections were held till date including one bypoll in 2020.

List of members elected from Balasore constituency are:

Year	Member	Party
2024	Manas Kumar Dutta	Bharatiya Janata Party
2020 (bypoll) (Note: Death of Madanmohan Dutta)	Swarup Kumar Das	Biju Janata Dal
2019	Madanmohan Dutta	Bharatiya Janata Party
2014	Jiban Pradip Dash	Biju Janata Dal
2009	Jiban Pradip Dash	Biju Janata Dal
2004	Arun Dey	Odisha Gana Parisad
2000	Jiban Pradip Dash	Bharatiya Janata Party
1995	Arun Dey	Independent politician
1990	Arun Dey	Communist Party of India
1985	Gopanarayan Das	Indian National Congress
1980	Arun Dey	Communist Party of India
1977	Kartik Chandra Rout	Janata Party
1974	Arun Dey	Communist Party of India
1971	Priyanath Nandy	Indian National Congress (R)
1967	Rabindra Mohan Das	Praja Socialist Party
1961	Bijoy Krushna De	Indian National Congress
1957	Rabindra Mohan Das	Praja Socialist Party
1951	Surendra Nath Das	Indian National Congress

== Election results ==
=== 2024 ===
Voting were held on 1 June 2024 in 4th phase of Odisha Assembly Election & 7th phase of Indian General Election. Counting of votes was on 4 June 2024. In 2024 election, Bharatiya Janata Party candidate Manas Kumar Dutta defeated Biju Janata Dal candidate Swarup Kumar Das by a margin of 28,626 votes.

2024 Odisha Vidhan Sabha Election, Balasore
Party	Candidate	Votes	%	±%
BJP	Manas Kumar Dutta	89,360	50.90	
BJD	Swarup Kumar Das	60,734	34.59	
INC	Monalisa Lenka	19,259	10.97	
NOTA	None of the above	698	0.40	
Majority		28,626	16.31	
Turnout		1,75,560	76.38	
BJP gain from BJD				

=== 2020 Bypoll ===
In 2020 bye-election, Biju Janata Dal candidate Swarup Kumar Das defeated Bharatiya Janata Party candidate Manas Kumar Dutta by a margin of 13,351 votes.

2020 Odisha Legislative Assembly by-election : Balasore
Party	Candidate	Votes	%	±%
BJD	Swarup Kumar Das	84,097	51.8	
BJP	Manas Kumar Dutta	70,746	43.58	
INC	Mamata Kundu	4,983	3.07	
NOTA	None of the above	700	0.43	
Majority		13,351	8.22	
Turnout		1,64,458	71.33	
BJD gain from BJP				

=== 2019 ===
In 2019 election, Bharatiya Janata Party candidate Madanmohan Dutta defeated Biju Janata Dal candidate Jiban Pradip Das by a margin of 13,406 votes.

2019 Vidhan Sabha Election, Balasore
Party	Candidate	Votes	%	±%
BJP	Madanmohan Dutta	74,815	47.26	
BJD	Jiban Pradip Dash	61,409	38.79	
INC	Manas Ranjan Das Pattnaik	19,704	12.45	
NOTA	None of the above	668	0.42	
Majority		13,406	8.46	
Turnout		1,58,313	80.83	
BJP gain from BJD				

=== 2014 ===
In 2014 election, Biju Janata Dal candidate Jiban Pradip Das defeated Bharatiya Janata Party candidate Madanmohan Dutta by a margin of 9,791 votes.

2014 Vidhan Sabha Election, Balasore
Party	Candidate	Votes	%	±%
BJD	Jiban Pradip Das	47,615	32.82	−12.6
BJP	Madanmohan Dutta	37,824	26.07	20.03
INC	Arun Dey	28,650	19.75	10.55
Independent	Manas Ranjan Das Pattnaik	24,720	17.04	
NOTA	None of the above	827	0.51	−
Majority		9,791	6.75	
Turnout		1,45,082	74.08	8.83
Registered electors		1,95,846		
BJD hold				

=== 2009 ===
In 2009 election, Biju Janata Dal candidate Jiban Pradip Dash defeated Independent Anup Kumar Das by a margin of 13,490 votes.

2009 Vidhan Sabha Election, Balasore
Party	Candidate	Votes	%	±%
BJD	Jiban Pradip Dash	55,710	45.42	−
Independent	Anup Kumar Das	42,220	34.42	−
INC	Subhankar Mohapatra	11,282	9.20	−
BJP	Sanjay Kumar Patra	7,414	6.04	−
Majority		13,490	11.00 (Note: %of total valid votes)	−
Turnout		1,22,680	65.25	−
BJD gain from Odisha Gana Parisad				
