= Saptamatruka Temple =

Hindu temple in Jajpur, Odisha, India

Coordinates: 20.834753°N 86.332854°E

Religion
- Affiliation: Hinduism
- District: Jajpur
- Deity: Goddesses Saptamatrikas

Location
- Location: Jajpur
- State: Odisha
- Country: India
- Interactive map of Saptamatruka Temple

Saptamatruka Temple is a Hindu temple dedicated to the Seven Mother Goddesses in Hindu tradition. It is located in Jajpur in the Indian state of Odisha. Jajpur is one of Odisha's major centres of Shakta worship, centered on Goddess Biraja. It forms part of the ancient religious landscape of Jajpur, traditionally known as Biraja Kshetra, the sacred centre of Goddess Biraja. Another Saptamatruka temple is located near the Markandeshwar Temple on the banks of the Markandeshwar Tank in the city of Puri.

== Presiding Hindu goddesses ==
According to Hindu tradition, the Saptamatrukas (Seven Mother Goddesses) emerged from the divine energies of various primary Hindu deities to assist Goddess Durga in her battle against the demons Nishumbha and Shumbha, as described in chapter 8 of the Devi Mahatmya. They represent the divine feminine powers (Shaktis) associated with their respective male deities. The Devi Mahatmya is a part of the larger text known as the Markandeya Purana, and chapter 8 of the Devi Mahatmya is known as "the slaying of Raktabija". The Saptamatrukas are traditionally identified in the following sequence:

1. Brahmani: the Shakti of Brahma
2. Maheswari: the Shakti of Shiva
3. Kaumari: the Shakti of Kartikeya
4. Vaishnavi: the Shakti of Vishnu
5. Varahi: the Shakti of Varaha
6. Indrani: the Shakti of Indra
7. Chamunda: the slayer of demons Chanda and Munda

== History ==
The Saptamatruka shrine at Puri is also attributed to the Somavamsi period, approximately the 10th century CE, based on its iconographic and stylistic features. According to the Madala Panji, the traditional chronicle of the Jagannath Temple, King Bhimakeshari (Bhimaratha), a ruler of the Somavamsi dynasty, was a devotee of the Goddess and is traditionally credited with installing the seven Mother Goddesses, known as Sata Bhauni, near Markandeswar Tank. Nitei Dhobani and Pitei Sautuni were two Tantric worshippers traditionally associated with the Saptamatruka shrine at Markandeshwar Sahi in Puri. They were devoted worshippers of the Seven Mother Goddesses and revered Jagannath and Goddess Vimala as Bhairava and Bhairavi, respectively.

== See also ==
- Budha Ganesha Temple
- Yajna Varaha Temple
- Biraja Temple
- Markandeshwar Temple
