= Budha Ganesha Temple =

Hindu Temple

Coordinates: 20.857723°N 86.336424°E

Budha Ganesha Temple or the temple of Ganesha in his old age form is found near the Dasashwamedh Ghat of Baitarani River in Jajpur. It is very near to Yajna Varaha Temple.

== Archaeology ==
The temple is built in the Kalingan order. Total temple is constructed using Khanolite stone and recent lime plaster is done to protect the sculpture. Various loose sculpture of Vishnu, Mahishamardini along with Jain Tirthankara Shantinath is also found. On the basis of all the temple can be said that it was built during 11th century AD. The temple also consists of Rekha, Pidha structure like other temples of Sonepur and Bhubaneswar. Ganesh Chaturthi is the most popular festival here.
