= Varahanatha Temple =

Hindu temple dedicated to the god Varaha in India

Varahanatha Temple Complex Adi Varaha Temple
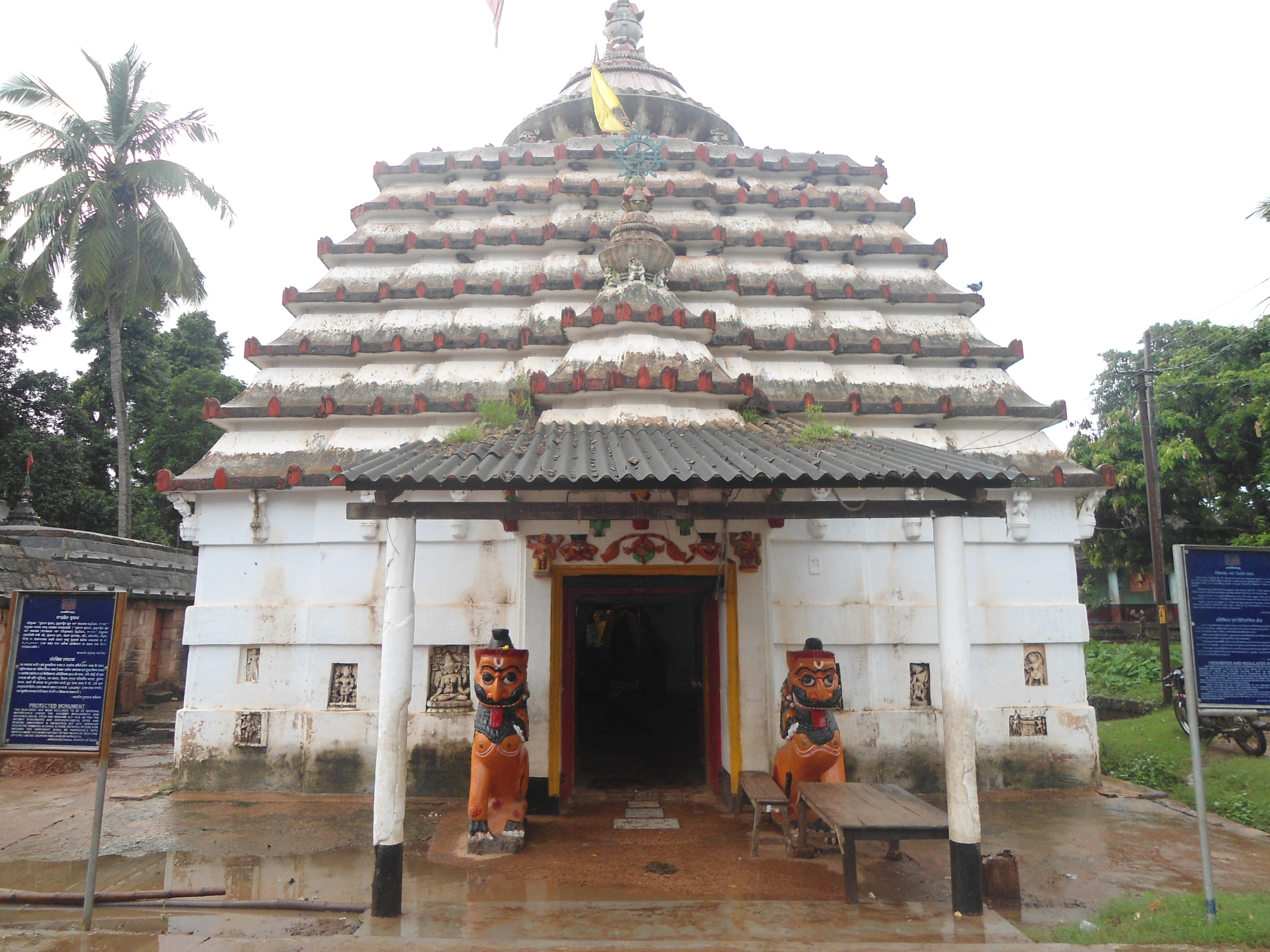
- Varahanatha Temple (Jajpur)

- Location in Odisha

Religion
- Affiliation: Hinduism
- District: Jajpur
- Deity: Varaha

Location
- Location: Jajpur
- State: Odisha
- Country: India
- Coordinates: 20°51′30.2″N 86°20′08″E

Architecture
- Type: Kalinga architecture (Deula)
- Completed: 15-16th century

The Varahanatha Temple, also known as Yajna Varaha Temple, is a Hindu temple complex, located on the left bank of the Vaitarani River on an island formed by the river, in Jajpur, Odisha, India. The main shrine is dedicated to Varaha, the boar avatar of the god Vishnu. Built in 15-16th century, the temple is constructed in Kalinga architectural style. Besides the central Varaha shrine, there are numerous subordinate shrines to deities like Shiva, Vishnu, Vimala and others.

== Geography ==
The temple complex is located at an elevation of 15 feet (4.6 m), on an island created by two branches of the Vaitarani River, about 1 kilometre (0.62 mi) from Jajpur bus station. The island is opposite to the Dasaswamedha ghat, which is also a famous pilgrimage centre. The temple faces the threat of floods from the river that surrounds the island.

Jajpur is a historic town which is called as Biraja Kshetra – home of the sacred temple of goddess Biraja – and was the capital city of the Somavamshi or Kesari dynasty. The town is given the name of Somavamshi King, Jajati Kesari`who ruled here in early 10th century.

== Legend ==
According to a local legend, when the creator-god Brahma was performing Ashvamedha yajna (sacrifice), he realised that the Vedas (scriptures) were stolen. He then requested Vishnu for help to retrieve them. As soon as the yajna was completed, Vishnu emerged from the sacrificial fire in the form of a boar – his avatar Varaha – with the stolen scriptures. From that time onwards, the location of the yajna came to be known as Jajfiapura or Jajpur. In some versions, Brahma completes ten Ashvamedha yajnas, after which Varaha appears. The place is called Gada Kshetra after the gada (mace) used by Varaha.

== History ==
On the basis of the architecture and structures enshrined in the temple, it is estimated to be built during the 15–16th century under the Suryavamshi Gajapati rule. The chronicle Madala Panji attributes the building of the temple to Prataparudra Deva (reign: 1497–1540). Another legend attributes to the king's head priest, Kasi Mishra. The Hindu saint Chaitanya Mahaprabhu (1486–1534), who was instrumental in establishing the Chaitnaya Math and propagated Vaishnavism (worship of Vishnu and related deities) visited this temple, on his way from Puri in 1510. The temple was renovated by Raghoji I Bhonsle (reign: 1739–1755), the Maratha ruler of Nagpur kingdom. It is a protected monument maintained by the Archaeological Survey of India.

== Architectural features ==
=== Main Varaha Temple ===
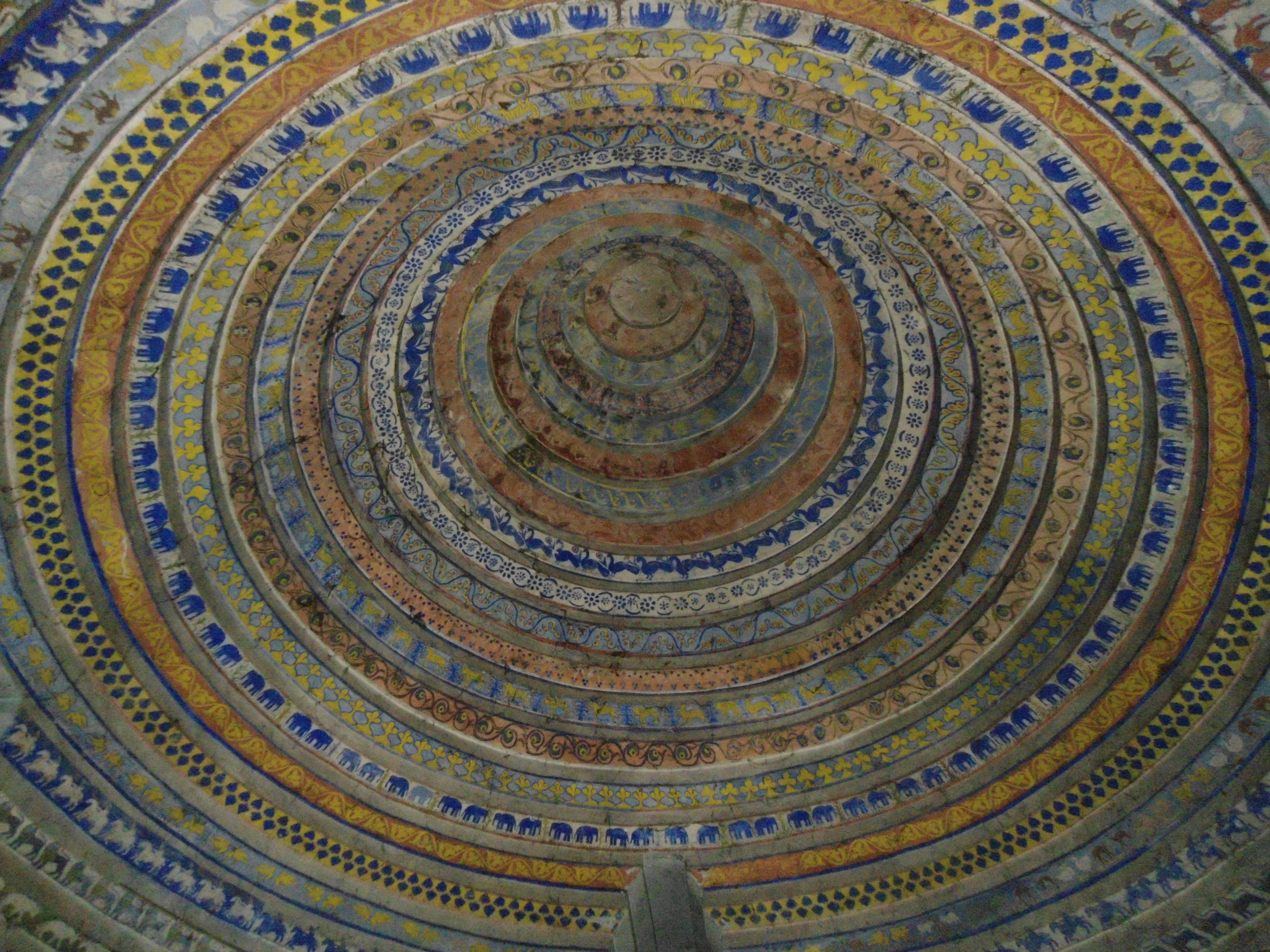
Painted ceiling in Varaha shrine.

The icon of Shveta Varaha, the white incarnation of Varaha, is the principal deity of the temple. The temple faces east and is located in a 30-by-40-metre (98 by 131 ft) plot. The temple structure is built over a plinth of 25.30-by-12-metre (83.0 by 39.4 ft). The height of the temple is 22 metres (72 ft). Built in Kalinga architectural style, the temple has three components, namely the vimana (building containing the sanctum), the antarala (a small chamber between the sanctum and the hall) and the jagamohana (assembly hall). The vimana is a Rekha deula (a tall building with a shape of sugar loaf) and the jagamohana is a pidha deula (square building with a pyramid-shaped roof). The Vimana as well as the jagamohana are square in shape. The temple is built in ashlar masonry with Khandolite stone, the exposed surfaces are plastered and given a white wash of lime. The outer wall is panchanga bada, that is, divided into 5 parts (from base to top): pabhaga, talajangha, bandhana, upara jangha and baranda.

The sanctum has two images of Varaha, a Lakshmi (consort of Vishnu) image and a Jagannath (a regional form of Vishnu) image. The Jagannath image is made of wood, while the rest are made of chlorite. The talajangha of the vimana exhibits erotic sculptures, mother and child, and amorous couples. Musicians, devotees and Yamuna (a river goddess) are carved on the upara jangha. The pinnacle is Pancharatha (containing five Pagas or segments) in nature and decorated with figures of the udyotasimhas (lion with lolling tongue) and gajasimhas (the lion riding an elephant), all on central pagas (raha), except the main paga which bears a Varaha image.

The jagamohana and antarala have modern paintings with floral and animal or bird motifs. The jagamohana has a Garuda pillar. In the jagamohana, the sculptural images of dvarapala (gate keepers) of the Shaiva (related to the god Shiva) tradition, the head of Brahma and Astikajaratkaru (the goddess Manasa cradles her child Astika or a dead man who is revived) fixed to the walls. The niches in the talajangha of the jagamohana has images of the predominantly Buddhist deity Prajnaparamita, Vishnu, Kalyanasundara (marriage scene of Shiva and Parvati), Narasimha (avatar of Vishnu), Ganga (the goddess of the Ganges), Varaha, Parvati (consort of Shiva), Giridhari Govardhana (a form of Krishna - avatar of Vishnu) and dancing panels. The brackets supporting the gandi (temple pinnacle) have erotic sculptures of male and female figures and figurines of bharabahaka (goblins supporting the roof) and mother and child.

The temple also has independent sculptures of different ages, fixed at random. Deity sculptures in the temple include Ganesha (god of wisdom), Vamana (avatar of Vishnu), Vishnu, Narasimha, Brahma, Uma-Maheshavara (Shiva with Parvati) and Dhyani Buddha (a Buddhist image).

=== Hara-Gouri temple ===
To the south-east of the Varaha Temple is the Hara-Gouri Temple. This shrine, facing south, is a square-shaped pidha deula vimana, built in Kalinga style but not well preserved. The presiding deity is Ekamukhi Shiva Linga (an iconic image of Shiva) mounted on a circular yoni called as Hara-Gouri Shiva. It is dated to the first half of the 15th century. The small shrine measures 3.2 by 2.9 metres (10.5 by 9.5 ft) with a partial visible height of 4 metres (13 ft) as the rest of the shrine is below the ground. The only ornamentation on the northern face of the shrine is a lion head. The front face of the vimana is fitted with sculptures of Vishnu and a four-armed Ganesha. The temple is built with Khandolite stones in Ashlar masonry and lime plastered. During the rainy months and floods in the river, the sanctum, which is below the ground level, gets submerged.

=== Bimala Temple ===
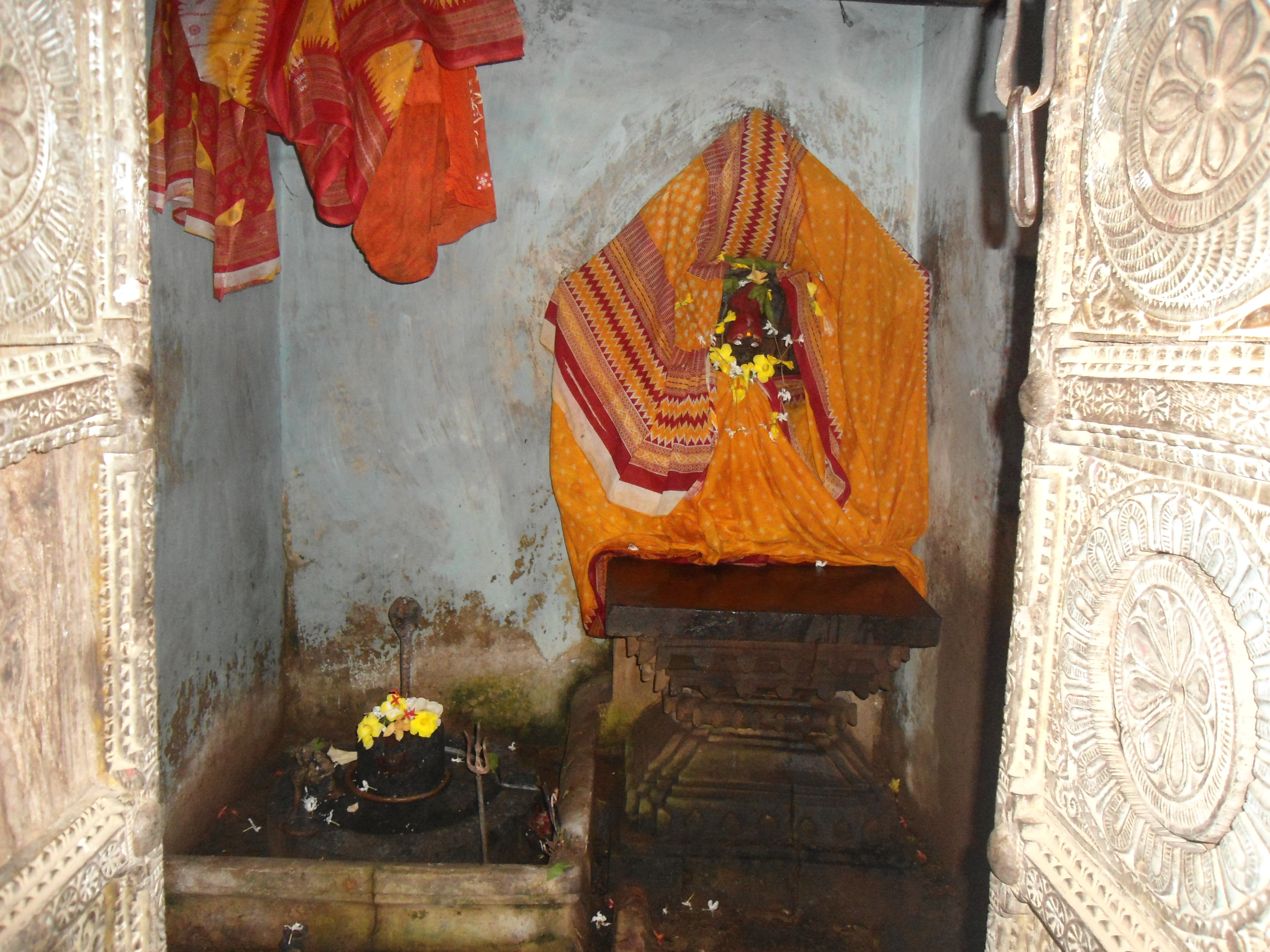
Bimala shrine

The Bimala (Vimala) Temple, located to the south of the Varaha Temple, is an east-facing small shrine in the complex. It has a rekha-deula vimana and the front porch has columns. The presiding deity in this shrine is goddess Vimala with a Shiva linga. It was built in early 16th century during Suryavamshi Gajapati rule. The shrine has a plan of 5.2 metres (17 ft) square and its height is 9 metres (30 ft) and is in two blocks. The arched porch in the front is of rectangular plan. The pinnacle of the temple is as per pancharatra style while the style is in the triangabada (the outer wall divided into 3 sections). The temple has been built with Khandolite stones in Ashlar masonry. On each of the faces of the temple, lions are carved while at the entrance images of Matrumurti and Hanuman are fixed. The shrine is poorly maintained.

=== Kharakhia Varaha Temple ===
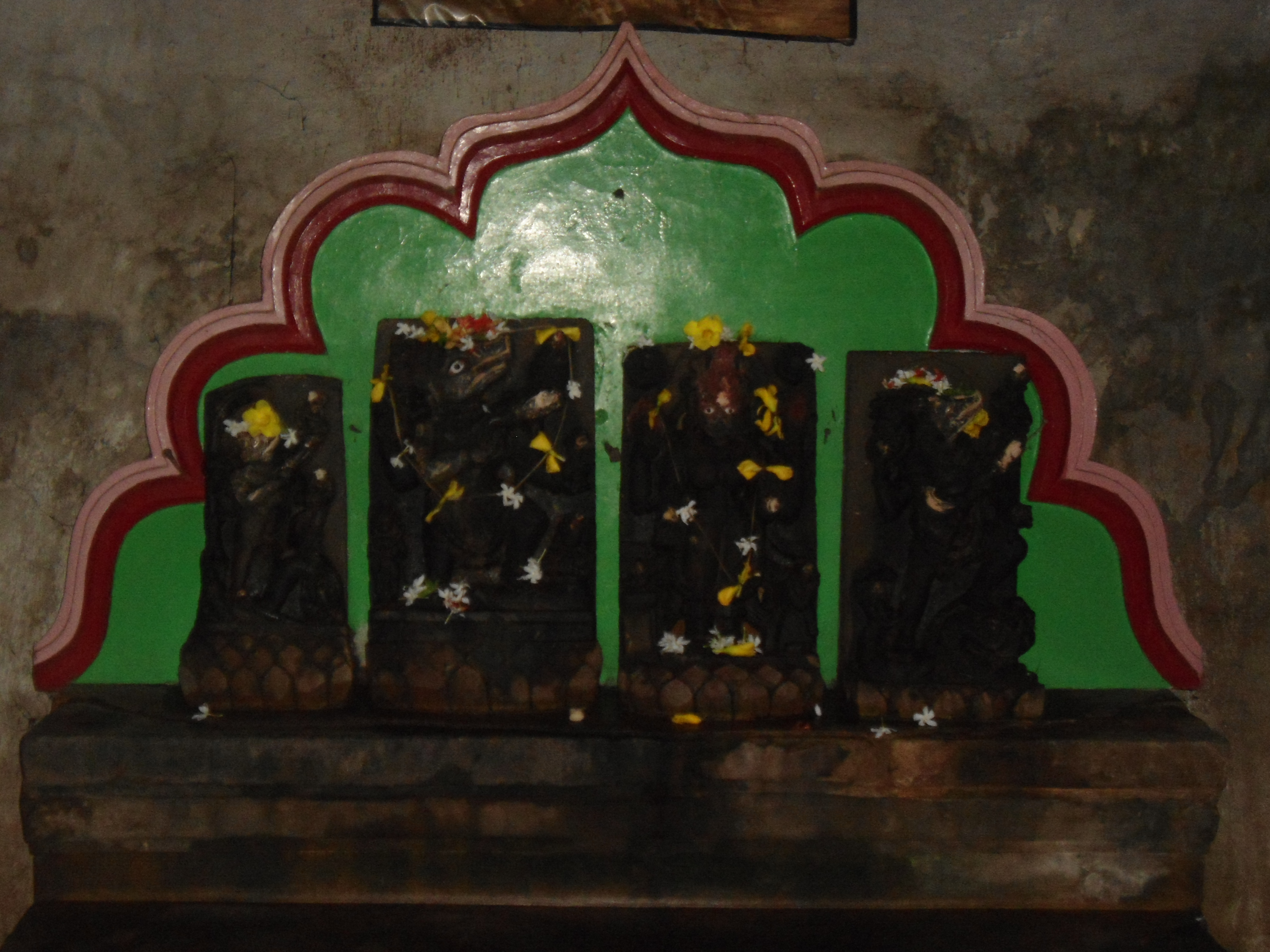
Kharakhia Varaha shrine

Another shrine within the complex is the Kharakhia Varaha Temple, located to the south of the main Varahanatha Temple. The north-facing shrine has three icons of Varaha, which represents Varaha of the main temple when it remains closed, and an icon of Lakshmi. The original temple is a pidha-deula. The original structure is dated to 15–16th century during the reign of Gajapati kings; this has been refurbished as a modern temple structure (with bricks and cement mortar) with measurements of 5.25 by 5.15 metres (17.2 by 16.9 ft) in plan with a height of 5 metres (16 ft). The front porch is in a rectangular shape and the vimana is square in plan in Kalinga style.

=== Muktesvara Temple ===
Mukteswara Temple is a small east-facing shrine within the complex about 20 metres (66 ft) to the south of the main temple of Varahanatha. It contains a Shiva linga fixed over a circular yoni. It is dated to early 16th century during the Gajapati rule. The square shrine is 3.4 by 3.4 metres (11 by 11 ft) in plan. It has a plain vada, half of which is buried, and as result during the rainy season and on account of the high flood level in the Vaitaranai River, the sanctum gets flooded. The vimana, which is square in plan, is of the pida-deula and is not well maintained. The temple is built with Khandolite stones set in Ashlar masonry and given a paint of white lime.

=== Other shrines ===
Other shrines in the complex are: Gadadhara Vishnu shrine, a shrine to the sun-god Surya, Kasi Biswanath temple (another Shiva shrine), Sri Chaitanya Pada Pitha (which has footprints of Chaitanya Mahaprabhu), Sunya Vedi and a temple of the goddess Chamunda.

Temple images
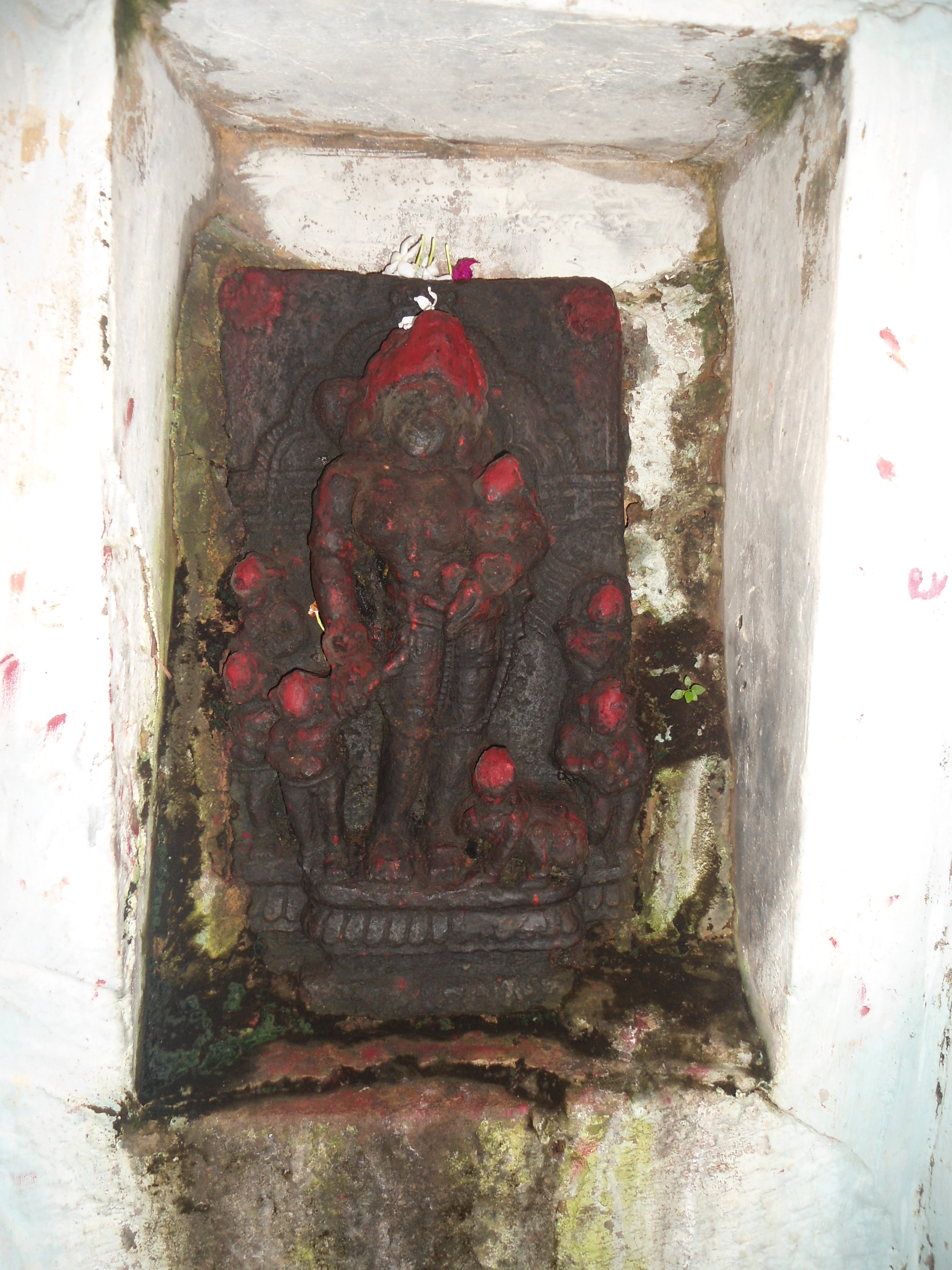
Parswa Devi

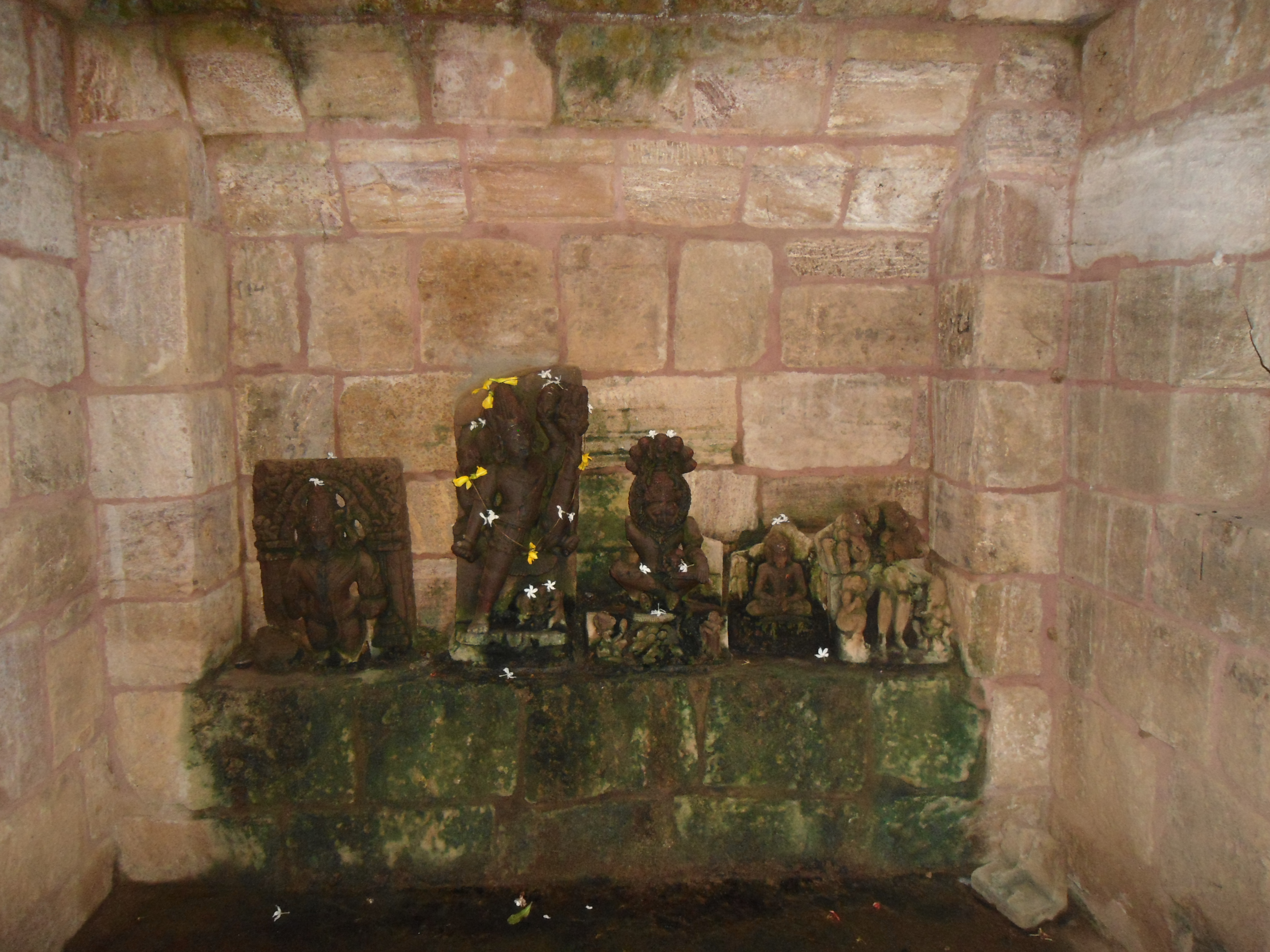
Mani Nageswari

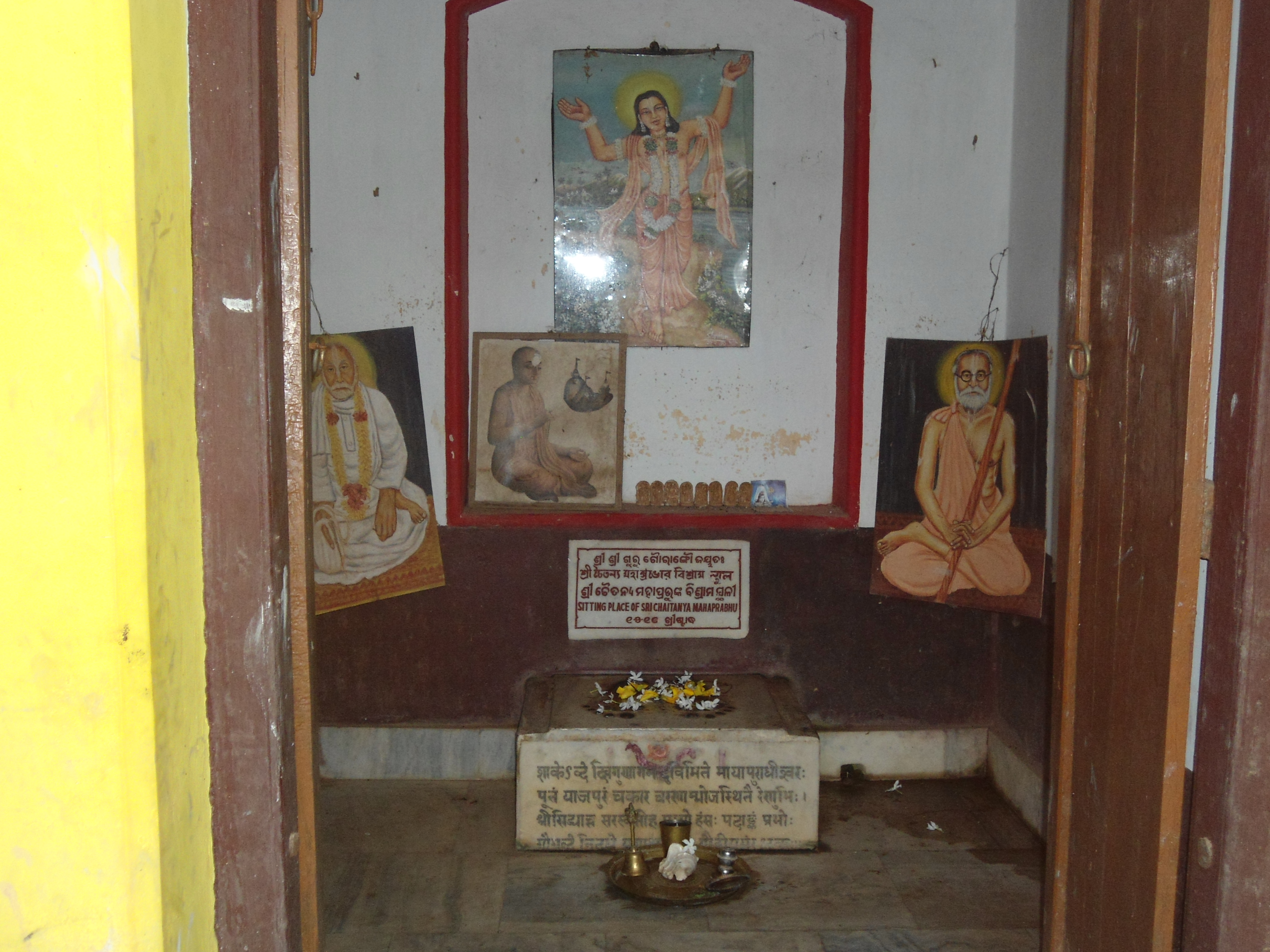
Shrine with foot prints of Chaitanya

== Festivals ==
The festivals held in the temple complex are the Chandana Yatra, Sunia, Kartika Purnima, Baula Amavasya, Maha Varuni Yatra, Mahashivaratri, and so forth.
