= Jajpurattus =

Scientific classification
- Kingdom: Animalia
- Phylum: Arthropoda
- Subphylum: Chelicerata
- Class: Arachnida
- Order: Araneae
- Infraorder: Araneomorphae
- Family: Salticidae
- Genus: Jajpurattus; Prószynski, 1992
- Species: J. incertus

Binomial name
- Jajpurattus incertus Prószyński, 1992

Genus of spiders

Jajpurattus is a spider genus of jumping spiders) found in India. Its single described species is Jajpurattus incertus.

== Name ==
The genus name is combined from Jajpur and the common ending for salticid genera -attus.
