= Biraja Temple =

Temple in India

- ମା ବିରଜା ମନ୍ଦିର
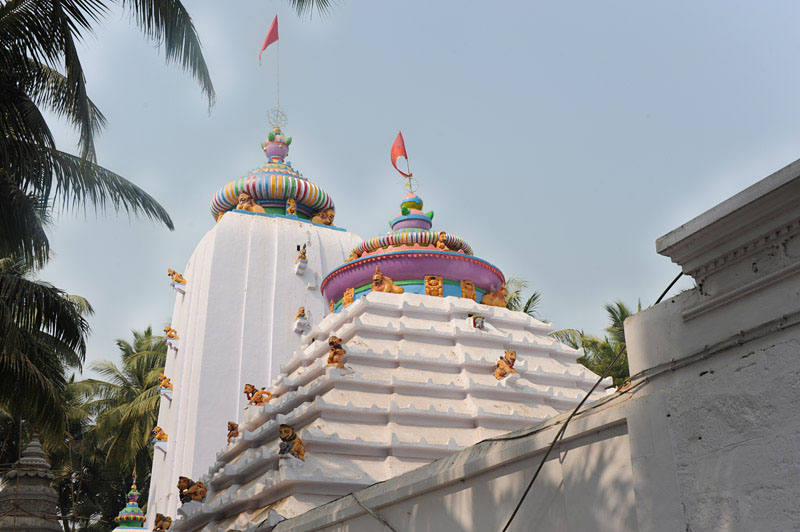
- Maa Biraja Temple

- Odisha

Religion
- Affiliation: Hinduism
- District: Jajpur
- Deity: Biraja
- Festivals: Durga Puja, Ratha Yatra

Location
- State: Odisha
- Country: India
- Coordinates: 20°50′1.55″N 86°20′17.32″E

Architecture
- Style: Kalinga architecture
- Completed: 11th century

The Biraja Temple, or Birija Kshetra, or Biraja Mandira (Odia: ବିରଜା ମନ୍ଦିର, romanized: Biråjā Måndirå), is a historic Hindu temple located in Jajpur (about 125 kilometres (78 mi) north of Bhubaneswar), Odisha, India. The present temple was built during the 11th century CE. The principal idol is Devi Durga, who is worshipped as Virajā/Birajā (Girijā), and the temple gave Jajpur the nicknames "Birajā Kṣētra" and "Birajā Pīṭha". The Durga idol has two hands (dwibhuja), spearing the chest of Mahishasura with one hand and pulling his tail with the other. One of her feet is on a lion, and the other is on Mahishasura's chest. Mahishasura is depicted as a water buffalo. The idol's crown features Ganesha, a crescent moon and a lingam. The temple covers a large area, and has several shrines to Shiva and other deities. According to the Skanda Purana it cleanses pilgrims, and it is called the Virajā or the Birajā Kṣētra. Jajpur is believed to have about one crore of Shiva lingams.

== In Tantra ==

The Brahmayamala Tantra has a hymn, "Ādya Stōtra", dedicated to Shakti. In the hymn, Vimala is the goddess of Puri and Viraja (Girija) is the goddess worshipped in the Utkala kingdom, which became Odisha.

According to the Tantra Cūḍamaṇi, Sati's navel fell in the Utkala kingdom, also known as "Virajā Kṣētra". Adi Shankara, in his Aṣṭadaśa Śakti Pīṭha Stuti describes the goddess as Girija. In Tantra literature, the Ōḍḍiyāna Pīṭha (Devanagari: ओड्डियान पीठ) is located in eastern India near the Baitarani River (an Oddiyana is an ornament worn by a woman around her navel).

== Shri Bagalamukhi Devi ==
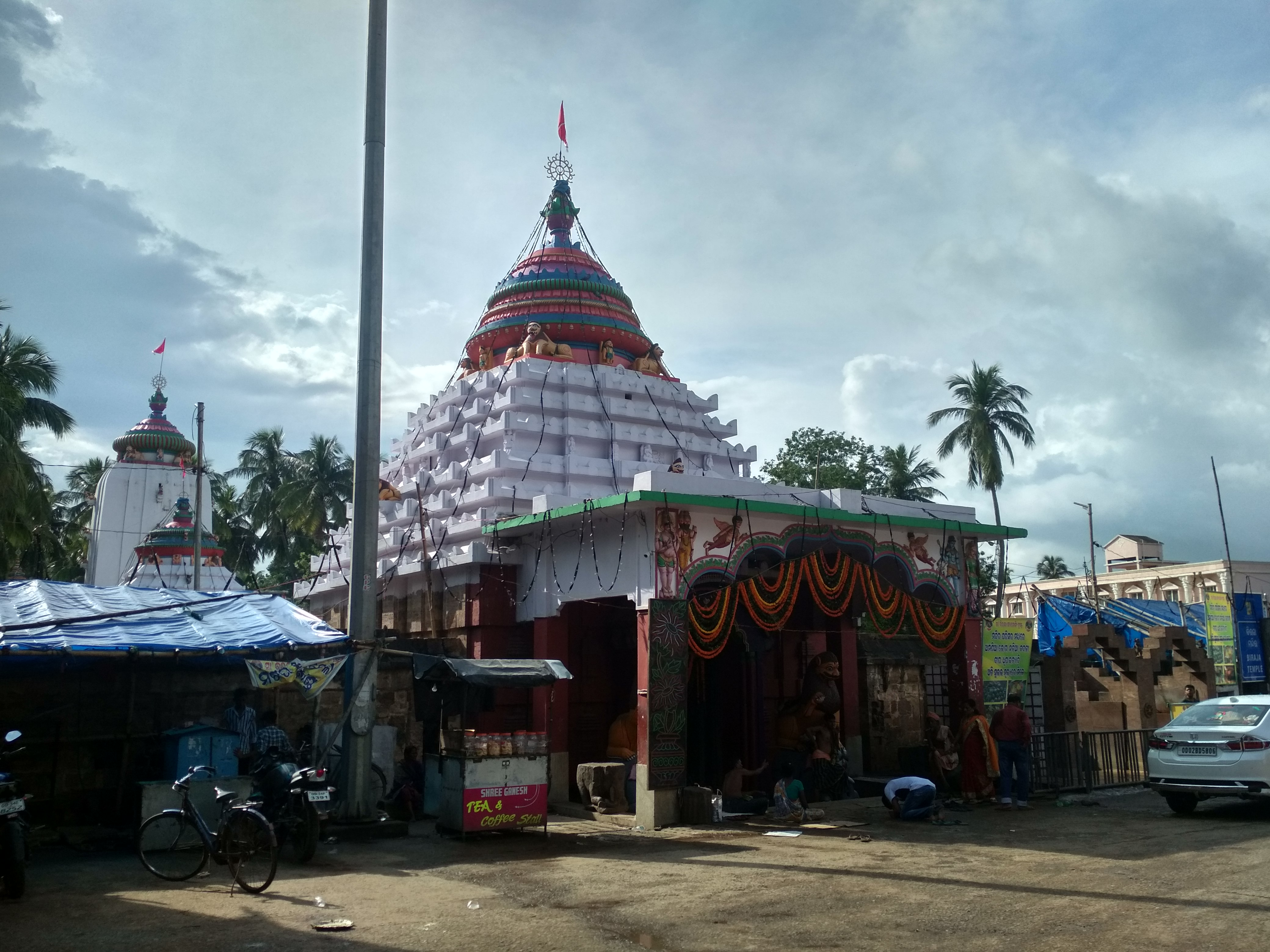
Front view from left side of Viraja (also named as Biraja) Temple

There is a separate shrine for Shri Bagalamukhi Devi, which is right of Maa Biraja. One can find very few temples for this rūpa of Daśamahāvidyā.

== Nabhi Gaya ==
Pitapuram holds the Pada Gaya, the Sira Gaya is found in Bihar, the Nabhi Gaya is found here in the form of a well. Pitri Puja (Pinda Dana, Tarpana, Tithi) are performed here. The temple itself arranges the priests and the pūjā items.

== Rituals and festivals ==
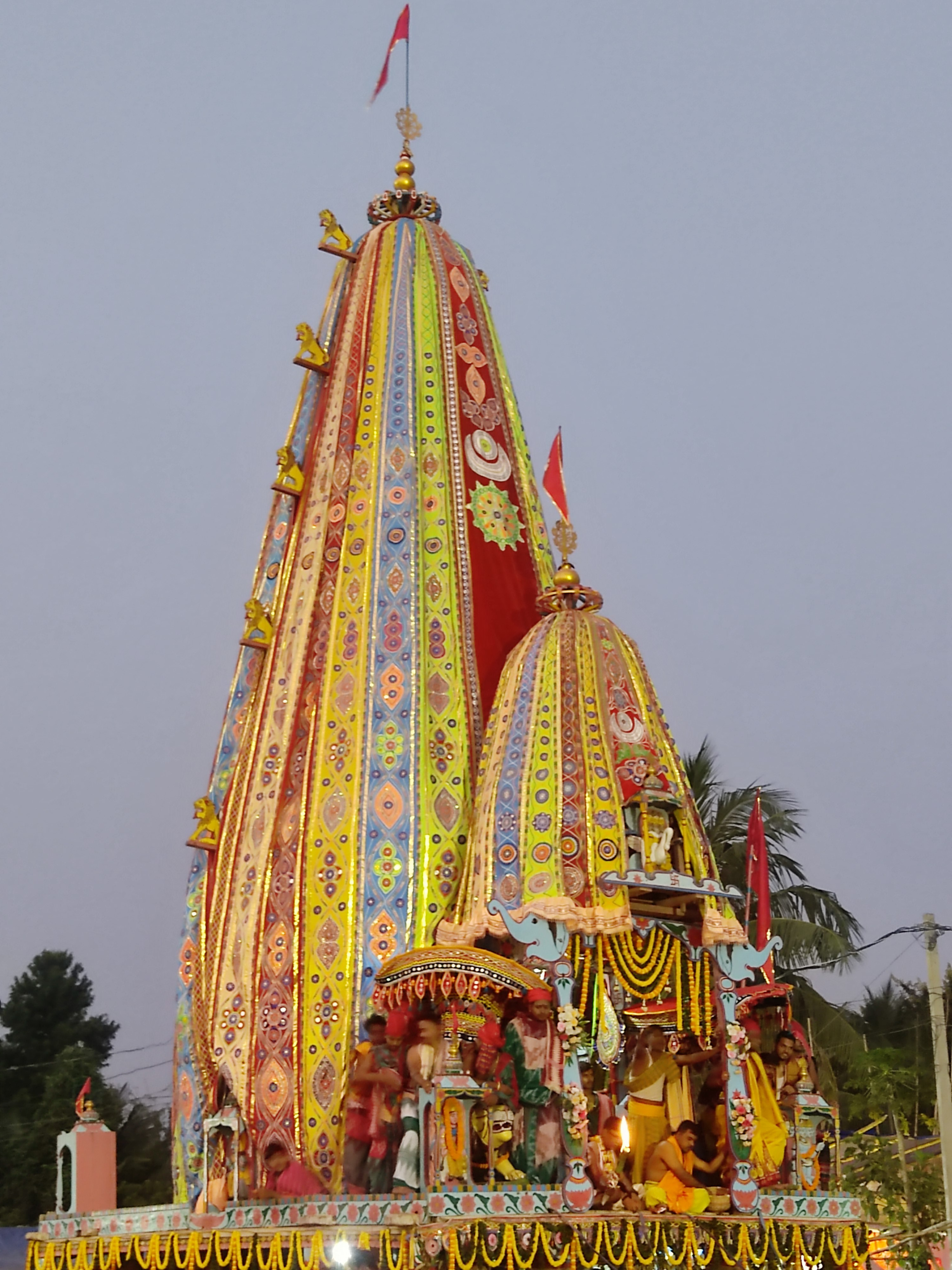
Ratha Yatra of Maa Biraja, Jajpur

The primary ritual in the temple is Sharadiya Durga Puja, which begins on the night of Krishna Paksha Ashtami. This falls before Mahalaya, and ends on Ashwin Shukla Paksha Navami. The puja, known as Shodasha Dinatatmika Puja, lasts for 16 days. The ratha (chariot festival) is known as Simhadhwaja, and its flag bears a lion. During the lunar transition from Shukla Ashtami to Shukla Navami an animal sacrifice, Bali Dāna, is performed. Navratri is celebrated as Aparajita Puja.

Other festivals include Nakshatra, Shravana, Prathamastami, Maha Bishuba (i.e., Pana) Sankranti, Raja Parva and Navanna. Devi is worshipped daily in accordance with Tantra and Agama traditions as Mahishasuramardini by the Brahmins of Jajpur.

== Transportation ==
The nearest railway station is Cuttack and Jajpur-Keonjhar Road. From there regular buses can be availed to Jajpur town. Mostly private buses run regularly in Odisha. Auto rickshaws connect Cuttack railway station to Cuttack Netaji Bus Terminal, which is hardly 3 km away. The bus from Cuttack to Jajpur town takes 2 to 2 1/2 hours. From Jajpur road to Jajpur town travelling time by road will be more than one hour. Also buses are available from Bhubaneswar. Buses which have express written on the buses are quicker than local buses.

== Accommodation ==
A couple of lodges are next to the temple and another is being constructed. Many hotels and lodges also within 2 km-radius.

== See also ==
- Varahanatha Temple
- Oddiyana
