= Pancha Tirtha of Puri =

Five sacred bathing spots of Puri, Odisha

Hindus consider it essential to bathe in the Pancha Tirtha or the five sacred bathing spots of Puri, India, to complete a pilgrimage to Puri. The five sacred water bodies are:

- Indradyumana Tank is located near the Gundicha Temple. The Mahabharat describes King Indradyumna's Ashvamedh Yagna and the advent of the four deities of the Jagannath cult. It describes how the holy Indradyumna tank was formed by the trodding of ground by thousands of cows donated by Indradyumna to Brahmins. To this day the Indradyumna tank is considered holy by pilgrims.

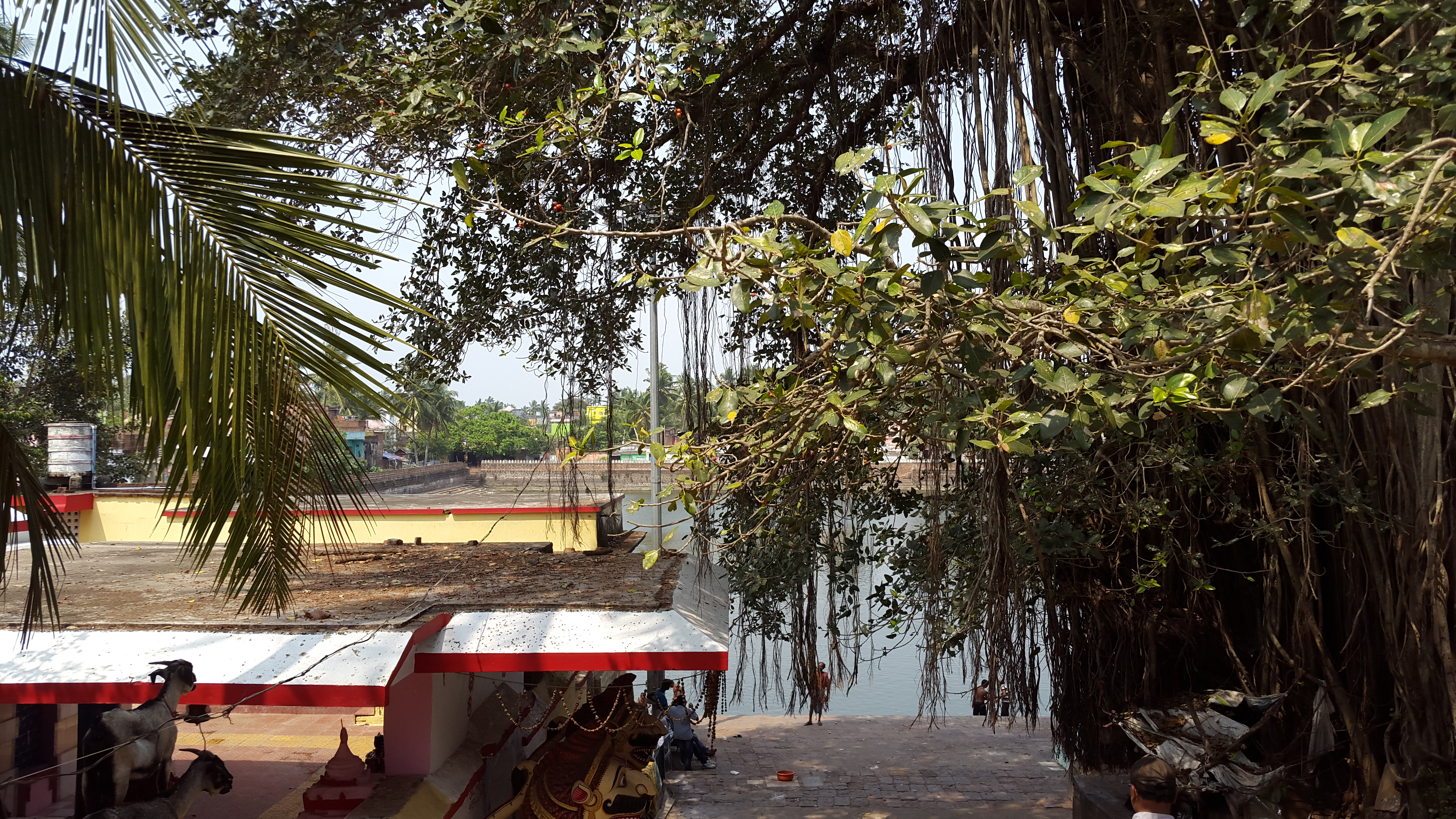
Indradyumna tank

- Rohini Kunda is a sacred well located inside the Jagannath Temple premises, near the Vimala Temple. The Rohini Kunda is considered the abode of Narayan. The holy banyan tree called the Akshaya Kalpavat located here is also worshipped. As per the Puranas, the hunter Jara Savara accidentally killed Krishna and cremated him. Krishna appeared in Jara's dreams and told him that his remains would transform into a log that would float from the sea to the Rohini Kunda. Indradyumna with Jara's help located the holy log from which the idol of Jagannath was carved.
- Markandeya Tank is considered the starting point of pilgrimage, for pilgrims to Puri. The water body is around 4 acres in size with the Markandeshwar Temple dedicated to Shiva situated beside it.
- Swetaganga Tank is located to the south of Nilachal. Temples dedicated to the Matsya Avatar of Vishnu and King Sweta are located on the banks of the tank.

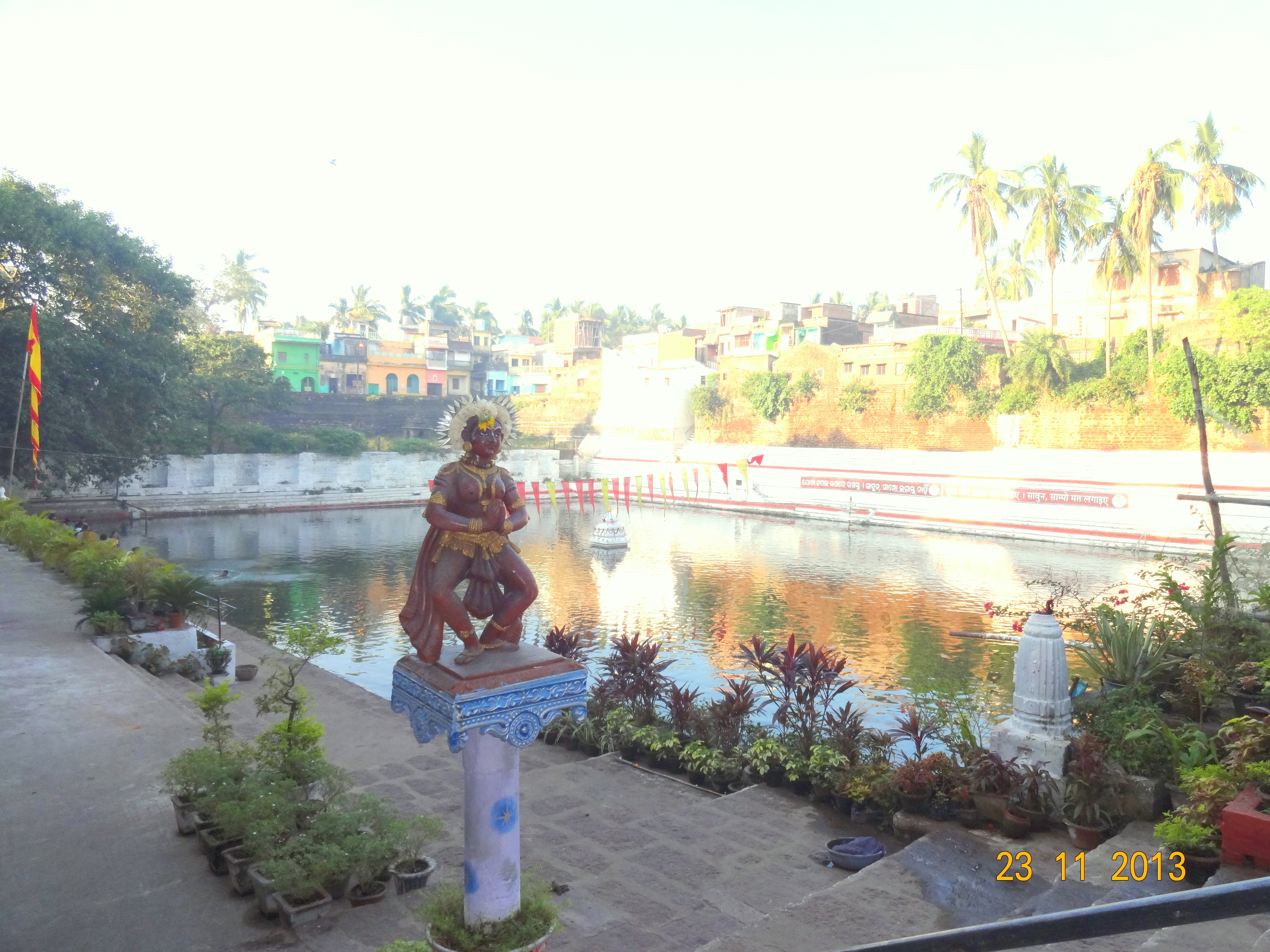
The Swetaganga Tank

- The Sea also called the Mahodadhi is considered a sacred bathing spot in the Swargadwara area. The Samudra arati is a daily tradition started by the present Shankaracharya 9 years ago. The daily practise includes prayer and fire offering to the sea at Swargadwar in Puri by disciples of the matha. On Paush Purnima of every year the Shankaracharya himself comes out to offer prayers to the sea.

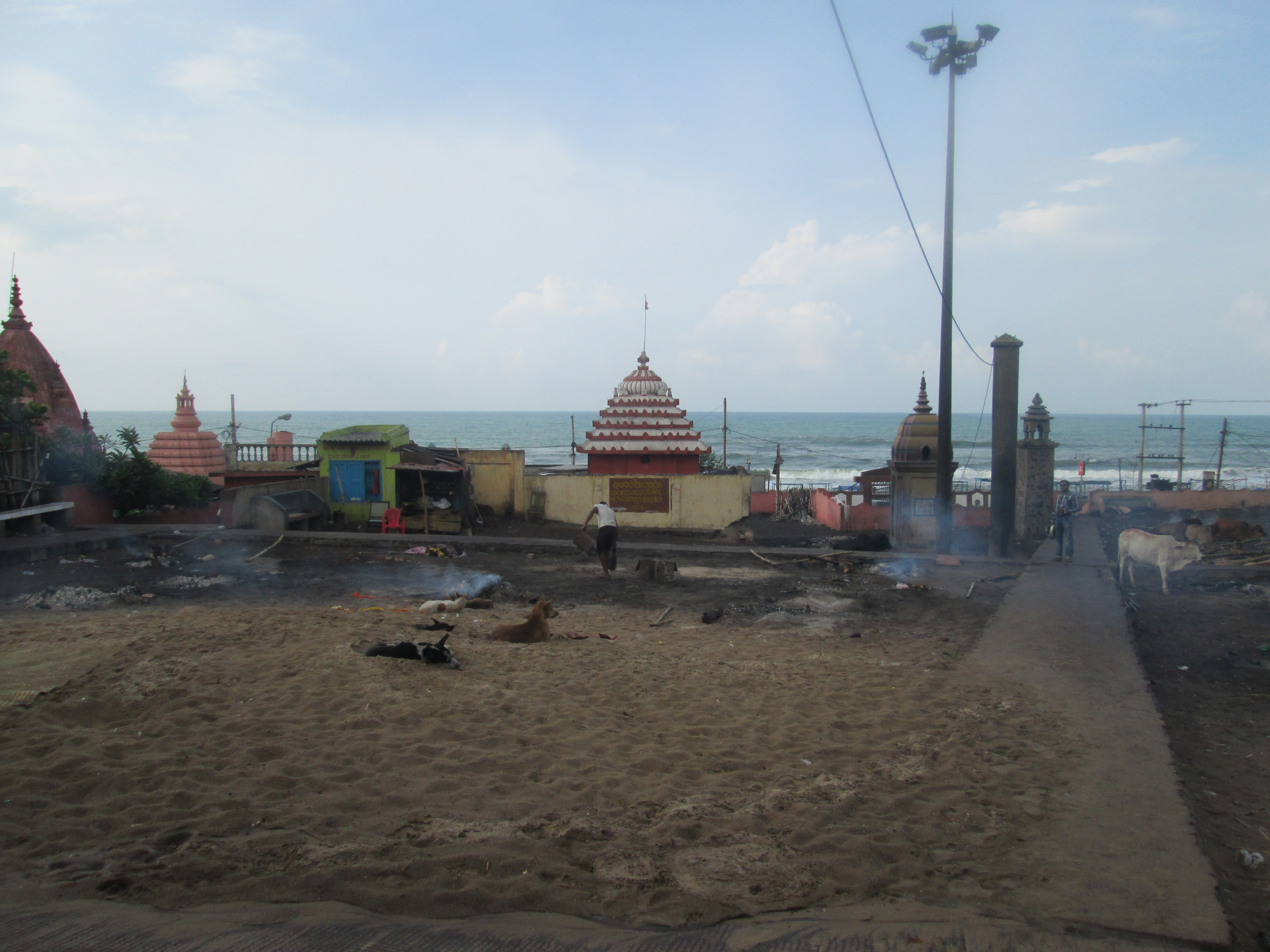
The Sea at Swargadwar of Puri

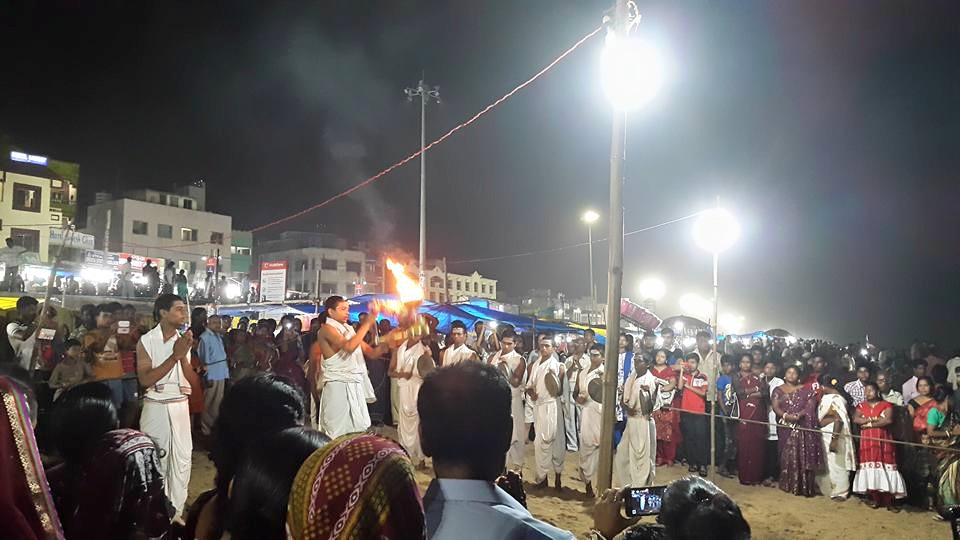
Samudra arati or worship of the sea at Swargadwar by disciples of the Govardhana matha

According to another version the 5 tirthas of Puri are the 5 important places all Pilgrims coming to Puri must visit:

1. Balarama
2. The Akshay Vata
3. Markandeya tank
4. Indradyumna tank
5. The Sea
