= Vimala Temple =

Hindu temple in Puri, India

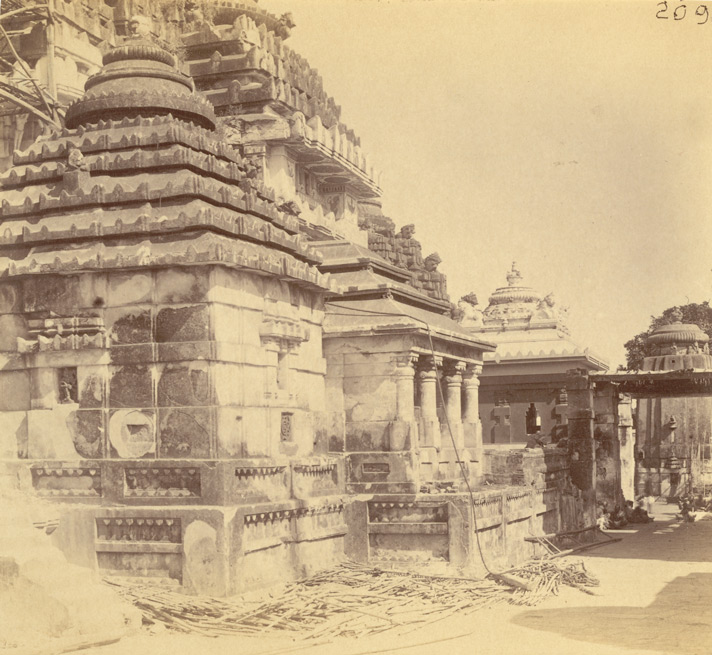
- Cluster of temples in the southern part of Jagannath temple complex, including the Vimala temple (extreme right). c. 1890.

- Location within Puri

Religion
- Affiliation: Hinduism
- District: Puri
- Deity: Vimala (Bimala) (tantric form of Lakshmi)
- Festival: Durga Puja
- Governing body: Shri Jagannath Temple Administration, Puri

Location
- Location: Jagannath Temple premises
- State: Odisha
- Country: India
- Coordinates: 19°48′17″N 85°49′6″E

Architecture
- Type: Kalinga architecture (Deula)
- Completed: 9th century

Website
- http://www.jagannath.nic.in/

The Vimala temple or Mãā Bimåḷā Deuḷå (Odia - ମାଁ ବିମଳା ଦେଉଳ) is a Hindu temple to Vimala or Bimala (ବିମଳା), in the Jagannath Temple complex in Puri in the Indian state of Odisha. It is generally regarded as a Shakta pitha, among the holiest temples dedicated to the Devi.

The temple is located in the south-west corner of the inner enclosure of the Jagannath temple complex and on the western corner of the tower of Jagannath, next to the sacred pond Rohini kunda. The temple faces east and is built of sandstone and laterite. It is built in the Deula style with four components; vimana (structure containing the sanctum), jagamohana (assembly hall), nata-mandapa (festival hall) and bhoga-mandapa (hall of offerings). The temple was renovated around 2005 and is maintained by the Archaeological Survey of India, Bhubaneswar Circle.

Though a small shrine in the temple complex, the Vimala temple is important to the Shakta and Tantric worshippers, who revere it even more than the main Jagannath shrine. Vimala is considered to be the tantric consort of Jagannath, hence considered as a tantric form of Lakshmi and a guardian of the temple complex. Devotees pay respect to Vimala before worshipping Jagannath in the main temple. Food offered to Jagannath does not get sanctified as Mahaprasad until it is also offered to Vimala. The festival of Durga Puja in the Hindu month of Ashvin (October) is celebrated for sixteen days at Vimala, culminating with Vijayadashami.

== History ==
The central icon of Vimala is of sixth century CE. The present structure, based on its architecture, seems to have been built in the ninth century under the Eastern Ganga dynasty, possibly over ruins of an earlier temple. Its architecture is similar to the shrine of Narasimha near the Mukti-mandapa (a temple hall) in the Jagannath temple complex, dated to the ninth century. The Madala Panji states that the temple was constructed by Yayati Keshari, a ruler of Somavashi Dynasty of South Kosala. Kings Yayati I (c. 922–955) and Yayati II (c. 1025–1040) are known by the title Yayati Keshari. The sculptures, especially the parshvadevatas (attendant deities), as well as the background slab of the central icon, reflect the Somavashi style and may be part of the original temple, on whose ruins the new temple was constructed. Vimala is believed to have preceded even the central Jagannath shrine.

Hindu philosopher and saint Adi Shankara (c. 8th century) is believed to have established Govardhana matha in Puri, with Vimala as its presiding goddess. According to Starza (author of The Jagannatha Temple at Puri), the Jagannath Temple was once a centre of worship for the Trimurti of Brahma, Vishnu and Shiva, along with their consorts and the three central forms of the Hindu Goddess, Sarasvati, Lakshmi and Parvati. The Shri Vidya sect devoted to Goddess worship was strong here until the 17th century. Slowly, Shri Vidya and Shiva-centric Shaiva traditions were eroded but remnants continue, with the Vishnu-centric Vaishnavism becoming the sole tradition. The Tantric Panchamakara, which includes fish, meat, liquor, parched grain and ritual intercourse, were replaced with vegetarian offerings and dance of Devdasis. Fish was caught locally and offered to the goddess. King Narasimhadeva, who ruled between 1623 and 1647, ended the meat and fish offerings of the goddess, although the tradition was later partly revitalized. Today, the goddess is offered meat and fish on special days.

== Architecture ==
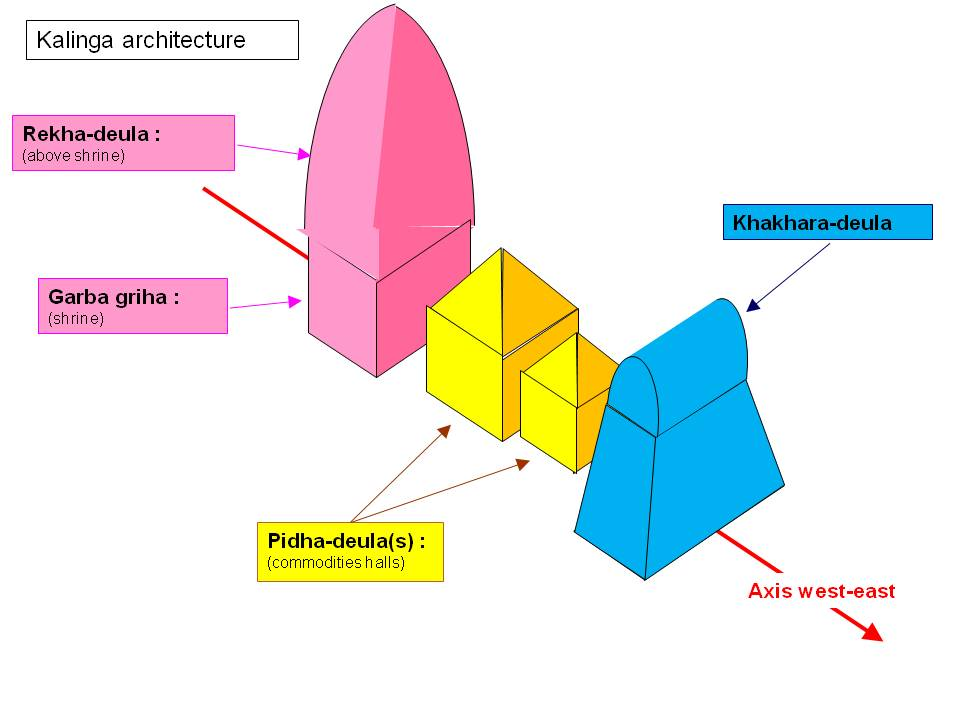
A typical Deula temple plan. The plan is similar to Vimala Temple, except the outermost hall which is a pidha-deula in the Vimala Temple, a Khakhara deula in the diagram.

The temple is located in the south-west corner of the inner enclosure of the Jagannath temple complex and on the right hand western corner of the tower of Jagannath, next to the sacred pond Rohini kunda. The temple faces east and is built of sandstone and laterite. It is built in the Deula style that has four components namely, vimana (structure containing the sanctum), jagamohana (assembly hall), nata-mandapa (festival hall) and bhoga-mandapa (hall of offerings). The temple is maintained and was renovated around 2005 by the Archaeological Survey of India, Bhubaneswar Circle.

=== Vimana ===
The vimana is a Rekha deula (a tall building with a shape of sugarloaf), 60 feet (18 m) in height and in shape of 15 feet (4.6 m) square. It stands on a 2 feet (0.61 m) platform, which is decorated with lotus and other floral designs and scrollwork. The outer wall of the vimana is divided into 5 parts (from base to top): pabhaga, talajangha, bandhana, upara jangha and baranda. The niches and intervening recesses of the first part of the wall are ornate, with khakhara mundis (a type of niche), scrollwork, floral designs, creepers, love-making couples and Nagas (serpent-men). The niches and intervening recesses of the second part of the wall are also decorated with khakhara mundis, simhavidalas (a lion-faced beast), Gajavidalas (an elephant-faced lion trampling a lion), jaliwork, scrollwork, sikshadana scene (sages teaching disciples) and kirtimukha (a monster face) motifs, along with the figurines of eight Dikpalas (guardian gods of the directions) and some goddesses. The third part of the outer wall has two horizontal mouldings decorated with alasa-kanyas (beautiful human maidens), scrollwork and floral and lotus motifs. The niches and recesses of the fourth part of the wall are decorated with pidha mundis (a type of niche), simhavidalas, erotic scenes, alasa-kanyas, scrollwork, jaliwork and floral designs, along with figures of the consorts of the Dikpalas, Nagas and their female consort Naginis and various goddesses. The Dikpalas and their consorts are seen with their mounts and aligned to their respective directions.

Images of the parshvadevatas (attendant deities) are placed in the central niches of the outer wall (bada) on three sides: the eight-armed Durga slaying Mahishasura on the south; the six-armed goddess Chamunda standing on Shiva on the west and an empty niche on the north, which probably had a goddess figure that was stolen. The lintel of the attendant deity niche has Gaja Lakshmi figurines. The frames of the niches are decorated with scrollwork and kirtimukha motifs and two female attendants accompany each niche. The uppermost part of the outer wall has ten horizontal mouldings, ornate with scrollwork, kirtimukha and lotus and floral motifs. Within the vimana lies the garbhagriha (sanctum), which is topped with a pancharatha-style, curvilinear temple pinnacle. The goddess Vimala is deified within the sanctum, the sixth century inner chamber that is devoid of wall decorations. The central icon of Vimala holds a rosary in the upper right hand. Her lower right hand is held in a boon-giving gesture and her lower left holds a pitcher, considered to be filled with amrita(celestial elixir of life). The attribute in the upper left hand is heavily disputed. Descriptions include a human figurine, a nagini, a mermaid, a naga-pasha (serpent-noose) or some other object. She holds no weapons normally attributed to Durga. The icon is installed on a simhasana (lion-throne), adorned with the figures of the goddess' female attendants Chhaya and Maya on the sides. The image is said to be made of lakha (a type of wax) and slightly taller than 4 feet (1.2 m).

The sanctum door, with a flight of stairs, leads down to the jagamohana. The lintel has the Gaja Lakshmi figurine in the centre surrounded with apsaras (celestial maidens). The Navagraha (deities of the classical planets) are carved above the lintel. The doorjambs are decorated scrollwork, creepers, flowers and boys playing. Two gate-keeper sculptors surround the door.

=== Jagamohana ===
The jagamohana or mukhasala is a pidha deula (square building with a pyramid-shaped roof), 35 feet (11 m) in height with a 25 feet (7.6 m) square base. It stands on a 2 feet (0.61 m) high platform, which is decorated with floral designs and scrollwork. The outer wall is divided into 5 parts, as in the vimana. The niches and intervening recesses of the first part are adorned with Khakhara mundi niches (having amorous couples and erotic scenes), Naga pilasters, scrollwork, jaliwork and floral motifs. The talajangha has the same motifs as the vimana's second part of the wall, barring the goddesses. The third part of the wall has three horizontal mouldings. The fourth part of the wall also resembles its counterpart in the vimana, except it does not have the Naga and goddess sculptures. The uppermost part of the wall has seven horizontal mouldings, the central portion of which is decorated with dancing women, amorous couples, elephants, deer, scrollwork and jaliwork. The gavaksha (decorative arch) on the northern and southern sides are royal court and sikshadana scenes, with a balustraded window on each side. The frames of the windows are decorated with scrollwork, jaliwork, playing boys, floral designs, creepers and dancing women. The structure is topped with a pyramidal shikhara. The inner walls have no ornamentation. The jagamohana has two doorways: one towards the sanctum (already discussed in vimana section) and other towards the natamandapa, which is similar in style and decoration to the former.

=== Natamandapa ===
The natamandapa is a pidha deula, 22 feet (6.7 m) in height and in shape of rectangle 35 feet (11 m) in length by 18 feet (5.5 m). It is probably a later addition to the original temple, which consisted of the vimana and jagamohana. It stands on a 3.5 feet (1.1 m) platform. The five divisions of the outer wall are undecorated. It is topped with a small pyramidal pinnacle. The natamandapa has four door ways, one on each side of the wall. Inner walls of the natamandapa are adorned with Pattachitra-style traditional Odishan paintings, depicting sixteen forms of the Hindu Goddess, including the Mahavidyas.

=== Bhogamandapa ===
The bhogamandapa is a pidha deula, 20 feet (6.1 m) in height and in shape of 15 feet (4.6 m) square. It stands on a 4 feet (1.2 m) platform. The five outer wall divisions are undecorated. It is topped with a small pinnacle. An eight-armed dancing Ganesha and a 12-armed, six-headed standing Kartikeya (both are the sons of Parvati and Shiva) occupy niches on the western inner wall. The ceiling has floral paintings with a lotus design in the middle, suspending downwards. The bhogamandapa has four doorways, opening on each side. Two female gatekeepers guard each door. A flight of steps at the eastern doorway serves as the main entrance of the temple.

At the entrance to the shrine outside the bhogamandapa, there is a 4 feet (1.2 m) Gaja-Simha, the lion – the goddess' vahana (mount or vehicle) – riding over an elephant, symbolizing the victory of good over evil. It is covered by a flat roof.

== Religious significance ==
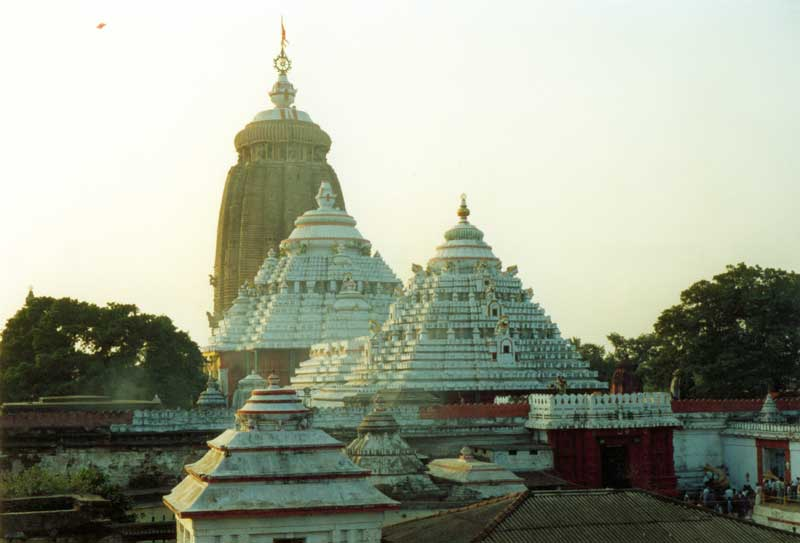
Jagannath temple complex

The Vimala Temple is considered one of the Shakta pithas, the most sacred temples of the Hindu Goddess, identified with Parvati or Durga. It is considered to be a prime example of the importance of the Shakti tradition in Odisha. It is customary to worship the god Shiva (Parvati's consort) at each Shakta pitha in the form of Bhairava, the male counterpart or guardian of the presiding goddess of the Shakta pitha.

In Goddess-oriented worship, Vimala (Bimala) is regarded as the presiding goddess of the Purushottama (Puri) Shakta pitha. Jagannath, a form of the god Vishnu/Krishna (Krishna is generally regarded as an avatar of Vishnu), is worshipped as the Pitha's Bhairava. This is a departure from the usual tradition of Bhairava as a form of Shiva. So, in this temple complex, Vishnu–one of the Hindu trinity–is equated with Shiva, another of the trinity; this is interpreted to convey the oneness of God. In this regard, Vimala - generally associated with Shiva's consort - is also considered as Lakshmi, the consort of Vishnu. Conversely, Tantrics consider Jagannath as Shiva-Bhairava, rather than a form of Vishnu.

The main sanctum of the Jagannath Temple has three deities: Jagannath, Balabhadra (elder brother of Krishna, sometimes identified with Shiva) and Subhadra (the younger sister of Krishna and Balabhadra). In Jagannath-centric traditions, while Lakshmi is the consort of Jagannath in the temple complex, Vimala is the Tantric consort and guardian goddess of the temple complex.

Vimala is identified with the goddesses Katyayini, Durga, Bhairavi, Bhuvaneshvari and Ekanamsha in various texts and rituals. She is considered the shakti of Vishnu as well as Shiva in the climactic Durga Puja festivities in the temple. She appears as Mahishasuramardini (Durga as slayer of the demon Mahishasura) or Vijayalakshmi (the warrior form of Lakshmi) in New Delhi Konark stele, 13th century stone stele originally from Konark Sun Temple and now housed in National Museum, New Delhi.

=== In Shakta pitha lists ===
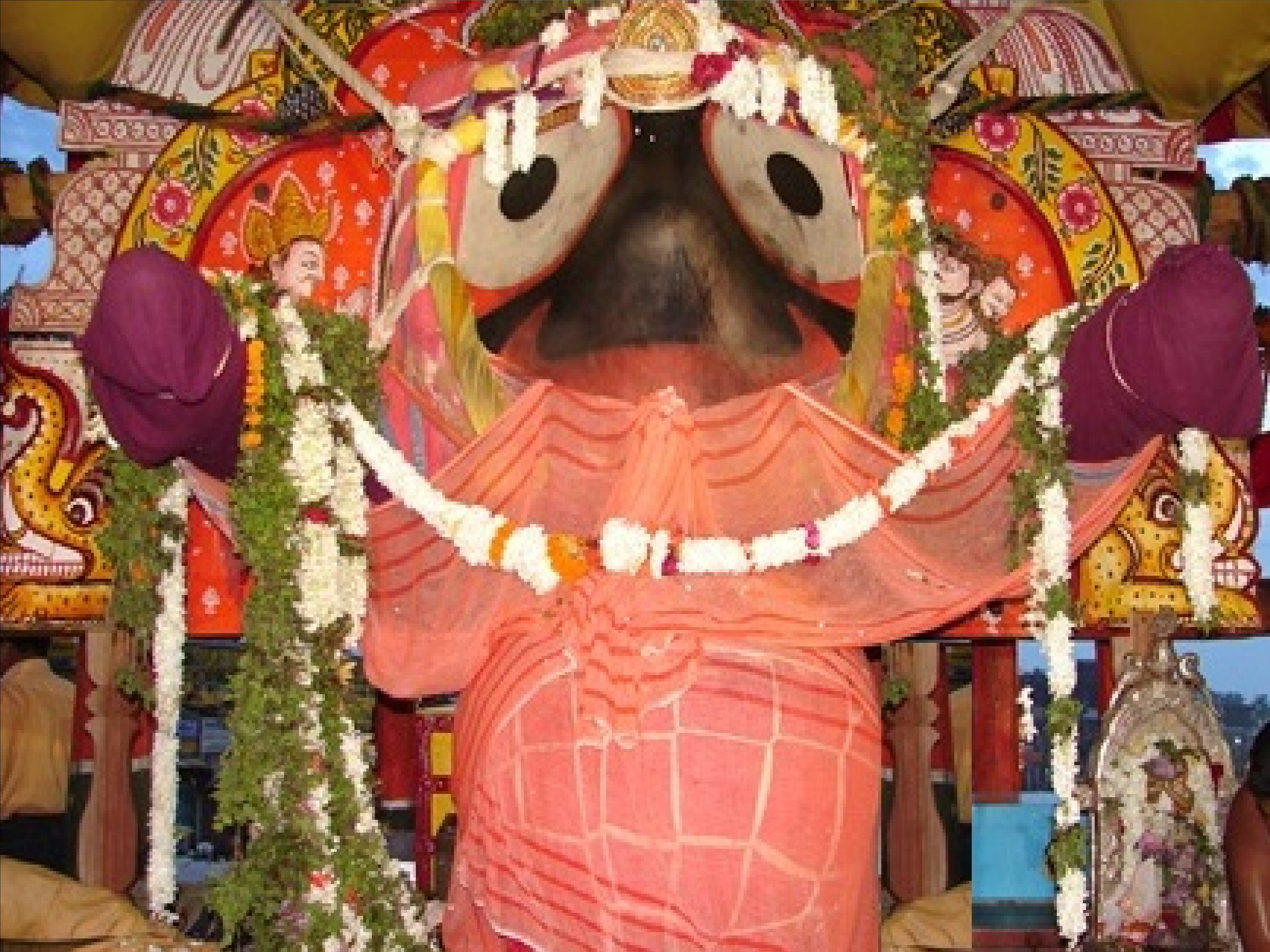
Jagannath (pictured), the presiding God of the temple complex, is described as the Bhairava or consort of the goddess Vimala.

According to Hindu Puranas, Sati, the daughter of Prajapati Daksha, married Shiva against the wish of Daksha. Daksha organised a great yajna (sacrifice), but did not invite Sati and Shiva. Uninvited, Sati reached the yajna-site, where Daksha ignored Sati and vilified Shiva. Unable to withstand this insult, Sati sacrificed herself in the fire. The wild, grief-stricken Shiva wandered the universe with her half-burnt corpse. Finally, Vishnu dismembered her body into 51 parts, each of which fell on different places on the earth, each creating a Shakta pitha.

The list of Shakta pithas differ in various religious texts. Many mention Vimala or Jagannath temple complex as a Shakta pitha, and calls the location by various names. In the Kalika Purana, four Pithas (centres of Tantrism) are mentioned, corresponding to the four cardinal directions. The Oddiyana or Uddiyana (now clearly identified as Odisha) in the west hosts the temple of Katyayini (identified with Vimala) and her consort Jagannath. The Hevajara Tantra, which has a similar list, also mentions Katyayini as the Bhairavi and Jagannath as the Bhairava in the Pitha of Udra (Odra, identified with Odisha).

The Pithanirnaya or Mahapithanirupana section from the Tantrachudamani mentions Viraja-kshetra in Utkala (present-day Odisha) as a Shakta pitha, with Vimala as the presiding goddess (Devi), Jagannath as Bhairava and her navel as the body part that fell here. One version of this text, however, demotes the site from a Pitha to an upa-Pitha (subordinate Pitha). Here, the Uchchhishta (that is, left-over or partially eaten food) of Sati is said to be the "fallen part" ( anga-pratyanga) and the temple location is called Nilachal or "Blue mountain", which is the traditional name of the site of the Jagannath temple complex. Nilachala or Nila Parvata is mentioned as an upa-pitha also in the Shiva-charita with Vimala and Jagannath as the Devi and Bhairava respectively.

The Tantric work Kubjika Tantra names Vimala among 42 Siddha Pithas, where Siddhis - a set of supernatural powers - can be gained. The Devi Bhagavata Purana, Prana Toshini Tantra and Brihan Nila Tantra name the Vimala temple as a Pitha in their list of 108 temples. The Matsya Purana mentions Purushottama Kshetra with goddess Vimala as a Shakta pitha. The Vamana Purana notes it as a sacred pilgrimage site. The Mahapitha Nirupanam also mentions Vimala and Jagannath as deities of the Pitha. In the Namasttotra Sata, a Puranic list of 100 mother goddesses, Vimala of Purushottama is named. The Devi Purana also mentions it as a Pitha where the feet of Sati fell.

== Worship ==
The people of Odisha take pride in the Vimala temple. They consider it the most important temple to the Goddess and a must-visit. Devotees visit the temple religiously every day and recite hymns from the Devi Mahatmya, attributed to the sage Markandeya, Debyaparadhakshyamapana stotram by Adi Shankara and Vimalastakam composed by Purusottam Rakshit. It is prescribed that devotees pay their respects to the goddess Vimala before worshipping Jagannath in the main temple. The waters of Rohini kunda, the tirtha (sacred pool) of Vimala, are also considered holy. Tantrics often visit the temple, which they consider more important than the central Jagannath shrine.

The Goddess-oriented festival of Durga Puja in the Hindu month of Ashvin (October) is celebrated for sixteen days, culminating with Vijayadashami. On Vijayadashami, Vimala is worshipped by the titular Gajapati king of Puri as the goddess Durga, who is believed to have slain the demon Mahishasura on this day. The earliest record of this is the New Delhi Konark stele, which narrate that King Narasimhadeva I (reign: 1238–1264) worshipped Durga-Madhava (Vimala-Jagannath) on the tenth day of Durga Puja, that is, Vijayadashami. As the goddess is believed to assume a destructive aspect during the Durga Puja, women are debarred in the temple as they are considered too "weak-hearted" to witness this terrible form of the goddess.

=== Food offerings ===
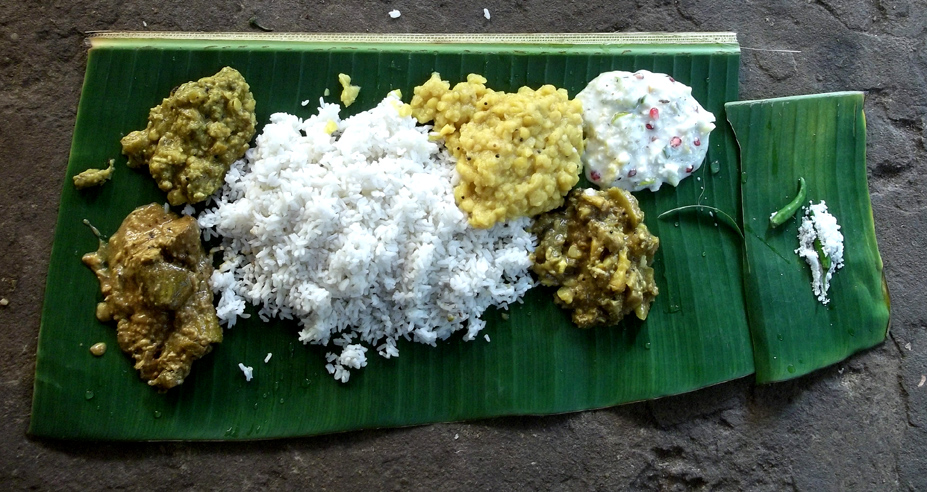
Food offerings to Jagannath become Mahaprasad (pictured) after being offered to Goddess Vimala.

Generally, no separate food offerings are cooked for the goddess Vimala. The goddess is described to survive on the remnants (Uchchhishta) of Jagannath's meals. The vegetarian food offerings to Jagannath are offered to Vimala, after which they are sanctified as Mahaprasad (see also prasad). The Mahaprasad consists of dried rice mixed with grated coconut, cheese, curd and butter. The Shankaracharya, head of the Govardhana matha, receives a pot of the mahaprasad and a plate of khichdi that is offered to the goddess, the presiding goddess (Adya-shakti) of the matha as well as of the temple.

The legend narrates the tale behind the tradition of offering the Uchchhishta, which otherwise is a taboo in Hinduism. Once, Shiva on a visit to Vishnu's abode Vaikuntha, saw that a few food grains (Uchchhishta) had fallen on the ground after Vishnu finished his meal. Shiva quickly picked up a grain and swallowed it. Unbeknownst to him, half of it stuck to his beard. When he returned to his abode, the sage Narada saw the half grain on Shiva's beard, and ate it. Parvati, Shiva's consort, was upset that her rightful share of Vishnu's prasad had been eaten by Narada. In a peeved mood, she went to Vishnu and complained. Vishnu pacified her saying that in the Kali Yuga (the present era as per Hindu beliefs), she would live at Puri as Vimala, and would daily eat the remnants of his food.

The only time in the year when separate food is cooked for the goddess is when she is offered non-vegetarian offerings. During Durga Puja, Vimala is offered non-vegetarian food and animal sacrifice, traditionally offered to the Hindu Mother Goddess. The goddess is considered to assume a destructive form during the festival and the meat is considered necessary to placate her. In strict secrecy during the pre-dawn hours, animal sacrifice of a he-goat is offered in the temple, while fish from the sacred Markanda temple tank are cooked and offered to Vimala, as per Tantric rituals. The rituals have to be completed before the doors of the main sanctum of the vegetarian Jagannath are opened at dawn and the first morning aarti is offered to the god. Vaishnava devotees of Jagannath are debarred from the temple. Only a few who witness the ceremony are given the Bimala parusa (Vimala's cuisine) as prasad. The animal sacrifice and the non-vegetarian offerings to Vimala produced protests.

== Bibliography ==
- Lal, Mohan (1992). Encyclopaedia of Indian Literature: Sasay to Zorgot. Sahitya Akademi. ISBN 978-81-260-1221-3.
- O'malley, L.S.S. (1 January 2007). Bengal District Gazetteer : Puri. Concept Publishing Company. ISBN 978-81-7268-138-8.
- Sircar, Dines Chandra (1998). The Śākta Pīṭhas. Motilal Banarsidass Publ. ISBN 978-81-208-0879-9.
- Singh Deo, Jitamitra Prasad (2001). Tāntric Art of Odisha. Kalpaz Publications. ISBN 978-81-7835-041-7.
- Starza, O. M. (1993). The Jagannatha Temple at Puri: Its Architecture, Art, and Cult. BRILL. ISBN 978-90-04-09673-8.
