= Gajavidala =

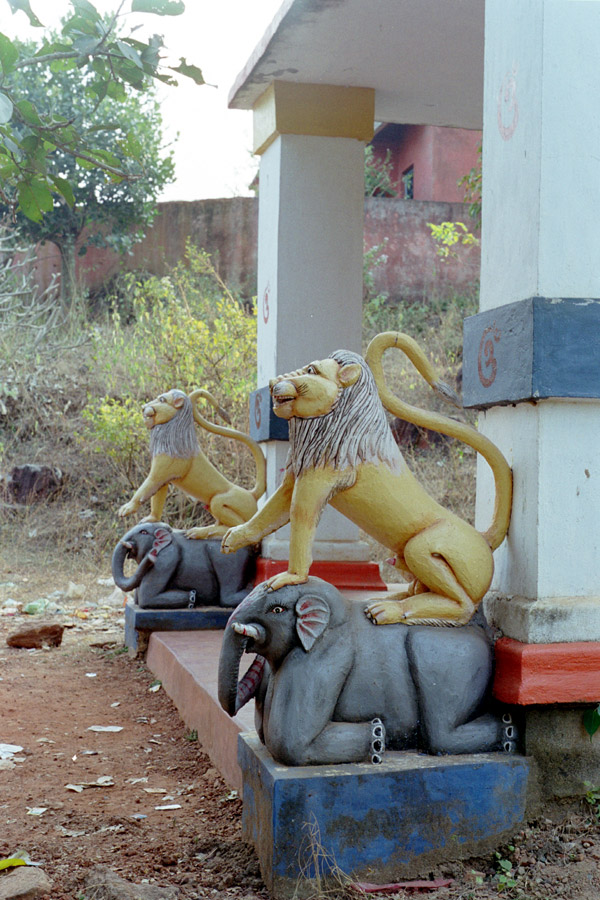
A popular representation

Gajavidala is a motif in the architecture of India that depicts a lion overpowering an elephant.

It is a popular theme in Bengal and Odisha.

The Yali is a creature in an Indian legend, with the body of a lion and the trunk and tusks of an elephant.

== See also ==
- Hindu iconography
- Garuda
