= Markandeshwar Temple =

Coordinates: 19.810354°N 85.815143°E

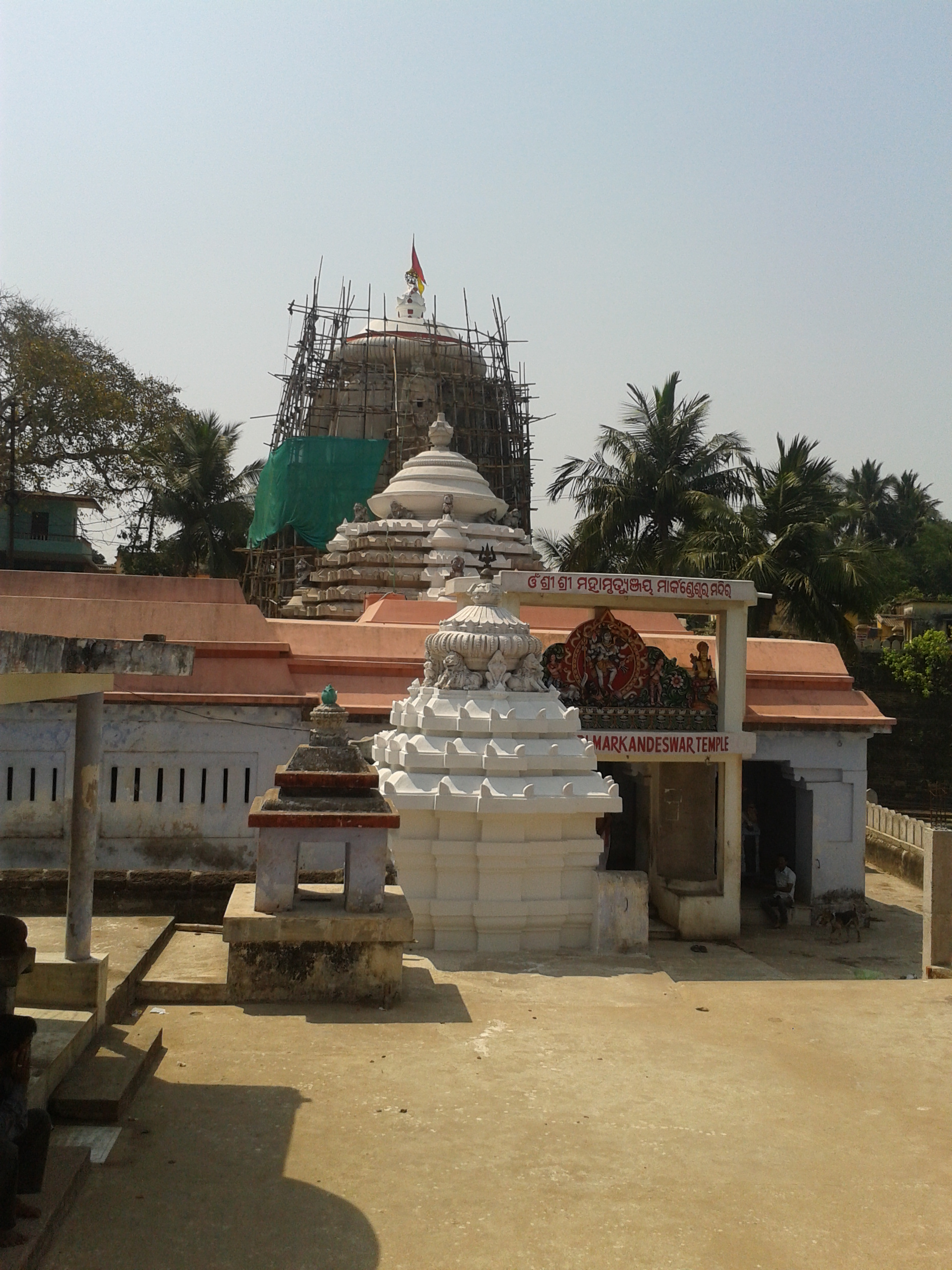

Religion
- Affiliation: Hinduism
- District: Puri
- Deity: Shiva

Location
- Location: Markandeswar tank, to the north of the Jagannath temple
- State: Odisha
- Country: India
- Interactive map of Markandeshwar Temple

Markandeshwar Temple is on Markandeswar street, Puri, Odisha, India.
