= Baitarani River =

River in Odisha, India

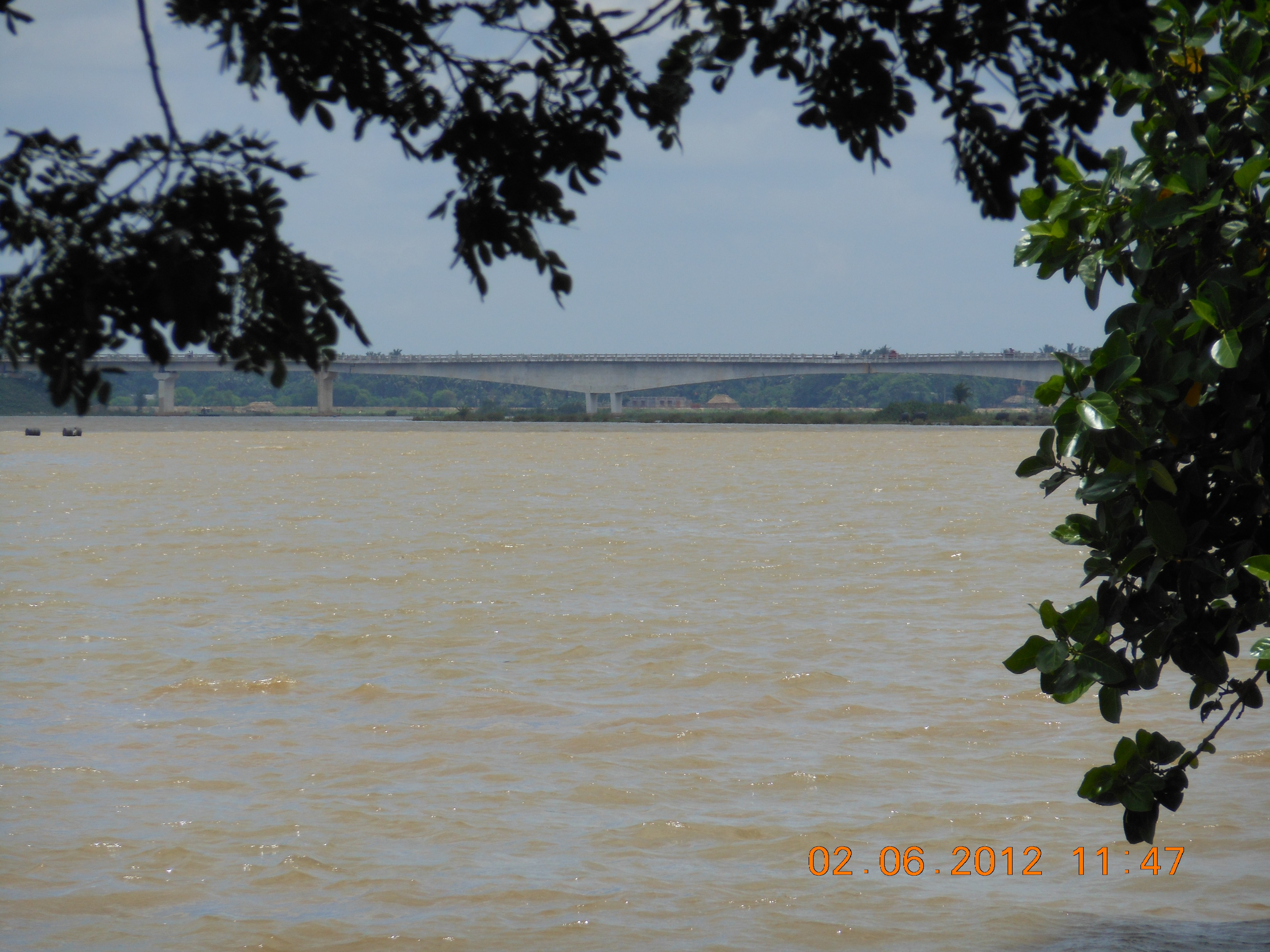
- Native name: ବୈତରଣୀ ନଦୀ (Odia)

Location
- Country: India
- State: Odisha

Physical characteristics
- Source: Gonasika Hills Guptaganga Hills
  - location: Keonjhar, Odisha
  - coordinates: 21°30′17″N 85°33′07″E
- Mouth: Bay of Bengal
  - location: Odisha
  - coordinates: 20°46′37″N 86°57′17″E
- Length: 360 km (220 mi)
- Discharge
  - location: Bay of Bengal
  - average: 903 m^{3}/s (31,900 cu ft/s)

The Baitarani (also spelled Vaitarani, Odia: ବୈତରଣୀ) is one of six major rivers of Odisha, India. Venerated in popular epics and legends, the Baitarani River is a source of water for agricultural irrigation. The coastal plain of Odisha has the name of Hexadeltaic region (i.e., the 'Gift of Six Rivers'). These deltas divide the coastal plain into three regions from north to south. The Baitarani, the Mahanadi and the Brahmani rivers form the Middle Coastal Plain, with evidence of past "back bays" and present lakes.

== Sources ==
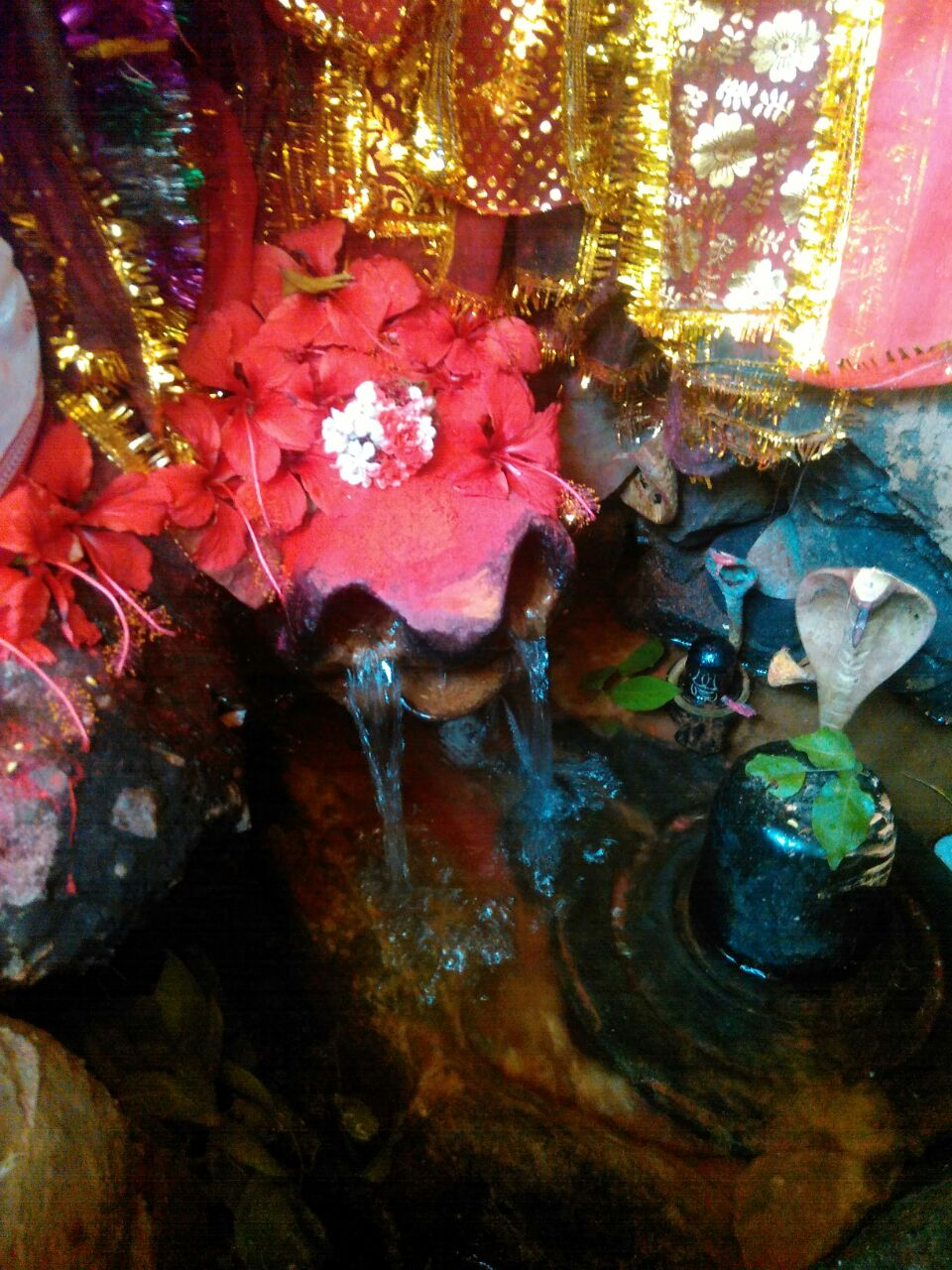
Gonasika, origin point of Baitarani

The Baitarani originates from the Gonasika/Guptaganga (Cow Nose Shaped) hills, and starts flowing over a stone looking like the nostril of a cow. Afterwards, for about half a kilometre, the river flows underground and is not visible from outside. The Baitarani is known here by the name Guptaganga or the Gupta Baitarani, in Gonasika of Keonjhar district in Odisha state of India at an elevation of 900 metres (3,000 ft) above sea level. The uppermost part of the river, about 80 kilometres (50 mi) in length, flows in a northerly direction; then it changes its path suddenly by 90 degrees and flows eastward. The beginning portion of Baitarani briefly marks the boundary between the states of Odisha and Jharkhand.

== Course ==
The river enters a plain at Anandapur and creates a deltaic zone at Akhuapada. The river is 360 kilometres (220 mi) in length and drain into the Bay of Bengal after joining of the Brahmani at Dhamra mouth near Chandabali. The river has 65 tributaries, of which 35 join from the left side and 30 from the right. The river basin in Odisha is spread among 42 blocks of eight districts. Budhi, Kanjori, Ambajhara, Mushal, Kusei, Salandi are some of the tributaries of Baitarani.

== Location ==
A major portion of the river basin lies within the state of Odisha, while a small patch of the upper reach lies in Jharkhand state. The upper Baitarani basin on the western slopes of the Eastern Ghats, comprising the Panposh-Keonjhar-Pallahara plateau, is one of the two plateaus forming "The Central Plateaus"—one of Odisha's five major morphological regions.

== Dams and barrages ==
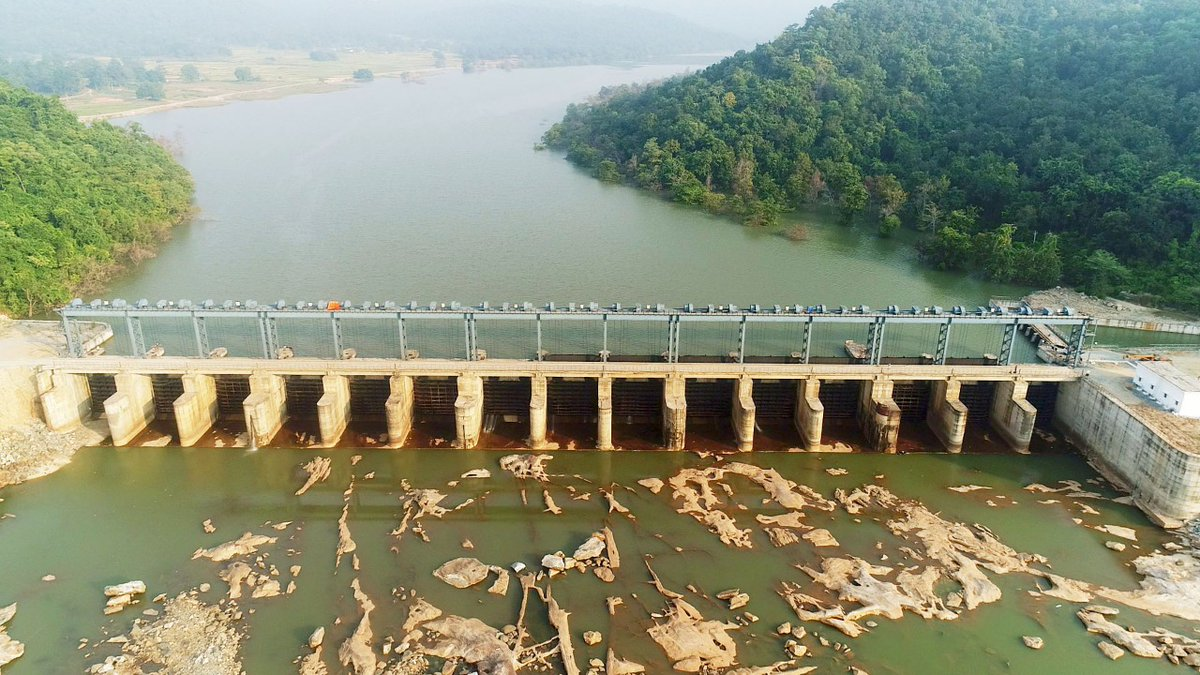
Dam on the Baitarani river at Singhanali

Dams and barrages on the Baitarani and its major tributary, the Salandi, irrigate 61,920 hectares (153,000 acres). The proposed Bhimkund and upper Baitarani multi-purpose projects envisage many more dams across this river and its tributaries to provide irrigation to more than 1,000 square kilometres (390 mi^{2}). A new barrage was established near Anandapur and it was inaugurated by the CM of Odisha, Naveen Patnaik.

== Flooding ==
Flooding is a regular phenomenon in the Baitarani basin. The inhabitants near the river live in fear of loss to life and property. Even a two-day rain in July 2005 caused the river to overflow its banks, affecting 140,000 people in 220 villages of Jajpur and Bhadrak districts. In at least two places the embankments were breached and flooding occurred, inflicting loss of life and property. Apart from the long pending construction of a dam at Bhimkund and other proposed measures like riverbed excavation and construction of embankments etc. in the deltaic region, there remain the unaddressed land use issues in the upstream, to which, till date, no serious thoughts or efforts have been directed.

== Industry and water quality ==
Due to drainage into the Bay of Bengal, its water become salty as it heads towards the end of the River.

Baitarani basin, with its rich mineral and agricultural resources and with availability of cheap labour, offered an ideal ground for establishment and operation of various industries. However, the principal development activities in the industrial, agricultural and mining sectors have contributed significantly towards deterioration in the water quality.

== Cultural impact ==
It forms part of the boundary between Balasore district and Undivided Cuttack district. There is a saying that "he who bathes in it and gives alms will always be free from torments inflicted by Yama."

The district Jajpur is the gift of river Baitarani. Historical evidences show early civilization on the bank of this river. Currently the district is subject to massive floods which are common during monsoon.
