= Jajpur =

City in Odisha, India

- Town
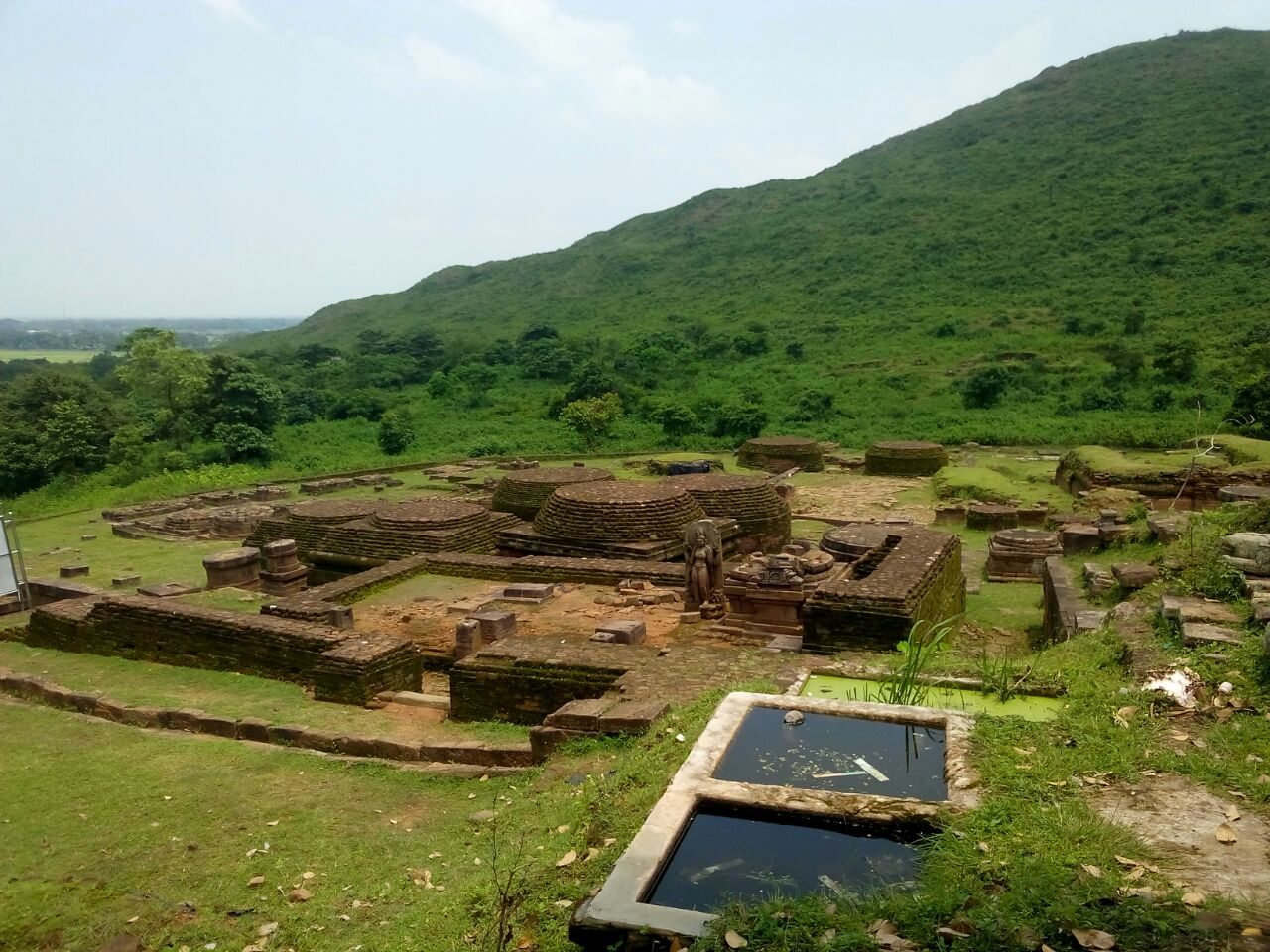
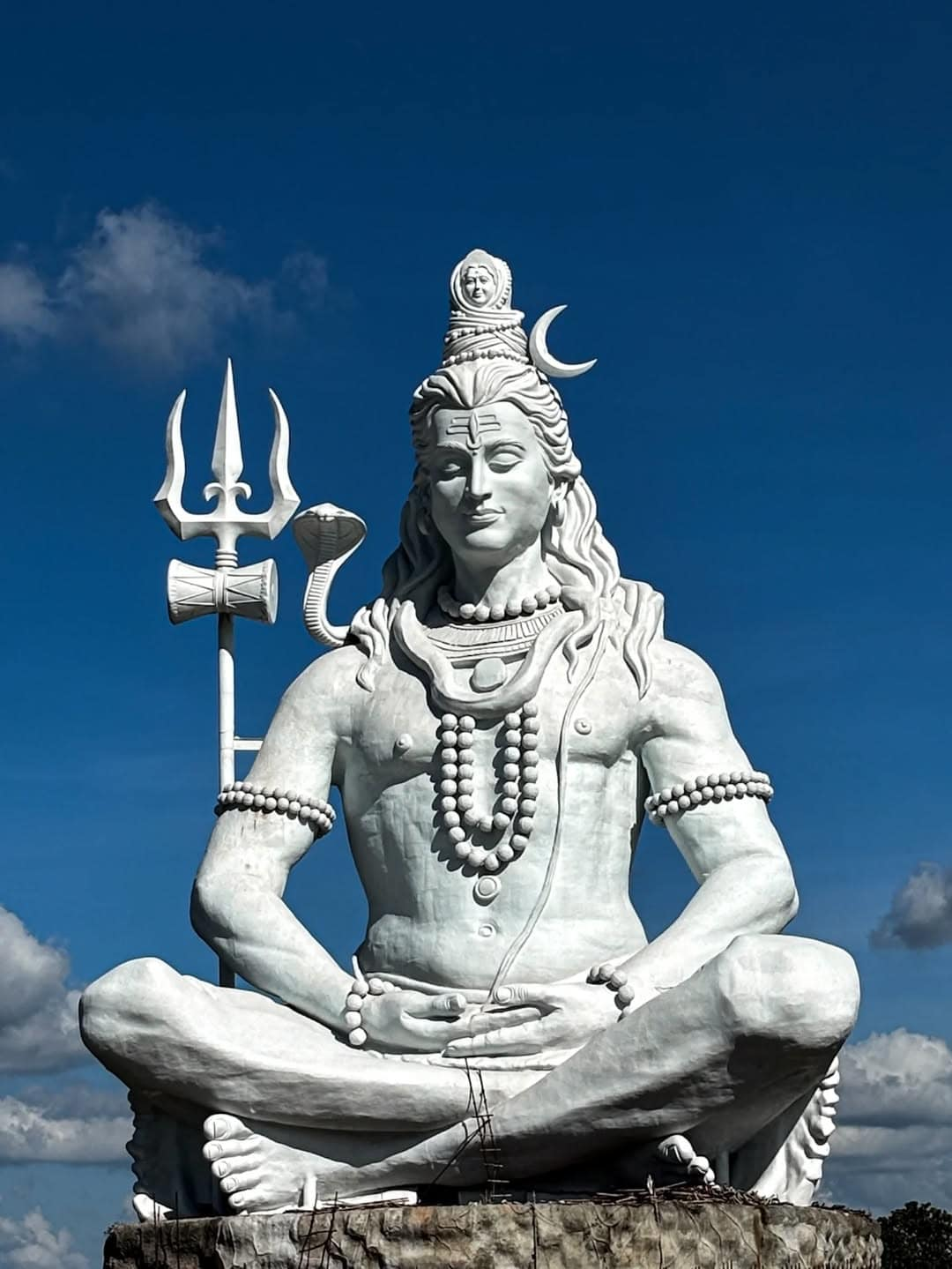
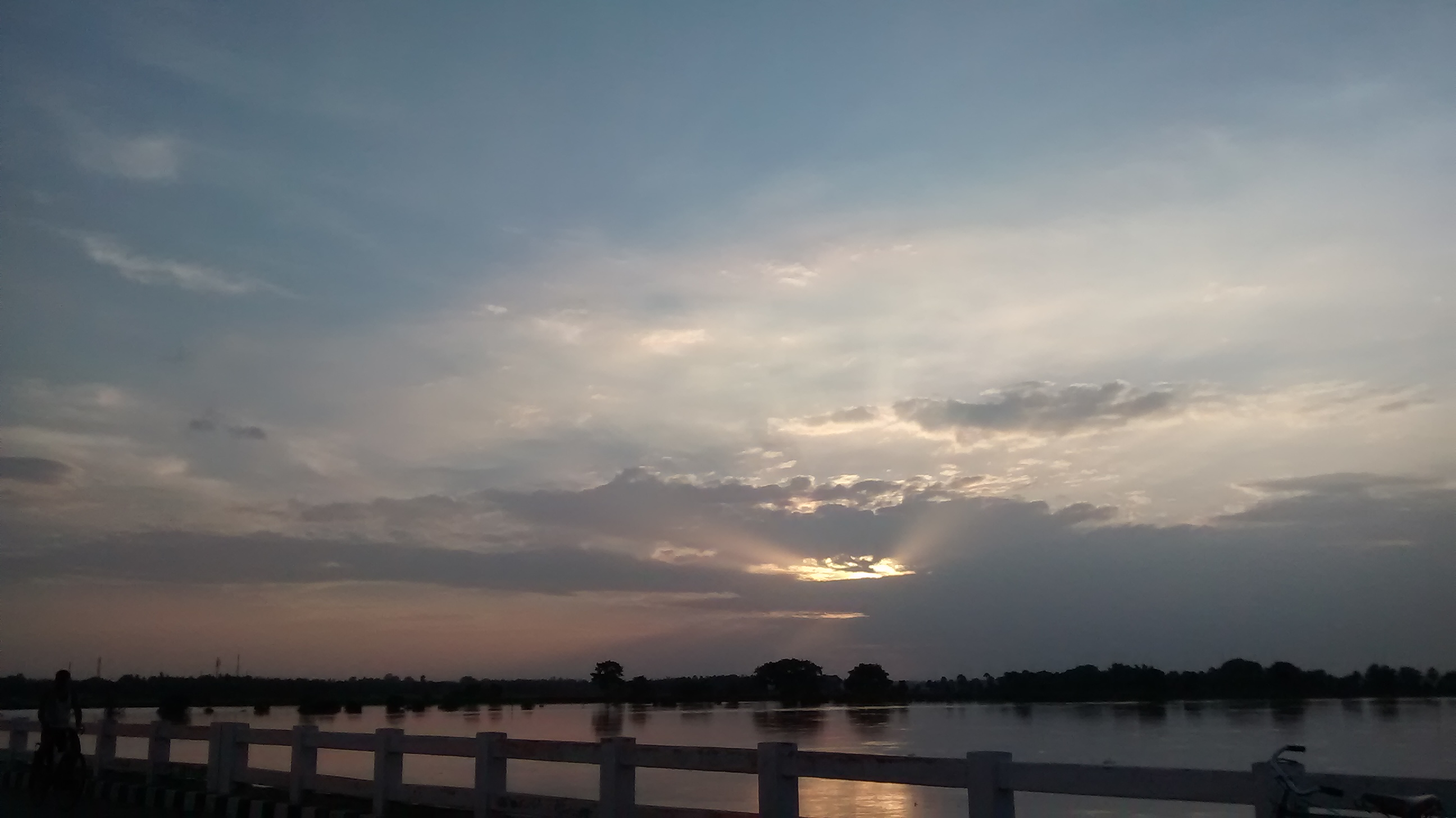
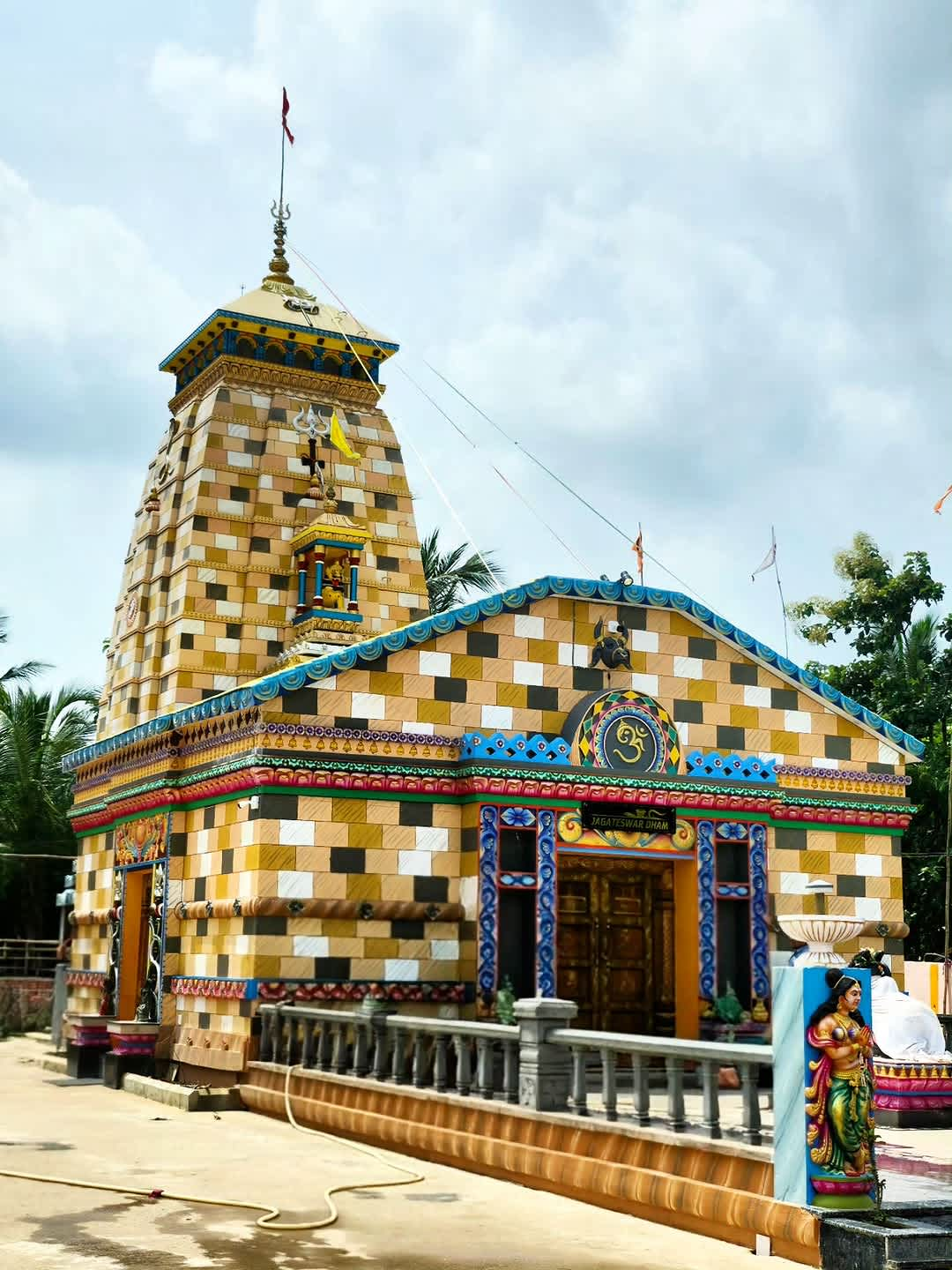
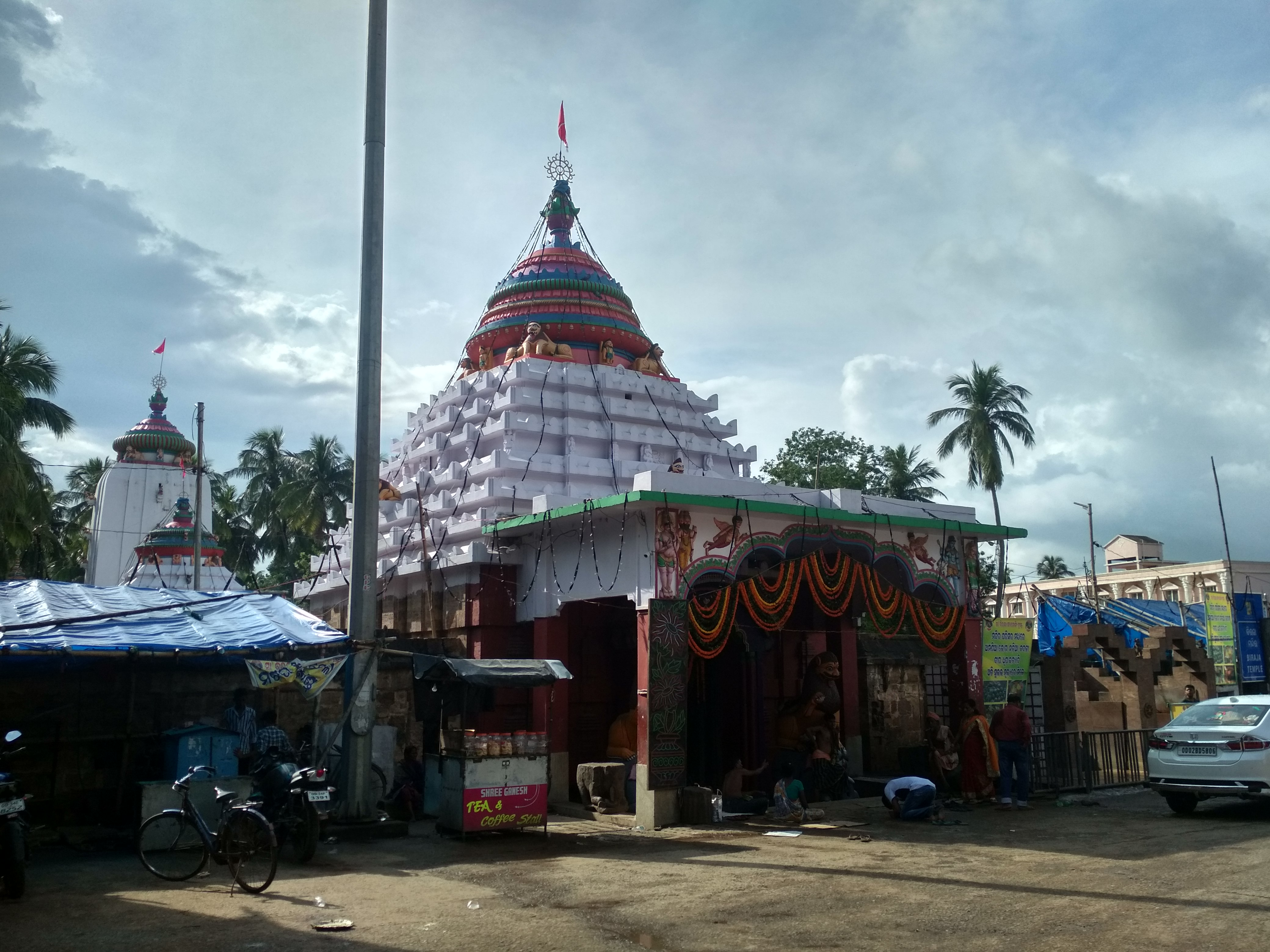
- From top, left to right: View of Ratnagiri, Odisha, Meditating Shiva statue, Baitarani River, Jagateswar Temple, Jajpur, Biraja Temple

- Location in Odisha, India Jajpur (India)
- Coordinates: 20.85°N 86.33°E
- Country: India
- State: Odisha
- district: Jajpur
- Established: 10th century
- Founder: Jajati Keshari

Government
  - Type: Municipality
  - Collector and District Magistrate of Jajpur: Singh Rathore
  - Superintendent of Police: Shri Rahul P R

Area
  - Total: 2,887.69 km^{2} (1,114.94 sq mi)
- Elevation: 8 m (26 ft)

Population (2011)
  - Total: 37,458
  - Density: 620/km^{2} (1,600/sq mi)

Languages
  - Official: Odia
- Time zone: UTC+5:30 (IST)
- Postal code: 755...
- Vehicle registration: OD-04 &OD-34
- Website: www.jajpur.nic.in

Jajpur (also known as Jajapur) is a town and a municipality in Jajpur district in the Indian state of Odisha. It was the capital of the Kesari dynasty, later supplanted by Cuttack. It is the headquarter of Jajpur district.

== Etymology and names ==
Jajpur, the place of the ancient Biraja Temple, was originally known as Biraja. Other names of the town in the ancient texts include Viranja, Varanja-nagara, Varaha-tirtha. The Bhauma-Kara kings established their capital city of Guhadevapataka (or Guheshvarapataka), identified with modern Gohiratikar (or Gohiratikra) near Jajpur. The later Somavanshi kings moved their capital from Yayatinagara (modern Binka) to Guheshvarapataka, and renamed the town Abhinava-Yayatinagara ("the new city of Yayati").

Later, the Jajpur town came to be known as Yajanagara. According to one theory, this name is a corruption of "Yayatinagara". Another theory is that it derives from the Brahmanical sacrifices (Yajna) that became popular during the Ganga-Gajapati period (11th-16th century). In the Muslim chronicles such as Tabaqat-i-Nasiri and Tarikh-i-Firuzshahi, the town's name was mentioned as "Jajnagar". Later, the suffix "-nagar" ("town") was replaced with the equivalent "-pur", and the town's name became "Jajpur".

== History ==
Jajpur was the capital of Keshari King Yayati Keshari in 473 CE. Accounts by Chinese travelers mention Jajpur as capital in 7th century. It has been a center of Tantrism. It was the capital of the Buddhist kingdom of Bhauma Karas in the 8th century CE. Many Buddhist structures have been unearthed in and around Jajpur including in Ratnagiri, Udayagiri and Lalitagiri that point to the Buddhist past of the town.

== Geography and climate ==
Jajpur

Climate chart (precipitation, max. and min. temperature)
J	F	M	A	M	J	J	A	S	O	N	D
41 29 15	26 32 19	28 35 23	49 37 25	131 38 26	243 35 26	341 32 26	401 32 25	270 32 25	196 32 23	37 31 19	39 29 15
- █ Average max. and min. temperatures in °C
- █ Precipitation totals in mm
Imperial conversion
J	F	M	A	M	J	J	A	S	O	N	D
1.6 85 59	1 90 66	1.1 96 73	1.9 99 77	5.1 100 79	9.6 94 79	13 90 78	16 89 78	11 90 77	7.7 90 74	1.5 87 66	1.5 84 59
- █ Average max. and min. temperatures in °F
- █ Precipitation totals in inches

Jajpur is located at 20.85°N 86.33°E and has an average elevation of 8 metres (26 ft). The climate of Jajpur District is normal as per Indian standards. All the seasons arrive in the District at their usual time. The District's average height from the sea level is 331 m and its average rain fall is 1014.5 mm. The average maximum and minimum temperatures are 40 degree C and 10 degree C respectively. Overall, the climate of the District is neither hotter nor cooler. The summer season is from March to June when the climate is hot and humid. Thunderstorms are common at the height of the summer. The monsoon months are from July to October when the town receives most of its rainfall from the South West Monsoon. The annual rainfall is around 1014.5 mm. The winter season from November to February is characterised by mild temperatures and occasional showers.

Climate data for Jajpur
Month	Jan	Feb	Mar	Apr	May	Jun	Jul	Aug	Sep	Oct	Nov	Dec	Year
Mean daily maximum °C (°F)	29.2 (84.6)	32.3 (90.1)	35.4 (95.7)	37.0 (98.6)	37.5 (99.5)	34.7 (94.5)	32.3 (90.1)	31.8 (89.2)	32.3 (90.1)	32.0 (89.6)	30.7 (87.3)	29.0 (84.2)	32.9 (91.1)
Mean daily minimum °C (°F)	15.2 (59.4)	18.7 (65.7)	22.6 (72.7)	25.0 (77.0)	26.2 (79.2)	26.1 (79.0)	25.5 (77.9)	25.3 (77.5)	25.0 (77.0)	23.3 (73.9)	19.1 (66.4)	15.0 (59.0)	22.3 (72.1)
Average precipitation mm (inches)	41.3 (1.63)	26.0 (1.02)	27.8 (1.09)	48.5 (1.91)	130.6 (5.14)	243.4 (9.58)	340.6 (13.41)	401.1 (15.79)	269.5 (10.61)	195.8 (7.71)	37.2 (1.46)	38.5 (1.52)	1,800.3 (70.87)
Source: Jajpur Weather

== Demographics ==
Historical population
Year	Pop.	±%
1872	10,753	—
1881	11,233	+4.5%
1891	11,992	+6.8%
1901	12,111	+1.0%
1911	12,241	+1.1%
1921	11,015	−10.0%
1931	10,673	−3.1%
1941	11,188	+4.8%
1951	11,026	−1.4%
1961	13,802	+25.2%
1971	16,707	+21.0%
1981	22,231	+33.1%
1991	27,312	+22.9%
2001	32,239	+18.0%
2011		—
Source: Census of India

As of 2011 Indian Census, Jajpur municipality had a population of 37,458, of which 19,216 were males and 18,242 females. The population within the age group of 0 to 6 years was 3,823. The total number of literates in Jajpur was 29,975, which constituted 80.0% of the population with male literacy at 83.5% and female literacy at 76.4%. The effective literacy rate of 7+ population of Jajpur was 89.1%, of which male literacy rate was 92.9% and female literacy rate 85.1%. The Scheduled Castes and Scheduled Tribes population was 6,363 and 565 respectively. Jajpur had 8198 households in 2011.

== Education ==
=== Colleges ===
- N.C. Autonomous College
- S G College
- V. N. Autonomous College
- Maharaja Jajati Keshari Medical College and Hospital, Ankula, Jajpur Town

=== High schools ===
- G C Highschool

== See also ==
- Chari Kshetra
