= Jajpur Lok Sabha constituency =

Lok Sabha constituency in Odisha

Coordinates: 20.831457°N 86.328803°E

Jajpur (SC) OD-8
- Lok Sabha constituency
- Interactive Map Outlining Jajpur Lok Sabha constituency

Constituency details
- Country: India
- Region: East India
- State: Odisha
- Assembly constituencies: Binjharpur; Bari; Barachana; Dharmasala; Jajpur; Korei; Sukinda
- Established: 1952
- Total electors: 1,54,8594 (Note: as on 2024) (Note: as data published by election commission)
- Reservation: SC

Member of Parliament
- 18th Lok Sabha
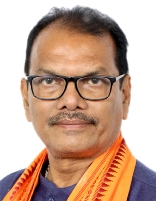
- Incumbent Rabindra Narayan Behera
- Party: BJP
- Elected year: 2024

Jajpur Lok Sabha constituency is one of the 21 Lok Sabha (parliamentary) constituencies in Odisha state in eastern India.

== Assembly Segments ==
Following delimitation, this constituency presently comprises the following legislative assembly segments:

#	Name	District	Member	Party	Leading (in 2024)
48	Binjharpur (SC)	Jajpur	Pramila Mallik	BJD	BJP
49	Bari	Jajpur	Biswa Ranjan Mallick	BJD	BJD
50	Barachana	Jajpur	Amar Kumar Nayak	BJP	BJP
51	Dharmasala	Jajpur	Himanshu Sekhar Sahoo	IND	BJD
52	Jajpur	Jajpur	Sujata Sahu	BJD	BJP
53	Korei	Jajpur	Akash Dasnayak	BJP	BJP
54	Sukinda	Jajpur	Pradeep Bal Samanta	BJP	BJP

Before delimitation in 2008, legislative assembly segments which constituted this parliamentary constituency were: Sukinda, Korei, Jajpur, Dharmasala, Barchana, Bari-Derabisi and Binjharpur.

== Elected members ==
Vote share of winning candidates
2024	46.01%
2019	49.77%
2014	41.52%
2009	35.32%
2004	51.61%
1999	59.19%
1998	45.72%
1996	46.34%
1991	46.1%
1989	52.74%
1984	54.1%
1980	54.5%
1977	55.56%
1971	50.53%

Since its formation in 1952, 17 elections have been held till date.

List of members elected from Jajpur constituency are

Year	Member	Party
1952	Bhubananda Das	Indian National Congress
1952	Lakshmi Dhar Jena	Ganatantra Parishad
1956-1961 : Constituency did not exist
1962	Rama Chandra Mallick	Indian National Congress
1967	Baidhar Behara	Praja Socialist Party
1971	Anadi Charan Das	Indian National Congress
1977	Rama Chandra Mallick	Bharatiya Lok Dal
1980	Anadi Charan Das	Indian National Congress (I)
1984	Anadi Charan Das	Indian National Congress
1989	Anadi Charan Das	Janata Dal
1991	Anadi Charan Das	Janata Dal
1996	Anchal Das	Janata Dal
1998	Rama Chandra Mallick	Indian National Congress
1999	Jagannath Mallick	Biju Janata Dal
2004	Mohan Jena	Biju Janata Dal
2009	Mohan Jena	Biju Janata Dal
2014	Rita Tarai	Biju Janata Dal
2019	Sarmistha Sethi	Biju Janata Dal
2024	Rabindra Narayan Behera	Bharatiya Janata Party

== Election result ==
=== 2024 ===
Voting were held on 1st June 2024 in 7th phase of Indian General Election. Counting of votes was on 4th June 2024. In 2024 election, Bharatiya Janata Party candidate Rabindra Narayan Behera defeated Biju Janata Dal candidate Sarmistha Sethi by a margin of 1,587 votes.

2024 Indian general election: Jajpur
Party	Candidate	Votes	%	±%
BJP	Rabindra Narayan Behera	534,239	46.01	▲5.51
BJD	Sarmistha Sethi	5,32,652	45.87	▼3.94
INC	Anchal Das	53,145	4.58	▼3.05
NOTA	None of the above	6,788	0.58	▼0.08
Majority		1,587	0.14	▼9.17
Turnout		11,61,596	75.01	▲0.91
BJP gain from BJD		Swing		

=== 2019 ===
In 2019 election, Biju Janata Dal candidate Sarmistha Sethi defeated Bharatiya Janata Party candidate Amiya Kanta Mallick by a margin of 1,01,693 votes.

2019 Indian general elections: Jajpur
Party	Candidate	Votes	%	±%
BJD	Sarmistha Sethi	544,020	49.81	▼5.40
BJP	Amiya Kanta Mallick	4,42,327	40.5	▲25.13
INC	Manas Jena	83,321	7.63	▼14.91
NOTA	None of the above	7,161	0.66	
SUCI(C)	Subasa Chandra Malik	4,950	0.45	
PBI	Tilottama Sethy	4,470	0.41	
BMP	Ranjit Malik	2,049	0.19	
JPJD	Sunakar Behera	1,985	0.18	
FPI	Bhimasen Behera	1,801	0.16	
Majority		1,01,693	9.31	
Turnout		10,92,965	74.10	
BJD hold				

=== 2014 ===
In 2014 election, Biju Janata Dal candidate Rita Tarai defeated Indian National Congress candidate Ashok Das by a margin of 3,20,271 votes.

2014 Indian general elections: Jajpur
Party	Candidate	Votes	%	±%
BJD	Rita Tarai	541,349	55.21	
INC	Ashok Das	2,21,078	22.54	
BJP	Amiya Kanta Mallick	1,50,789	15.37	
Independent	Nabin Kumar Dalai	29,142	2.97	
NOTA	None of the above	8,655	0.88	
AAP	Kalandi Mallik	8,269	0.84	
SUCI(C)	Subash Chandra Mallik	8,065	0.82	
BSP	Debendra Mallik	6,926	0.70	
BMP	Ranjit Mallik	3,409	0.34	
SKD	Gayadhar Mallik	2,753	0.28	
Majority		3,20,271	32.67	−
Turnout		9,81,780	75.31	
BJD hold				

=== 2009 ===
In 2009 election, Biju Janata Dal candidate Mohan Jena defeated Indian National Congress candidate Amiya Kanta Mallik by a margin of 1,27,747 votes.

2009 Indian general elections: Jajpur
Party	Candidate	Votes	%	±%
BJD	Mohan Jena	433,350	35.32	
INC	Amiya Kanta Mallik	305,603	24.9	
BJP	Parameswar Sethi	48,890	3.98	
Majority		1,27,747	15.64	
Turnout		8,17,108	66.59	
BJD hold				
