= Vishnu temples in Odisha =

This is a list of famous Vishnu temples present in Odisha.

1. Jagannath Temple - Puri
2. Neela Madhava Temple - Kantilo
3. Madhava Temple - Cuttack
4. Sakhigopal Temple - Sakhigopal
5. Khirachora Gopinatha Temple - Remuna
6. Ananta Vasudeva Temple - Bhubaneswar
7. Chhatia Bata - Chandikhol
