= Taharpur =

Taharpur may refer to:

- Taharpur, Suroth, a village in Hindaun City Tahshil, Karauli District, Rajasthan, India
- Taharpur, Agra, a village in Agra District, Uttar Pradesh, India
- Taharpur, Jajpur, a village in Jajpur District, Orissa, India
- Taharpur, Shahid Bhagat Singh Nagar, a village in Shahid Bhagat Singh Nagar District, Punjab, India
- Taharpur, Thane, a village in Thane District, Maharashtra, India
