= Baghuapal railway station =

Railway station in Odisha, India

Baghuapal

General information
- Location: Baghuapal, Odisha; India
- Coordinates: 21°02′31″N 86°00′47″E
- System: Indian Railways station
- Owner: Ministry of Railways, Indian Railways
- Line: Howrah–Chennai main line
- Platforms: 1
- Tracks: 1

Construction
- Structure type: Standard (on ground)
- Parking: No

Other information
- Status: Functioning
- Station code: BGPL
- Zone(s): East Coast Railway
- Division(s): Khurda Road
Location
- Location within India Location within Odisha

Baghuapal railway station is a railway station on the East Coast Railway network in the state of Odisha, India. It serves Baghuapal village. Its code is BGPL. It has one platform. Passenger, MEMU, Express trains halt at Baghuapal railway station.

== Major trains ==
- Puri–Barbil Express
- Khurda Road-Kendujhargarh MEMU
- Paradeep-Kendujhargarh MEMU

== See also ==
- Jajpur district
