= Kalinganagar =

- Town
- Location in Odisha, India Kalinganagar (India)
- Coordinates: 20°56′45″N 86°7′45″E
- Country: India
- State: Odisha
- District: Jajpur

Languages
  - Official: Odia
- Time zone: UTC+5:30 (IST)
- Vehicle registration: OD
- Website: www.kndajprd.nic.in

Kalinganagar is a planned industrial town in Jajpur district of coastal Odisha, India. A large number of steel plants including projects by Jindal Steel, VISA Steel and Tata Steel are in various stages of implementation.

The government of India has given final approval to develop the Kalinganagar complex as a National Investment Manufacturing Zone under the National Manufacturing Policy.

== History ==
Kalinganagar is a geographical unit named by the Odisha Industrial Infrastructure Development Corporation (IDCO) where the Govt. of Odisha aims at developing a steel-producers-hub. The process started in the early 1990s when the ex-CM, Biju Patanaik, took the lead role in promoting the steel-hub. He invited Swaraj Paul, a NRI British industrialist to set up a steel plant which did not materialize. Later, industrial activity grew when his son Naveen Patnaik became the CM of Odisha. Now there are around 15 plants operating in the region.

On 2 January 2006 about 800 tribals protested against the IDCO, they allege that IDCO has been acquiring their lands either through force or at a low price and selling the same land to various companies at a high price. They also allege that they were not consulted or provided with access to information, and are excluded from the decision-making processes that affect their livelihood.The Special Armed Police Forces carried out a firing in which 13 tribals were killed and more than 40 of were wounded.

== Geography ==
Kalinganagar is situated in Jajpur District of Odisha, India. It is located at latitude 200 45’ N and longitude 850 50’ E. It has an average elevation of 51 m (167 ft) above mean sea level.

== Economy ==
Kalinganagar is a global steel hub of international business and commerce having many manufacturing companies and corporations established. The town is a major center for banking and finance, retailing, steel, coal, iron, cromite mines trade, transportation, real estate, as well as traditional advertising, legal services, accountancy, insurance, theater, fashion, and the arts in the India.

IDCO has prepared plan for Kalinganagar industrial complex. It has both public steel company like NINL and many private steel companies such as Tata Steel, Tata Power, Jindal Steel, VISA Steel, Mesco etc. and other companies like Emami, Container Corporation etc. Kalinga Nagar Development Authority (KNDA) will take over all development, planning and building regulations.

== Transport ==
The nearest railway stations are Jajpur Keonjhar Road railway station, Baghuapal Railway Station, Sukinda Road Railway Station and Jakhapura Railway Station. The nearest airport is Biju Patnaik International Airport in Bhubaneswar.

There are a lot of small railway stations in Kalinganagar. It is connected by Indian Railways through Jajpur-Keonjhar Road (JJKR) Railway Station, Baghuapal Railway Station, Sukinda Road Railway Station and Jakhapura Railway Station. It comes under East Coast Railways Zone of India Railways. National Highway−215 connect Kalinganagar with two way wide highways. It's well connected with Anandapur and Panikoili and is 100 km from Bhubaneswar and 400 km from Kolkata through National Highways. An inland Water Ways has been planned to connect Kalinganagar township with Dhamara Port, Odisha and Paradeep Port, Odisha. A domestic airport has been proposed at Ragadi for Kalinganagar.

== Health ==
Vyasanagar Municipality is having a sub-divisional hospital as per Odisha state norms. But it does not having much more facility as Kalinganagar is a rapidly growing city. So in case of any special health service or treatment, people of Kalinganagar have to go to Cuttack which is 65 km (40 mi) away. There is a long-standing demand for making a super specialist hospital by state government.

There are many nursing homes and private diagnostic centers which are operating in Vyasanagar municipality. Tata Steel is all set to establish a 200-bed hospital at Gobarghati in Kalinganagar industrial complex of Orissa's Jajpur district.

The hospital in Gobarghati rehabilitation colony is set up on an area of four acres of land. The setting up of this hospital is primarily dedicated to those families that were affected by Tata Steel's Greenfield project at Kalinganagar, in the Jajpur district of Odisha and also for the people in periphery villages. It would be a 200-bed hospital and would cater to around 10000 people from the neighbouring villages apart from Tata Steel Parivar members.

The hospital would also be well equipped with round-the-clock service, pathology laboratory, OPD, an outdoor complex, paramedical staff and specialist doctors in Medicine, Paediatrics, Surgery and O&G. The ceremonial puja for this hospital has already been performed at Maniapatla. Mr. Hridayeshwar Jha, Vice President, Odisha Project of Tata Steel, graced this occasion. The hospital intends to plan health services like rural health check-up programmes, health camps during epidemics and awareness building activities for people once it is functional.

== Education ==
Kalinganagar has the following schools and colleges,

- Buchpan school, Kanheipur, Jajpur Road
- Saraswati Shishu Vidya Mandir
- V.N High School, Jajpur Road
- Doon International School
- St. Marys School, Jajpur Road
- Budharaja Bidyapitha-Danagadi
- Mount Litera Zee School
- Glorious English Medium School, Jajpur Road
- Stewart School, Sukhinda Chromite Mines
- Shemrock Golap Preschool, Kachahudi Hudisahi, Jajpur Road
- Dhabalgiri High School
- SBD International School, Santara, Patuli, Jajpur Road
- Ferrochrome High School
- V N High School, Jajpur Road
- St. Xavier's High School, Jajpur Road
- DAV Public School, Kendriya Vidyalaya (KV) and other national schools have been planned at Talagada, Jajpur Road in near future.
- Vyasanagar College Jajpur Road
- Indira Gandhi women's college, Jajpur Road
- Sukinda College, Sukinda
- Kapileswar Mahabidyalaya, Duburi
