= Khosalipur =

- village
- Location in Odisha, India Khosalipur (India)
- Coordinates: 20.704667°N 86.126473°E
- Country: India
- State: Odisha
- District: Jajpur

Area
  - Total: 0.5 km^{2} (0.19 sq mi)

Population (2011)
  - Total: 966
- Time zone: UTC+5:30 (IST)
- literacy rate: 77.74
- Sex ratio: 1.15

Khosalipur is a village in Jajpur district of Odisha, India.

== Demographics ==
According to the 2011 Census of India, Khosalipur had a population of 966 and a total area of 0.5 km^{2}. Males and females constituted 53.52 per cent and 46.48 per cent respectively of the population. Literacy at that time was 77.74 per cent. People classified as Scheduled Castes and Scheduled Tribes under India's system of positive discrimination accounted for 10.46 per cent and 9.52 per cent respectively of the population.
