= Rekhdeipur =

Rekhdeipur is a rural area of the Jajpur district in Orissa, India. It is situated in the border of Dhenkanal district.
