= Kalpataru Das =

Indian politician

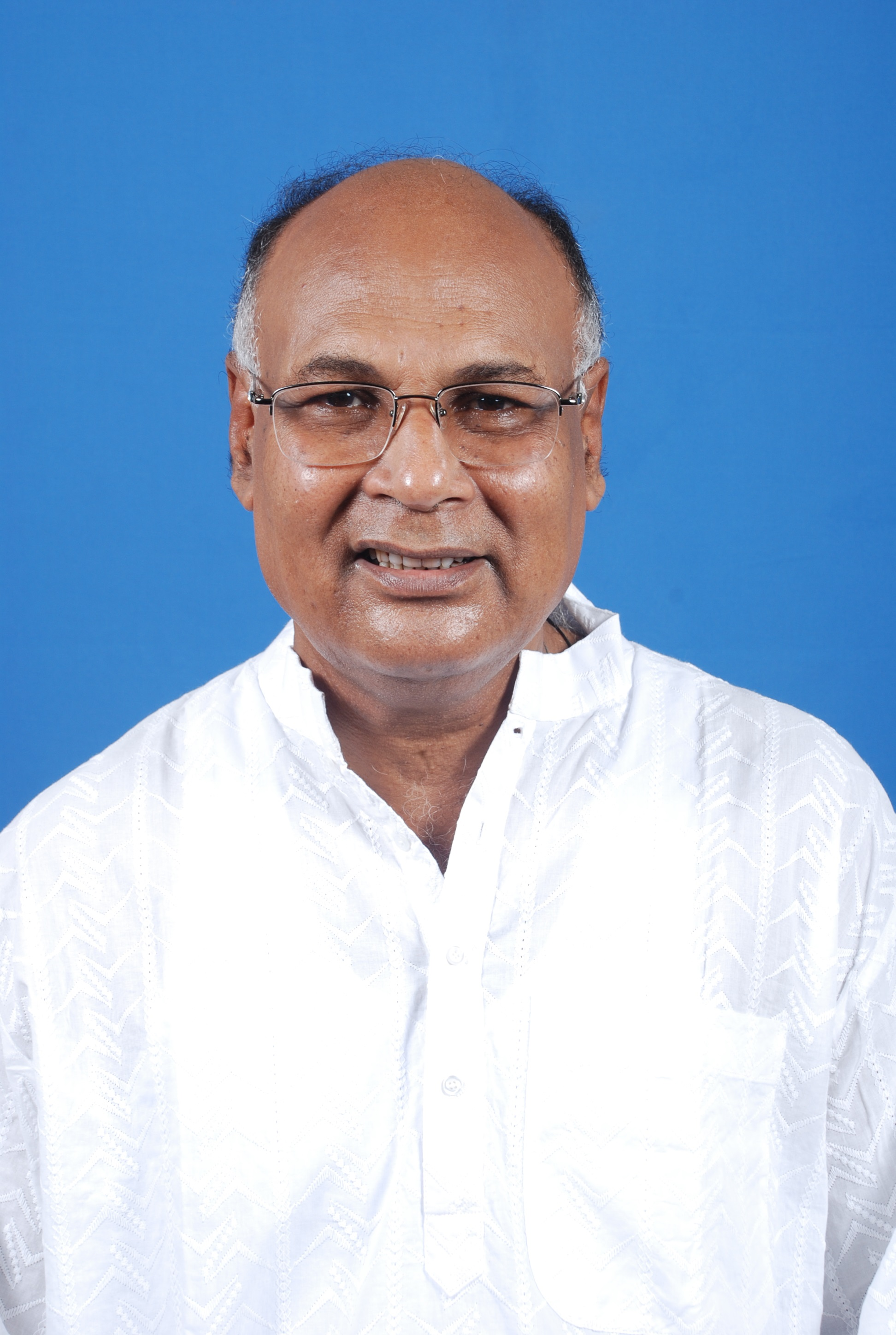
- Kalpataru Das is a male politician from Odisha, India

Member: Rajya Sabha
- In office 3 April 2014 – 25 July 2015

Member: Odisha Legislative Assembly
- In office 1995–2014
- Preceded by: Gurcharan Tikayat
- Succeeded by: Pranab Kumar Balabantaray
- Constituency: Dharmasala

Personal details
- Born: 7 February 1948 Bhotaka, Jajpur district, Odisha, India
- Died: 25 July 2015 (aged 67) Delhi, India
- Party: Biju Janata Dal(1997-2015)
- Other political affiliations: Janata Dal (1977-1980,1985-1997), BJP (1980-1985)
- Spouse: Pratimaa Das
- Children: 3 sons (including Pranab Balabantaray)
- Occupation: Politician

Kalpataru Das (7 February 1948 – 25 July 2015) was an Indian politician from the Odisha state. He belonged to the Biju Janata Dal (BJD) party. He won the Odisha Legislative Assembly election, 1995 from Dharmasala constituency of Jajpur district, which he held consecutively from 1995 to 2014. On 2 August 2012, he was given the portfolio of Panchayati Raj Minister. From 3 April 2014, he was an MP of Rajya Sabha. In 2013, he was State Panchayati Raj Minister and Parliamentary Affairs Minister. He died on 25 July 2015, aged 67. He was cremated on Sunday evening at Bhotaka in Tehsil Kuakhia, Jajpur district, from where he belonged, by his eldest son BJD MLA Pranab Balabantaray.
