= Anchal Das =

Indian politician

Member of Parliament, Lok Sabha
- In office 1996–1998
- Preceded by: Anadi Charan Das
- Succeeded by: Rama Chandra Mallick
- Constituency: Jajpur

Personal details
- Party: Indian National Congress
- Other political affiliations: Janata Dal

Anchal Das is an Indian politician and a veteran leader in the Indian National Congress. He was a Lok Sabha MP from 1996 to 1998, elected from Jaipur (SC). He has been fielded as the Congress candidate from Jajpur in the 2024 Indian general election. He used to be a member of the erstwhile Janata Dal.
