= Neulpur =

Neulpur is a village near Chandikhole in Jajpur district, Odisha, India.
