= Kiapada =

- Village
- Location in Odisha, India Kiapada (India)
- Coordinates: 21.053211°N 86.094320°E
- Country: India
- State: Odisha
- District: Jajpur

Government
  - Body: Panchayat

Languages
  - Official: Oriya
- Time zone: UTC+5:30 (IST)
- PIN: 755019
- Vehicle registration: OD
- Distance from Bhubaneswar: 120 kilometres (75 mi) (land)
- Distance from Jajpur: 15 kilometres (9.3 mi) (land)
- Avg. summer temperature: 43°C
- Avg. winter temperature: 10 °C
- Website: odisha.gov.in

Kiapada is a village in Jajpur District of Odisha, India. It is located at a distance of 120 km from Bhubaneswar, the capital city of Odisha.
