= Pranab Prakash Das =

Indian politician

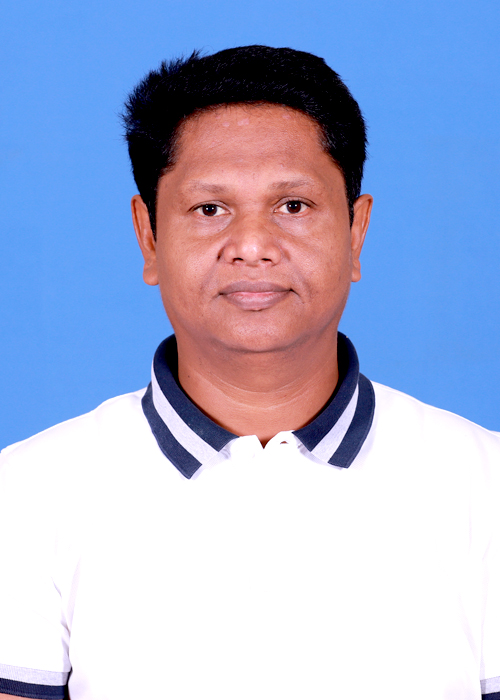
- Official mla portrait of 2014

Member of the Odisha Legislative Assembly
- In office 19 May 2009 – 4 June 2024
- Preceded by: Parameswar Sethi
- Succeeded by: Sujata Sahu
- Constituency: Jajpur

Minister of State (Independent Charge) for Energy, Electronics & Information Technology
- In office 21 May 2014 – 6 May 2017
- Premier: Naveen Patnaik
- Governor: S. C. Jamir

Personal details
- Born: 4 May 1972 (age 54) Jajpur, Odisha, India
- Party: Biju Janata Dal
- Parent(s): Ashok Kumar Das (father); Sandhyarani Das (mother)
- Relatives: Arindam Ray (brother-in-law)
- Profession: Politician, agriculturist

Pranab Prakash Das (born 4 May 1972), endearingly known as "Bobby Das", is an Indian politician from Odisha. He served as a three-time elected Member of the Odisha Legislative Assembly representing the Jajpur Assembly constituency from 2009 to 2024. He is a senior leader of the Biju Janata Dal (BJD) and has served as the party's Organizational Secretary.

== Early life and family ==
Das was born on 4 May 1972 in Jajpur, Odisha. He belongs to a prominent Karan family; his father, Ashok Kumar Das, was a heavyweight politician, former Leader of the Opposition in the Odisha Legislative Assembly, and a close associate of Biju Patnaik. His mother, Sandhyarani Das, contested the 2024 Odisha Legislative Assembly election from the Korei constituency. His sister is married to the Ollywood actor-politician Arindam Ray.

== Political career ==
Das entered active politics following his father's legacy and contested the 2009 assembly elections from Jajpur on a Biju Janata Dal ticket. He successfully retained the seat during the 2014 and 2019 state elections.

In May 2014, he was inducted into the state cabinet under Chief Minister Naveen Patnaik, serving as the Minister of State (Independent Charge) for Energy, Electronics, and Information Technology until May 2017. In March 2020, he was appointed as the Organizational Secretary of the Biju Janata Dal, making him one of the top strategists within the party hierarchy.
