= Khosalpur =

- village
- Location in Odisha, India Khosalpur (India)
- Coordinates: 20.960756°N 86.103942°E
- Country: India
- State: Odisha
- District: Jajpur

Area
  - Total: 0.32 km^{2} (0.12 sq mi)

Population (2011)
  - Total: 262
- Time zone: UTC+5:30 (IST)
- literacy rate: 73.28
- Sex ratio: 0.91

Khosalpur is a village in Jajpur district of Odisha, India.

== Demographics ==
According to the 2011 Census of India, Khosalpur had a population of 262 and a total area of 0.32 km^{2}. Males and females constituted 47.7 per cent and 52.3 per cent respectively of the population. Literacy at that time was 73.28 per cent. People classified as Scheduled Castes under India's system of positive discrimination accounted for 62.2 per cent of the population.
