= Hadidas =

Odia Hindu devotee, saint and poet

- Born: 1772; Champapur, Jajpur district
- Died: 1837 (aged 64–65)
- Occupation: Saint poet
- Spouse: Padmabati
- Parent(s): Chemei Ojha, Debaki

Hadi Das (1772-1837), was an Odia Hindu devotee of Odisha in the early 18th century.

== Early life ==
Hadi Das, a saint from Odisha, was born at Champapur just one km from Chhatia in the state of Odisha in 1772 A.D. to the parents Chemei Ojha and Devaki of a Kamar (blacksmith) family. His parent had lost all the children before Hadi Das was born. For this reason his parent out of love and affection named the child as "Hadi" (a low caste). Actually his real name was Hadi Das (the servant of vishnu).

== A Spiritual Teacher ==
His spiritual teacher was Mastaram Das, a saint from western India residing at Puri at that time. Hadi Das came in contact with him and was inspired by him for his spiritual and divine power and admitted him as his spiritual teacher. Hadi Das chose for his ancestral occupation a place at Chhatia called Kalagiri surrounded by trees and bushes. The Bata or the tree under which he was working is said to be still preserved as a symbol.

== Literary works ==
The future prophecies, the past and the present activity of the people, the truth of spiritual doctrines are displayed through his countless Bhajanas, Malika and other spiritual texts like "Sankhanavi" "Ananta Gupta Gita", "Anantagoi", "Bhabananabara", "Hanumanta Gita", "Nila Madhava Gita" etc. His contributions and literary achievements have been appreciated in a thesis "Hadi Das Rachanabali" by a local educationalist Prof. R. Sahu.

After Hadi Das died in the late 1830 he was regarded as a saint of Orissa like Panchasakha. He was popularly known as twelfth incarnation of Mahapurusa Achutananda Das a great saint of Nemalabata.
