= Barchana =

Town in the Jajpur district of Odisha state

- Town
- Location in Odisha, India Barchana (India)
- Coordinates: 20.666°N 86.119°E
- Country: India
- State: Odisha
- District: Jajpur

Government
  - MLA: Amar Prasad Satapathy

Languages
  - Official: Odia
- Time zone: UTC+5:30 (IST)
- PIN: 758019
- Website: odisha.gov.in

Barchana or Badchana, is a town and community development block in the Jajpur district of Odisha state in India.

Barchana (Vidhan Sabha constituency) (Sl. No.: 50) is the Vidhan Sabha constituency. This constituency covers the voters of the Barachana block. In the 2019 Odisha Legislative Assembly election, Amar Prasad Satapathy was elected MLA.
