= Jajpur Assembly constituency =

Constituency of the Odisha legislative assembly in India

Coordinates: 20.84°N 86.33°E

Jajpur
- Constituency No. 52 for the Odisha Legislative Assembly

Constituency details
- Country: India
- Region: East India
- State: Odisha
- Division: Central Division
- District: Jajpur
- Lok Sabha constituency: Jajpur
- Established: 1951
- Total electors: 2,44,613 (Note: as on 2024) (Note: as data published by election commission)
- Reservation: None

Member of Legislative Assembly
- 17th Odisha Legislative Assembly
- Incumbent Sujata Sahu
- Party: Biju Janata Dal
- Elected year: 2024

Jajpur is a Vidhan Sabha constituency of Jajpur district, Odisha.

The areas in this constituency include Jajpur, 16 GPs (Basudevpur, Beruda, Bhubaneswarpur, Bhuinpur, Bichitrapur, Chainipur, Jahanpur, Khairabad, Mala Anandapur, Markandapur, Nathasahi, Panasa, Maheswarpur, Shyamadaspur, Similia and Upparbaruhan) of Jajpur block and 16 GPs (Susua, Duduranta, Kanikapada, Mangalpur, Akarapada, Champeipal, Chhachina, Chittalo, Dasrathpur, Gopalpur, Kasapa, Katikata, Khandara, Mallikapur, Taliha and Tarpada) of Dasarathpur block.

== Elected members ==
Vote share of winning candidates
| 2024 | 47.92% |
| 2019 | 60.24% |
| 2014 | 69.17% |
| 2009 | 50.05% |
| 2004 | 55.25% |
| 2000 | 46.82% |
| 1995 | 42.24% |
| 1990 | 57.12% |
| 1985 | 52.06% |
| 1980 | 54.61% |
| 1977 | 61.25% |

Since its formation in 1951, 18 elections were held till date including one bypoll in 1963. It was a 2-member constituency from 1952 to 1971.

List of members elected from Jajpur constituency are:

| Year | Member | Party |
|---|---|---|
| 2024 | Sujata Sahu | Biju Janata Dal |
| 2019 | Pranab Prakash Das | Biju Janata Dal |
| 2014 | Pranab Prakash Das | Biju Janata Dal |
| 2009 | Pranab Prakash Das | Biju Janata Dal |
| 2004 | Parameswar Sethi | Biju Janata Dal |
| 2000 | Suryamani Jena | Biju Janata Dal |
| 1995 | Suryamani Jena | Janata Dal |
| 1990 | Jagannath Mallik | Janata Dal |
| 1985 | Jagannath Mallik | Janata Party |
| 1980 | Niranjan Jena | Indian National Congress (I) |
| 1977 | Jagannath Mallik | Janata Party |
| 1974 | Jagannath Mallik | Utkal Congress |
| 1971 (Note: It was a 2 member constituency) | Jagannath Mallik | Utkal Congress |
| 1971 | Prafulla Chandra Ghadai (Note: from Jajpur West) | Indian National Congress |
| 1967 (Note: It was a 2 member constituency) | Santanu Kumar Das (Note: from Jajpur East (SC)) | Orissa Jana Congress |
| 1967 | Prafulla Chandra Ghadai (Note: from Jajpur West) | Orissa Jana Congress |
| 1963 (bypoll) (Note: from Jajpur West) (Note: Death of Madan Mohan Patnaik) | Narayan Chandra Pati | Indian National Congress |
| 1961 (Note: It was a 2 member constituency) | Santanu Kumar Das (Note: from Jajpur East (SC)) | Indian National Congress |
| 1961 | Madan Mohan Patnaik (Note: from Jajpur West) | Indian National Congress |
| 1957 (Note: It was a 2 member constituency) | Santanu Kumar Das | Indian National Congress |
| 1957 | Gadadhar Dutta | Indian National Congress |
| 1951 (Note: It was a 2 member constituency) | Santanu Kumar Das | Indian National Congress |
| 1951 | Gadadhar Dutta | Indian National Congress |

== Election results ==
=== 2024 ===
Voting were held on 1 June 2024 in 4th phase of Odisha Assembly Election & 7th phase of Indian General Election. Counting of votes was on 4 June 2024. In 2024 election, Biju Janata Dal candidate Sujata Sahu defeated Bharatiya Janata Party candidate Goutam Ray by 2,564 votes.

2024 Odisha Vidhan Sabha Election, Jajpur
| Party | Candidate | Votes | % | ±% |
|---|---|---|---|---|
| BJD | Sujata Sahu | 86,049 | 47.92 | ▼12.32 |
| BJP | Goutam Ray | 83,485 | 46.49 | ▲10.81 |
| INC | Sudip Kumar Kar | 6,477 | 3.61 | ▲0.74 |
| NOTA | None of the above | 1,230 | 0.68 | ▲0.16 |
| Majority | | 2,564 | | |
| Turnout | | 179,580 | 73.41 | |
| BJD hold | | | | |

=== 2019 ===
In the 2019 election, Biju Janata Dal candidate Pranab Prakash Das defeated Bharatiya Janata Party candidate Goutam Ray by 40,656 votes.

2019 Vidhan Sabha Election, Jajpur
| Party | Candidate | Votes | % | ±% |
|---|---|---|---|---|
| BJD | Pranab Prakash Das | 99,738 | 60.24 | −8.93 |
| BJP | Goutam Ray | 59,082 | 35.68 | 24.3 |
| INC | Santosh Kumar Nanda | 4,745 | 2.87 | −10.27 |
| NOTA | None of the above | 866 | 0.52 | −0.25 |
| Majority | | 40,656 | 24.56 | |
| Turnout | | 1,65,572 | 70.79 | |
| BJD hold | | | | |

=== 2014 ===
In 2014 election, Biju Janata Dal candidate Pranab Prakash Das defeated Indian National Congress candidate Santosh Kumar Nanda by huge margin of 84,613 votes.

2014 Vidhan Sabha Election, Jajpur
| Party | Candidate | Votes | % | ±% |
|---|---|---|---|---|
| BJD | Pranab Prakash Das | 104,458 | 69.17 | 19.12 |
| INC | Santosh Kumar Nanda | 19,845 | 13.14 | −12.38 |
| BJP | Jagannath Prasad Samal | 17,180 | 11.38 | −11.15 |
| NOTA | None | 1,167 | 0.77 | − |
| Majority | | 84,613 | 56.02 | |
| Turnout | | 1,51,026 | 72.89 | 9.05 |
| BJD hold | | | | |

=== 2009 ===
In 2009 election, Biju Janata Dal candidate Pranab Prakash Das defeated Indian National Congress candidate Debabrata Kantha by 30,245 votes.

2009 Vidhan Sabha Election, Jajpur
| Party | Candidate | Votes | % | ±% |
|---|---|---|---|---|
| BJD | Pranab Prakash Das | 61,712 | 50.05 | − |
| INC | Debabrata Kantha | 31,467 | 25.52 | − |
| BJP | Goutam Ray | 27,785 | 22.53 | − |
| Majority | | 30,245 | 24.53 (Note: %of total valid votes) | − |
| Turnout | | 1,23,340 | 63.84 | − |
| BJD hold | | | | |
