= Vyasanagar College =

- Type: Public
- Established: 1966
- Affiliations: UGC
- President: Sri Sapan Kumar Nanda
- Principal: Sarat Kumar Mallick
- Faculty: 71
- Administrative staff: 37
- Students: 3600
- Undergraduates: 17 subjects
- Postgraduates: History, Commerce, Political Science
- Location: Vyasanagar, Odisha, India
- Campus: 26 acres (110,000 m^{2})
- Nickname: V.N. College
- Website: www.vnautocollege.org

Vyasanagar College, at Jajpur Road, Jajpur, is the 29th autonomous college of Odisha. Autonomous status was granted in February 2009, and renewed on 2016 by University Grants Commission (UGC) of India.

== History ==
The college started with arts subjects at the intermediate level. In 1966 the college got affiliated to Utkal University, Bhubaneshwar and thereafter higher classes were added.

The college got 2f and 12B status from the UGC in 1969. I.Com and I.Sc classes started in 1975 and 1978, respectively, whereas B.Com and B.Sc classes started in 1977 and 1981.

== Facilities ==
The college spreads across almost 26 acres. It enrolls more than 3600 students.

The college has a library with a study centre and computer point, sports facilities, shooting range, grievance redressal cell, parking shed and common room. The total built up area is about 106175 sq ft. with a sports ground of about 8 acres. The college has an adequate number of classrooms, lecture halls and laboratories. The college library holds about 46000 volumes, and 26 journals, periodicals and magazines.

=== Hostels and canteens ===
The college has one hostel for boys, two hostels for girls, and housing for faculty and a guest house. It also has a small canteen at the back side.

== Faculties and staff ==
The teaching staff includes 74 permanent faculty, eight part-time teachers, and 34 non-teaching and 31 technical staff. The student teacher ratio is 29:1.

== Academics ==
=== Admissions ===
Admission of students to the various courses of study is made on the basis of their academic records. As per the policy of the State Government, SC and ST students, students from other weaker sections, holders of merit certificates of NCC, NSS and sports are given preference in admission.

=== Courses offered ===
The college offers undergraduate education in Botany, Chemistry, Geology, Mathematics, Physics and Zoology for B.Sc., in English language, Education, Economics, History, Oriya, Philosophy, Political Science, Psychology and Sanskrit are offered under B.A. and under Accountancy and Management for B.Com, in total 17 options in undergraduate programs.

Since 2004, the college also offers self-financing programs at certificate/ diploma level in Computer Science, Refrigeration and Hospital Waste Management.

=== Examinations ===
The college has an annual system of examination. The test, mid-term and terminal examinations are conducted to check the progress of the students. This helps in mid-term course correction.

== Magazines ==
An annual college magazine, Vyasashree, and a wall magazine, Vyasaprava are published to encourage creativity among students.

== Future prospects ==
- With the rapid industrialization in the area nearby, Kalinganagar (the steel hub of India), and per the needs of the locality, the college may introduce additional courses such as Communicative English, Basic Computer Literacy, Travel and Tourism, Tax Planning, Management of Small Scale Industry Units, Event Management, Herbal and Medicinal Plant Nursery Management.
- More facilities and training may be provided to enable more students to succeed in examinations like UGC-CSIR (NET), SLET, GATE, Civil Services, GRE, TOEFL and GMAT.
- Further steps may be taken to connect the library with other libraries.
