= Managobinda Samal =

Indian politician

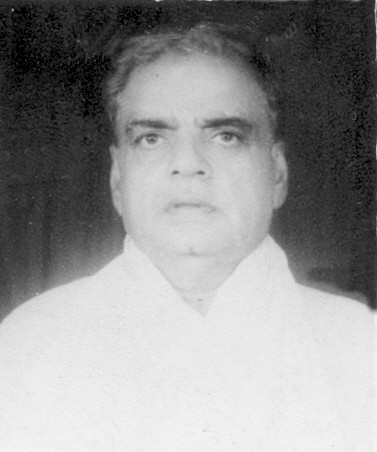

Personal details
- Born: Managobinda Samal; 5 September 1921 Kalashree Gopalpur, Jajpur, Odisha
- Died: 12 January 2003 (aged 81) Kalashree Gopalpur, Jajpur, Odisha
- Party: Janta Dal, Utkal Congress
- Spouse: Subhadra Samal
- Children: Late Prasanna Kumar Samal, Sarat Kumar Samal, Pradipta Kumar Samal, Late Santosh Kumar Samal
- Profession: Politician, Social Activist

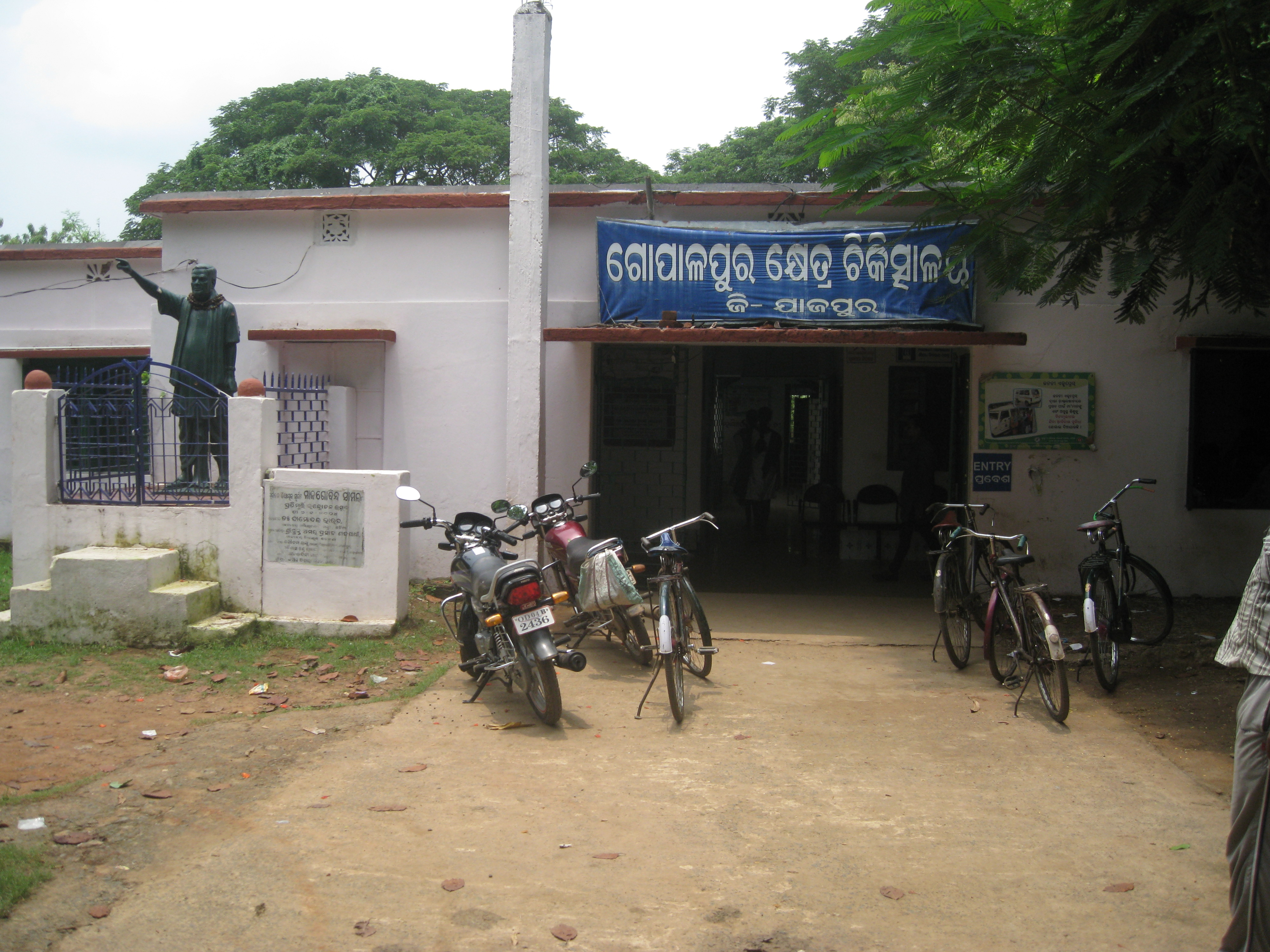
Statue of Mr. Managobinda Samal at Gopalpur Medical, Khadagpur, Jajpur, Odisha

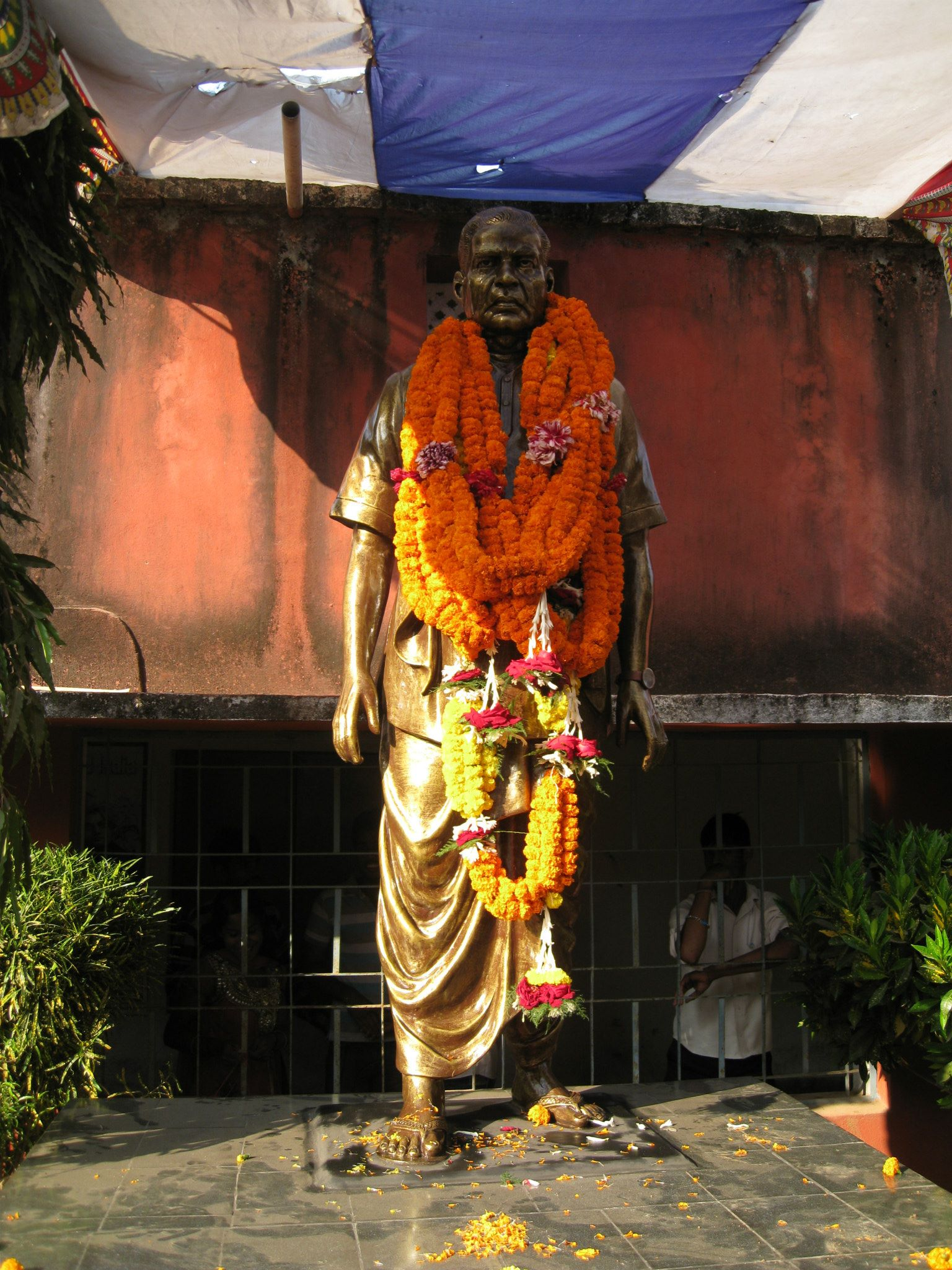
Statue of Managobinda Samal at Sahaspur College, Balichandrapur, Jajpur, Odisha

Managobinda Samal (1921–2003) was a politician and social activist born on 5 September 1921 at Kalashree Gopalpur, Jajpur, Odisha, India. He was elected twice as a Member of Legislative Assembly, Odisha from Barachana (Odisha Vidhan Sabha constituency).

== Early life ==
Managobinda Samal was educated at Salipur School, Cuttack District, Odisha. After school he was doing job at Kolkata. He joined Oriya Union at Kolkata. He came to odisha politics under the guidance of Nabakrushna Choudhuri.

== Entry into politics ==
Firstly Mana Babu was elected as Sarpanch of Kalashree Gopalpur Gram panchayat. He was also elected as Barchana Block Chairman. He contested from Barachana Vidhan Sabha Constituency as a Member of the Legislative Assembly from 1971 to 1985. He was elected twice as a Member of the Legislative Assembly from Barachana Vidhan Sabha Constituency.

Odisha Vidhan Sabha Constituency	Year	Party	Result
Barachana	1985	Janta	Lost
Barachana	1980	Janta	Lost
Barachana	1977	Janta	Won
Barachana	1974	Utkal Congress	Lost
Barachana	1971	Utkal Congress	Won

== Organisations founded by Managobinda Samal ==
Mana Babu was a well known person for founding different schools, colleges & hospitals in Barachana Block. He gave employment to many people of Barachana Vidhan Sabha Constituency.

Below are the organisations founded by Mana Babu.

1. Sahaspur College, Balichandrapur, Jajpur, Odisha
2. Gopalpur Medical, Khadagpur, Jajpur, Odisha
3. Balichandrapur High School, Jajpur, Odisha
4. Barachana Girls High School, Jajpur, Odisha
5. Kalashree U.G.M.E. School, Jajpur, Odisha
6. Gajendrapur Veterinary Medical, Jajpur, Odisha
