= Bari, Odisha Assembly constituency =

Constituency of the Odisha legislative assembly in India

Coordinates: 20.70°N 86.35°E

Bari
- Constituency No. 49 for the Odisha Legislative Assembly

Constituency details
- Country: India
- Region: East India
- State: Odisha
- Division: Central Division
- District: Jajpur
- Lok Sabha constituency: Jajpur
- Established: 1974
- Total electors: 2,27,157 (Note: as on 2024) (Note: as data published by election commission)
- Reservation: None

Member of Legislative Assembly
- 17th Odisha Legislative Assembly
- Incumbent Biswa Ranjan Mallick
- Party: Biju Janata Dal
- Elected year: 2024

Bari is a Vidhan Sabha constituency of Jajpur district, Odisha.

The area of this constituency includes Bari block and 8 GPs (Badasuar, Chhatisdebil, Erabanka, Jhalapada, Sanasuar, Rudrapur, Sahaspur and Sujanpur) of Jajpur block and 10GPs (Atalpur, Samantarapur, Routrapur, Prathamakhandi, Rajendrapur, Arthanga, Mangarajpur, Brahmabarada, Bandhadiha and Maheswarpur) of Rasulpur block.

This constituency was known as Bari-Derabisi from 1974 to 2004.

== Elected members ==
Vote share of winning candidates
2024	63.77%
2019	48.28%
2014	44.44%
2009	51.23%
2004	53.00%
2000	56.52%
1995	45.98%
1990	56.58%
1985	53.35%
1980	55.55%
1977	51.07%

Since its formation in 1974, 12 elections had been held till 2024.

Members elected from Bari constituency are:

Year	Member	Party
As Bari Constituency
2024	Biswa Ranjan Mallick	Biju Janata Dal
2019	Sunanda Das	Biju Janata Dal
2014	Debasis Nayak	Biju Janata Dal
2009	Debasis Nayak	Biju Janata Dal
As Bari-Derabisi Constituency
2004	Debasis Nayak	Biju Janata Dal
2000	Debasis Nayak	Biju Janata Dal
1995	Chinmaya Prasad Behura	Indian National Congress
1990	Kulamani Rout	Janata Dal
1985	Srikant Kumar Jena	Janata Party
1980	Srikant Kumar Jena	Janata Party (Secular)
1977	Srikant Kumar Jena	Janata Party
1974	Prahlad Mallik	Utkal Congress

== Election results ==
=== 2024 ===
Voting were held on 1 June 2024 in 4th phase of Odisha Assembly Election & 7th phase of Indian General Election. Counting of votes was on 4 June 2024. In 2024 election, Biju Janata Dal candidate Biswa Ranjan Mallick defeated Bharatiya Janata Party candidate Umesh Chandra Jena by a margin of 51,465 votes.

2024 Odisha Vidhan Sabha Election, Bari
Party	Candidate	Votes	%	±%
BJD	Biswa Ranjan Mallick	101,966	63.77	▲15.49
BJP	Umesh Chandra Jena	50,501	31.58	▼14.00
INC	Debashish Nayak	4,106	2.57	▼2.14
NOTA	None of the above	569	0.36	▲0.06
Majority		51,465	32.19	
Turnout		1,59,903	70.39	
BJD hold				

=== 2019 ===
In 2019 election, Biju Janata Dal candidate Sunanda Das defeated Bharatiya Janata Party candidate Biswa Ranjan Mallick by a margin of 4,062 votes.

2019 Vidhan Sabha Election, Bari
Party	Candidate	Votes	%	±%
BJD	Sunanda Das	72,559	48.28	
BJP	Biswa Ranjan Mallick	68,497	45.58	
INC	Umesh Chandra Jena	7,082	4.71	
NOTA	None of the above	447	0.30	−
Majority		4062	13.36	2.70
Turnout		1,50,288	70.60	
Registered electors		2,10,354		
BJD hold				

=== 2014 ===
In 2014 election, Biju Janata Dal candidate Debasis Nayak defeated Independent candidate Biswa Ranjan Mallick by a margin of 7,173 votes.

2014 Vidhan Sabha Election, Bari
Party	Candidate	Votes	%	±%
BJD	Debasis Nayak	59,800	44.44	
Independent	Biswa Ranjan Mallick	52,627	39.11	
BJP	Nilamani Samal	9,183	6.82	
INC	Gagan Jena	7,682	5.71	
NOTA	None of the above	807	0.6	−
Majority		7173	13.36	3.47
Turnout		1,34,561	71.09	12.22
Registered electors		1,89,271		
BJD hold				

=== 2009 ===
In 2009 election, Biju Janata Dal candidate Debasis Nayak defeated Indian National Congress candidate Naba Kishore Samal by a margin of 11,767 votes.

2009 Vidhan Sabha Election, Bari
Party	Candidate	Votes	%	±%
BJD	Debasis Nayak	55,842	51.23	−
INC	Naba Kishore Samal	44,075	40.43	−
BJP	Jagannath Prasad Samal	6,888	6.32	−
Majority		11,767	10.79 (Note: %of total valid votes)	−
Turnout		1,09,052	58.87	−
BJD hold				
