= Taharpur, Jajpur =

Taharpur
- village
- Location in Orissa, India
- Coordinates: 21.10607°N 85.99279°E
- Country: India
- State: Odisha
- District: Jajpur

Government
  - Body: Taharpur Panchayat

Population
  - Total: 1,200

Languages
  - Official: Oriya
- Time zone: UTC+5:30 (IST)
- PIN: 755019
- Telephone code: 06726 (STD Code)
- Vehicle registration: OR-
- Nearest city: Jajpur Keonjhar Road
- Lok Sabha constituency: Jajpur
- Civic agency: Taharpur Panchayat

Taharpur is a village in Jajpur district of Orissa, India.

It is a very old village with a cultural and religious history. A very Old Krishna temple is at the centre of the Village and God Krishna is worshiped there. The villagers celebrate many festivals like Dola Purnima, Holi, Jhulana Yatra, Chandan Purnima, Janmasthami, and Radhasthami in the Krishna temple known as "Shriman Gopaljew Temple". "Chabisha Prahari" is the biggest festival of the village which is celebrated for five days in the Oriya month of Phalguna with great devotion. The village culture is mainly based on Bhaishnav thoughts and the villagers worship Shri Chaitanya as an incarnation of both Sri Krishna and Radha. The great devotee of Shri Chaitanya, Sriman Radha Raman of Nadia had visited the village in 1900.

Long ago a forest was present beside the village which is now limited to few acres only. Deforestation and no further plantation is the main cause for the ruin of the green land.

The villagers mainly depend on agriculture as income source.

Education facilities are not up to the mark in the village. Only a few students have achieved the higher qualification and placed in professional jobs.
