= Mahavinayak Temple =

Hindu Temple

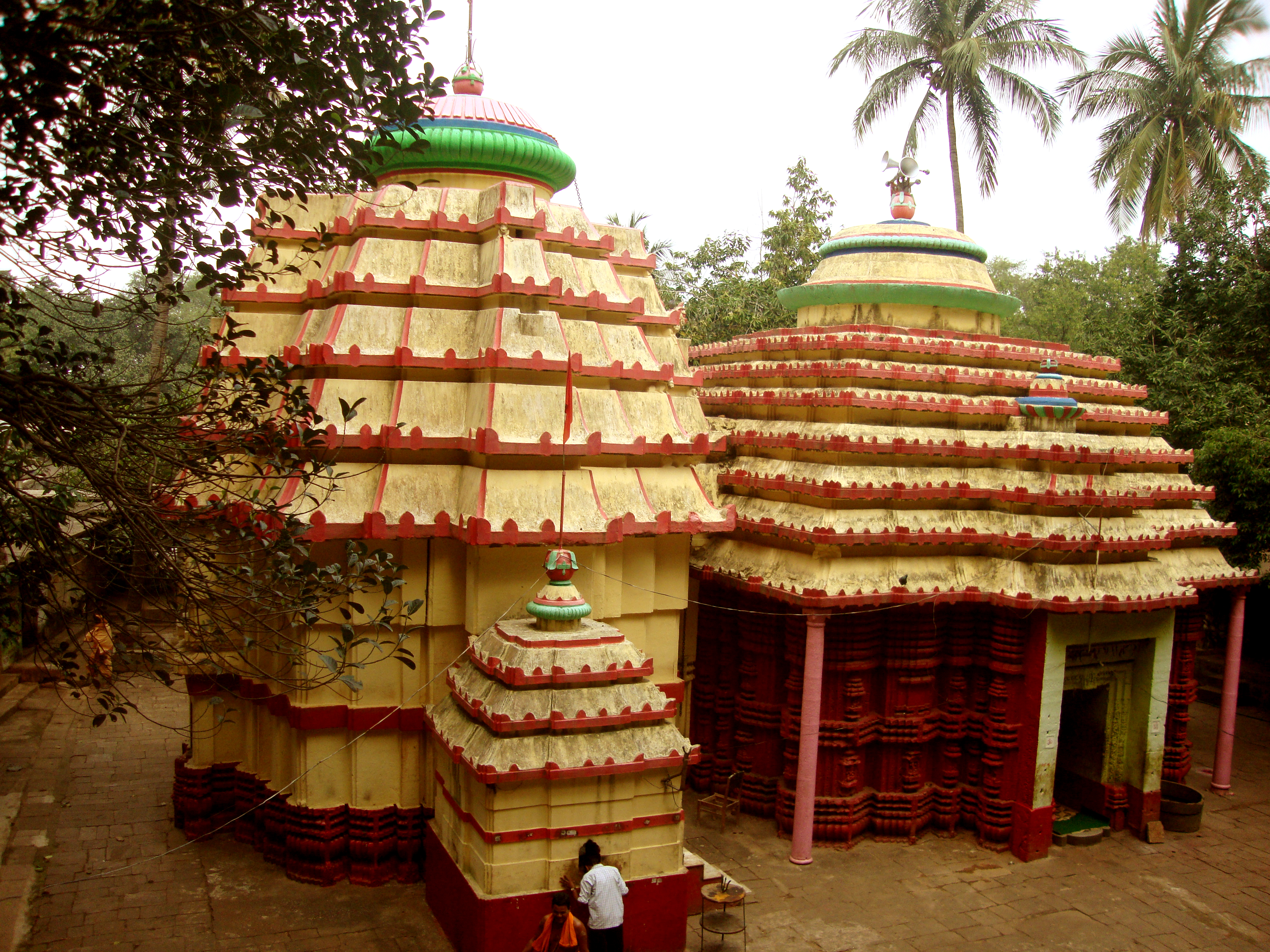
- Mahavinayak temple

- Location within Odisha

Religion
- Affiliation: Hinduism
- District: Jajpur
- Deity: Shiva, Vishnu, Durga, Sun and Ganesha
- Festivals: Shiva Ratri, Makar Sankranti, Raja

Location
- Location: Chandikhole, Odisha
- State: Odisha
- Country: India
- Interactive map of Mahavinayak Temple
- Coordinates: 20.705416°N 86.086201°E

Architecture
- Type: Kalinga architecture
- Established: 12th Century

Mahavinayak Temple is a major pilgrimage center in Chandikhole in Jajpur district in the Indian state of Odisha. It is one of the oldest Ganesha temples in the state. Five gods - Shiva, Vishnu, Durga, Surya and Ganesha - are worshiped as one deity in a single Garbhagriha or sanctum sanctorum there.

== Multiple deities ==
Because five gods are worshiped as one deity in the temple, there is no pahada in there. Normally, Hindu temples close after pahada, which is sleeping time for the gods. Since Shiva and Vishnu are worshiped in a single sanctum sanctorum, leaves of both Bilva (Aegle marmelos) and Tulasi (Holy Basil) are used in prasadam.

Anna (rice) prasadam is offered instead of Batula Bhoga.

== Location ==
The Mahavinayak Temple is located in Chandikhole in Jajpur district.

The first adjoining foothill base hosts the temple of Goddess Chandi, and in the second foothill base is the temple of Mahavinayak. Both have perennial springs (Golden Spring) with pucca swimming ponds for bathing. In the middle of the hill, just above the Mahavinayak Temple, is another temple dedicated to Maa Banadurga.

== Legends ==
The Mahavinayak Temple is a place of mythological and historical importance. This temple was constructed by the kings of the Keshari Dynasty of Odisha during the 12th century.

The goddess Rati, the wife of Kamadeva, is worshiped there for her devotion that led to the release of her husband from the curse of the god Shiva. While she was praying to Ganesha, five hands simultaneously stretched out toward her to receive her offering, putting her in a dilemma. She then prayed to Bramha who clarified that the five gods, Ganesh, Sun, Vishnu, Shiva and Durga, were pleased with her prayer and simultaneously stretched their hands to receive her offering. Kamadeva was released thereafter, and that day a large granite stone emerged from the earth, containing the divine power of the five gods.

This place is also related to Mahabharat legends. The Baruna hill area was the capital of Yudhisthira. From this place, he left for heaven by handing the royal charges of his empire to a teli (an oilman whom he saw first before dawn) who later became the king. His palace was named Teligarh and the remains of his palace can still be seen on the opposite side of the temple. During the Mahabharat battle, mother Kunti also offered Golden Champa flower to Lord Shiva from this place for the victory of her sons.

It is also said that the detached head of Lord Ganesh fell at this location.

== Festivals ==
Festivals, such as Shiva Ratri, Makar Sankranti and Raja, are celebrated here. Shiva Ratri is celebrated for five days with Yagna and Homa every year. People visit each Monday. In the month of Shravana, Shiva devotees offer holy river water to fulfill their wishes.

== Tourism ==
This temple plays a role in Odisha tourism, particularly attracting worshipers of Shiva. It is a picnic spot for trekkers and religious pilgrims, with its densely wooded hills. Chandi temple can be reached via a forest route from Mahavinayak Temple. Its natural environment attracts tourists during winter and summer season.

Lodging and temple boarding facilities are available for pilgrims to use. These facilities are maintained by the Endowment Commissioner of Odisha with one Trustee board.
