= Sunanda Das =

Politician from Odisha, India

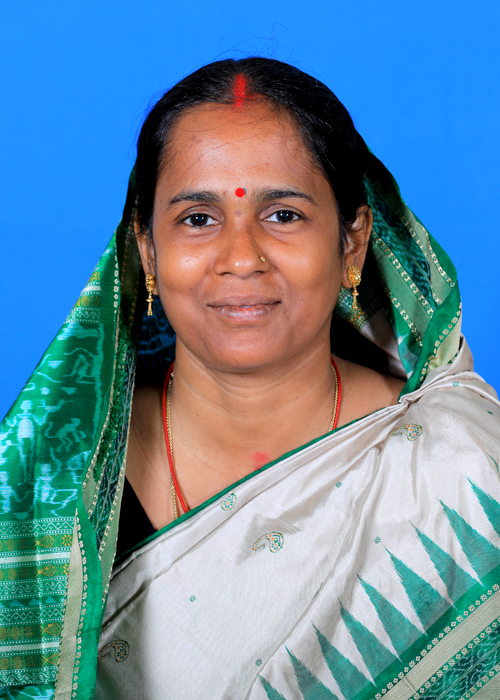

Member of Odisha Legislative Assembly
- Incumbent
- Assumed office April 2019
- Preceded by: Debasish Nayak
- Constituency: Bari

Personal details
- Born: Sunanda Das; February 2, 1974 (age 52) Jajpur District, Odisha, India
- Party: Biju Janata Dal
- Spouse: Debendra Kumar Das
- Children: 2
- Parent: Late. Keshab Chandra Das (father)
- Profession: Politician, Social Worker

Sunanda Das is a Politician in Odisha. She has been the Member of Legislative Assembly for Bari, Odisha since 2019.

== Early life ==
Sunanda Das was born to Keshab Chandra Das in a Gopal family. She did her schooling at Krupasindhu Bidyabhaban, Rampa village, Bari, Jajpur district.

== Political career ==
Sunanda Das has become the first woman to be elected as MLA from Bari Assembly constituency in Jajpur district. She is a former BJP block chairperson and also the fourth woman in the Jajpur district to be elected as a legislator. Sunanda joined the BJD a couple of days before elections. She was in the news for joining the BJD in the morning and getting the party ticket to contest from Bari Assembly seat in the evening.

Sunanda had replaced Debasish Nayak, who was elected from Bari Assembly segment four times in a row since 2000. She had to face resentment of the BJD workers in the area when she was nominated from Bari instead of Nayak. Sources said some BJD workers also tried to ensure Sunanda’s defeat from the constituency. The legislator’s nomination was opposed by former Bari block BJD president and an aide of Nayak, Sheikh Safiuddin, and his supporters. The situation turned worse to the extent that Saifuddin was suspended from BJD shortly after the elections were over.

Sunanda was pitted against Biswa Ranjan Mallick of the BJP, who was instrumental in getting her elected as block chairperson in 2017. Mallick was defeated by 4,062 votes. While Sunanda received 72,559 votes, the BJP candidate polled 68,497 votes. Congress candidate Umesh Chandra Jena bagged 4,062 votes.
