= Chhatia Bata =

Hindu temple in Odisha, India

Coordinates: 20.8500°N 86.3333°E

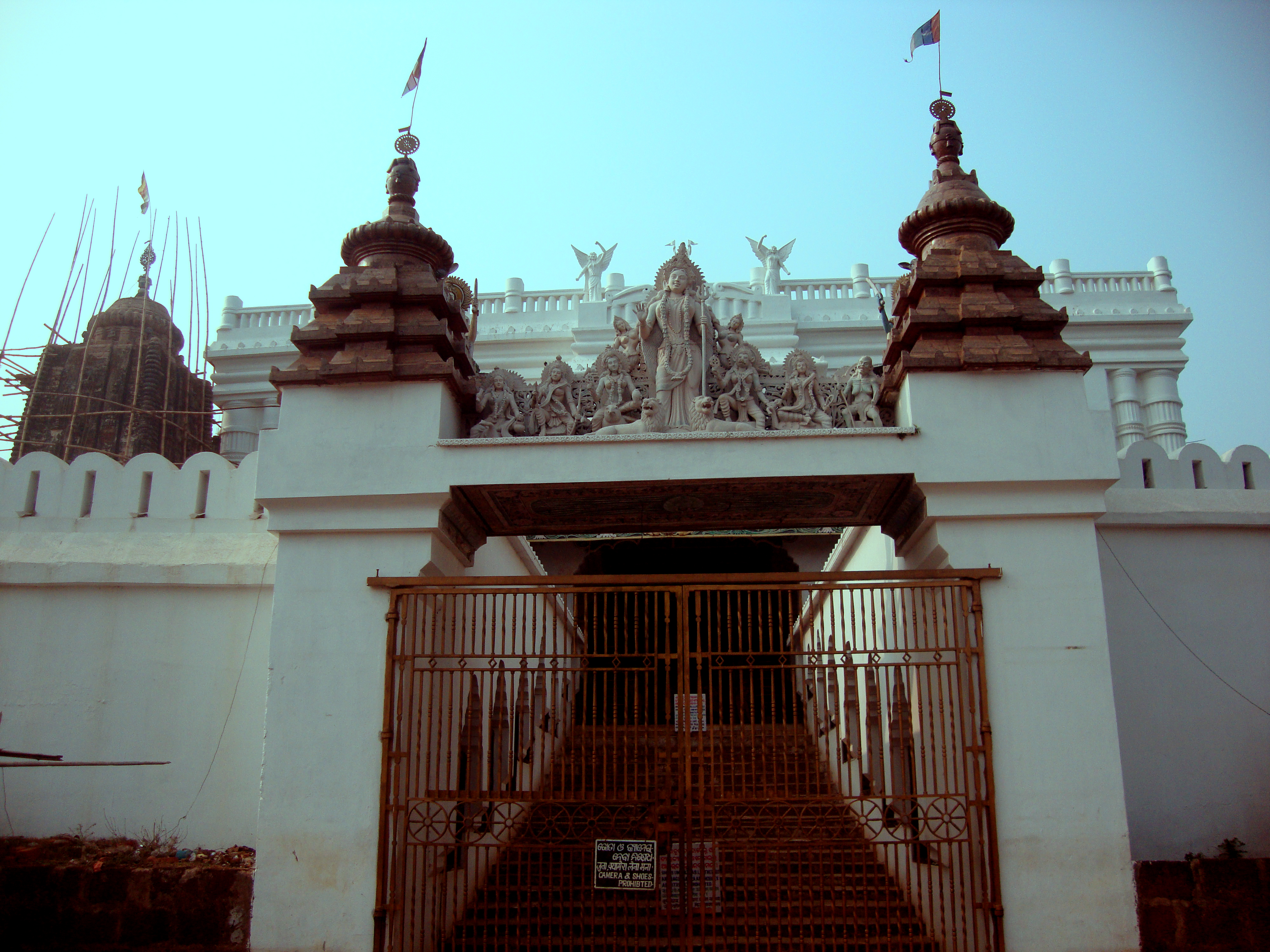
Chhatia temple

Chhatia Bata Dhama or Chhatia Jagannath Temple is a Hindu temple in the village of Chhatia in the Jajpur district, between the towns of Cuttack and Jajpur in Odisha, in eastern India. It is devoted to Jagannath and associated with Kalki, the avatar of Vishnu.

Hadidas mentions this temple in the saga Maalika, predicting that "on a day when all living animals and humans will die and fish will play at the steps of Puri temple".

== See also ==
- List of Jagannath Temples outside Puri
