= Dharmasala Assembly constituency =

Constituency of the Odisha legislative assembly in India

Coordinates: 20.77°N 86.15°E

Dharmasala
- Constituency No. 51 for the Odisha Legislative Assembly

Constituency details
- Country: India
- Region: East India
- State: Odisha
- Division: Central Division
- District: Jajpur
- Lok Sabha constituency: Jajpur
- Established: 1951
- Total electors: 2,32,166 (Note: as on 2024) (Note: as data published by election commission)
- Reservation: None

Member of Legislative Assembly
- 17th Odisha Legislative Assembly
- Incumbent Himanshu Sekhar Sahoo
- Party: Independent
- Elected year: 2024

Dharmasala is a Vidhan Sabha constituency of Jajpur district, Odisha, India.

The area of this constituency includes Dharmasala block and 9 GPs (Odiso, Kalana, Singhpur, Sribantapur, Jabara, Nathuabar, Rahamba, Barabati and Rasulpur) of Rasulpur block.

== Elected members ==
Vote share of winning candidates
2024	42.88%
2019	58.61%
2014	68.6%
2009	58.25%
2004	56.65%
2000	47.82%
1995	48.91%
1990	59.48%
1985	48.59%
1980	28.68%
1977	53.18%

Since its formation in 1951, 18 elections were held till date. Dharmasala was a 2-member constituency for 1957.

List of members elected from Dharmasala constituency are:

Year	Member	Party
2024	Himanshu Sekhar Sahoo	Independent politician
2019	Pranab Kumar Balabantaray	Biju Janata Dal
2014	Pranab Kumar Balabantaray	Biju Janata Dal
2009	Kalpataru Das	Biju Janata Dal
2004	Kalpataru Das	Biju Janata Dal
2000	Kalpataru Das	Biju Janata Dal
1995	Kalpataru Das	Janata Dal
1990	Gurucharan Tikayat	Janata Dal
1985	Kangali Charan Panda	Indian National Congress
1980	Kangali Charan Panda	Indian National Congress (I)
1977	Rabi Dash	Janata Party
1974	Banka Behari Das	Indian National Congress
1971	Banka Behari Das	Praja Socialist Party
1967	Paramananda Mohanty	Praja Socialist Party
1961	Gadadhar Dutta	Indian National Congress
1957 (Note: It was a 2 member constituency)	Mayadhar Singh	Indian National Congress
1957	Madan Mohan Patnaik	Indian National Congress
1951	Paramananda Mohanty	Socialist Party

== Election results ==
=== 2024 ===
Voting were held on 1 June 2024 in 4th phase of Odisha Assembly Election & 7th phase of Indian General Election. Counting of votes was on 4 June 2024. In 2024 election, Independent candidate Himanshu Sekhar Sahoo defeated Biju Janata Dal candidate Pranab Kumar Balabantaray by a margin of 4,150 votes.

2024 Vidhan Sabha Election, Dharmasala
Party	Candidate	Votes	%	±%
Independent	Himanshu Sekhar Sahoo	79,759	42.88	▲42.88
BJD	Pranab Kumar Balabantaray	75,609	40.65	▼17.96
BJP	Smruti Rekha Pahi	15,926	8.56	▼19.56
SUCI(C)	Kedaranath Sahu	8,453	4.54	N/A
INC	Kisan Panda	2,947	1.58	▼9.17
NOTA	None of the above	666	0.36	▼0.07
Majority		4,150	2.23	▼28.26
Turnout		1,86,013	80.12	
Independent gain from BJD				

=== 2019 ===
In 2019 election, Biju Janata Dal candidate Pranab Kumar Balabantaray defeated Bharatiya Janata Party candidate Ramesh Chandra Parida by a margin of 52,739 votes.

2019 Odisha Legislative Assembly election: Dharmasala
Party	Candidate	Votes	%	±%
BJD	Pranab Kumar Balabantaray	101,364	58.61	
BJP	Ramesh Chandra Parida	48,625	28.12	
INC	Smruti Rekha Pahi	18,588	10.75	
None of the Above	None of the Above	736	0.43	
Majority		52,739	30.49	
Turnout		172935	77.16	
BJD hold				

=== 2014 ===
In 2014 election, Biju Janata Dal candidate Pranab Kumar Balabantaray defeated Indian National Congress candidate Srinath Mishra by a margin of 85,786 votes.

2014 Vidhan Sabha Election, Dharmasala
Party	Candidate	Votes	%	±%
BJD	Pranab Kumar Balabantaray	109,241	68.6	10.35
INC	Srinath Mishra	23,455	14.73	17.9
BJP	Ramesh Chandra Parida	19,940	12.52	8.62
NOTA	None of the above	1,185	0.74	−
Majority		85,786	53.87	28.24
Turnout		1,59,251	82.25	8.16
Registered electors		1,93,608		
BJD hold				

=== 2009 ===
In 2009 election, Biju Janata Dal candidate Kalpataru Das defeated Indian National Congress candidate Kangali Charan Panda by a margin of 35,133 votes.

2009 Vidhan Sabha Election, Dharmasala
Party	Candidate	Votes	%	±%
BJD	Kalpataru Das	79,867	58.25	−
INC	Kangali Charan Panda	44,734	32.63	−
BJP	Ramesh Chandra Parida	5,341	3.90	−
Majority		35,133	25.63 (Note: %of total valid votes)	−
Turnout		1,37,126	74.09	−
BJD hold				
