= Sarmistha Sethi =

Politician from Odisha, India

Member of Parliament, Lok Sabha
- In office 23 May 2019 – 4 June 2024
- Preceded by: Rita Tarai
- Succeeded by: Rabindra Narayan Behera
- Constituency: Jajpur

Personal details
- Born: 4 February 1974 (age 52) Ranihat [Cuttack]], Odisha
- Party: Biju Janata Dal
- Spouse: Rabindra kumar Sethy
- Children: 1 Son
- Parent(s): Madan Mohan Sethi, Urmila Sethi
- Profession: Politician

Sarmistha Sethi is an Indian politician. She was elected to the Lok Sabha, lower house of the Parliament of India from Jajpur, Odisha in the 2019 Indian general election as a member of the Biju Janata Dal.
