= Binjharpur Assembly constituency =

Constituency of the Odisha legislative assembly in India

Coordinates: 20.73°N 86.40°E

Binjharpur
- Constituency No. 48 for the Odisha Legislative Assembly

Constituency details
- Country: India
- Region: East India
- State: Odisha
- Division: Central Division
- District: Jajpur
- Lok Sabha constituency: Jajpur
- Established: 1951
- Total electors: 2,29,680 (Note: as on 2024) (Note: as data published by election commission)
- Reservation: SC

Member of Legislative Assembly
- 17th Odisha Legislative Assembly
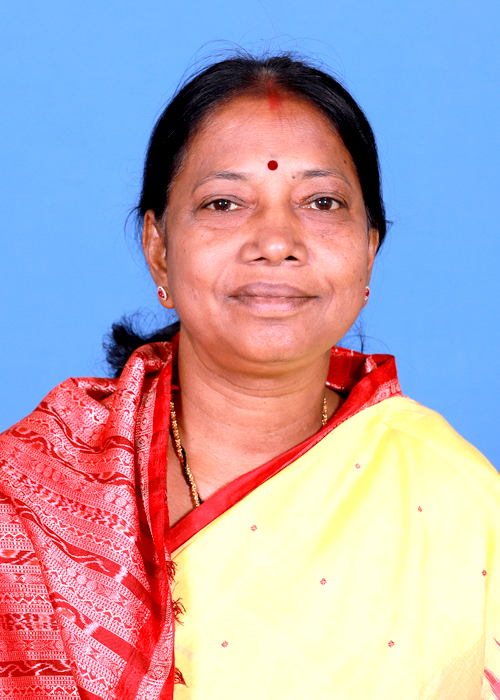
- Incumbent Pramila Mallik
- Party: Biju Janata Dal
- Elected year: 2024

Binjharpur is a Vidhan Sabha constituency of Jajpur district, Odisha.

The area of this state legislature constituency includes Binjharpur block and 12 GPs (Biripata, Asanpur, Palatpur, Khannagar, Kamardihi, Nizampur, Duttapur, Bihari, Gramnandipur, Thalkudi, Kayan and Chasakhanda) of Dasarathpur block.

== Elected members ==
Vote share of winning candidates
| 2024 | 48.84% |
| 2019 | 55.18% |
| 2014 | 57.4% |
| 2009 | 43.57% |
| 2004 | 55.44% |
| 2000 | 51.48% |
| 1995 | 41.98% |
| 1990 | 38.99% |
| 1985 | 45.06% |
| 1980 | 47.81% |
| 1977 | 53.78% |

Since its formation in 1951, 17 elections had been held till 2024. It was a 2-member constituency until 1952.

List of members elected from Binjharpur constituency are:

| Year | Member | Party |
|---|---|---|
| 2024 | Pramila Mallik | Biju Janata Dal |
| 2019 | Pramila Mallik | Biju Janata Dal |
| 2014 | Pramila Mallik | Biju Janata Dal |
| 2009 | Pramila Mallik | Biju Janata Dal |
| 2004 | Pramila Mallik | Biju Janata Dal |
| 2000 | Pramila Mallik | Biju Janata Dal |
| 1995 | Arjun Das | Indian National Congress |
| 1990 | Pramila Mallik | Janata Dal |
| 1985 | Naba Kishore Mallick | Indian National Congress |
| 1980 | Naba Kishore Mallick | Indian National Congress (I) |
| 1977 | Santanu Kumar Das | Janata Party |
| 1974 | Baishnab Charan Mallick | Indian National Congress |
| 1971 | Pabitra Mohan Jena | Indian National Congress (R) |
| 1967 | Baishnab Charan Mallick | Praja Socialist Party |
| 1961 | Chittaranjan Naik | Indian National Congress |
| 1957 | Banka Behari Das | Praja Socialist Party |
| 1951 (Note: It was a 2 member constituency) | Naba Kishore Mallick | Indian National Congress |
| 1951 | Padmanava Roy | Indian National Congress |

== Election Results ==
=== 2024 ===
Voting were held on 1 June 2024 in 4th phase of Odisha Assembly Election & 7th phase of Indian General Election. Counting of votes was on 4 June 2024. In 2024 election, Biju Janata Dal candidate Pramila Mallik defeated Bharatiya Janata Party candidate Babita Mallick by a margin of 2,856 votes.

2024 Odisha Vidhan Sabha Election, Binjharpur
| Party | Candidate | Votes | % | ±% |
|---|---|---|---|---|
| BJD | Pramila Mallik | 74,185 | 48.84 | ▼6.34 |
| BJP | Babita Mallick | 71,329 | 46.96 | ▲6.59 |
| INC | Kanaklata Mallick | 4,392 | 2.89 | ▲0.02 |
| NOTA | None of the above | 947 | 0.62 | ▼0.01 |
| Majority | | 2,856 | 1.8 | |
| Turnout | | 1,51,907 | 66.14 | |
| BJD hold | | | | |

=== 2019 ===
In 2019 election, Biju Janata Dal candidate Pramila Mallik defeated Bharatiya Janata Party candidate Babita Mallick by a margin of 11,226 votes.

2019 Vidhan Sabha Election, Binjharpur
| Party | Candidate | Votes | % | ±% |
|---|---|---|---|---|
| BJD | Pramila Mallik | 79,087 | 55.18 | ▼2.22 |
| BJP | Babita Mallick | 57,861 | 40.37 | ▲28.54 |
| INC | Manoranjan Das | 3,997 | 2.79 | ▼25.2 |
| NOTA | None of the above | 906 | 0.63 | |
| Majority | | 11,226 | 13.71 | |
| Turnout | | 1,43,319 | 67 | |
| BJD hold | | | | |

=== 2014 ===
In 2014 election, Biju Janata Dal candidate Pramila Mallik defeated Indian National Congress candidate Babita Mallick by a margin of 38,190 votes.

2014 Vidhan Sabha Election, Binjharpur
| Party | Candidate | Votes | % | ±% |
|---|---|---|---|---|
| BJD | Pramila Mallik | 74,532 | 57.4 | ▼3.65 |
| INC | Babita Mallick | 36,342 | 27.99 | ▼3.81 |
| BJP | Deba Prasad Mallik | 15,358 | 11.83 | ▲10.01 |
| NOTA | None of the above | 1,085 | 0.84 | − |
| Majority | | 38,190 | 29.40 | 0.15 |
| Turnout | | 1,29,857 | 68.38 | 7.87 |
| Registered electors | | 1,89,901 | | |
| BJD hold | | | | |

=== 2009 ===
In 2009 election, Biju Janata Dal candidate Pramila Mallik defeated Indian National Congress candidate Babita Mallick by a margin of 31,861 votes.

2009 Vidhan Sabha Election, Binjharpur
| Party | Candidate | Votes | % | ±% |
|---|---|---|---|---|
| BJD | Pramila Mallik | 66,507 | 61.05 | − |
| INC | Babita Mallick | 34,646 | 31.80 | − |
| BJP | Manas Ranjan Mallick | 4,159 | 3.82 | − |
| Majority | | 31,861 | 29.25 (Note: %of total valid votes) | − |
| Turnout | | 1,08,979 | 60.51 | − |
| BJD hold | | | | |
