= Rasulpur tehsil =

Coordinates: 20.831°N 86.192°E

Rasulpur Tahsil is one of the thirteen blocks of the Jajpur district in Odisha state, India. National Highway 5 passes through the block.
