= Mohan Jena =

Indian politician (1957–2022)

Member of Lok Sabha
- In office 2004–2014
- Preceded by: Jagannath Mallick
- Succeeded by: Rita Tarai
- Constituency: Jajpur

Personal details
- Born: 14 July 1957 Jajpur, Odisha, India
- Died: 12 December 2022 (aged 65)
- Party: Bharatiya Janata Party
- Other political affiliations: Biju Janata Dal
- Spouse: Harapriya Panigrahi
- Children: 1 Daughter
- As of 22 September, 2006

Mohan Jena (14 July 1957 – 12 December 2022) was an Indian politician who was a member of the 14th Lok Sabha. He represented the Jajpur Constituency of Odisha and was a member of the Biju Janata Dal political party. In March 2019, he joined Bharatiya Janata Party in the presence of Dharmendra Pradhan and Arun Singh.

Jena died on 12 December 2022, at the age of 65.

== See also ==
- Jajpur (Lok Sabha constituency)
- Indian general election in Orissa, 2009
- Biju Janata Dal
