= Kacharasahi =

Coordinates: 20°16′N 85°13′E

Kacharasahi is a village in Jajpur district in the Indian state of Odisha.
