= Garagali =

Coordinates: 20.655°N 86.181°E

Garagali, or Gargali, is a small village in Jajpur district, Odisha state, India. It is governed locally as a part of Kundal town.

== Demographics ==
The 2001 census recorded a population of 1073, and the 2011 census recorded a population of 1066. The postal index code is 754296.

== Amenities ==
The village has two schools: Garagali UGME School and Malihasuni Bidyapitha Garagali High School, which is named after village goddess Maa Malihasuni. The hamlet also has a Brundaban Chandra temple, Maa Durga Mandap, where Durga Puja is celebrated annually.There is Mela Bata (annual Nama jajnya is Celebrated) Maa Mallyasuni temple-famous western faced deity is worshipped by the Hindus, annual function on Rahas Purnima and saptasati chandi jajnya with Basanti Durga puja held in the month of Chaitra. Village prominent Hindu deity is Sri Gopinath Jew.
