= Rita Tarai =

Indian politician

Member: 16th Lok Sabha
- In office 2014–2019
- Preceded by: Mohan Jena
- Succeeded by: Sarmistha Sethi
- Constituency: Jajpur

Personal details
- Party: Biju Janata Dal
- Profession: Politician

Rita Tarai is an Indian politician. She is elected to the 16th Lok Sabha in 2014 from Jajpur constituency in Odisha. She is a member of the Biju Janata Dal (BJD) political party.

== See also ==
- Indian general election, 2014 (Odisha)
