= Barchana Assembly constituency =

Constituency of the Odisha legislative assembly in India

Coordinates: 20.67°N 86.12°E

Barchana
- Constituency No. 50 for the Odisha Legislative Assembly

Constituency details
- Country: India
- Region: East India
- State: Odisha
- Division: Central Division
- District: Jajpur
- Lok Sabha constituency: Jajpur
- Established: 1951
- Total electors: 1,94,341 (Note: as on 2024) (Note: as data published by election commission)
- Reservation: None

Member of Legislative Assembly
- 17th Odisha Legislative Assembly
- Incumbent Amar Kumar Nayak
- Party: Bharatiya Janata Party
- Elected year: 2024

Barchana or Badchana is a Vidhan Sabha constituency of Jajpur district, in the Indian state of Odisha.

The area of this constituency includes Barachana block.

== Elected members ==
Vote share of winning candidates
2024	49.38%
2019	46.64%
2014	42.07%
2009	40.38%
2004	50.79%
2000	51.07%
1995	48.36%
1990	55.53%
1985	60.33%
1980	54.94%
1977	43.7%

Since its formation in 1951, 17 elections were held till date.

List of members elected from Barachana constituency are:

Year	Member	Party
2024	Amar Kumar Nayak	Bharatiya Janata Party
2019	Amar Prasad Satapathy	Biju Janata Dal
2014	Amar Prasad Satapathy	Biju Janata Dal
2009	Amar Prasad Satapathy	Nationalist Congress Party
2004	Sitakanta Mohapatra	Indian National Congress
2000	Amar Prasad Satpathy	Biju Janata Dal
1995	Amar Prasad Satpathy	Janata Dal
1990	Amar Prasad Satpathy	Janata Dal
1985	Sitakanta Mohapatra	Indian National Congress
1980	Sitakanta Mohapatra	Indian National Congress (I)
1977	Managobinda Samal	Janata Party
1974	Dusasan Jena	Communist Party of India
1971	Managobinda Samal	Utkal Congress
1967	Jagannath Das	Praja Socialist Party
1961	Dhananjoy Lenka	Indian National Congress
1957	Jadumani Mangaraj	Indian National Congress
1951	Nabakrushna Choudhuri	Indian National Congress

== Election results ==
=== 2024 ===
Voting were held on 1 June 2024 in 4th phase of Odisha Assembly Election & 7th phase of Indian General Election. Counting of votes was on 4 June 2024. In 2024 election, Bharatiya Janata Party candidate Amar Kumar Nayak defeated Biju Janata Dal candidate Varsha Priyadarshini by a margin of 6,310 votes.

2024 Odisha Legislative Assembly election: Barchana
Party	Candidate	Votes	%	±%
BJP	Amar Kumar Nayak	71,926	49.38	▲3.83
BJD	Varsha Priyadarshini	65,616	45.05	▼1.59
INC	Ajay Samal	6,627	4.55	▼2.23
NOTA	None of the above	409	0.28	▼0.07
Majority		6,310	4.33	▲3.24
Turnout		1,45,667	74.95	
BJP gain from BJD				

=== 2019 ===
In 2019 election, Biju Janata Dal candidate Amar Prasad Satapathy defeated Bharatiya Janata Party candidate Amar Kumar Nayak by a margin of 1485 votes.

2019 Vidhan Sabha Election, Barchana
Party	Candidate	Votes	%	±%
BJD	Amar Prasad Satpathy	64,084	46.64	
BJP	Amar Kumar Nayak	62,599	45.55	
INC	Ajay Kumar Samal	9,322	6.78	
NOTA	None of the above	475	0.35	
Majority		1,485	1.09	
Turnout		1,37,415	74.7	
Registered electors		1,81,507		
BJD hold				

=== 2014 ===
In 2014 election, Biju Janata Dal candidate Amar Prasad Satapathy defeated Indian National Congress candidate Janmejoy Lenka by a margin of 16,939 votes.

2014 Vidhan Sabha Election, Barchana
Party	Candidate	Votes	%	±%
BJD	Amar Prasad Satpathy	53,322	42.07	
INC	Janmejoy Lenka	36,383	28.7	−1.79
Independent	Amar Kumar Nayak	26,260	20.72	
Independent	Rajnarayan Mohapatra	5,048	3.98	
BJP	Simantini Jena	3,564	2.81	0.36
NOTA	None of the above	567	0.45	−
Majority		16,939	13.36	3.47
Turnout		1,26,760	77.48	10.66
Registered electors		1,63,603		
BJD gain from NCP				

=== 2009 ===
In 2009 election, Nationalist Congress Party candidate Amar Prasad Satapathy defeated Indian National Congress candidate Sitakanta Mohapatra by a margin of 10,649 votes.

2009 Vidhan Sabha Election, Barachana
Party	Candidate	Votes	%	±%
NCP	Amar Prasad Satapathy	43,473	40.38	−
INC	Sitakanta Mohapatra	32,824	30.49	−
Independent	Janmejoy Lenka	25,409	23.60	−
BJP	Pabitra Mohan Samantaray	2,633	2.45	−
Majority		10,649	9.89 (Note: %of total valid votes)	−
Turnout		1,07,708	66.82	−
NCP gain from INC				
