= Biswa Ranjan Mallick =

Indian politician

Member of Odisha Legislative Assembly
- Incumbent
- Assumed office 4 June 2024
- Preceded by: Sunanda Das
- Constituency: Bari

Personal details
- Party: Biju Janata Dal
- Profession: Politician

Biswa Ranjan Mallick is an Indian politician who was elected to the Odisha Legislative Assembly from Bari as a member of the Biju Janata Dal.
