= Anadi Charan Das =

Indian politician (1935–2023)

MP
- In office 1971–1977 1980–1996
- Constituency: Jajpur

Personal details
- Born: 4 January 1935 Bijipur, Cuttack, Bihar and Orissa Province, British India
- Died: 16 June 2023 (aged 88) Bhubaneswar, Odisha, India
- Party: Indian National Congress
- Other political affiliations: Janata Dal
- Spouse: Netramani Das
- Children: 4 sons and 1 daughter

Anadi Charan Das (4 January 1935 – 16 June 2023) was an Indian politician. He was elected to the Lok Sabha, the lower house of the Parliament of India from the Jajpur constituency of Odisha in 1971, 1980 and 1984 as a member of the Indian National Congress and in 1989 and 1991 as a member of the Janata Dal but rejoined the Indian National Congress in controversial circumstances which helped save Narasimha Rao Government on 28 July 1993 no confidence vote along with a group led by Ram Lakhan Singh Yadav.

Das died on 16 June 2023, at the age of 88.
