= Chandikhole =

Chandikhole ଚଣ୍ଡିଖୋଲ Chandikhol
- Town
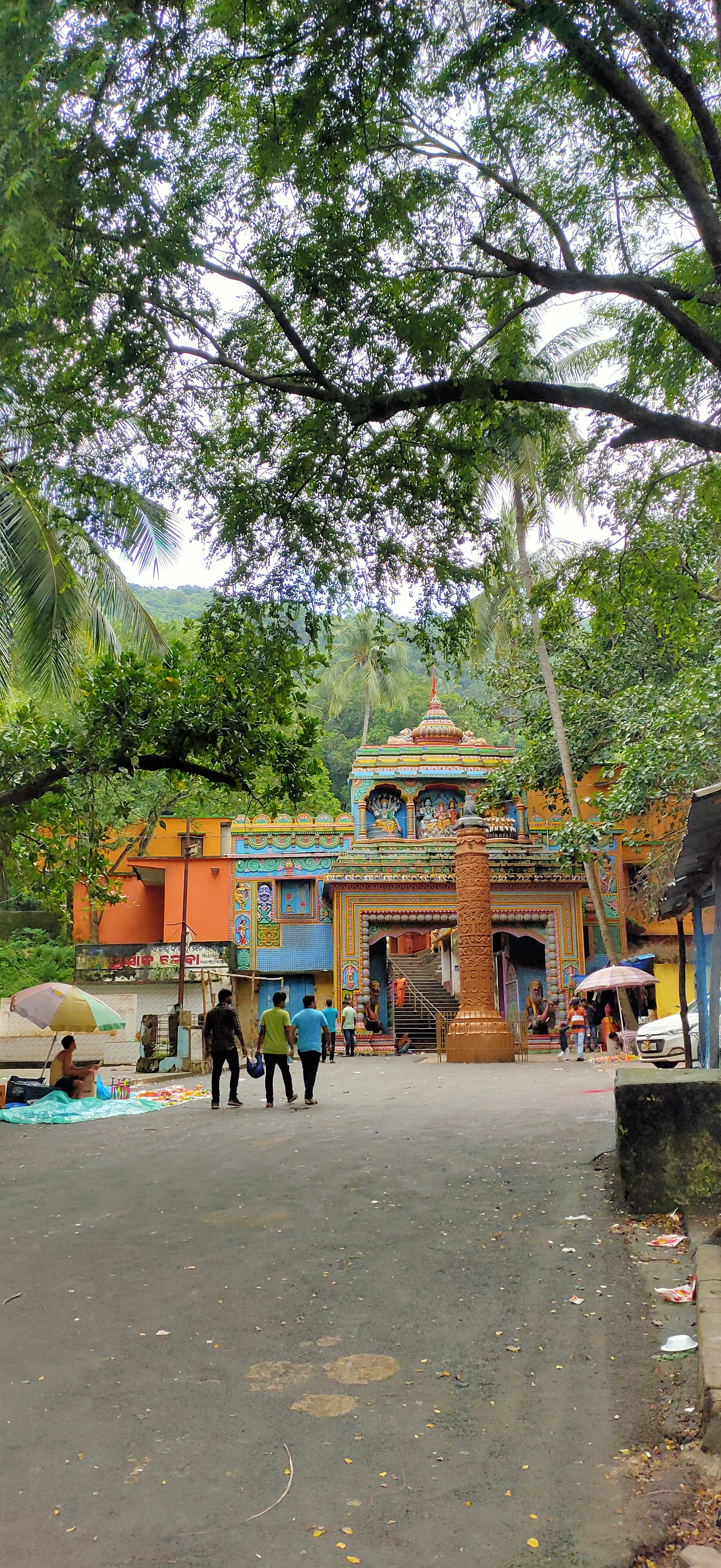
- Mahavinayak Temple near Chandikhole

- Location of Chandikhole in Odisha, India Chandikhole (India)
- Coordinates: 20°41′58″N 86°8′2″E
- Country: India
- State: Odisha
- District: Jajpur
- Block: Dharmashala
- Established: 1932
- Founder: Baba Bhairabananda Bramhachari
- Named for: Goddess Chandi

Government
  - Type: NAC
  - Body: Chandikhol NAC

Area
  - Total: 45.69 km^{2} (17.64 sq mi)

Population (2026 delimitation)
  - Total: 27,002
  - Density: 591.0/km^{2} (1,531/sq mi)

Languages
  - Official: Odia
- Time zone: UTC+5:30 (IST)
- PIN: 755044
- Vehicle registration: OD-04
- Nearest city: Jajpur
- Website: jajapur.nic.in

Chandikhol (or Chandikhole) is a town and a Notified Area Council in the Jajpur district of Odisha, India. The place has been named after Goddess "Chandi" worshipped by late monk Baba Bhairabananda Bramhachari who established the deity of Maa Chandi in one of the adjoining hills of Barunei full of dense forest and ferocious animals in 1932.

Chandikhol serves as a crucial administrative and transport hub for the region, having its own Regional Transport Office (RTO) with the vehicle registration code OD-04. Furthermore, Chandikhol has been selected for the establishment of one of the Strategic Petroleum Reserve (India) locations to bolster the country's energy security.

== Etymology ==
The toponym Chandikhol is derived from the presiding Hindu deity of the region, Goddess Chandi (a fierce manifestation of Shakti or Durga). The suffix khol locally translates to a valley or a gorge surrounded by hills, denoting the geographical location of the original temple settlement. The area was officially named after the deity following the establishment of the Maa Chandi temple in 1932 by the ascetic monk Baba Bhairabananda Bramhachari.

== History ==
While the modern settlement of Chandikhole took shape in the early 20th century, the immediate geographical area has deep historical and mythological significance. The surrounding hills, particularly the Barunei and Mahavinayak ranges, feature in the epic Mahabharata. Legends associate the Barunei hills with the capital of Yudhishthira, and local folklore states that it was from this region he left for heaven, transferring his kingdom to an early dynasty.

During the 12th century, the region was under the administration of the Somavamshi (Keshari) dynasty of Odisha, who built the prominent Mahavinayak Temple in the foothills. To the east of Chandikhole lie the extensive ruins of the ancient Buddhist universities of Puspagiri Vihara, active between the 3rd century BCE and the 11th century CE, indicating the area was part of a major religious and trade route linking Kalinga to other parts of the subcontinent.

In 1932, the late monk Baba Bhairabananda Bramhachari cleared parts of the dense, predator-inhabited forests around the Barunei hills to establish the Maa Chandi temple, catalysing the development of the modern town of Chandikhole around the valley.

== Geography ==
Chandikhole is located at 20.70°N 86.13°E on the coastal plains of Odisha, transitioning into the eastern foothills of the Eastern Ghats.

=== Climate and terrain ===
The town features a Tropical savanna climate (Köppen climate classification Aw), experiencing hot, humid summers, a prominent monsoon season characterized by heavy cyclonic rainfall from the Bay of Bengal, and mild, dry winters. The terrain is a mix of flat alluvial plains and densely forested laterite hills, primarily the Barunei and Mahavinayak hillocks, which act as a geographic boundary to the west of the town.

=== Water systems ===
The town sits in the broader deltaic basin of the Brahmani River, which flows to the northeast of the settlement. The adjoining hills feature several perennial natural springs—most notably the Golden Spring located near the Mahavinayak and Chandi temples—which historically provided fresh water to the temple complexes and local inhabitants.

== Administration and politics ==
Chandikhole is administered as a Notified Area Council (NAC) under the Jajpur district administration. Rural peripheries of the town fall under the jurisdiction of the Dharmashala Community Development Block (Panchayat Samiti).

Law and order are maintained by the Chandikhole Police Station, reporting to the Superintendent of Police, Jajpur. The town also hosts its own Regional Transport Office (RTO) serving the southern and western parts of the district, bearing the vehicle registration code OD-04.

Politically, the town is part of the Dharmashala Vidhan Sabha constituency for the Odisha Legislative Assembly and falls under the Jajpur Lok Sabha constituency for representation in the national parliament.

== Economy ==
The economy of Chandikhole is heavily driven by transport, logistics, and retail, owing to its highly strategic location. It serves as a primary junction connecting two major national highways: NH-16 (part of the Golden Quadrilateral connecting Chennai and Kolkata) and NH-53 (connecting Chandikhole to Raipur in Chhattisgarh).

This road network makes the town a logistical gateway for freight movement between the Kalinganagar Industrial Complex (Odisha's steel hub), the mining districts of Kendujhar, the metropolitan center of Kataka, and the heavy-cargo sea port of Paradeep.

To bolster national energy security, the Government of India, through the Indian Strategic Petroleum Reserves Limited (ISPRL), selected Chandikhole as the site for an underground Strategic Petroleum Reserve (SPR). This commercial facility is engineered to store millions of metric tons of crude oil in subterranean rock caverns, injecting substantial central infrastructure investment into the local economy.

== Tourism ==
Chandikhole is a central node for tourism in Jajpur district, combining religious pilgrimage sites with natural landscapes and ancient archaeological ruins.

- Mahavinayak Temple: Located 1.5 km from the town center in the foothills, this 12th-century temple is unique in Hindu theology as five deities—Shiva, Vishnu, Durga, Surya, and Ganesha—are worshipped as a single unified deity in one garbhagriha (sanctum sanctorum).
- Maa Chandi Temple: Situated slightly above the Mahavinayak Temple on the Barunei hill, it is a prominent Shakti shrine dedicated to Goddess Durga and is heavily visited during the Navaratri festival.
- Buddhist Diamond Triangle: Chandikhole serves as the base camp for tourists visiting the major archaeological excavations of ancient Buddhist monasteries at Ratnagiri, Udayagiri, and Lalitgiri (collectively known as the Diamond Triangle), located a short drive to the east.
- Olasuni Hill and Temple: Located nearby, it houses the tomb of the saint Arakhita Das and is famous for the annual Olasuni Gumpha festival.
- Chhatia Bata: A revered shrine dedicated to Lord Jagannath, located along NH-16 towards Kataka.
