= Sujata Sahu (politician) =

Indian politician

Member of Legislative Assembly, Odisha
- Constituency: Jajpur Assembly constituency

Personal details
- Born: 1972 (age 53–54)
- Party: Biju Janata Dal
- Spouse: Gobinda Sahu

Sujata Sahu (born 1972) is an Indian politician from Odisha. She is an MLA from Jajpur Assembly Constituency in Jajpur District. She represents Biju Janata Dal Party. She won the 2024 Odisha Legislative Assembly election.

== Early life and education ==
Sahu hails from Jajpur. Her husband Gobinda Sahu is a farmer. She completed Class 9 in 1983 at Seshadev Basanti High School, Bhubaneswarpur, Jajpur.

== Career ==
Sahu won the 2024 Odisha Legislative Assembly election from Jajpur representing Biju Janata Dal. She polled 86,049 votes and defeated Goutam Ray of Bharatiya Janata Party by a margin of 2,564 votes.
