= Rabindra Narayan Behera =

Member of the Lok Sabha

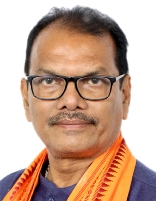
- Official Portrait

Member of Parliament, Lok Sabha
- Incumbent
- Assumed office 4 June 2024
- Preceded by: Sarmistha Sethi
- Constituency: Jaipur, Odisha

Personal details
- Born: 12 March 1963 (age 63) Hatasahi, Odisha
- Party: Bharatiya Janata Party
- Spouse: Dr Sharmila Behera
- Parent(s): Harekrushna Behera, Saraswati
- Occupation: Politician

Rabindra Narayan Behera is an Indian politician from Bhubaneswar, Odisha. He was elected as a Member of Parliament from Jajpur Lok Sabha constituency. He belongs to Bharatiya Janata Party.
