= Sakhigopal Mandir =

Hindu Mandir of Krishna

Coordinates: 19.816598°N 85.837626°E

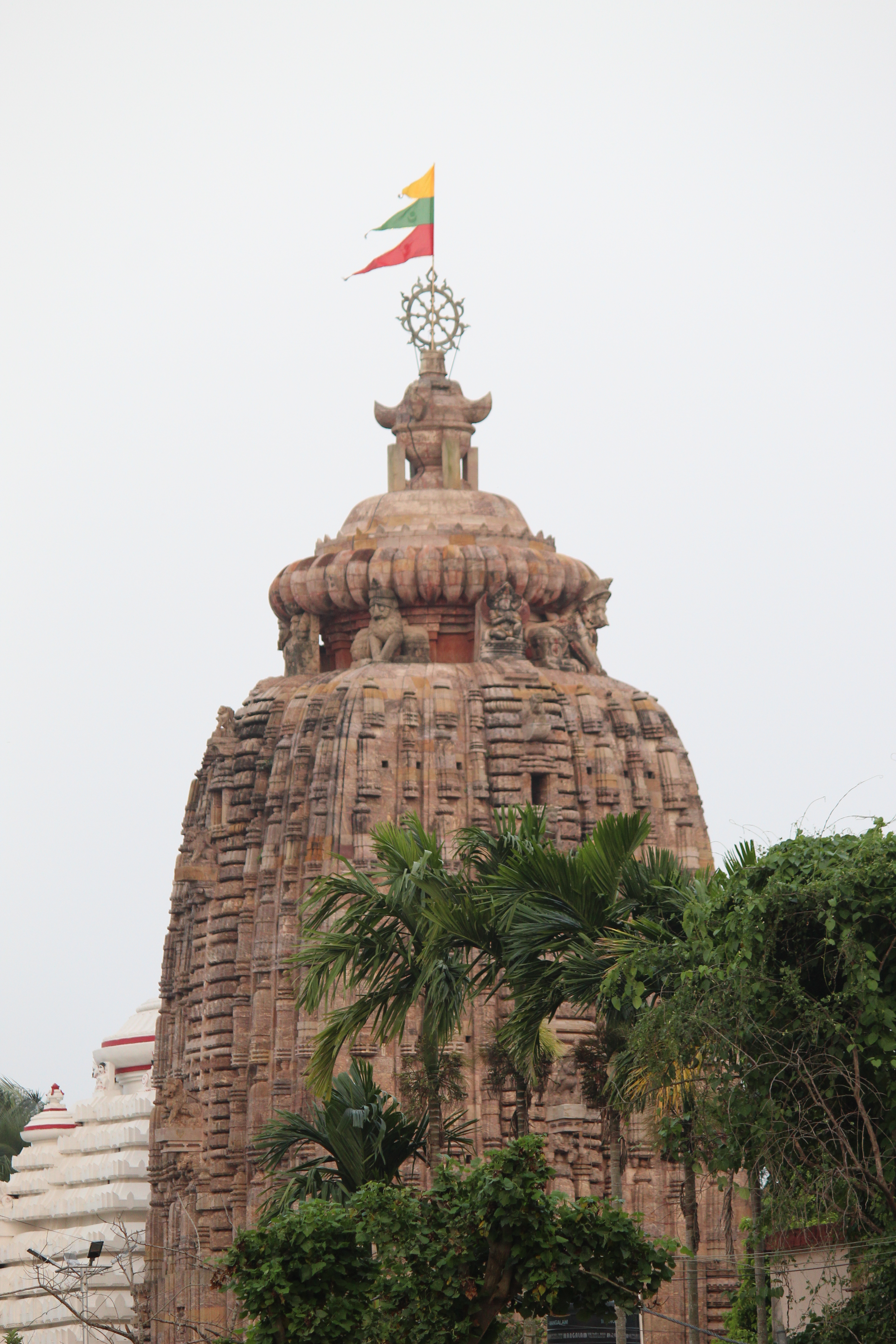
- Satyabadi Gopinath Mandir

Religion
- Affiliation: Hinduism
- Deity: Krishna

Location
- Location: Sakhigopal, Puri
- State: Odisha
- Country: India
- Interactive map of Sakhigopal Mandir

Architecture
- Type: Kalinga Architecture style

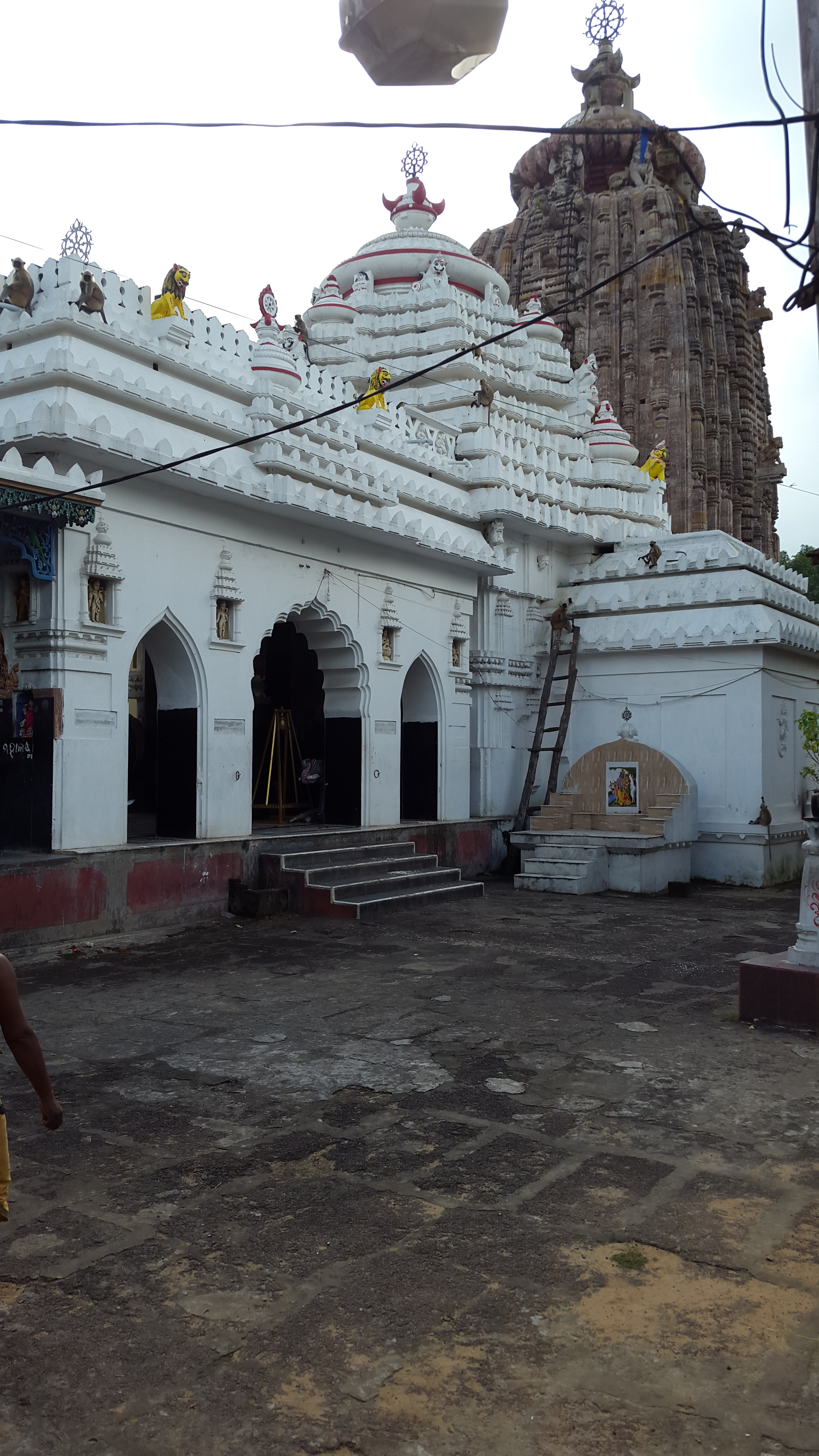
Satyabadi Gopinath Mandir in Sakshigopal

Sakhigopal Mandir (formally Satyabadi Gopinatha Mandir) is a medieval Hindu temple dedicated to Gopinath located in Sakhigopal on the Bhubaneshwar - Puri Highway in Odisha. The mandir is built in the Kalinga Architecture style.

== Origin ==
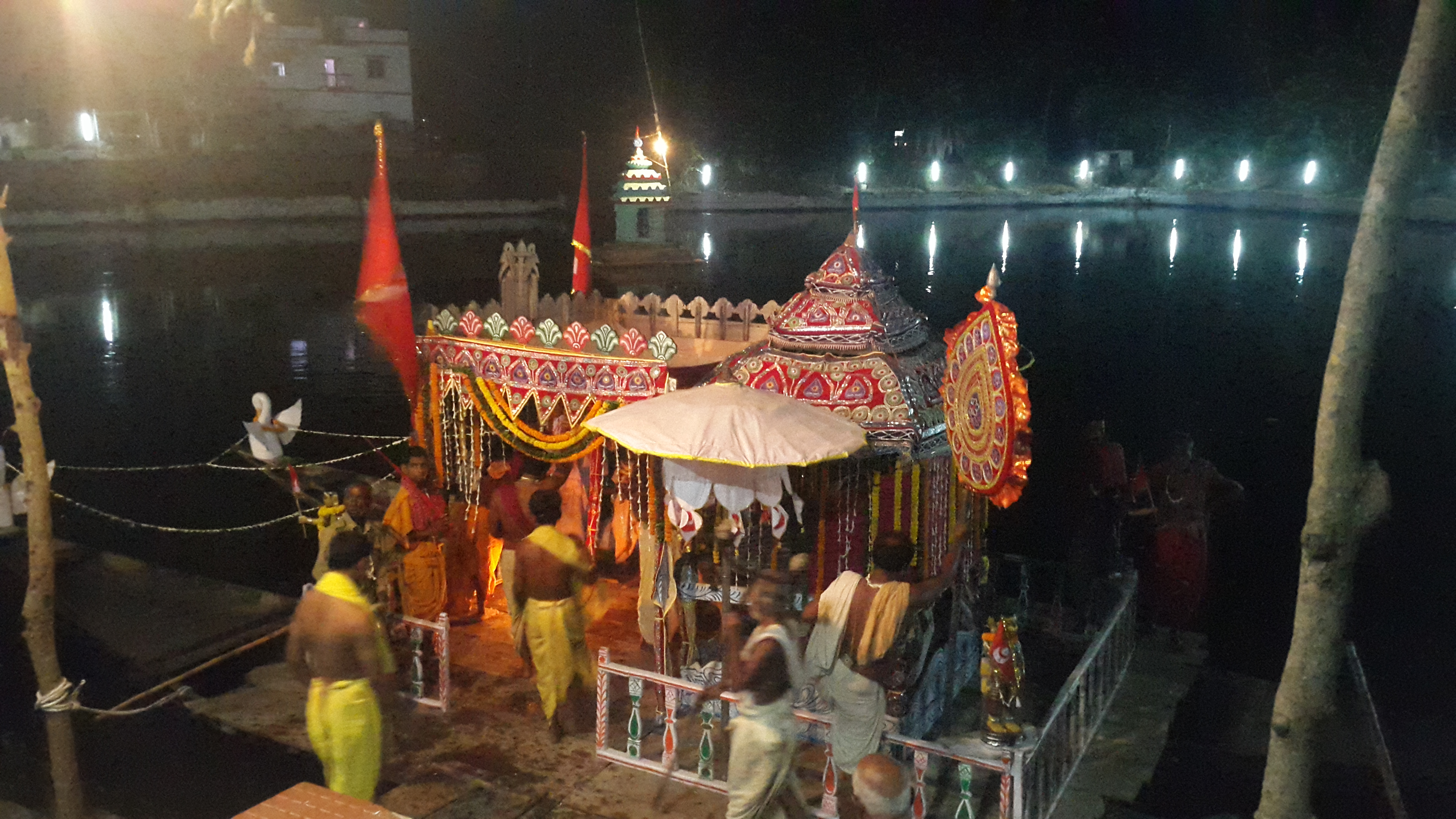
The annual chandana yatra festival of Satyabadi Gopinatha

It is said that a poor young man of the village, later named Sakshigopala, fell in love with the daughter of the village headman. However, being of a higher economic status, the headman opposed marriage between this young man and his daughter. The villagers, including the headman and the young man, went on a pilgrimage to Vrindavan. The village headman fell ill and was abandoned by fellow villagers. The young man tended to him so well that he soon got well, and, in gratitude, promised his daughter in marriage to the young man. As soon as they returned to the village, the headman went back on his promise, asking the young man to produce a witness in support of his claim.

Lord Gopala, impressed by the young man's devotion, agreed to come and bear witness to the promise on one condition: that the young man lead the way, and he would follow. But the young man must never look back. He led the way to the village, passing a mound of sand. As they passed, the man could not hear the Lord's footsteps and turned back. Immediately the Lord turned into a statue of stone rooted to the spot. The villagers were still so impressed that God himself came to back the young man's claim that the youngsters were married off; they were later appointed as the first priest of the temple built in Lord Gopala's honor who came to bear witness (known in Sanskrit as Sakshi).

== Deity made by Vajranabh (great grandson of Krishna) ==
King Vajranabh (the great-grandson of Lord Krishna) had 16 deities of Krishna and other gods carved from a rare, imperishable stone called Braja and built temples to house these deities in and around Mathura so as to feel the presence of Lord Krishna. The four presiding deities of Braja Mandala are Sri Harideva of Govardhan, Sri Keshava Deva of Mathura, Sri Baladeva of Baladeo, and Govindaji of Vrindavan. There are two Naths—Sri Nathji, who was originally at Govardhan and is now in Nathdwara, Rajasthan, and Sri Gopinath, who is now in Jaipur. The two Gopals are Sri Madana Mohana, who is now housed at Karoli Rajasthan, and Sakshi Gopala, who is now moved to the town of Sakhi Gopal, Odisha, near Puri.

== Anla Navami ==
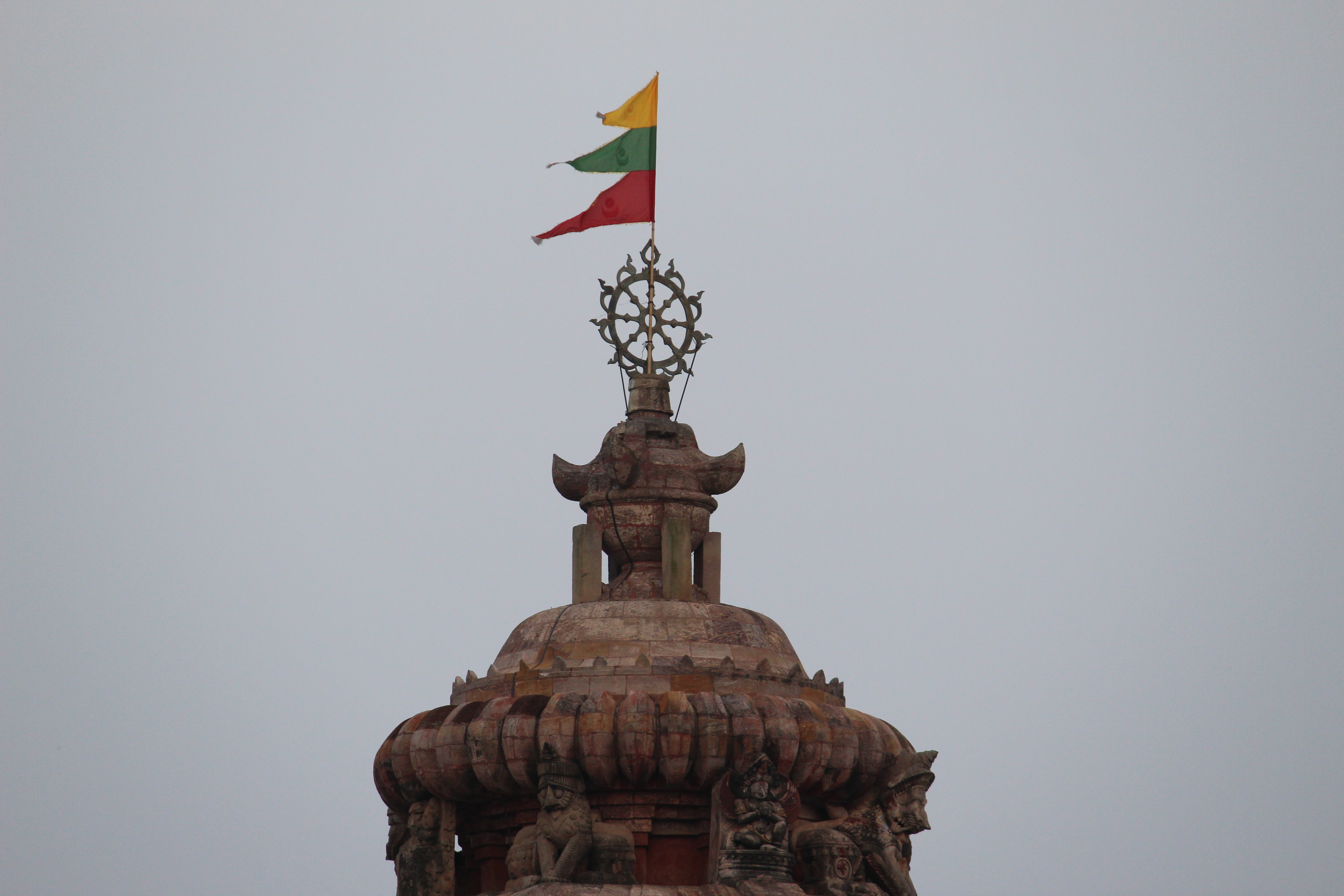
Gopalaji temple

The temple is famous for celebrating the annual Anla Navami Festival (Anla = gooseberry; Navami = ninth day in a lunar cycle). The festival is associated with the practice of touching Radha's feet (Radha was the legendary lover of Lord Krishna). Legend has it that the temple was originally built without a statue of Radha. But when a girl named Lakhmi claimed to be the incarnation of Radha, and it is believed that Lord Krishna (here as Gopala) should not be without his true love Radha, a statue from northern India was installed here. The statue had originally Ghagra and Choli adorned but when it was clad on a traditional saree of Odisha, the feet of the statue were visible and the priests took it as a holy sign. From that day Anla Navami is celebrated and Hindu pilgrims are allowed inside the temple to touch the goddess' feet. Hundreds of thousands of devotees throng the temple on this holy occasion

== Daily food offerings ==
The food offerings at Sakhigopala temple are made up of wheat instead of rice. This is one of the exceptional offerings among the worshiping processes of Vishnu temples all over the world, which is called prasada.
