= Taharpur, Thane =

Village in Maharashtra

Taharpur
- village
- Location in Maharashtra, India Taharpur (India)
- Coordinates: 19°33′N 73°15′E
- Country: India
- State: Maharashtra
- District: Thane

Languages
  - Official: Marathi
- Time zone: UTC+5:30 (IST)
- Vehicle registration: OR-

Taharpur is a village in Thane district of Maharashtra State, India.

Aghai is a nearby village.
