= Baghuapal =

Coordinates: 21.768671°N 86.736683°E

Baghuapal is a village located in the Barsahi (also spelled Badasahi) tehsil of Mayurbhanj district, in the state of Odisha, India. The village lies on the banks of the Budhabalanga River and is known for its historical significance, agricultural economy, and peaceful rural life

== History ==
The village's population mainly sodgop (gohola) which migrated from jharkhand and gauda and some scheduled caste like sing.

Baghuapal was a well-known center during the administration of Mughal. The king of Akbar and todarmal's administration was reflected in this village. A Mughal times well and a temple is also situated in center of the village.

== Geography ==
The total geographical area of village is 68 hectares (170 acres). Baghuapal has a total population of 389 people. There are about 123 houses in Baghuapal village. As per 2019 stats, Baghuapal villages comes under Badasahi assembly & Balasore parliamentary constituency. Baripada is the nearest town to Baghuapal, and is approximately 24 km (15 mi) away.

== Economy ==
Many of the younger people are employed by the Indian and Orissa governments. Some are working with private organizations, or are involved in their own businesses.

== Transport ==
According to Census 2011 information the location code or village code of Baghuapal village is 390647. Baghuapal village is located in Barsahi Tehsil of Mayurbhanj district in Odisha, India. It is situated 7 km (4.3 mi) from sub-district headquarters Barsahi and 30 km (19 mi) from district headquarters Baripada. As per 2009 stats, Sialighaty is the gram panchayat of Baghuapal village.

Baghuapal is also well connected with other cities by road.

== Educational institutes ==
Baghuapal has one school called Govt primary school, Baghuapal. The village has no high schools, colleges, or technical institutes.

== Politics ==
Baghuapal participates equally in electing delegates to the Lok Sabha.
