= Amar Kumar Nayak =

Indian politician

Member of the Odisha Legislative Assembly
- Incumbent
- Assumed office 4 June 2024
- Preceded by: Amar Prasad Satpathy
- Constituency: Barchana

Personal details
- Born: Amar Kumar Nayak; 15 May 1973 (age 53) Salapada, Odisha, India
- Party: Bharatiya Janata Party
- Education: Utkal University
- Profession: Politician

Amar Kumar Nayak (born 15 May 1973) is an Indian politician and a member of the Bharatiya Janata Party (BJP). He was elected to the Odisha Legislative Assembly from the Barchana in the 2024 elections.

== Early life and education ==
Nayak was born on 15 May 1973 in Salapada, Odisha. He holds a Master’s degree in Finance and Control and a Master’s degree in Tourism Administration from Utkal University. He resides in Bhubaneswar with his wife, Smt. Namita Dash, their son, and their daughter.

== Political career ==
Nayak started his political involvement as the General Secretary of Kendrapada College’s Students' Union. He ran independently in the 2014 Odisha Assembly elections, where he received widespread support. In the 2024 elections, he was elected to represent the Barchana constituency, defeating Varsha Priyadarshini by 6,310 votes.

Some of his significant achievements include:

- Establishing the Utkal University Rural Campus in Barchana.
- Leading initiatives for 100% electrification and improving housing availability through the Pradhan Mantri Awas Yojana (PMAY).
- Securing approximately ₹20 crore for the development of religious sites, including Lord Mahavinayak Temple and Chhatia Bhat.

Nayak also serves on the Standing Committee for Rural Development and is the President of the MARKFED Employees Union. He is committed to fostering cooperative development in Odisha.

== Personal life ==
Nayak resides in Bhubaneswar, Odisha, and maintains a permanent residence in Salapada, Odisha.
