= Pramila Mallik =

Indian politician

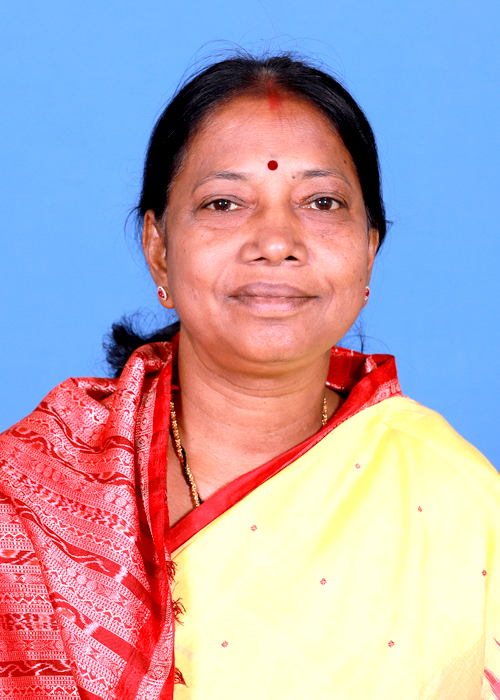

Speaker of the Odisha Legislative Assembly
- In office 22 September 2023 – 3 June 2024
- Governor: Ganeshi Lal; Raghubar Das
- Chief Minister: Naveen Patnaik
- Preceded by: Bikram Keshari Arukha
- Succeeded by: Surama Padhy

Member of the Odisha Legislative Assembly
- Incumbent
- Assumed office 2000
- Preceded by: Arjun Das
- In office 1990-1995
- Preceded by: Nabakishore Mallick
- Succeeded by: Arjun Das
- Constituency: Binjharpur

Personal details
- Born: 4 March 1963 (age 63)
- Party: Biju Janata Dal
- Other political affiliations: Janata Dal

Pramila Mallik (4 March 1963) is an Indian politician from Odisha. She was elected to the Odisha Legislative Assembly from Binjharpur in Jajpur district for a record seven times. She represents Biju Janata Dal. She was a former speaker and a minister. She won the 2024 Odisha Legislative Assembly election.

== Early life and education ==
Mallik hails from Binjharpur.

== Career ==
Mallik won the 2024 Odisha Legislative Assembly election from Binjharpur Assembly Constituency representing Biju Janata Dal. She defeated Babita Mallick of Bharatiya Janata Party by a margin of 2,856 votes. She defeated Babita in the previous election too, winning the 2019 Odisha Legislative Assembly election by over 20,000 votes.
