= Himanshu Sekhar Sahoo =

Indian politician

Member of Odisha Legislative Assembly
- Incumbent
- Assumed office 4 June 2024
- Preceded by: Pranab Kumar Balabantaray
- Constituency: Dharmasala

Personal details
- Born: jaraka
- Party: Bharatiya Janata Party
- Profession: Politician

Himanshu Sekhar Sahoo is an Indian politician. He was elected to the Odisha Legislative Assembly from Dharmasala as an independent politician after he was denied a party ticket but later rejoined the Bharatiya Janata Party.
