= Jajpur district =

- District
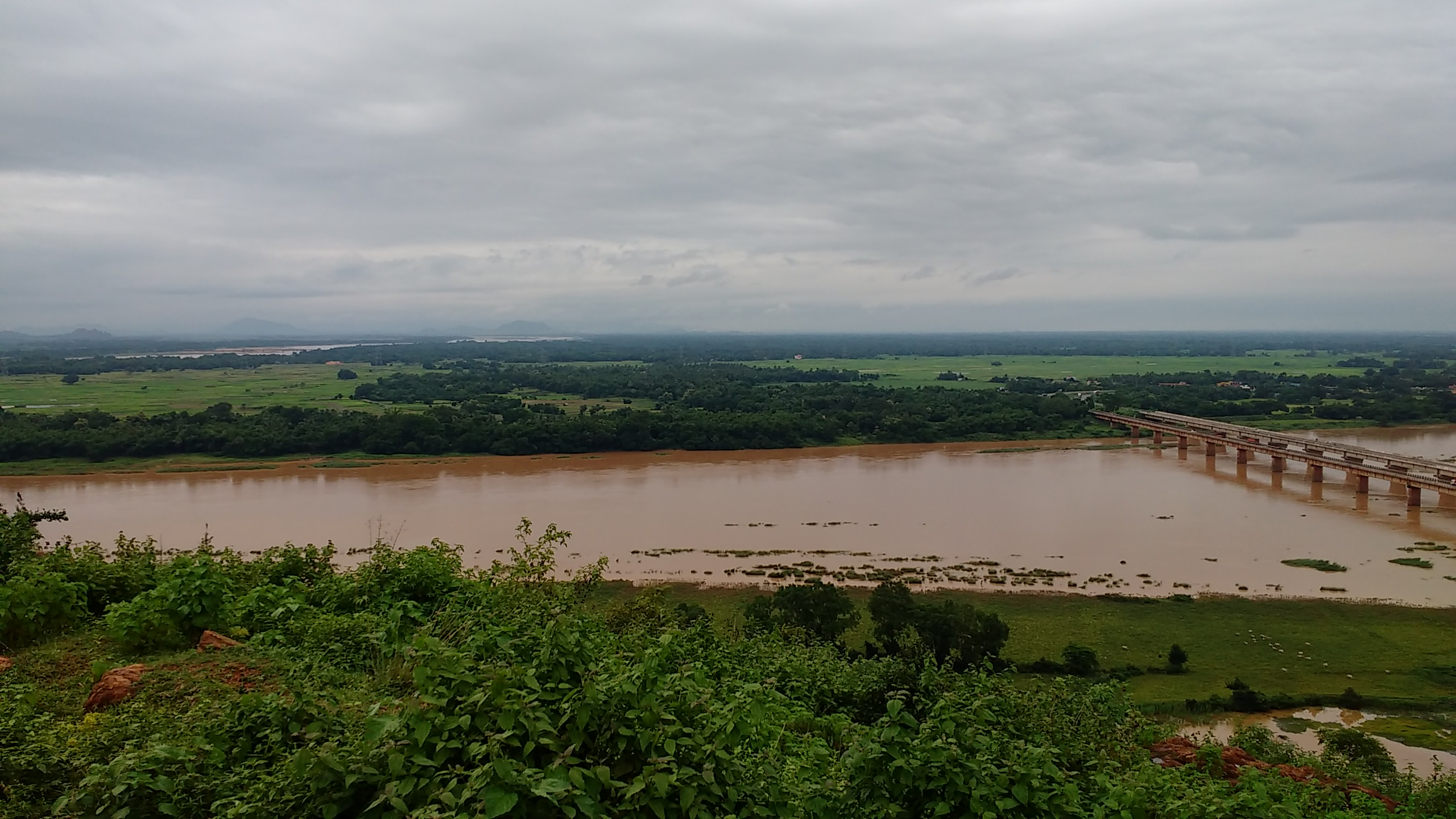
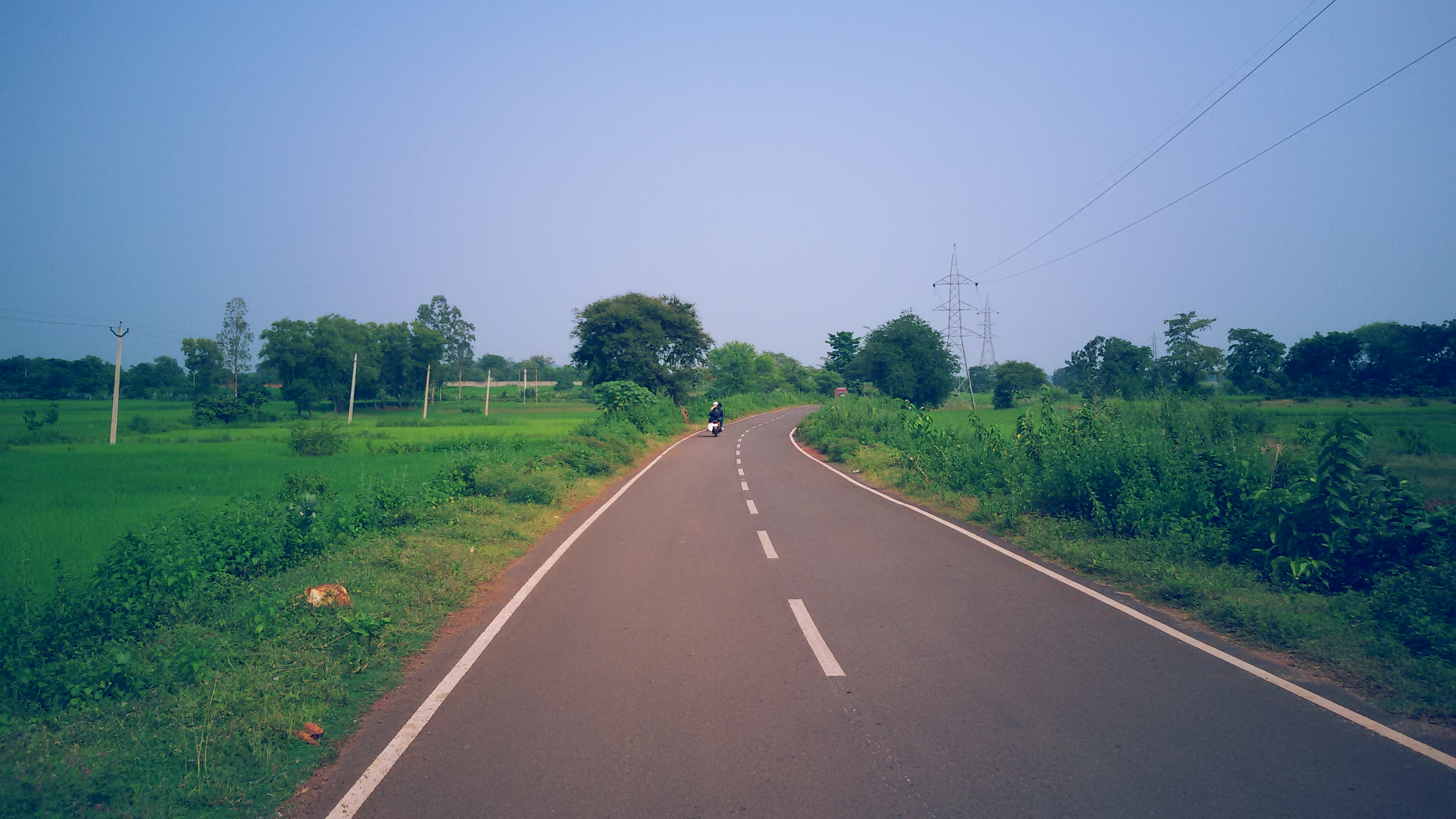
- Top: Brahmani River at Deulipal; Bottom: Road in Tomka
- Nickname: Jajra nagar
- Location in Odisha
- Coordinates: 20.85°N 86.333°E
- Country: India
- State: Odisha
- Headquarters: Jajpur

Government
  - Member of Lok Sabha: Rabindra Narayan Behera (BJP)

Area
  - Total: 2,888 km^{2} (1,115 sq mi)
- Elevation: 331 m (1,086 ft)

Population (2011)
  - Total: 1,827,192
  - Density: 632.7/km^{2} (1,639/sq mi)

Languages
  - Official: Odia, English
- Time zone: UTC+5:30 (IST)
- PIN: 755 xxx
- Vehicle registration: OD-04 (for Chandikhol); OD-34 (for Jajpur)
- Literacy: 80.13%
- Lok Sabha constituency: Jajpur
- Vidhan Sabha constituency: 7: Barchana Bari Binjharpur Dharmasala Jajpur Sukinda Korai
- Climate: Aw (Köppen)
- Precipitation: 1,014 millimetres (39.9 in)
- Avg. summer temperature: 38 °C (100 °F)
- Avg. winter temperature: 12 °C (54 °F)
- Website: jajpur.nic.in

Jajpur district is a district of Odisha state in eastern India. The Odisha Government carried out a re-organisation of districts of Odisha in 1993. The erstwhile Cuttack district was split into multiple districts with Jajpur being one of them. The district came into being on 1 April 1993.

== Geography ==
Jajpur is located in eastern Odisha. It borders Kendujhar and Bhadrak districts to the northeast, Kendrapara and Cuttack districts to the south and Dhenkanal district to the west. The district is located on the Odisha coastal plain, with the southern part lying in the Mahanadi River Delta. To the north there are some small discontinuous hill ranges. Some of the major rivers in the district are the Brahmani and Baitarani on the eastern edge.

== Demographics ==
Historical population
Year	Pop.	±% p.a.
1901	544,846	—
1911	558,053	+0.24%
1921	542,368	−0.28%
1931	577,357	+0.63%
1941	604,551	+0.46%
1951	624,633	+0.33%
1961	760,182	+1.98%
1971	948,564	+2.24%
1981	1,136,093	+1.82%
1991	1,386,177	+2.01%
2001	1,624,341	+1.60%
2011	1,827,192	+1.18%

Religions in Jajpur district (2011)
Religion	Percent
Hinduism	94.44%
Islam	5.12%
Other or not stated	0.44%

According to the 2011 census, Jajpur district has a population of 1,827,192, roughly equal to the nation of Kosovo or the US state of Nebraska. This gives it a ranking of 261st in India (out of a total of 640). The district has a population density of 630 inhabitants per square kilometre (1,600/sq mi). Its population growth rate over the 2001–2011 decade was 12.43%. Jajpur has a sex ratio of 972 females for every 1000 males, and a literacy rate of 80.44%. 7.39% of the population lives in urban areas. Scheduled Castes and Scheduled Tribes made up 23.72% and 8.29% of the population respectively.

Languages of Jajpur district (2011)
1. Odia (90.3%)
2. Urdu (4.79%)
3. Ho (2.09%)
4. Others (2.85%)

At the time of the 2011 Census of India, 90.27% of the population in the district spoke Odia, 4.79% Urdu and 2.09% Ho as their first language.

== Administrative divisions ==
The district is divided into 10 revenue Tehsils as below.

- Jajpur
- Dasarathapur
- Binjharpur
- Bari
- Rasulpur
- Dharmasala
- Darpan
- Vyasanagar
- Danagadi
- Sukinda

The district consists of 1 subdivision Jajpur. It also consists of 10 blocks.

- Jajpur
- Binjharpur
- Bari
- Dasarathapur
- Rasulpur
- Dharmasala
- Barchana
- Korei
- Danagadi
- Sukinda

The district has 331 Gram Panchayats and 1781 villages.

The district has 2 municipalities Byasanagar and Jajpur, with the later serving as the district headquarters.

Villages

- Garagali
- Kacharasahi
- Neulpur

BARUNDEI

- Matiapada
- Sahupada
- Atira
- Gahapal

== Politics ==
The district consists of one Parliamentary constituency Jajpur. This is currently represented by Rabindra narayan behera of Bharatiya Janata Party.

=== Vidhan Sabha constituencies ===
The following are the 7 Vidhan sabha constituencies of Jajpur district along with the incumbent elected members.

No.	Constituency	Reservation	Extent of the Assembly Constituency (Blocks)	Member of 17th Assembly	Party
48	Binjharpur	SC	Binjharpur, Dasarathpur (part)	Pramila Mallik	BJD
49	Bari	None	Bari, Jajpur (part), Rasulpur (part)	Biswa Ranjan Mallick	BJD
50	Barchana	None	Barchana	Amar Kumar Nayak	BJP
51	Dharmasala	None	Dharmasala, Rasulpur (part)	Himanshu Sekhar Sahoo	BJP
52	Jajpur	None	Jajpur (M), Jajpur (part), Dasharathpur (part)	Sujata Sahu	BJD
53	Korei	None	Vyasanagar (M), Vyasanagar (O. G), Korei, Rasulpur (part)	Akash Das Nayak	BJP
54	Sukinda	None	Sukinda, Dangadi	Pradeep Bal Samanta	BJP

== Colleges ==
- N.C. Autonomous College, Jajpur Town
- Vyasanagar Autonomous College, Vyasanagar, Jajpur
- S G College, Kanikapada, Jajpur
- Kanhu Charan Mahavidyalaya, Khan market, Korei, Jajpur
- Gopabandhu Choudhury College, Ramachandrapur, Bari, Jajpur
- Abhimanyu Samanta Singhar College, Abhimayu Balia, Bari, Jajpur

== Culture ==
- Biraja Temple
- Ratnagiri
- Chhatia Bata Temple
- Mahavinayak Temple
- Langudi Hills
- Dashashwamedha Ghat
- Siddheshwar Temple
- Trilochaneshwar Temple
- Garhmadhupur King Palace
