= Sambalpur Lok Sabha constituency =

Lok Sabha constituency in Odisha

Coordinates: 21.347144°N 83.628632°E

Sambalpur OD-3
- Lok Sabha constituency
- Sambalpur Lok Sabha constituency

Constituency details
- Country: India
- Region: East India
- State: Odisha
- Assembly constituencies: Kuchinda; Rengali; Sambalpur; Rairakhol; Deogarh; Chhendipada; Athmallik
- Established: 1952
- Total electors: 15,01,538 (Note: as on 2024) (Note: as data published by election commission)
- Reservation: None

Member of Parliament
- 18th Lok Sabha
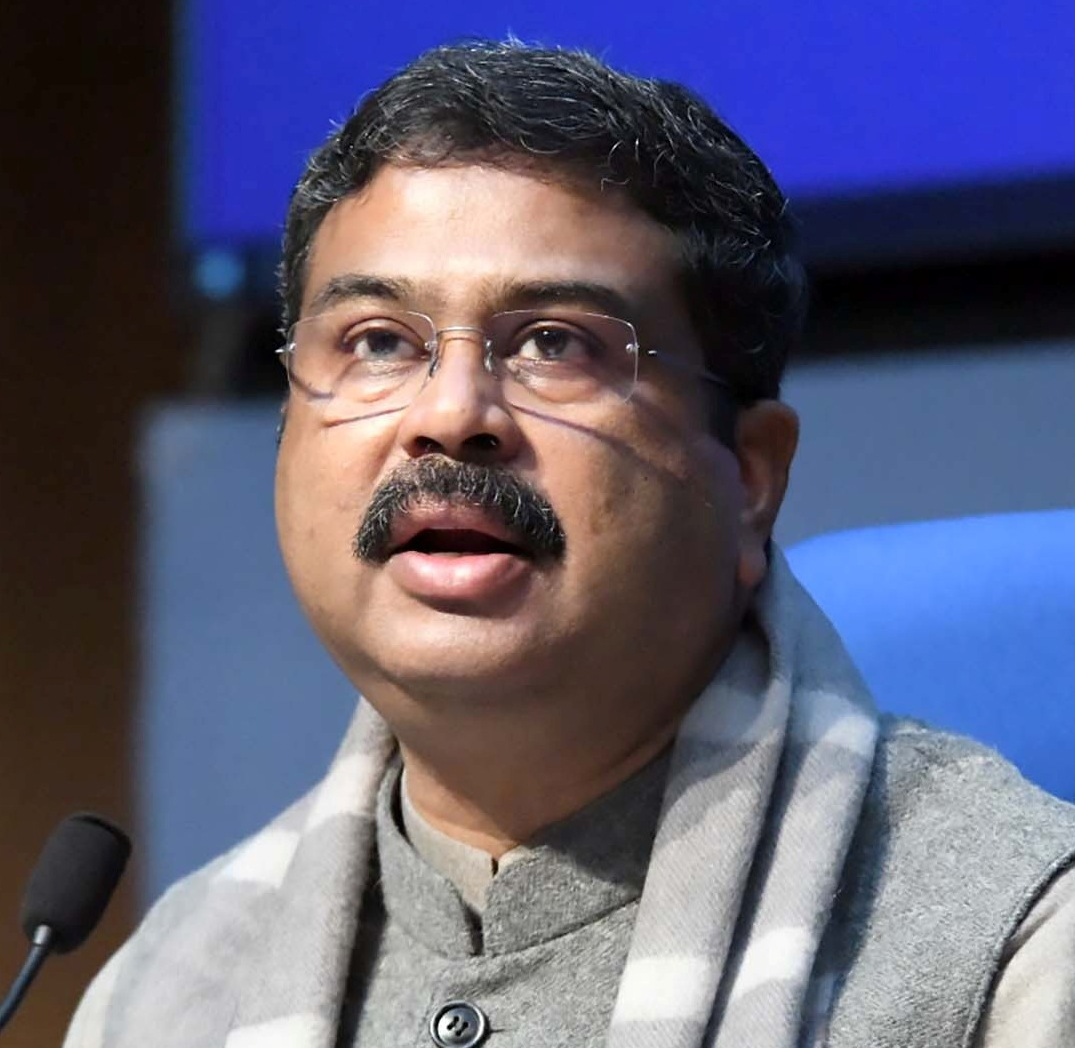
- Incumbent Dharmendra Pradhan
- Party: BJP
- Elected year: 2024

Sambalpur Lok Sabha constituency is one of the 21 Lok Sabha (parliamentary) constituencies in Odisha state in eastern India. This constituency covers the whole Sambalpur district and parts of Deogarh and Angul districts.

== Assembly Segments ==
Before delimitation, the legislative assembly segments which constituted this parliamentary constituency were: Padmapur, Melchhamunda, Bijepur, Bhatli, Bargarh, Sambalpur and Rairakhol.

Following delimitation of parliamentary constituencies, this constituency presently comprises the following legislative assembly segments:

#	Name	District	Member	Party	Leading (in 2024)
15	Kuchinda	Sambalpur	Rabi Narayan Naik	BJP	BJP
16	Rengali (SC)	Sambalpur	Sudarshan Haripal	BJD	BJP
17	Sambalpur	Sambalpur	Jayanarayan Mishra	BJP	BJP
18	Rairakhol	Sambalpur	Prasanna Acharya	BJD	BJP
19	Deogarh	Deogarh	Romancha Ranjan Biswal	BJD	BJP
62	Chhendipada (SC)	Angul	Agasti Behera	BJP	BJP
63	Athmallik	Angul	Nalini Kanta Pradhan	BJD	BJD

Kuchinda and Deogarh assembly segments were earlier in erstwhile Deogarh constituency. Rengali assembly segment came into existence in 2008 following delimitation of legislative assembly constituencies.

== Elected members ==
Vote share of winning candidates
2024	49.48%
2019	42.05%
2014	27.65%
2009	24.72%
2004	48.18%
1999	57.56%
1998	45.77%
1996	45.23%
1991	44.82%
1989	54.56%
1984	60.68%
1980	53.95%
1977	59.49%
1971	40.72%

Since its formation in 1952, 18 elections have been held till date.

List of members elected from Sambalpur constituency are:

Year	Member	Party
1951	Natabar Pandey	Ganatantra Parishad
1957	Shraddhakar Supakar	Ganatantra Parishad
1957	Banamali Kumbhar	Ganatantra Parishad
1962	Kishen Pattnaik	Socialist Party
1967	Shraddhakar Supakar	Indian National Congress
1971	Banamali Babu	Indian National Congress
1977	Gananath Pradhan	Bharatiya Lok Dal
1980	Krupasindhu Bhoi	Indian National Congress (I)
1984	Krupasindhu Bhoi	Indian National Congress
1989	Bhabani Shankar Hota	Janata Dal
1991	Krupasindhu Bhoi	Indian National Congress
1996	Krupasindhu Bhoi	Indian National Congress
1998	Prasanna Acharya	Biju Janata Dal
1999	Prasanna Acharya	Biju Janata Dal
2004	Prasanna Acharya	Biju Janata Dal
2009	Amarnath Pradhan	Indian National Congress
2014	Nagendra Pradhan	Biju Janata Dal
2019	Nitesh Ganga Deb	Bharatiya Janata Party
2024	Dharmendra Pradhan	Bharatiya Janata Party

== Election results ==
=== 2024 ===
Voting were held on 25th May 2024 in 6th phase of Indian General Election. Counting of votes was on 4th June 2024. In 2024 election, Bharatiya Janata Party candidate Dharmendra Pradhan defeated Biju Janata Dal candidate Pranab Prakash Das by a margin of 1,19,836 votes.

2024 Indian general election: Sambalpur
Party	Candidate	Votes	%	±%
BJP	Dharmendra Pradhan	592,162	49.48	
BJD	Pranab Prakash Das	4,72,326	39.47	
INC	Nagendra Kumar Pradhan	89,113	7.45	
NOTA	None of the above	12,483	1.04	
Majority		1,19,836	10.01	
Turnout		12,00,815	79.97	
BJP hold				

=== 2019 ===
In 2019 election, Bharatiya Janata Party candidate Nitesh Ganga Deb defeated Biju Janata Dal candidate Nalini Kanta Pradhan by a margin of 9,162 votes.

2019 Indian general elections: Sambalpur
Party	Candidate	Votes	%	±%
BJP	Nitesh Ganga Deb	473,770	42.13	
BJD	Nalini Kanta Pradhan	4,64,608	41.32	
INC	Sarat Pattanayak	1,35,969	12.09	
NOTA	None of the above	13,456	1.20	
Margin of victory		9,162	0.81	
Turnout		11,26,662	76.72	
BJP gain from BJD				

=== 2014 ===
In 2014 election, Biju Janata Dal candidate Nagendra Kumar Pradhan defeated Bharatiya Janata Party candidate Suresh Pujari by a margin of 30,576 votes.

2014 Indian general elections: Sambalpur
Party	Candidate	Votes	%	±%
BJD	Nagendra Kumar Pradhan	358,618	36.43	
BJP	Suresh Pujari	3,28,042	33.33	
INC	Amarnath Pradhan	2,42,131	24.6	
NOTA	None of the above	13,314	1.35	−
Majority		30,576	3.10	−
Turnout		9,84,697	75.92	
Registered electors		12,97,098		
BJD gain from INC				

=== 2009 ===
In 2009 election, Indian National Congress candidate Amarnath Pradhan defeated Biju Janata Dal candidate Rohit Pujari by a margin of 14,974 votes.

2009 Indian general elections: Sambalpur
Party	Candidate	Votes	%	±%
INC	Amarnath Pradhan	304,890	38.09	
BJD	Rohit Pujari	2,90,016	36.23	
BJP	Surendra Lath	1,50,910	18.85	
Majority		14,874	1.86	
Turnout		8,00,420	64.90	
INC hold				
