= Romanch Ranjan Biswal =

Indian politician

Romanch Ranjan Biswal (born 1981) is an Indian politician from Odisha. He is a member of the Odisha Legislative Assembly from Deogarh Assembly constituency in Deogarh district. He was elected in the 2024 Odisha Legislative Assembly election representing the Biju Janata Dal.

== Early life and education ==
Biswal is from Deogarh, Odisha. He is the son of Jhasaketan Biswal. He studied Class 12 at Panchayat College, Kalla and passed the examinations in 1998. Later, he discontinued his studies.

== Career ==
Biswal won from Deogarh Assembly constituency representing Biju Janata Dal in the 2024 Odisha Legislative Assembly election. He polled 89,074 votes and defeated his nearest rival, Subhash Chandra Panigrahi of Bharatiya Janata Party, by a margin of 15,792 votes. Earlier, he lost the 2019 Odisha Legislative Assembly election. In 2019, he polled 67,249 votes and lost to his nearest rival and winner, Subhash Chandra Panigrahi, who contested on the Biju Janata Dal ticket, by a margin of 7,106 votes. Panigrahi got 74,355 votes.

In 2024, Arundhati Devi, the wife of former Deogarh king and Sambalpur MP Nitesh Ganga Dev was initially announced as the candidate but BJD party replaced her with Biswal due to local resistance against her, and Biswal won the Deogarh seat, that is part of Sambalpur Lok Sabha constituency.
