= Gananath Pradhan =

Indian politician (1924–2004)

Member of Parliament, Lok Sabha
- In office 1977–1980
- Preceded by: Banamali Babu
- Succeeded by: Krupasindhu Bhoi
- Constituency: Sambalpur, Odisha

Personal details
- Born: 7 December 1924 Sikirdi, Sambalpur District Orissa, British India
- Died: 14 October 2004 (aged 79)
- Party: Janata Party

Gananath Pradhan (7 December 1924 – 14 October 2004) was an Indian politician, belonging to the Janata Party. He was elected to the Lok Sabha the lower house of Indian Parliament from Sambalpur in Odisha. He died in October 2004 at the age of 79.
