= Kishore Chandra Naik =

Member of Odisha Legislative Assembly
- In office 29 April 2019 – 4 June 2024
- Preceded by: Rabi Narayan Naik
- Succeeded by: Rabi Narayan Naik
- Constituency: Kuchinda

Personal details
- Born: Kishore Chandra Naik; 24 May 1973 (age 53) Kuchinda, Sambalpur District
- Citizenship: Indian
- Party: Biju Janata Dal (April 2019 – present)
- Other political affiliations: Bharatiya Janata Party (Before April 2019)
- Spouse: Pushpalata Naik
- Children: Two daughters
- Parent: Raghuram Naik
- Education: Sambalpur University
- Occupation: Politician,Advocate

Kishore Chandra Naik is an Indian politician and former cricketer. He was a member of the Odisha Legislative Assembly from Kuchinda from 2019 to 2024. His party dropped him from the seat for the 2024 election.

== Election results ==
Odisha Legislative Assembly
Year	Constituency	Candidate	Votes	Pct	Opponent(s)	Votes	Pct	Ballots cast	Majority	Turnout
2019	No.15 Kuchinda	Kishore Chandra Naik (BJD)	72,601	41.71%	Rabinarayan Naik (BJP)	69,093	39.69%	174,063	3,508	80.37%
2019	No.15 Kuchinda	Kishore Chandra Naik (BJD)	72,601	41.71%	Sovaram Padhan (INC)	24,795	14.24%	174,063	3,508	80.37%
2019	No.15 Kuchinda	Kishore Chandra Naik (BJD)	72,601	41.71%	Ratha Munda (BSP)	1,930	1.11%	174,063	3,508	80.37%
2019	No.15 Kuchinda	Kishore Chandra Naik (BJD)	72,601	41.71%	Abhilas Prasant Manki (AAP)	950	0.55%	174,063	3,508	80.37%
2019	No.15 Kuchinda	Kishore Chandra Naik (BJD)	72,601	41.71%	Padmini Bhoi (HND)	784	0.45%	174,063	3,508	80.37%
2019	No.15 Kuchinda	Kishore Chandra Naik (BJD)	72,601	41.71%	Sankar Bagh (IND)	1,105	0.63%	174,063	3,508	80.37%
2019	No.15 Kuchinda	Kishore Chandra Naik (BJD)	72,601	41.71%	None of the above	2,805	1.61%	174,063	3,508	80.37%
