= Keshapali =

- Village
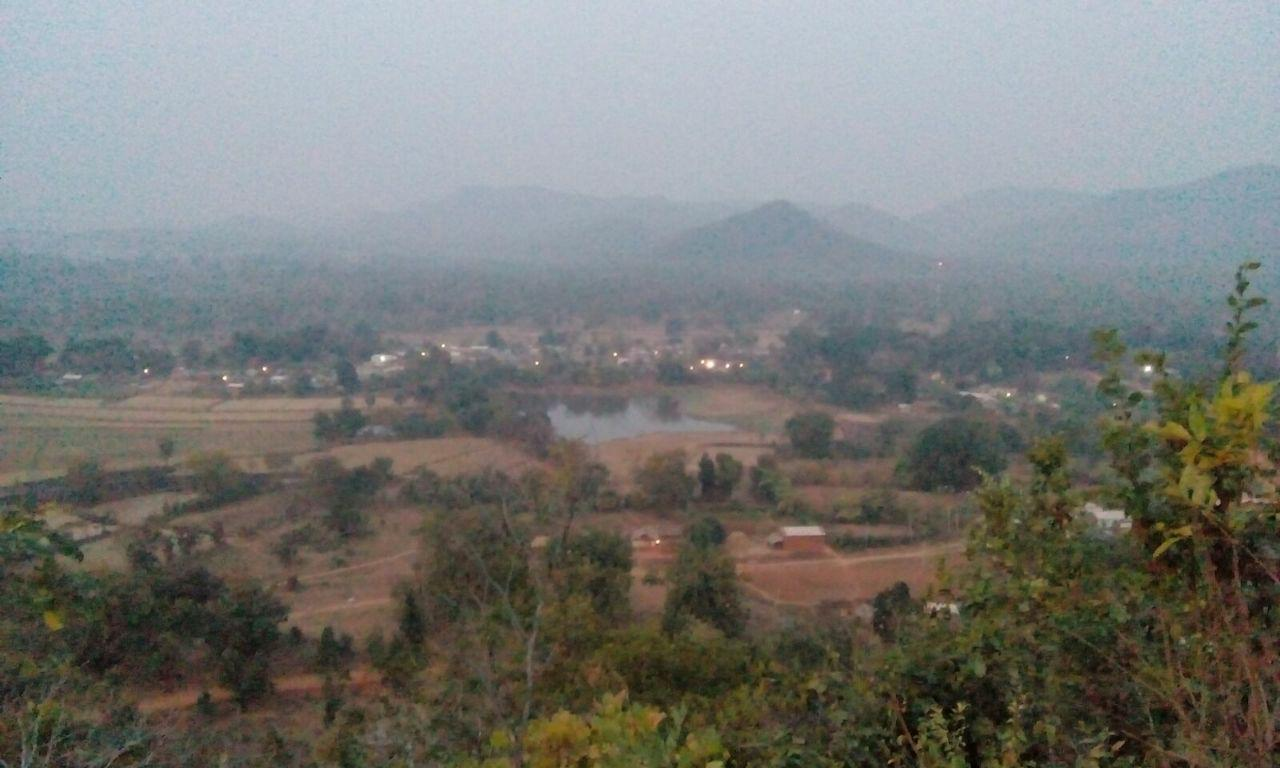
- Picture taken from Gobadhan Hill of Keshapali

- Location in Odisha, India
- Coordinates: 21.2089316°N 84.0212549°E
- Country: India
- State: Odisha
- District: Sambalpur

Government
  - Type: Panchayati raj (India)
  - Body: Gram panchayat
  - Sarpanch: Ritanjali Naik

Population (2011)
  - Total: 832

Languages
  - Official: Odia
  - Other spoken: Sambalpuri, Hindi
- Time zone: UTC+5:30 (IST)
- Postal code: 768105
- Area code: 768105
- Website: odisha.gov.in

Keshapali is a small census village in Jujumura Block of Sambalpur district of Indian state, Odisha. It is administered under Keshapali Grampanchayat and comes under the Jujumura Tahsil and it is a crucial booth of Rairakhol constituency. The small village had a population of 832 in 2011. Keshapali has two Aganwadi centers, a primary school, a high school, a primary hospital and also a primary animal hospital. Goverdhan Puja is the famous festival of the village.

== Government Offices ==
1. Keshapali Panchayat Office
2. Post Office Keshapali
3. Revenue Office Keshapali
4. Primary Hospital Keshapali
5. Primary Animal Asylum

== Education ==
There are two Anganwadi Centers, namely Keshapali-A and Keshapali-B, where the children are taken care up-to 5 years old. A Primary School is also in the village, where only three teachers are there for class 1 to 5. A Govt. High School is also here. Hostel facility is also provided to girls belongs to SCs and STs category.

== Gallery ==
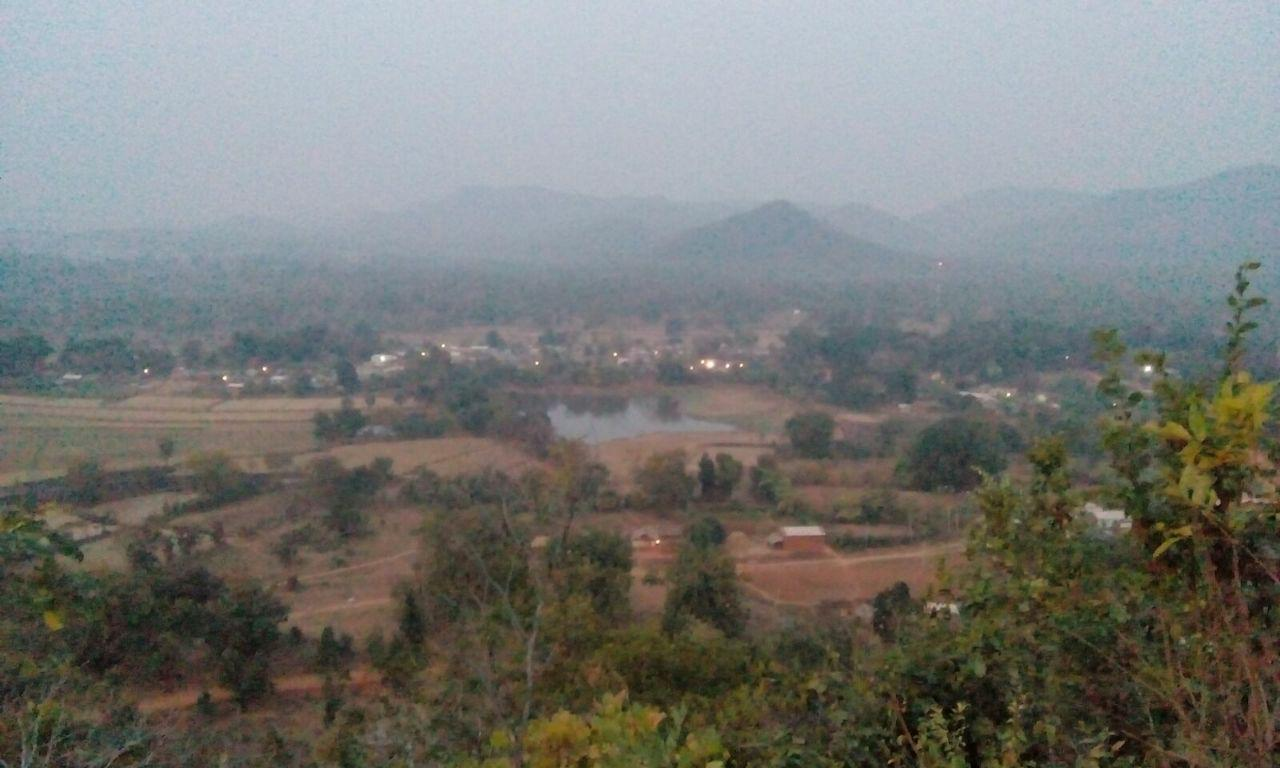

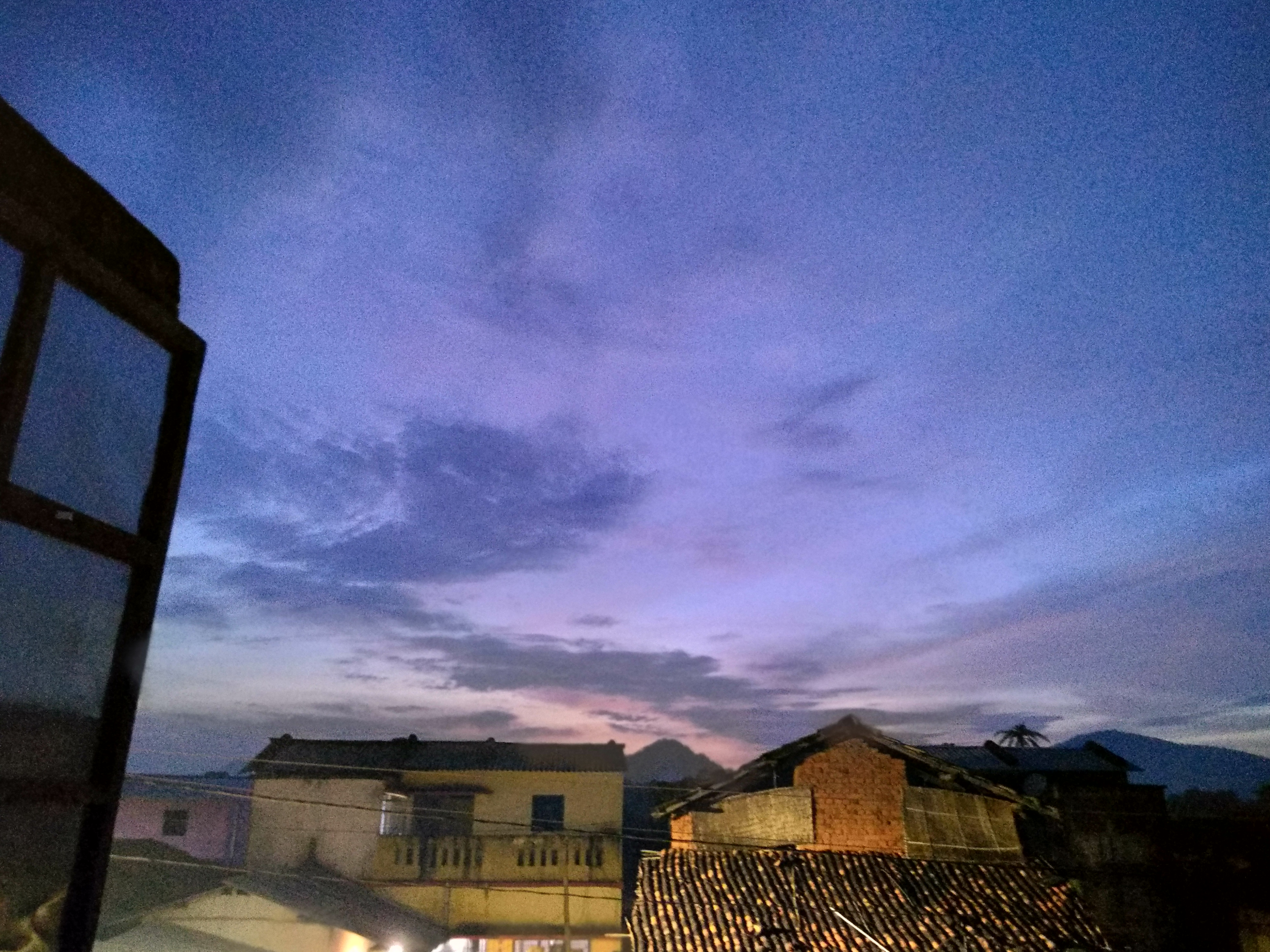

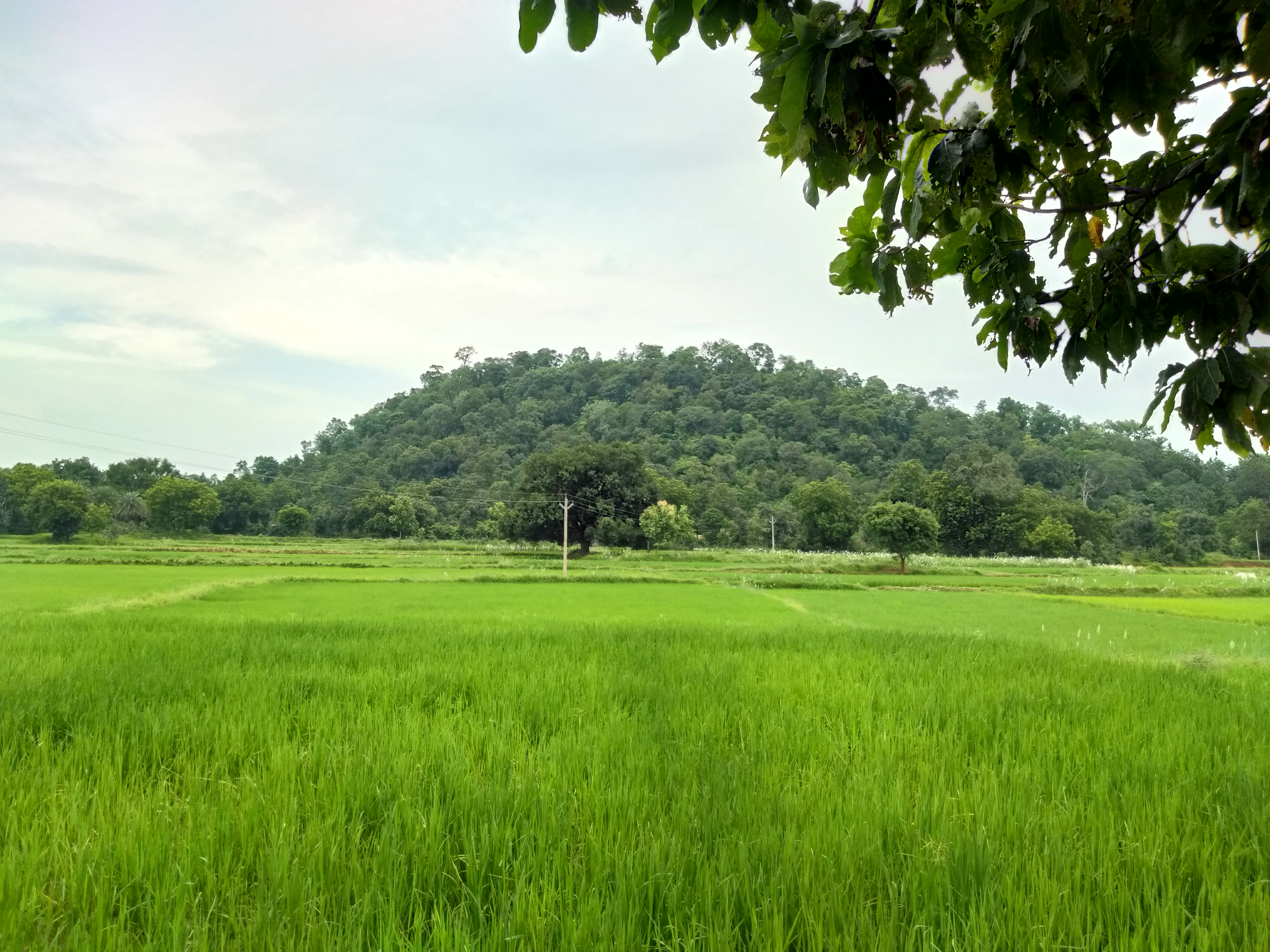
Keshapali govardhan parvat

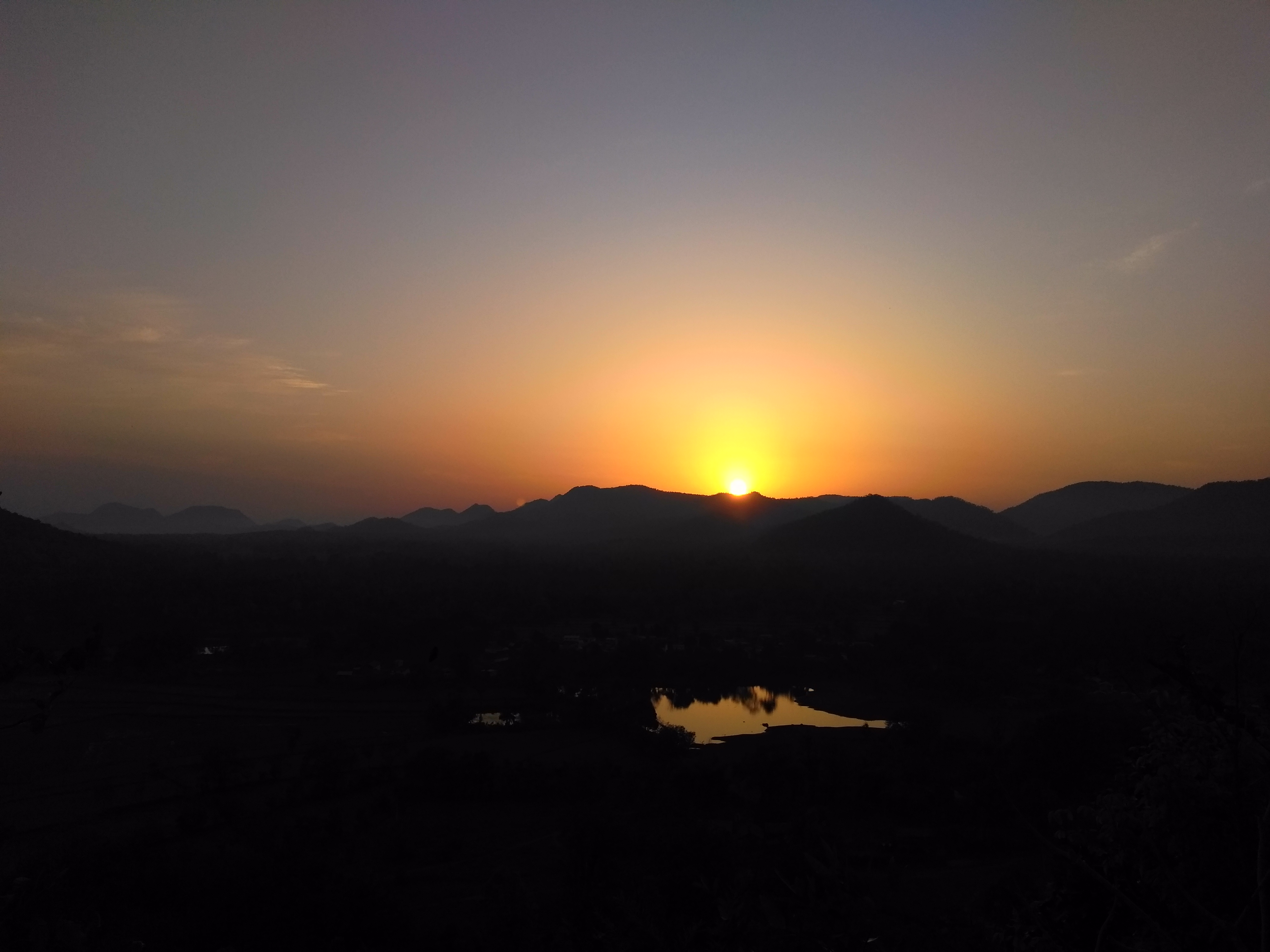
Keshapali Evening View

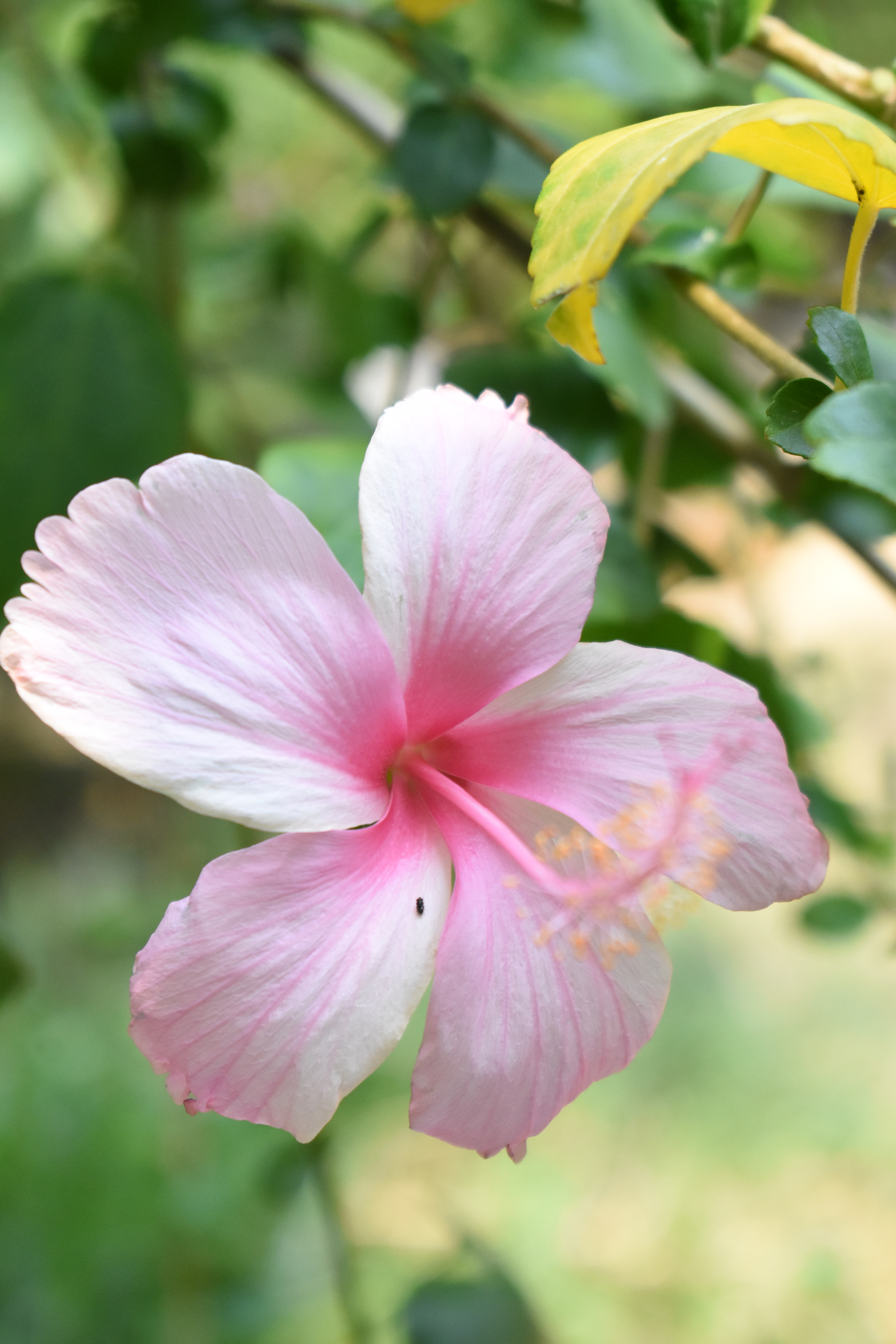
