= Prasanna Acharya =

Indian politician

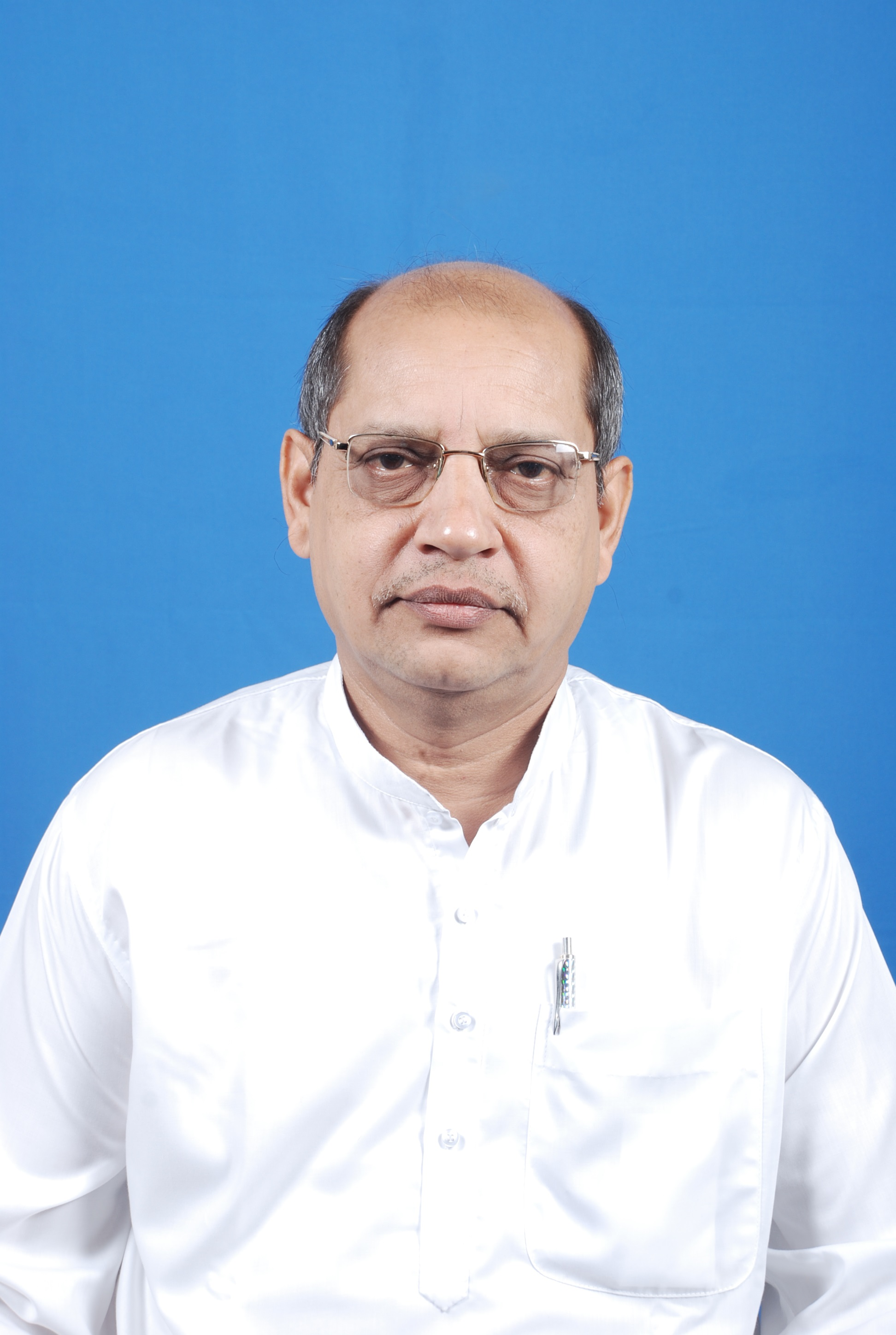
- Official Mla Portrait Of 2014

Deputy Leader of Opposition in Odisha Legislative Assembly
- Incumbent
- Assumed office 19 Jun 2024
- Leader: Naveen Patnaik

Member of Odisha Legislative Assembly
- Incumbent
- Assumed office 4 Jun 2024
- Preceded by: Rohit Pujari
- Constituency: Rairakhol
- In office 2009–2014
- Preceded by: Sanatan Bisi
- Succeeded by: Rohit Pujari
- Constituency: Rairakhol
- In office 1990–1998
- Preceded by: Jadumani Pradhan (Congress)
- Succeeded by: Ananda Acharya (BJD)
- Constituency: Bargarh

Member of Parliament, Rajya Sabha
- In office 2 July 2016 – 1 July 2022
- Preceded by: Pyarimohan Mohapatra
- Succeeded by: Manas Ranjan Mangaraj

Member of Parliament, Lok Sabha
- In office 1998–2009
- Preceded by: Krupasindhu Bhoi
- Succeeded by: Amarnath Pradhan
- Constituency: Sambalpur

Personal details
- Born: 8 August 1949 (age 77) Bargarh, Orissa, India
- Party: Biju Janata Dal
- Other political affiliations: Bharatiya Janata Party; Janata Dal
- Spouse: Charusila Acharya
- Children: 2 Daughters
- Relatives: Debesh Acharya (Nephew); କୃତାର୍ଥ ଆଚାର୍ଯ୍ୟ (Father); ଆନନ୍ଦ ଆଚାର୍ଯ୍ୟ (Brother)
- Education: Panchayat College Bargarh
- Profession: Politician

Prasanna Acharya (born 8 August 1949) is an Indian politician from Odisha, India. He is a former member of parliament in the Rajya Sabha. He is a member of the Biju Janata Dal.

He is a state vice president of Biju Janata Dal. He is currently serving as the Deputy Leader of Opposition in the Odisha Legislative Assembly. He represents the Rairakhol Assembly constituency in the Sambalpur district.

== Career ==
Acharya, was a cabinet minister in the Biju Patnaik led Janta Dal government from 1990 to 1995 (representing Bargarh constituency) and also in the Biju Janta dal government from 2009 to 2014. He was also a member of the national parliament, the 13th and the 14th Lok Sabha of India. He represented the Sambalpur constituency of Odisha.

In May 2009 Prasanna Acharya stood for election to the Odisha Assembly again rather than for the national parliament. He was elected to represent the regional constituency of Rairakhol by a majority of around 10,000 votes. In the 2014 Odisha Legislative Assembly election Prasanna Acharya lost to Subal Sahu of Indian National Congress by a margin of 458 votes from Bijepur. In 2019 Prasanna Acharya lost to Suresh Pujari of Bharatiya Janata Party in Loksabha election from Bargarh.

Acharya also held the post of the Minister of Finance, Health, Rural Development etc in Odisha. He is known to be amongst the very few leaders who have had a chance to represent people at a state assembly, and both the houses of parliament i.e Lok Sabha and Rajya Sabha.
