= List of schools and colleges in Sambalpur =

Sambalpur District is a district in the western part of state of Orissa, India. The historic city of Sambalpur is the district headquarters. The district is located in the Mahanadi River basin. It has a total area of 6,702 square kilometers, of which almost 60% is covered in dense forest. The district is bounded by Deogarh District to the east, Bargarh and Jharsuguda districts to the west, Sundergarh District to the north, and Subarnapur and Angul districts in the south.

== Literacy ==
In 2011 the literacy rate of the district was 76.91%. The male literacy rate was 85.17% and female literacy rate 68.47%.

== Education system ==
The education system in rural areas is government operated. Government runs primary, high and secondary schools. In urban areas the system is a mix of government and private operated schools. There are colleges for higher education both in rural and urban areas but most of them are located in urban or semi-urban places. This is a list of educational organizations in Sambalpur district.

== List of schools and colleges ==
Sl.No	Schools Name
1	N.G.Town High School, Sambalpur
2	Lad UGUP School
3	Gulujipali UGUP School, Gulujipali
4	Lassa UGUP School
5	Mahulpali TOUP School
6	Gurla TOUP School
7	Mahulchhapal TOUP School
8	Bauriguda TOUP School
9	Fasimal TOUP School
10	Boxma TOUP School
11	Kuchinda Govt High School
12	Paruabhadi High School
13	Kusumi High School
14	Fashimal High School
15	Jamankira High School
16	Sendpathar T R W High School
17	Kuchinda Girls High School
18	Bamra High School
19	Garposh High School
20	Bhojpur Girls High School
21	Bamra TF College
22	Kuntra GPR College
23	Kuchinda College
24	Sagara UGUP School
25	Ardabahal SSD Govt Girls' High School
26	Jamankira College, Jamankira
27	DB HS, Guchhara
28	Bhojpur Girls' High School
29	Rangiatikira Govt High School
30	Kutarimal PHigh School Kutarimal
31	Kechhupani SPS High School
32	Mundhenpali IGA High School Mundhenpali
33	Kenadhipa P High School, Kenadhipa
34	Subanpali High School
35	Kuturachuan High School
36	Jarabaga High School
37	Bankey Shibabilash High School
38	Tainsar TP High School
39	Mahulapali High School
40	Hadipali GP High School Hadipali
41	Tikilipada High School
42	Gunduruchuan Padmanav Govt High School
43	Kuludi VS High School
44	Bamra Bhagirathi Bidyalaya
45	G C High School, Rairakhol
46	Charmal High School, Charmal
47	Kadaligarh High School, kadaligarh
48	Tribanpur High School, Tribanpur
49	P M High School, J N Prasad
50	Sarapali High School, Sarapali
51	Daincha High School, Daincha
52	Panchakhunda High School, Kadobahali
53	Girish Chandrapur High School
54	Harijanpara Primary School, Rairakhol
55	Rampur Sadar P S Rairakhol
56	Charmal Pry School
57	Batgaon Primary School, Naktideul
58	Gogua Primary School, Naktideul
59	Smilipal UGUP School, Naktidoul
60	Hintasara UGUP School, Naktidoul
61	Luhapank TOME School
62	Badmal Toop School, Rairkhol
63	Gargadbahal UGUP School, Rairkhol
64	Brahamnipalli UGUP School
65	Bhimabhoi College, Rairakhol
66	Nakttidual College
67	Batgaon College, Batgaon
68	Jai jagganath College, R Badmal
69	Kisinda College, Kisinda
70	Loknath Baba High School Gargarhbhal
71	Gogua High School Gogua
72	Barbank High School Barbank
73	Jaganath High School Badmal
74	Ghosramal High School
75	Kisinda High School
76	Kadaligarh Pry School
77	Govt High School Mochibahai
78	Saledhip High School Saledhip
79	Dhama High School
80	Maneswar High School
81	Parmanpur High School
82	Janardan Pujari Govt High School, Sindurpank
83	Jujumura High School
84	Padhanpali High School
85	KGMN High School
86	Giripali Upgraded High School
87	Panchyat High School, Cosala
88	Chhiplima High School
89	Sasan High School
90	Government Boys' High School, Burla
91	Government Boys' High School, Hirakud
92	Lady Lewis Girls' High School
93	Pindapathar UGUP School
94	Novodayas Bidyalaya Gosala
95	St Joseph's Convent Higher Secondary School, Sambalpur
96	Mahulpali UGME School
97	Central School, Sambalpur
98	Gambharipank UGME School
99	University Campus UGME School
100	Batemura ME School
101	Mahamaadpur UGME School
102	Kudmahada UGMR School
103	Deogoan UGME School
104	Kobrapali ME Schooli
105	Dangerpada Nodal UP School
106	Bhandarimal UGME School
107	Nua Adhapada UGME School
108	Central School Sambalpur
109	Aurobindo School Pradhanpalli
110	Kankhinda ME School
111	MaaJhadeswari College Dhama
112	Themera High School
113	J K Sahu College Parmanpur
114	Madanabati Public School
115	Surajmal College, Rengali
116	Ramkali Devi Trust Higher Secondary School
117	Govt Women's College, Sambalpur
118	NSCB College Dhanupalli Sambalpur
119	G M Junior College, Sambalpur
120	CSB Zilla School, Sambalpur
121	Jaya Durga College Padiabahal
122	Municipal Girls' High School Sambalpur
123	Govt Nodal ME School Dhama
124	Mura High School
125	M Gunderpur High School
126	Talab High School, Talab
127	Sumati Behera High School, Chaurpur
128	UPS High School Chhamunda
129	CS Colony High School
130	Sahaspur High School
131	Baham Adivasi High School
132	Lapanaga High School
133	V S S High School Kabrapall
134	Govt Girls' HS, Balibandha Sambalpur
135	Temperkela Anchalik High School
136	DPA High School Rengoloi
137	Katarbanga High School
138	Budharaja High School
139	SDS Municipal Girls High School
140	Anchalik High School Tabala
141	BM Pattnaik ME School Sambalpur
142	JK High School Kinaloi
143	Samal Swari College
144	BVSS High School Kinaloi
145	UG High School Garmunda
146	UG Govt High School Keshapali
147	Deogaon High School
148	Laida High School
149	Gurunanak Public School sbp
150	Saraswati Sisu Mandir
151	Kilasama UG High School
152	A Kantapali High School
153	Kainsir High School
154	GN High School Batemura
155	Parmanpur Girls' High School
156	VSS High School Bargaon
157	A Girls High School Mirgamunda
158	Keshpali UG High School
159	Badsahir High School
160	A High School Dangarpada
161	N Barangamal GP High School Kulsar
162	J N High School JHankarpali
163	Kansar GP High School
164	JUjumara Girls High School
165	Govt Deaf & Dumb High School, Burla
166	Jyoti Vihar High School Burla
167	in/ DAV Public School Burla
168	Govt Girls High School Hirakud
169	Hindi High School Sambalpur
170	Shree Ganesh Girls' High School, Dhanupali
171	Khetarajpur High School Sambalpur
172	Police High School, Sambalpur
173	SB High School Gopalpali
174	Saraswati Vidya Mandir Dhanupali
175	Balika Vidyalaya Khetrajpur
176	Morden Public School Sonapali
177	RD High School Naktideul
178	NN High School Luhapank
179	AB High School Basajal
180	NR high School Rengali
181	Dhdropani High School, Rengali
182	CGK High School Jhankarpali
183	Rengali Girls High School
184	PHS Ramchandranagar High School Rengali
185	Laida Girls High School REngali
186	Pindapathar P High School Kuchinda
187	Bauriguda P High School, Kuchinda
188	Boxma High School Kuchinda
189	S A I School Kindra, Kuchinda
190	Kharsalmal High School Jamenkira
191	BD High School Badrama
192	Women's College Kuchinda
193	Parbati Giri College Mahulpali
194	Saraswati MV College Rairkhol
195	VSS Institute of Science Dhankauda
196	Women's College Kuchinda
197	NAC College Burla
198	Hirakud College Hirakud
199	Officers Colony PRY School Burla
200	Golgunda Pry School Burla
201	Mhatabnagar Pry School Burla
202	Goudapali Pry School
203	Central Line Pry School Burla
204	A Kantapali Pry School
205	Kirba UP School
206	Sadeipali UGME School
207	Dhankauda Pry School
208	Sason Pry School
209	Kinsir Pry School
210	Padhanpali Pry School
211	Sagunpali Pry school
212	Pitapali Pry School
213	Bhalubahal Pry School
214	Chhatrguda Pry School
215	Debeipali Pry School
216	Jogipali Pry School
217	Sankarma Pry School
218	Churpur Pry School
219	Mundoghat Pry School
220	Larpank Pry School
221	Silipathar, Pry School
222	Hirakud UGUP School
223	Huma Pry School
224	Chhachanpali, Pry School
225	Sahaspur Pry School
226	Naxapali, Pry School
227	Gambharkata, Pry School
228	Takba UGME School
229	Sindhurpank, Pry School
230	Tumesinga, Pry School
231	Kulta Nuapali UGME School
232	New balaranga, Pry School
233	M Subanpur, Pry School
234	Rasanpur, Pry School
235	Pilakandeipada NP School
236	Putibandh UGME School
237	Ainthapali, Pry School
238	Brooks Hill, Pry School
239	Remed, Pry School
240	Bhatra UGME School
241	Ashapali UGUP School
242	Dhanupali UGUP School
243	Bhoipali Pry School
244	Mundher, Pry School
245	Hero, Pry School
246	Ghnupali Pry School
247	Jhankarpali NU Pry School
248	Jayantpur ME School
249	Khairpali Pry School
250	Patuabahal Pry School
