= Kuchinda Assembly constituency =

Constituency of the Odisha legislative assembly in India

Coordinates: 21.75°N 84.35°E

Kuchinda
- Constituency No. 16 for the Odisha Legislative Assembly

Constituency details
- Country: India
- Region: East India
- State: Odisha
- Division: Northern Division
- District: Sambalpur
- Lok Sabha constituency: Sambalpur
- Established: 1967
- Total electors: 2,22,709 (Note: as on 2024) (Note: as data published by election commission)
- Reservation: ST

Member of Legislative Assembly
- 17th Odisha Legislative Assembly
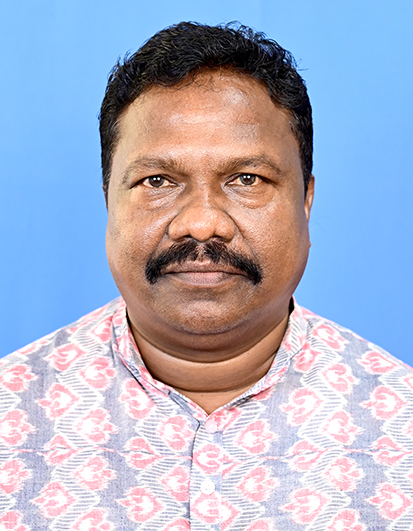
- Incumbent Rabi Narayan Naik
- Party: Bharatiya Janata Party
- Elected year: 2024

Kuchinda is a Vidhan Sabha constituency of Sambalpur district.

Area of this constituency includes Kuchinda, Kuchinda block, Bamra block and Jamankira block.

== Elected members ==
Vote share of winning candidates
2024	51.83%
2019	41.71%
2014	43.44%
2009	39.01%
2004	49.4%
2000	52.43%
1995	53.47%
1990	62.05%
1985	79.06%
1980	76.18%
1977	52.18%

Since its formation in 1967, 14 elections have been held till date.

List of members elected from Kuchinda constituency are:

Year	Member	Party
2024	Rabi Narayan Naik	Bharatiya Janata Party
2019	Kishore Chandra Naik	Biju Janata Dal
2014	Rabi Narayan Naik	Bharatiya Janata Party
2009	Rajendra Kumar Chhatria	Indian National Congress
2004	Rabi Narayan Naik	Bharatiya Janata Party
2000	Rabi Narayan Naik	Bharatiya Janata Party
1995	Panu Chandra Naik	Indian National Congress
1990	Brundaban Majhi	Janata Dal
1985	Jagateswar Mirdha	Indian National Congress
1980	Jagateswar Mirdha	Indian National Congress (I)
1977	Jagateswar Mirdha	Indian National Congress
1974	Jagateswar Mirdha	Indian National Congress
1971	Jagateswar Mirdha	Indian National Congress (R)
1967	Kanhai Singh	Swatantra Party

== Election results ==
=== 2024 ===
Voting was held on 25 May 2024 in the 3rd phase of the Odisha Assembly Election & 6th phase of the Indian General Election. The counting of votes was on 4 June 2024. In 2024 election, Bharatiya Janata Party candidate Rabi Narayan Naik defeated Biju Janata Dal candidate Rajendra Kumar Chhatria by a margin of 32,220 votes.

2024 Odisha Vidhan Sabha Election: Kuchinda
Party	Candidate	Votes	%	±%
BJP	Rabi Narayan Naik	95,716	51.83	▲12.14
BJD	Rajendra Kumar Chhatria	63,496	34.39	
INC	Kedarnath Bariha	21,285	11.53	
NOTA	None of the above	2,782	1.51	
Majority		32,220	17.44	
Turnout		1,84,661	82.92	
BJP gain from BJD				

=== 2019 ===
In the 2019 election, Biju Janata Dal candidate Kishore Chandra Naik defeated Bharatiya Janata Party candidate Rabi Narayan Naik by a margin of 3,508 votes.

2019 Odisha Vidhan Sabha Election: Kuchinda
Party	Candidate	Votes	%	±%
BJD	Kishore Chandra Naik	72,601	41.71	▲12.28
BJP	Rabi Narayan Naik	69,093	39.69	▼3.75
INC	Sovaram Padhan	24,795	14.24	▼6.57
NOTA	None of the above	2,805	1.61	▼0.22
Majority		3,508	2.02	
Turnout		174063	80.37	
BJD gain from BJP				

=== 2014 ===
In 2014 election, Bharatiya Janata Party candidate Rabi Narayan Naik defeated Biju Janata Dal candidate Bhubaneswar Kisan by a margin of 22,064 votes.

2014 Odisha Vidhan Sabha Election: Kuchinda
Party	Candidate	Votes	%	±%
BJP	Rabi Narayan Naik	68,409	43.44	▲14.53
BJD	Bhubaneswar Kisan	46,345	29.43	▲8.08
INC	Rajendra Kumar Chhatria	32,770	20.81	▼18.2
NOTA	None of the above	2,886	1.83	−
Majority		22,064	14.09	
Turnout		1,57,495	81.53	
Registered electors		1,93,175		
BJP gain from INC				

=== 2009 ===
In 2009 election, Indian National Congress candidate Rajendra Kumar Chhatria defeated Bharatiya Janata Party candidate Rabi Narayan Naik by a margin of 12,712 votes.

2009 Odisha Vidhan Sabha Election: Kuchinda
Party	Candidate	Votes	%	±%
INC	Rajendra Kumar Chhatria	49,112	39.01	−
BJP	Rabi Narayan Naik	36,400	28.91	−
BJD	Brundaban Majhi	26,885	21.35	−
Majority		12,712	10.10 (Note: % of total valid votes)	
Turnout		1,25,916	67.43	
INC gain from BJP				
