= Debesh =

Debesh is a given name. Notable people with the given name include:

- Debesh Chattopadhyay
- Debesh Roy
- Debesh Acharya
