= Ramesh Chandra Sai =

Indian politician

Member of Odisha Legislative Assembly
- In office 2019–2024
- Preceded by: Sanjeeb Kumar Sahoo
- Constituency: Athmallik

Personal details
- Political party: Biju Janata Dal
- Profession: Politician

Ramesh Chandra Sai is an Indian politician from Odisha. He was a Member of the Odisha Legislative Assembly from 2019, representing Athmallik Assembly constituency as a Member of the Biju Janata Dal.

== See also ==
- 2019 Odisha Legislative Assembly election
- Odisha Legislative Assembly
