= Gambharipank =

Village in Odisha, India

Coordinates: 21.508831°N 84.080246°E

Gambharipank is a village situated besides old Ranchi road in Sambalpur district in the Indian state of Odisha, India. The village comes under Kukudapali panchayat and Jujomura block.

== Demographics ==
Sambalpuri is the main language spoken here. The total population of the village is 1200.

Agriculture is the primary economy for the village.

== See also ==
- Sambalpuri language
