= Nitesh Ganga Deb =

Indian politician

Member of Indian Parliament (Lok Sabha)
- In office 23 May 2019 – 4 June 2024
- Preceded by: Nagendra Pradhan
- Succeeded by: Dharmendra Pradhan
- Constituency: Sambalpur

Member of Odisha Legislative Assembly
- In office 25 May 2014 – 22 May 2019
- Preceded by: Sanjeeb Kumar Pradhan
- Succeeded by: Subash Chandra Panigrahi
- Constituency: Deogarh

Member of Odisha Legislative Assembly
- In office 15 May 2004 – 19 May 2009
- Preceded by: Subash Chandra Panigrahi
- Succeeded by: Sanjeeb Kumar Pradhan
- Constituency: Deogarh

Personal details
- Party: Bharatiya Janata Party
- Spouse: Arundhati Devi
- Children: Naman Ganga Deb
- Profession: Politician

Nitesh Ganga Deb is an Indian politician. He was elected to the Lok Sabha, lower house of the Parliament of India from Sambalpur, Odisha in the 2019 Indian general election as a member of the Bharatiya Janata Party. He is also the current titular King of the former princely state of Bamra(modern Deogarh district) and head of Bamanda branch of Eastern Ganga Dynasty.

He was the MLA of Deogarh Constituency till 2019.
