= Bargarh Assembly constituency =

Constituency of the Odisha legislative assembly in India

Coordinates: 21.34°N 83.63°E

Bargarh
- Constituency No. 3 for the Odisha Legislative Assembly

Constituency details
- Country: India
- Region: East India
- State: Odisha
- Division: Northern Division
- District: Bargarh
- Lok Sabha constituency: Bargarh
- Established: 1951
- Total electors: 2,17,952 (Note: as on 2024) (Note: as data published by election commission)
- Reservation: None

Member of Legislative Assembly
- 17th Odisha Legislative Assembly
- Incumbent Ashwini Kumar Sarangi
- Party: Bharatiya Janata Party
- Elected year: 2024

Bargarh is an Assembly constituency of Bargarh district in Odisha State. It was established in 1951.

== Extent of Assembly Constituencies ==
- Bargarh Block
- Barpali Block: Katapali, Mahulpali, Kusanpuri, Lenda, Bagbadi, Baramkela and Kanbar GPs
- Bargarh Municipality.

== Elected members ==
Vote share of winning candidates
2024	46.34%
2019	46.48%
2014	40.67%
2009	40.38%
2004	42.10%
2000	63.43%
1998 (bypoll)	47.98%
1995	49.34%
1990	64.85%
1985	54.21%
1980	60.00%
1977	55.42%

Since its formation in 1951, 18 elections were held during till date including one bypoll in 1998. It was 2 member constituency for 1957 elections.

List of members elected from Bargarh constituency are:

Year	Member	Party
2024	Ashwini Kumar Sarangi	Bharatiya Janata Party
2019	Debesh Acharya	Biju Janata Dal
2014	Debesh Acharya	Biju Janata Dal
2009	Sadhu Nepak	Indian National Congress
2004	Ananda Acharya	Biju Janata Dal
2000	Ananda Acharya	Biju Janata Dal
1998 (bypoll) (Note: Resignation of Prasanna Acharya on his election to Lok Sabha)	Ananda Acharya	Biju Janata Dal
1995	Prasanna Acharya	Janata Dal
1990	Prasanna Acharya	Janata Dal
1985	Jadumani Pradhan	Indian National Congress
1980	Jadumani Pradhan	Indian National Congress (I)
1977	Nabin Kumar Pradhan	Janata Party
1974	Nabin Kumar Pradhan	Samyukta Socialist Party
1971	Chittaranjan Kar	Indian National Congress (R)
1967	Bharat Chandra Hota	Orissa Jana Congress
1961	Gananath Pradhan	Samyukta Socialist Party
1957 (Note: It was a 2 member constituency)	Nikunja Bihari Singh	Ganatantra Parishad
1957	Mahananda Bahadur	Ganatantra Parishad
1951	Tirthabasi Pradhan	Indian National Congress

== Election results ==
=== 2024 ===
Voting were held on 20 May 2024 in 2nd phase of Odisha Assembly Election & 5th phase of Indian General Election. Counting of votes was on 4 June 2024. In 2024 election, Bharatiya Janata Party candidate Ashwini Kumar Sarangi defeated Biju Janata Dal candidate Debesh Acharya by a margin of 4,772 votes.

2024 Odisha Vidhan Sabha Election: Bargarh
Party	Candidate	Votes	%	±%
BJP	Ashwini Kumar Sarangi	77,766	46.34	
BJD	Debesh Acharya	72,994	43.5	
INC	Nipon Kumar Dash	10,272	6.12	
NOTA	None of the above	1187	0.71	
Majority		4,772	2.84	
Turnout		1,67,820	77	
BJP gain from BJD				

=== 2019 ===
In 2019 election, Biju Janata Dal candidate Debesh Acharya defeated Bharatiya Janata Party candidate Ashwini Kumar Sarangi by a margin of 8,452 votes.

2019 Odisha Vidhan Sabha Election: Bargarh
Party	Candidate	Votes	%	±%
BJD	Debesh Acharya	75,133	46.48	▲5.81
BJP	Ashwini Kumar Sarangi	66,681	41.25	▲25.69
INC	Nipon Kumar Dash	16,305	10.09	▼21.53
NOTA	None of the above	1,790	1.11	−
Majority		8,452	5.22	
Turnout		1,61,640	72.84	
BJD hold				

=== 2014 ===
In 2014 election, Biju Janata Dal candidate Debesh Acharya defeated Indian National Congress candidate Sadhu Nepak by a margin of 13,204 votes.

2014 Odisha Vidhan Sabha Election: Bargarh
Party	Candidate	Votes	%	±%
BJD	Debesh Acharya	59,350	40.67	▲1.99
INC	Sadhu Nepak	46,146	31.62	▼8.76
BJP	Ashwini Kumar Sarangi	22,707	15.56	▲6.41
NOTA	None of the above	1,754	1.2	−
Majority		13,204	9.05	
Turnout		1,45,919	73.49	8.54
Registered electors		1,98,554		
BJD gain from INC				

=== 2009 ===
In 2009 election, Indian National Congress candidate Sadhu Nepak defeated Biju Janata Dal candidate Ananda Acharya by 1,969 votes.

2009 Odisha Vidhan Sabha Election: Bargarh
Party	Candidate	Votes	%	±%
INC	Sadhu Nepak	46,762	40.38	−
BJD	Ananda Acharya	44,793	38.68	−
BJP	Sureswar Satapathy	10,594	9.15	−
Majority		1,969	1.70 (Note: %of total valid votes)	
Turnout		1,16,825	64.95	
INC gain from BJD				
