= Rabi Narayan Naik =

Indian politician

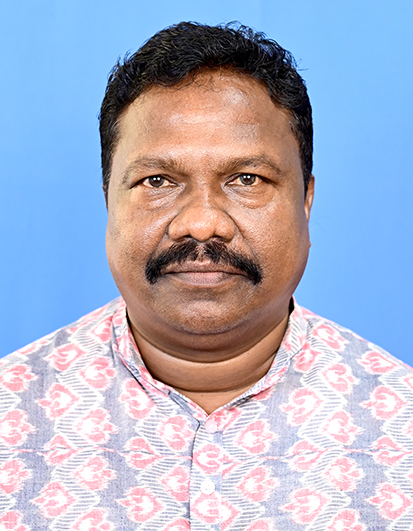

Minister of Rural Development Government of Odisha
- Incumbent
- Assumed office 12 June 2024
- Chief Minister: Mohan Charan Majhi
- Preceded by: Pritiranjan Gharai

Minister of Panchayati Raj & Drinking Water Government of Odisha
- Incumbent
- Assumed office 12 June 2024
- Chief Minister: Mohan Charan Majhi
- Preceded by: Pradip Kumar Amat

Member of the Odisha Legislative Assembly
- Incumbent
- Assumed office 2024
- Preceded by: Kishore Chandra Naik
- Constituency: Kuchinda (ST)
- In office 2014–2019
- Preceded by: Rajendra Kumar Chhatria
- Succeeded by: Kishore Chandra Naik
- Constituency: Kuchinda (ST)
- In office 2000–2009
- Preceded by: Panu Chandra Naik
- Succeeded by: Rajendra Kumar Chhatria
- Constituency: Kuchinda (ST)

Personal details
- Born: 30 June 1969 (age 56)
- Party: Bharatiya Janata Party
- Parent: Dasarath Naik (father)
- Education: Bachelor of Arts
- Profession: Farmer, Politician

Rabi Narayan Naik is an Indian politician and Minister of Rural Development, Panchayati Raj, Drinking Water in Government of Odisha. He is a Member of Odisha Legislative Assembly from Kuchinda assembly constituency of Sambalpur district.

He did his Higher Secondary Examination Certificate from the Council of Higher Secondary Education Odisha Bhubaneswar and graduated Kuchinda College Kuchinda in August 1991.

On 12 June 2024, he took oath along with Chief Minister Mohan Charan Majhitook oath in Janata Maidan, Bhubaneswar. Governor Raghubar Das administered their oath. Prime Minister Narendra Modi, Home Minister Amit Shah, Defense Minister Rajnath Singh, along with Chief Ministers of 10 BJP-ruled states were present.
