= Deogarh Assembly constituency =

Assembly constituency in Odisha

Coordinates: 21.54°N 84.73°E

Deogarh
- Constituency No. 19 for the Odisha Legislative Assembly

Constituency details
- Country: India
- Region: East India
- State: Odisha
- Division: Northern Division
- District: Deogarh
- Lok Sabha constituency: Sambalpur
- Established: 1957
- Total electors: 2,51,730 (Note: as on 2024) (Note: as data published by election commission)
- Reservation: None

Member of Legislative Assembly
- 17th Odisha Legislative Assembly
- Incumbent Romanch Ranjan Biswal
- Party: Biju Janata Dal
- Elected year: 2024

Deogarh is a Vidhan Sabha constituency of Debagarh district.

This constituency includes Debagarh, Tileibani block, Barkote block and Reamal block.

== Elected members ==
Vote share of winning candidates
2024	45.02%
2019	41.52%
2014	53.87%
2009	38.99%
2004	51.19%
2000	39.27%
1998 (bypoll)	55.34%
1995	42.78%
1990	72.38%
1985	45.80%
1980	43.63%
1977	60.62%

Since its formation in 1957, 17 elections were held till date including in one bypoll in 1998. It was a 2-member constituency for 1957.

List of members elected from Deogarh constituency are:

Year	Member	Party
2024	Romanch Ranjan Biswal	Biju Janata Dal
2019	Subash Chandra Panigrahi	Bharatiya Janata Party
2014	Nitesh Ganga Deb	Bharatiya Janata Party
2009	Sanjeeb Kumar Pradhan	Biju Janata Dal
2004	Nitesh Ganga Deb	Indian National Congress
2000	Subash Chandra Panigrahi	Bharatiya Janata Party
1998 (bypoll) (Note: Death of Pradipta Gangdev)	Subash Chandra Panigrahi	Bharatiya Janata Party
1995	Pradipta Gangdev	Janata Dal
1990	Pradipta Gangdev	Janata Dal
1985	Raja Kishore Pradhan	Indian National Congress
1980	Aswini Kumar Behera	Indian National Congress (I)
1977	Bhanuganga Tribhuban Deb	Janata Party
1974	Bhanuganga Tribhuban Deb	Swatantra Party
1971	Bhanuganga Tribhuban Deb	Swatantra Party
1967	Bhanuganga Tribhuban Deb	Swatantra Party
1961	Jayadev Thakur	Swatantra Party
1957 (Note: It was a 2 member constituency)	Rani Jyotimanjari Debi	Ganatantra Parishad
1957	Jayadev Thakur	Ganatantra Parishad

== Election results ==
=== 2024 ===
Voting were held on 25 May 2024 in 3rd phase of Odisha Assembly Election & 6th phase of Indian General Election. Counting of votes was on 4 June 2024. In 2024 election, Biju Janata Dal candidate Romanch Ranjan Biswal defeated Bharatiya Janata Party candidate Subash Chandra Panigrahi by a margin of 15, 792 votes.

2024 Odisha Vidhan Sabha Election, Deogarh
Party	Candidate	Votes	%	±%
BJD	Romanch Ranjan Biswal	89,074	45.02	▲7.46
BJP	Subash Chandra Panigrahi	73,282	37.03	▼4.49
INC	Sem Hembram	28,279	14.29	▼1.03
NOTA	None of the above	2,767	1.40	▲0.67
Majority		15,792		
Turnout		1,97,873	78.61	
BJD gain from BJP				

=== 2019 ===
In 2019 election, Bharatiya Janata Party candidate Subash Chandra Panigrahi defeated Biju Janata Dal candidate Romanch Ranjan Biswal by a margin of 7,106 votes.

2019 Vidhan Sabha Election, Deogarh
Party	Candidate	Votes	%	±%
BJP	Subash Chandra Panigrahi	74,355	41.52	▼12.35
BJD	Romanch Ranjan Biswal	67,249	37.56	▲6.97
INC	Uma Shankar Sahu	27,426	15.32	▲6.42
NOTA	None of the above	1,313	0.73	048
Majority		7,106	3.96	
Turnout		1,79,063	74.7	
BJP hold				

=== 2014 ===
In 2014 election, Bharatiya Janata Party candidate Nitesh Ganga Deb defeated Biju Janata Dal candidate Anita Pradhan by a margin of 38,739 votes.

2014 Vidhan Sabha Election, Deogarh
Party	Candidate	Votes	%	±%
BJP	Nitesh Ganga Deb	89,636	53.87	▲30.15
BJD	Anita Pradhan	50,897	30.59	▼8.4
INC	Sem Hemram	14,809	8.9	▼22.4
NOTA	None of the above	2011	1.21	
Majority		38,739	23.28	
Turnout		1,66,394	78.97	7.89
Registered electors		2,10,712		
BJP gain from BJD				

=== 2009 ===
In 2009 election, Biju Janata Dal candidate Sanjeeb Kumar Pradhan defeated Indian National Congress candidate Nitesh Ganga Deb by a margin of 10,705 votes.

2009 Vidhan Sabha Election, Deogarh
Party	Candidate	Votes	%	±%
BJD	Sanjeeb Kumar Pradhan	54,267	38.99	−
INC	Nitesh Ganga Deb	43,561	31.30	−
BJP	Subash Chandra Panigrahi	33,009	23.72	−
Majority		10,705	7.69 (Note: %of total valid votes)	
Turnout		1,39,257	71.08	
BJD gain from INC				
