= Athmallik Assembly constituency =

Constituency of the Odisha legislative assembly in India

Coordinates: 20.72°N 84.54°E

Athmallik
- Constituency No. 63 for the Odisha Legislative Assembly

Constituency details
- Country: India
- Region: East India
- State: Odisha
- Division: Northern Division
- District: Angul
- Lok Sabha constituency: Sambalpur
- Established: 1951
- Total electors: 2,09,796 (Note: as on 2024) (Note: as data published by election commission)
- Reservation: None

Member of Legislative Assembly
- 17th Odisha Legislative Assembly
- Incumbent Nalini Kanta Pradhan
- Party: Biju Janata Dal
- Elected year: 2024

Athmallik (Sl. No.: 63) is a Vidhan Sabha constituency of Angul district, Odisha.

This constituency includes Athmallik, Athmallik block, Kishorenagar block and 9 GPs (Antulia, Saradhapur, Matiasahi, Manikajodi, Jagannathpur, Tainsi, Kothabhuin, Tikarpada and Purunakote) of Angul block.

== Elected members ==
Vote share of winning candidates
| 2024 | 52.35% |
| 2019 | 53.56% |
| 2014 | 44.85% |
| 2009 | 48.46% |
| 2004 | 45.77% |
| 2000 | 59.77% |
| 1995 | 47.64% |
| 1990 | 53.84% |
| 1985 | 48.06% |
| 1980 | 60.32% |
| 1977 | 50.48% |

Since its formation in 1951, 18 elections were held till date including in one bypoll in 1955.

List of members elected from Athmallik constituency are:

| Year | Member | Party |
|---|---|---|
| 2024 | Nalini Kanta Pradhan | Biju Janata Dal |
| 2019 | Ramesh Chandra Sai | Biju Janata Dal |
| 2014 | Sanjeeb Kumar Sahoo | Biju Janata Dal |
| 2009 | Sanjeeb Kumar Sahoo | Biju Janata Dal |
| 2004 | Nagendra Kumar Pradhan | Biju Janata Dal |
| 2000 | Nagendra Kumar Pradhan | Biju Janata Dal |
| 1995 | Amarnath Pradhan | Indian National Congress |
| 1990 | Nagendra Kumar Pradhan | Janata Dal |
| 1985 | Amarnath Pradhan | Indian National Congress |
| 1980 | Bhajaman Behera | Indian National Congress (I) |
| 1977 | Balakrushna Patnaik | Janata Party |
| 1974 | Bhajaman Behera | Indian National Congress |
| 1971 | Rajkishore Pradhan | Utkal Congress |
| 1967 | Surendra Pradhan | Samyukta Socialist Party |
| 1961 | Khetra Mohan Panigrahi | Swatantra Party |
| 1957 | Khetra Mohan Panigrahi | Ganatantra Parishad |
| 1955 (bypoll) (Note: Resignation of Dwitiya Roul) | Raja Kishore Chandra Deo | Indian National Congress |
| 1951 | Dwitiya Roul | Independent politician |

== Election results ==
=== 2024 ===
Voting were held on 25 May 2024 in 3rd phase of Odisha Assembly Election & 6th phase of Indian General Election. Counting of votes was on 4 June 2024. In 2024 election, Biju Janata Dal candidate Nalini Kanta Pradhan defeated Bharatiya Janata Party candidate Sanjeeb Kumar Sahoo by a margin of 16,153 votes.

2024 Odisha Vidhan Sabha Election, Athmallik
| Party | Candidate | Votes | % | ±% |
|---|---|---|---|---|
| BJD | Nalini Kanta Pradhan | 93,957 | 52.35 | ▼1.21 |
| BJP | Sanjeeb Kumar Sahoo | 77,804 | 43.35 | ▲19.09 |
| INC | Himanshu Shekhar Chaulia | 5,126 | 2.86 | ▼16.34 |
| NOTA | None of the above | 1,631 | 0.91 | ▼0.15 |
| Majority | | 16,153 | 9.00 | |
| Turnout | | 1,79,491 | 85.56 | |
| BJD hold | | | | |

=== 2019 ===
In 2019 election, Biju Janata Dal candidate Ramesh Chandra Sai defeated Bharatiya Janata Party candidate Bhagirathi Pradhan by a margin of 47,184 votes.

2019 Vidhan Sabha Election, Athmallik
| Party | Candidate | Votes | % | ±% |
|---|---|---|---|---|
| BJD | Ramesh Chandra Sai | 86,254 | 53.56 | ▲8.71 |
| BJP | Bhagirathi Pradhan | 39,070 | 24.26 | ▲8.33 |
| INC | Bijayananda Chaulia | 30,925 | 19.20 | ▼11.8 |
| NOTA | None of the above | 1,717 | 1.06 | − |
| Majority | | 47,184 | 28.59 | 14.73 |
| Turnout | | 1,65,035 | 79.56 | ▼0.13 |
| Registered electors | | 2,01,661 | | |
| BJD hold | | | | |

=== 2014 ===
In 2014 election, Biju Janata Dal candidate Sanjeeb Kumar Sahoo defeated Indian National Congress candidate Surendra Kumar Pradhan by a margin of 19,533 votes.

2014 Vidhan Sabha Election, Athmallik
| Party | Candidate | Votes | % | ±% |
|---|---|---|---|---|
| BJD | Sanjeeb Kumar Sahoo | 63,226 | 44.85 | − |
| INC | Surendra Kumar Pradhan | 43,693 | 31.00 | − |
| BJP | Bhagirathi Pradhan | 22,463 | 15.93 | − |
| NOTA | None of the above | 1,450 | 1.03 | − |
| Majority | | 19,533 | 13.86 | |
| Turnout | | 1,40,967 | 79.69 | |
| Registered electors | | 1,76,891 | | |
| BJD hold | | | | |

=== 2009 ===
In 2009 election, Biju Janata Dal candidate Sanjeeb Kumar Sahoo defeated Indian National Congress candidate Mousumi Pradhan by a margin of 18,981 votes.

2009 Vidhan Sabha Election, Athmallik
| Party | Candidate | Votes | % | ±% |
|---|---|---|---|---|
| BJD | Sanjeeb Kumar Sahoo | 61,388 | 48.86 | − |
| INC | Mousumi Pradhan | 42,407 | 33.75 | − |
| BJP | Bhagirathi Pradhan | 12,674 | 10.09 | − |
| Majority | | 18,981 | 15.11 (Note: %of total valid votes) | − |
| Turnout | | 1,25,672 | 72.67 | − |
| BJD hold | | | | |
