= Sudarshan Haripal =

Indian politician

Member of the Odisha Legislative Assembly
- Incumbent
- Assumed office 2024
- Preceded by: Nauri Nayak
- Constituency: Rengali

Personal details
- Born: Sambalpur
- Party: Biju Janata Dal
- Spouse: Nisha Haripal
- Education: Sambalpur University
- Profession: Politician; Social Worker
- Website: {{https://assembly.odisha.gov.in/MemberofAssembly.aspx?filterType=constituency&filterValue=Rengali+-++(++Sambalpur+%2C+Odisha+)}}

Sudarshan Haripal (born 15 May 1981) is an Indian politician from Odisha. He is an MLA from Rengali Assembly constituency in Sambalpur district. He won the 2024 Odisha Legislative Assembly election representing the Biju Janata Dal.

== Early life and education ==
Haripal is from Rengali, Sambalpur district, Odisha. He is the son of Debaraj Haripal. He completed his Class 12 at Jyoti Vihar Junior College, Burla in 2003. He used to do odd jobs including sticking posters. In 2012, to repair a pump in his locality, he approached many officials but the work was done only after a politician intervened. Then he decided to take up politics.

== Career ==
Haripal won from Rengali Assembly constituency representing the Biju Janata Dal in the 2024 Odisha Legislative Assembly election. He polled 73,420 votes and defeated his nearest rival, Nauri Nayak of the Bharatiya Janata Party, by a margin of 3,212 votes.
