= Natabar Pandey =

Indian politician

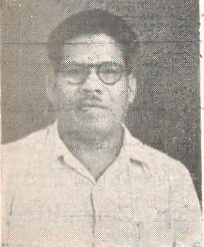
- Natabar Pandey in 1952

Member of the Lok Sabha
- Incumbent
- Assumed office 1952
- Constituency: Sambalpur

Personal details
- Born: 5 April 1908 India
- Spouse: Usarani (married in 1928)
- Children: 1 daughter
- Education: Sambalpur Zilla School, Secondary Training School, Cuttack
- Profession: Politician; Teacher; Homeopath

Natabar Pandey (5 April 1908 – ?) was an Indian politician. He represented the Sambalpur constituency in the 1st Lok Sabha (lower house of the parliament of India) elected in 1952.

== Early life and education ==
Pandey was born on 5 April 1908, son of Parashar Pandey. He studied at Sambalpur Zilla School and Secondary Training School, Cuttack. He married Usarani in 1928, and the couple had one daughter. From 1929 to 1938 Pandey worked as high school teacher in Sundargarh. In 1938 he renounced his teaching job and began studying homeopathy at the Institute of Homoeopathy at Dathe—Kathiawar, obtaining Ph.B. and Sc.B. degrees in Homeopathy. He served as organising secretary of the Orissa Boy Scouts Association from 1939 to 1941.

== Career ==
Pandey was the president of the Gangpur State Praja Mandal and a member the executive xommittee of the Orissa Regional Council, and was linked to the All India States' People's Conference during 1946-1947. In 1948 he became a member of the Orissa State Assembly, as served as chief whip in the assembly. However, he resigned from the assembly and founded the Union Movement. From 1948 to 1950 Pandey served as president of the Eastern States People Convention. During agitations of the Eastern States People Convention, he was arrested by agents of the government of Orissa. Once released from jail he founded the Koshal Utkal Praja Parishad, which eventually evolved into the All India Ganatantra Parishad. He became a member of the Working Committee of the party.

In 1952 Pandey was elected to the first Lok Sabha from Sambalpur, obtaining 70,622 votes (54.97%). Pandey was one of six AIGP members from Orissa in the first Lok Sabha. As a parliamentarian, Pandey lobbied for abolition of Agricultural Income Tax. He resigned his seat in the Lok Sabha in 1956.
