= Rengali Assembly constituency =

Constituency of the Odisha legislative assembly in India

Coordinates: 21.63°N 84.04°E

Rengali
- Constituency No. 16 for the Odisha Legislative Assembly

Constituency details
- Country: India
- Region: East India
- State: Odisha
- Division: Northern Division
- District: Sambalpur
- Lok Sabha constituency: Sambalpur
- Established: 2009
- Total electors: 1,96,975 (Note: as on 2024) (Note: as data published by election commission)
- Reservation: SC

Member of Legislative Assembly
- 17th Odisha Legislative Assembly
- Incumbent Sudarshan Haripal
- Party: Biju Janata Dal
- Elected year: 2024

Rengali is a Vidhan Sabha constituency of Sambalpur district, Odisha.

This constituency includes Rengali block, Dhankauda block and 10 Gram panchayats (Gunderpur, Batemura, Bhikampur, Maneswar, Mathpali, Nuatihura, Parmanpur, Sindurpank, Tabala and Themra) of Maneswar block.

The constituency was formed in the 2008 Delimitation and went for polls in 2009 election.

== Elected members ==
Vote share of winning candidates
2024	45.45%
2019	47.56%
2014	35.78%
2009	31.45%

Since its formation in 2009, 4 elections were held till date.

List of members elected from Rengali constituency are:

Year	Member	Party
2024	Sudarshan Haripal	Biju Janata Dal
2019	Nauri Nayak	Bharatiya Janata Party
2014	Ramesh Patua	Biju Janata Dal
2009	Duryodhan Gardia	Indian National Congress

== Election results ==
=== 2024 ===
Voting were held on 25 May 2024 in 3rd phase of Odisha Assembly Election & 6th phase of Indian General Election. Counting of votes was on 4 June 2024. In 2024 election, Biju Janata Dal candidate Sudarshan Haripal defeated Bharatiya Janata Party candidate Then Sitting Mla Nauri Nayak by a margin of 3,212 votes.

2024 Odisha Vidhan Sabha Election, Rengali
Party	Candidate	Votes	%	±%
BJD	Sudarshan Haripal	73,420	45.45	▲2.22
BJP	Nauri Nayak	70,208	43.46	▼4.10
INC	Dillip Kumar Duria	9,365	5.80	▼0.49
NOTA	None of the above	1,820	1.13	▼0.47
Majority		3,212		
Turnout		1,61,528	82	
BJD gain from BJP				

=== 2019 ===
In 2019 election, Bharatiya Janata Party candidate Nauri Nayak defeated Biju Janata Dal candidate Reena Tanty by a margin of 6,743 votes.

2019 Odisha Legislative Assembly election: Rengali
Party	Candidate	Votes	%	±%
BJP	Nauri Nayak	74,077	47.56	▲13.16
BJD	Reena Tanty	67334	43.23	▲7.45
INC	Balakrushna Rohidas	9799	6.29	▼17.46
Independent	Bidyadhar Pandav	1154	0.74	−
Independent	Subal Singh	888	0.57	−
NOTA	None of the above	2497	1.6	▼0.06
Majority		6743	4.33	
Turnout		155749	80.24	
BJP gain from BJD				

=== 2014 ===
In 2014 election, Biju Janata Dal candidate Ramesh Patua defeated Bharatiya Janata Party candidate Nauri Nayak by a margin of 1,830 votes.

2014 Vidhan Sabha Election, Rengali
Party	Candidate	Votes	%	±%
BJD	Ramesh Patua	47,210	35.78	▲20.67
BJP	Nauri Nayak	45,380	34.4	▲22.8
INC	Duryodhan Gardia	31,335	23.75	▼7.7
NOTA	None of the above	2,191	1.66	−
Majority		1,830	1.38	−
Turnout		1,31,935	78.11	14.61
Registered electors		1,68,910		
BJD gain from INC				

=== 2009 ===
In 2009 election, Indian National Congress candidate Duryodhan Gardia defeated Independent candidate M. B. Pyariraj by a margin of 13,784 votes.

2009 Vidhan Sabha Election, Rengali
Party	Candidate	Votes	%	±%
INC	Duryodhan Gardia	32,656	31.45	−
Independent	M. B. Pyariraj	18,872	18.17	−
BJD	Sanatan Bisi	15,694	15.11	−
Independent	Nauri Nayak	12,321	11.86	−
BJP	Debanand Bhusagar	12,044	11.60	−
Majority		13,784	13.27 (Note: % of total valid votes)	
Turnout		1,03,896	63.50	
INC win (new seat)				
