= Kuchinda =

- Town
- Location in Odisha, India Kuchinda (India)
- Coordinates: 21.73°N 84.35°E
- Country: India
- State: Odisha
- District: Sambalpur

Government
  - Chairperson, Kuchinda N.A.C.: Smt. Rebati Balua
- Elevation: 220 m (720 ft)

Population (2011)
  - Total: 15,576

Languages
  - Official: Odia
- Time zone: UTC+5:30 (IST)
- PIN: 768222
- Telephone code: 06642
- Vehicle registration: OD15 (Sambalpur); Nearest RTO; OD23 (Jharsuguda); OD28 (Deogarh)
- Website: nackuchinda.in

Kuchinda is the town and a notified area council in Sambalpur district in the Indian state of Odisha. It is located about 80 km (49.71 mi) from the district headquarters of Sambalpur, and about 48 km (29.83 mi) away from Jharsuguda. Kuchinda is famous for its "Dushera". Kuchinda is also famous for the Gudguda waterfall. Most of the people of Kuchinda sub-division depends on farming. Kuchinda is more of a tribal area.

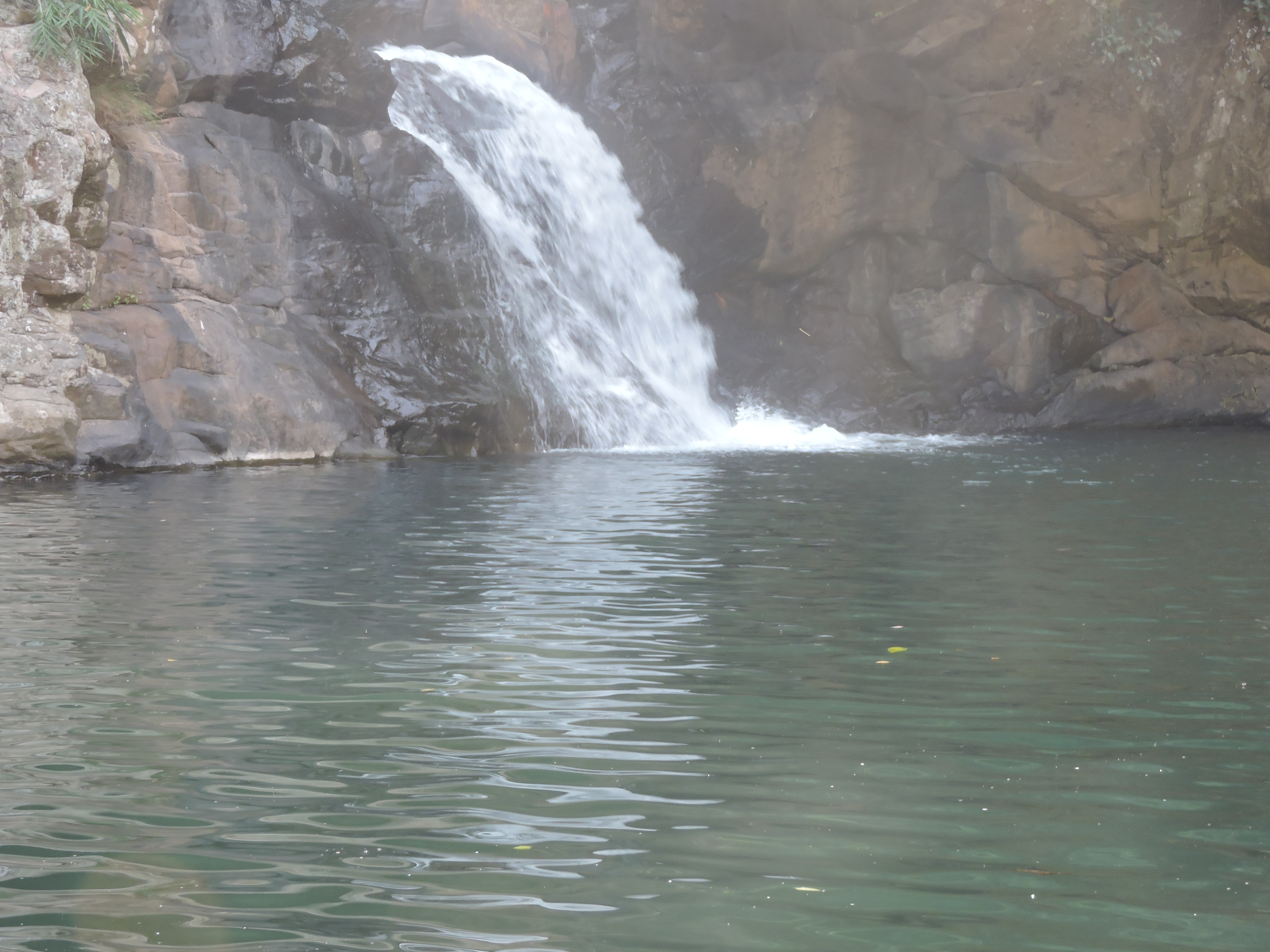
Gudguda Waterfall

== Geography ==
It has an average elevation of 220 metres (721 feet). National Highway 200 passes through the city. Nearby residential areas include Saida, Ghosa, Mantrimunda, Lad, Boxma, Mahuldihi, Kira, Bandubas, Satkama and Lingapali.

== Demographics ==
As of 2011 census, Kuchinda had a population of 15,576. Males constituted 51% of the population and females 49%. Kuchinda has an average literacy rate of 66%, higher than the national average of 59.5%: Male literacy is 71% and female literacy is 60%. 12% of the population is under 6 years of age. Purunapani is the most educated village of western Odisha, which is situated in Kuchinda block.

== Transport ==
Airports: Jharsuguda Airport - 48 km (29.83 mi)

Railway stations: Bagdihi (Odisha, Jharsuguda, Laikera 31 km), Jharsuguda junction 48 km, Jharsuguda, Panpali (Odisha, Jharsuguda, Kirmira 32 km) Rourkela (Odisha, Sundargarh 83 km)

== Politics ==
After 2024 election the MLA from Kuchinda (ST) Assembly Constituency is Rabi Narayan Naik of BJP.

Kuchinda is part of Sambalpur (Lok Sabha constituency). And Dharmendra Pradhan is the Member of Parliament of Sambalpur lok sabha constituency.
