= Rairakhol Assembly constituency =

Constituency of the Odisha legislative assembly in India

Coordinates: 21.07°N 84.34°E

Rairakhol
- Constituency No. 18 for the Odisha Legislative Assembly

Constituency details
- Country: India
- Region: East India
- State: Odisha
- Division: Northern Division
- District: Sambalpur
- Lok Sabha constituency: Sambalpur
- Established: 1961
- Total electors: 2,02,639 (Note: as on 2024) (Note: as data published by election commission)
- Reservation: None

Member of Legislative Assembly
- 17th Odisha Legislative Assembly
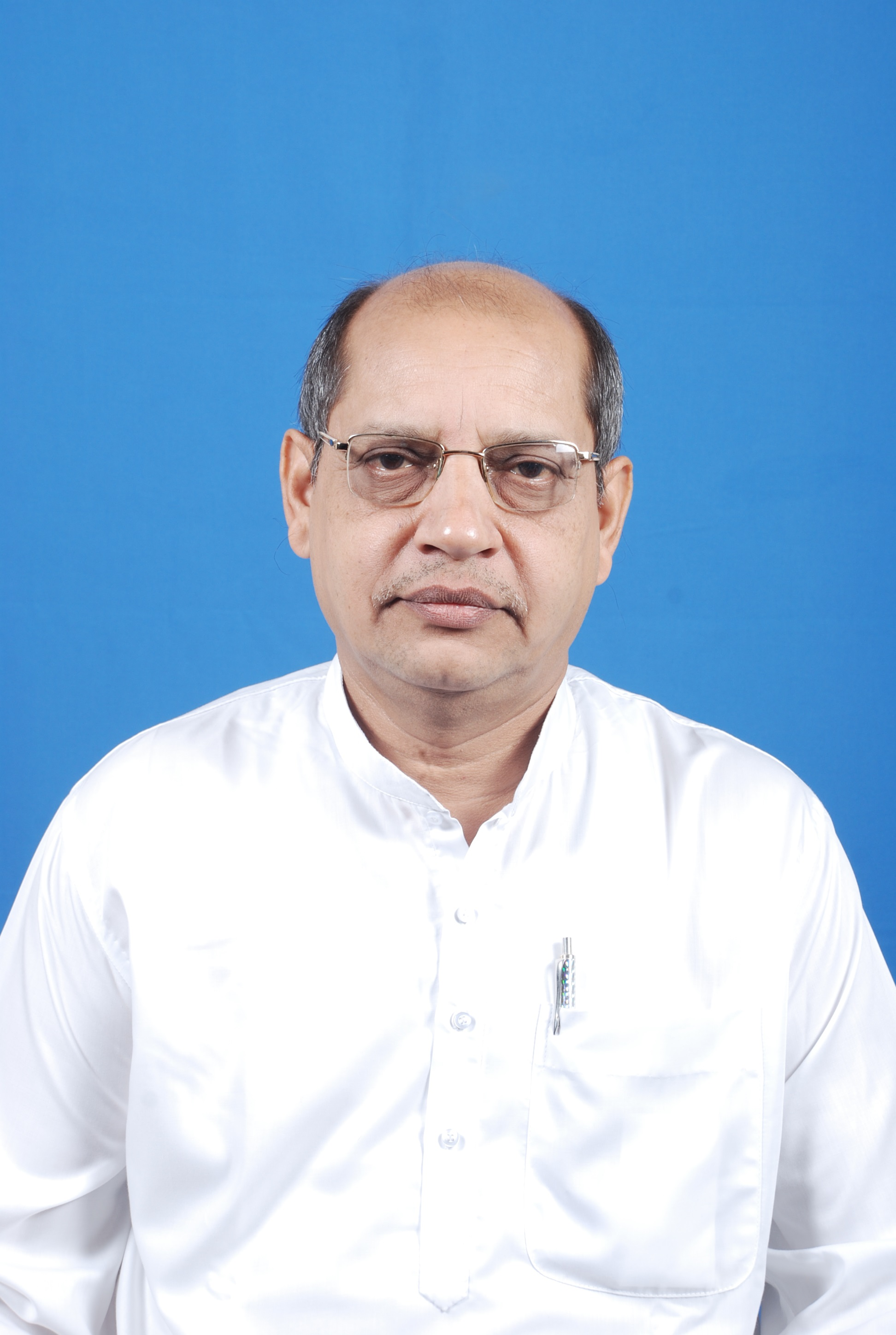
- Incumbent Prasanna Acharya
- Party: Biju Janata Dal
- Elected year: 2024

Rairakhol is a Vidhan Sabha constituency of Sambalpur district, Odisha.

This constituency includes Rairakhol, Rairakhol block, Jujomura block, Naktideul block and 7GPs (Deogaon, Dakara, Dhama, Huma, Bargaon, Sahaspur and Baduapali) of Maneswar block.

== Elected members ==
Vote share of winning candidates
2024	38.23%
2019	37.94%
2014	39.96%
2009	35.07%
2004	38.55%
2001 (bypoll)	50.48%
2000	31.00%
1995	40.86%
1990	60.80%
1985	58.72%
1980	62.82%
1977	54.99%

Since its formation in 1961, 16 elections were held till date including one bypoll in 2001.

List of members elected from Rairakhol constituency are:

Year	Member	Party
2024	Prasanna Acharya	Biju Janata Dal
2019	Rohit Pujari	Biju Janata Dal
2014	Rohit Pujari	Biju Janata Dal
2009	Prasanna Acharya	Biju Janata Dal
2004	Sanatan Bisi	Biju Janata Dal
2001 (bypoll) (Note: Death of Durjodhan Sohela)	Sanatan Bisi	Biju Janata Dal
2000	Durjodhan Sohela	Biju Janata Dal
1995	Abhimanyu Kumar (Kumbhar)	Indian National Congress
1990	Basanta Kumar Mahananda	Janata Dal
1985	Abhimanyu Kumar (Kumbhar)	Indian National Congress
1980	Abhimanyu Kumar (Kumbhar)	Indian National Congress (I)
1977	Basanta Kumar Mahananda	Janata Party
1974	Basanta Kumar Mahananda	Utkal Congress
1971	Abhimanyu Kumar (Kumbhar)	Indian National Congress (R)
1967	Bhikhari Suna	Swatantra Party
1961	Bhanuganga Tribhuban Deb	Swatantra Party

== Election results ==
=== 2024 ===
Voting were held on 25 May 2024 in 3rd phase of Odisha Assembly Election & 6th phase of Indian General Election. Counting of votes was on 4 June 2024. In 2024 election, Biju Janata Dal candidate Prasanna Acharya defeated Bharatiya Janata Party candidate Debendra Mohapatra by a margin of 10,993 votes.

2024 Odisha Vidhan Sabha Election, Rairakhol
Party	Candidate	Votes	%	±%
BJD	Prasanna Acharya	61,716	38.23	▲0.29
BJP	Debendra Mohapatra	56,756	35.16	▲7.24
INC	Assaf Ali Khan	37,579	23.28	▼4.94
NOTA	None of the above	1,826	1.13	▲0.17
Majority		4,960		
Turnout		1,61,424	79.66	
BJD hold				

=== 2019 ===
In 2019 election, Biju Janata Dal candidate Rohit Pujari defeated Indian National Congress candidate Assaf Ali Khan by a margin of 14,632 votes.

2019 Vidhan Sabha Election, Rairakhol
Party	Candidate	Votes	%	±%
BJD	Rohit Pujari	57,111	37.94	▼2.02
INC	Assaf Ali Khan	42,479	28.22	▼2.90
BJP	Debendra Mohapatra	42,027	27.92	▲6.00
NOTA	None of the above	1725	1.15	
Majority		14,632	9.72	
Turnout		150524	70.59	
BJD hold				

=== 2014 ===
In 2014 election, Biju Janata Dal candidate Rohit Pujari defeated Indian National Congress candidate Assaf Ali Khan by a margin of 11,909 votes.

2014 Vidhan Sabha Election, Rairakholl
Party	Candidate	Votes	%	±%
BJD	Rohit Pujari	53,849	39.96	▲4.89
INC	Assaf Ali Khan	41,940	31.12	▲5.13
BJP	Pratap Kumar Pradhan	29,544	21.92	▲4.05
NOTA	None of the above	1,298	0.96	−
Majority		11,909	8.83	
Turnout		1,34,764	77.22	13.47
Registered electors		1,74,526		
BJD hold				

=== 2009 ===
In 2009 election, Biju Janata Dal candidate Prasanna Acharya defeated Indian National Congress candidate Assaf Ali Khan by a margin of 9,764 votes.

2009 Vidhan Sabha Election, Rairakhol
Party	Candidate	Votes	%	±%
BJD	Prasanna Acharya	37,718	35.07	−
INC	Assaf Ali Khan	27,954	25.99	−
BJP	Sarat Chandra Sahu	19,217	17.87	−
Majority		9,764	9.08 (Note: % of total valid votes)	
Turnout		1,07,573	63.75	
BJD hold				
