= Rohit Pujari =

Indian politician

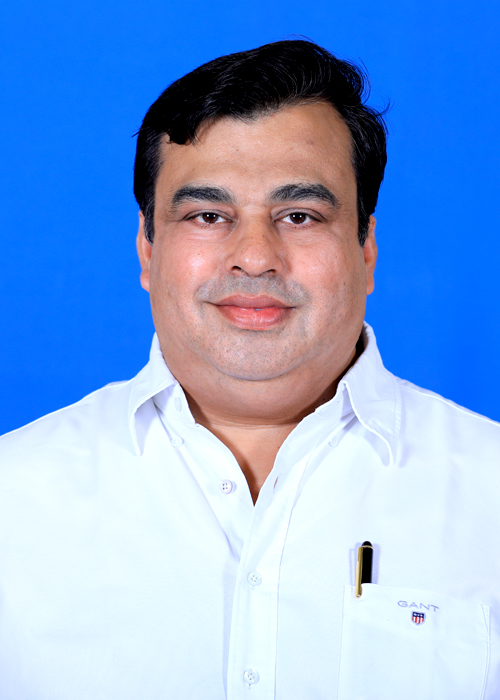

Member of Odisha Legislative Assembly
- In office 2014–2024
- Preceded by: Prasanna Acharya
- Constituency: Rairakhol

Minister of Higher Education Government of Odisha
- In office 2019 – 4 June 2022
- Preceded by: Pradeep Kumar Panigrahi
- Succeeded by: Arun kumar sahoo

President of the Odisha Pradesh Youth Congress
- In office 2006-2009

Personal details
- Born: 29 December 1973 (age 52)
- Party: Biju Janata Dal (Since 2009)
- Other political affiliations: Indian National Congress (Before 2009)
- Children: 2
- Education: Birla Institute of Technology, Mesra
- Profession: Politician
- Awards: Times Power Man Of The Year 2019

Rohit Pujari is an Indian politician from Odisha. He represented Rairakhol in Odisha Legislative Assembly from 2014 to 2024. He is a member of the Biju Janata Dal. He is former Minister of Higher Education Government of Odisha.

He also served as Deputy Chief whip, Odisha Government from 2014 to 2021. Pujari also served as chairman, Odisha Lift Irrigation Corporation from 2009 to 2014. Prior to joining BJD in 2009, he was the president of the Odisha Pradesh Youth Congress and AICC member.Rohit Pujari
