= Nalini Kanta Pradhan =

Indian politician

Member of Odisha Legislative Assembly
- Incumbent
- Assumed office 4 June 2024
- Preceded by: Ramesh Chandra Sai
- Constituency: Athmallik

Personal details
- Party: Biju Janata Dal
- Profession: Politician

Nalini Kanta Pradhan is an Indian politician who was elected to the Odisha Legislative Assembly from Athmallik as a member of the Biju Janata Dal.
