= Subash Chandra Panigrahi =

Indian politician

Member of Odisha Legislative Assembly
- In office 2019–2024
- Constituency: Deogarh

Personal details
- Party: Bharatiya Janata Party
- Profession: Politician

Subash Chandra Panigrahi is an Indian politician from Odisha. He was a Member of the Odisha Legislative Assembly from 2019, representing Deogarh Assembly constituency as a Member of the Bharatiya Janata Party.

== See also ==
- 2019 Odisha Legislative Assembly election
- Odisha Legislative Assembly
