= Krupasindhu Bhoi =

Politician from Odisha, India

Krupasindhu Bhoi (born 5 August 1942 Village Tampar Sambalpur district (Orissa)) was member of 7th Lok Sabha from Sambalpur (Lok Sabha constituency) in Odisha state, India.

He was elected to 8th, 10th and 11th Lok Sabha from Sambalpur .

He was an avid social worker.
