= Debesh Acharya =

Indian politician

Member of Odisha Legislative Assembly
- In office 2014–2024
- Preceded by: Sadhu Nepak
- Succeeded by: Ashwini Kumar Sarangi
- Constituency: Bargarh

Personal details
- Political party: Biju Janata Dal
- Profession: Politician

Debesh Acharya is an Indian politician from Odisha. He is a Member of the Odisha Legislative Assembly from 2014, representing Bargarh Assembly constituency as a Member of the Biju Janata Dal.

== See also ==
- 2019 Odisha Legislative Assembly election
- Odisha Legislative Assembly
