= Sambalpur district =

- District of Odisha
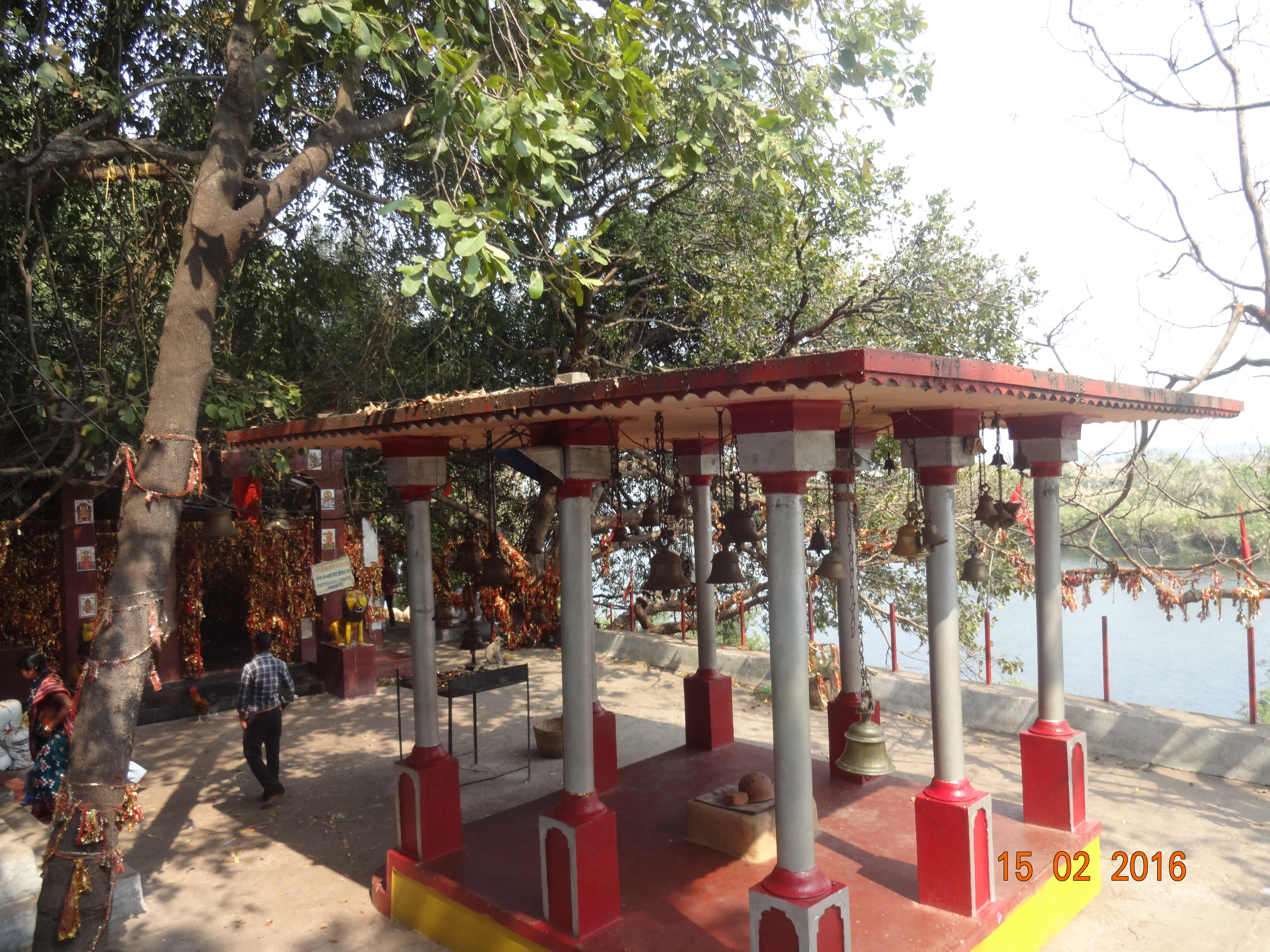
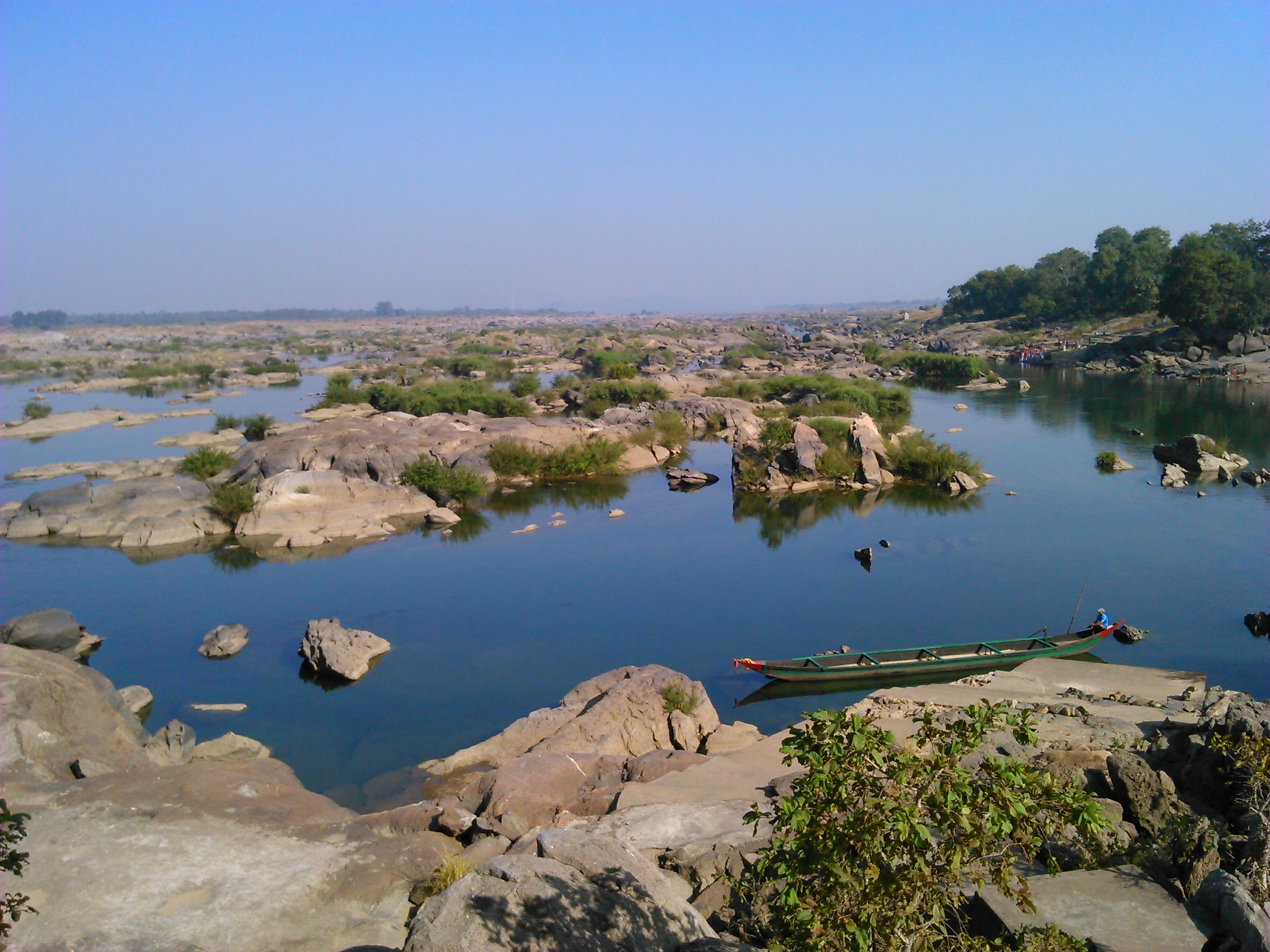
- Top: Ghanteswari Temple; Bottom: Mahanadi near Huma

- Location in Odisha
- Sambalpur district
- Coordinates: 21.466°N 83.983°E
- Country: India
- State: Odisha
- Headquarters: Sambalpur

Government
  - Collector & District Magistrate: Siddheshwar Baliram Bondar, IAS
  - Divisional Forest Officer Cum Wildlife Warden: Sanjeet Kumar, IFS
  - Superintendent of Police: Kanwar Vishal Singh, IPS

Area
  - Total: 6,702 km^{2} (2,588 sq mi)

Population (2011)
  - Total: 1,041,099
  - Density: 122/km^{2} (320/sq mi)

Languages
  - Official: Odia, English
  - Local: Sambalpuri, Kurukh, Munda, Kharia
- Time zone: UTC+5:30 (IST)
- PIN: 768 xxx
- Telephone code: 663
- Vehicle registration: OD-15, OR-15(till 2012)
- Sex ratio: 1.031 ♂/♀
- Literacy: 67.25%
- Lok Sabha constituency: Sambalpur
- Vidhan Sabha constituency: 4: 015-Kuchinda(ST) 016-Rengali(SC) 017-Sambalpur 018-Rairakhol
- Website: www.sambalpur.nic.in

Sambalpur district (Odia: [sɔmbɔlɔpuɾɔ]) is a district in the western part of state of Odisha, India. The historic city of Sambalpur is the district headquarters.

The district is located in the Mahanadi River basin. It has a total area of 6,702 km^{2} (2,588 sq mi), of which almost 60% is covered in dense forest. The district is bounded by Deogarh District to the east, Bargarh and Jharsuguda districts to the west, Sundergarh District to the north, and Subarnapur and Angul districts in the south.

Sambalpur City is the connecting city between Chhattisgarh and Odisha. Whereas it used to be known for its importance as a diamond trading centre, nowadays it is mainly known for its textiles, especially the Sambalpuri Saree.

== History ==
In Lasa near Kuchinda, a stone celt was found dating back to the Paleolithic period. Proto-historic writing was found in a cave in nearby Jharsuguda district.

The region was most likely in the pre-Maghadan empire of Mahapadmananda. However there is no mention of the territory in Mauryan inscriptions, so it is unknown whether the Mauryans controlled this region or not. After the collapse of the Mauryan empire, This region was ruled by the Chedis. It was most likely part of Kharavela's empire. Sambalpur is mentioned in the book of Ptolemy (2nd century) as Sambalaka on the river Manada (the Mahanadi River), and by the Romans for their export of numerous diamonds, which were mined in the Mahanadi until the early 17th century. After Kharevala, the Megha dynasty ruled the region. Then became part of Dakhina Koshala In the 4th century CE, the Allahabad inscription records Samudra Gupta defeated Mahendra of Kosala, corresponding roughly to present-day Chhattisgarh plains and western Odisha. Although not annexed to the Gupta empire, Kosala remained within Gupta spheres of influence evidenced by presence of Gupta coins in the region.

Padmasambhava, one of the main early scholars of Tibetan Buddhism, was said to be the son of the king of Sambhal of Oddiyana. Almost all historians see this area as the Swat Valley; some cite literary and archaeological evidence to associate Oddiyana with modern-day Odisha. There is evidence to suggest Sambalpur was a centre of Tantric philosophy.

In the 6th century, the Sarabhpuriyas from Sarabha (now identified as Sirpur in Chhattisgarh) came to prominence. Their territory included present-day Sambalpur district, as well as parts of Kalahandi. They were succeeded by the Panduvamshis, whose king, Tivaradeva, tried to expand east of Kosala into Utkala, now coastal Odisha. Although he failed, he kept control of Kosala. In the last decades of the 9th century, the Somavamshis ruled over present-day Kosala. Janamejaya I expanded his domain south and east, and defeated the Kalachuris. His son Yayati was blocked by the Kalachuris when attempting to expand into the north and west of Kosala. The Somavamshis were defeated during Rajendra Chola's northern expedition. In the chaos that followed, Yayati II stabilized the kingdom, which corresponded to modern Odisha. His son beat off Kalachuri invasions during his reign, but the kingdom soon collapsed. Kosala fell into Telugu Choda hands, who had aided a rival king who defeated the Somvamshis. The Telugu Chodas were soon driven out by the Kalachuris. The Kalachuris soon began a long struggle with the Eastern Ganga dynasty, which ended 100 years after when the Gangas drove the Kalachuris out around 1211. After Eastern Ganga dynasty, this area ruled by mighty Gajapati Empire. Under Kapilendra Deva, Gajapatis became an empire stretching from the lower Ganga in the north to the Kaveri in the south. However, the continued aggression of the Bengal sultanate from the north and the Vijayanagara and Bahmani empires from the south weakened the Gajapati empire. Ultimately Balarama Deva, a Chauhan Rajput from North India founded Chauhan rule in western Orissa. The Chauhans continued ruling independently until the mid-18th century. The rulers then were weak, and real power rested in the diwans. Akbar Ray was the most powerful of these diwans. Ray soon took Sambalpur by force, and antagonised the Marathas of Nagpur. However, he was soon overthrown by Jayant Singh in 1781. However, the state faced constant attacks by the Marathas of Nagpur, who attempted to subdue the kingdom by force. Eventually, in 1800, they conquered the kingdom and placed a governor there and imprisoned the Chauhans in Chandrapur. During the Second Anglo-Maratha War in 1804, Sambalpur fell into British hands. However, these territories were returned to the Marathas in 1806. After the Third Anglo-Maratha war in 1817, Sambalpur became officially British territory and the Chauhans were restored to the throne. However they lacked the former authority over their feudal lords which they had before.

In 1827, the king Maharaja Sai died and his widow was placed on the throne. Incensed by the breach of custom of letting a woman rule, many of the Gond and Binjhal landlords, threatened by caste Hindu favourites of the rani, supported a rival claimant Surendra Sai. The insurgency lasted for a long time until British troops defeated the insurgents. The British then deposed the rani and placed a distant descendant on the throne.

When Sambalpur's ruler died without a direct male heir in 1849, the British seized the state under the doctrine of lapse. During the 1857 rebellion, mutineers stationed in Sambalpur broke Surendra Sai and his companions out of jail, and they soon raised an army against the British. While initially he simply wanted his and his brother's sentences commuted, when the British proposed harsher punishments and began closely guarding him, he escaped to where his brother had gathered 2000 men. Many of the principal zamindars were mustering their paiks against the British. However, the British came down with troops from Nagpur, the Madras Presidency and Chota Nagpur. They defeated the insurgents in open country and by February 1858 had taken back most of the district, but the insurgents were able to use the dense jungles and difficult terrain to their advantage. By 1861, the British adopted a more conciliatory approach to surrendering rebels, and finally in 1862 Surendra Sai surrendered. However the insurgency continued and in 1864, Surendra Sai was arrested and his brothers too. They were all put in prison, where they died. Today Surendra Sai and his rebels are honoured as freedom fighters.

It was attached to the British Bengal Presidency, but was transferred to the Central Provinces in 1862. The district was transferred back to Bengal in 1905, but the subdivisions of Phuljhar and Chandarpur-Padampur remained with the Central Provinces. Bengal's Odisha division became part of the new province of Bihar and Orissa in 1912, and in 1936 became the separate province of Odisha. In 1890, the British replaced Odia with Hindi as the language of administration. Beginning in Sambalpur and spreading throughout the state, the Odia language agitation forced the British to back down.

Sambalpur had its own contributions to the freedom struggle such as Chandra Shankar Behera, Nilakantha Das, Kastaram Tanti, who propagated ideals of freedom struggle among the people.

After Indian Independence in 1947, Odisha became an Indian state. Earlier, Sambalpur District also included the districts of Bargarh, Jharsuguda and Debagarh. which was subsequently divided into four separate districts. Bargarh was separated in 1993, and Jharsuguda and Debagarh districts were separated in 1994.

It is currently a part of the Red Corridor.

=== Asta Sambhus ===
In the district of Sambalpur, a large number of Shiva temples were built during the Chauhan period.

== Economy ==
The economy of Sambalpur District is basically dependent on agriculture and secondly on forests. Forests play an important role in the economy in terms of contribution to revenue, Domestic Product as well as dependence of people for livelihood. The people living adjacent to the reserved forests of Sambalpur Forest Division are heavily dependent on these forests. In the past Sambalpur has been a great centre of diamond trade. Kendu leaf (Diospyros Melanoxylon) is also produced in Sambalpur. Kendu leaf is one of the most important non-wood forest products of Sambalpur and is also called as green gold of Odisha. Lately industrialisation has started in the district and the prime industries of power, alumina and steel have been established. The place is famous for its globally renowned textile bounded patterns and fabrics locally known as Baandha. Sambalpur is famous for its Hand loom textile works. Popularly known as Sambalpuri Textile. It has earned international fame for its unique pattern, design and texture. Apart from textiles, Samabalpur has a rich tribal heritage and fabulous forestlands.

In 2006 the Ministry of Panchayati Raj named Sambalpur one of the country's 250 most backward districts (out of a total of 640). It is one of the 19 districts in Odisha currently receiving funds from the Backward Regions Grant Fund Programme (BRGF).

== Demographics ==
Historical population
Year	Pop.	±%
1901	215,645	—
1911	249,710	+15.8%
1921	261,043	+4.5%
1931	291,723	+11.8%
1941	328,576	+12.6%
1951	355,685	+8.3%
1961	445,745	+25.3%
1971	549,157	+23.2%
1981	682,700	+24.3%
1991	809,017	+18.5%
2001	930,476	+15.0%
2011	1,041,099	+11.9%
Source: Census of India

Religions in Sambalpur district (2011)
Religion	Percent
Hinduism	92.61%
Christianity	4.86%
Islam	1.93%
Other or not stated	0.60%

According to the 2011 census Sambalpur district has a population of 1,041,099, roughly equal to the nation of Cyprus or the US state of Rhode Island. This gives it a ranking of 433rd in India (out of a total of 640). The district has a population density of 158 inhabitants per square kilometre (410/sq mi). Its population growth rate over the decade 2001–2011 was 11.63%. Sambalpur has a sex ratio of 973 females for every 1000 males, and a literacy rate of 76.91%. 29.59% of the population lives in urban areas. Scheduled Castes and Scheduled Tribes make up 18.43% and 34.12% of the population respectively.

=== Languages ===
Languages of Sambalpur district (2011)
1. Odia (52.4%)
2. Sambalpuri (26.4%)
3. Kisan (4.98%)
4. Hindi (3.98%)
5. Mundari (3.88%)
6. Sadri (1.85%)
7. Kharia (1.49%)
8. Others (5.03%)

At the 2011 Census of India, 52.41% mentioned Odia as their native language, while it was Sambalpuri for 26.38%, Kisan for 4.98%, Hindi for 3.98%, Mundari for 3.88%, Sadri for 1.85% and Kharia for 1.49%.

== Culture ==
=== Tourism ===
Samaleswari, the presiding deity in Hinduism in this region is enshrined at Samlei Gudi on the bank of Mahanadi River. The other temple of importance is the Budharaja Temple, dedicated to Shiva and is perched atop the Budharaja hill. These temples are located at a few kilometres' distance from Sambalpur. The Hirakud Dam, the longest earthen dam of the world, is some 15 kilometres from Sambalpur.

== Notable people ==
- Veer Surendra Sai: First Freedom fighter of Odisha, Sambalpur royal family member
- Gangadhar Meher: Famous poet of Odisha
- Shradhakar Supakar: Social Activist, Politician and Writer, MLA of Sambalpur, Member Of Rajya sabha
- Bhima Bhoi: Famous blind Poet, Santha Kabi and Reformer
- Pramod Kumar Mishra: Principal Secretary to P.M, one of the Strongest IAS Officers in India
- Krupasindhu Bhoi: Member Of Parliament, Sambalpur Constituency
- Sarat Pujari: Veteran Actor in Odia Film Industry
- Suresh Pujari: Member Of Parliament, Bargarh Constituency
- Shriyanka Sadangi: Indian sports shooter
- Lochana Munda: India international footballer

== Politics ==
=== Vidhan sabha constituencies ===
The following is the 4 Vidhan sabha constituencies of Sambalpur district and the elected members of that area

No.	Constituency	Reservation	Extent of the Assembly Constituency (Blocks)	Member	Party
15	Kuchinda	ST	Kuchinda (NAC), Kuchinda, Bamra, Jamankira	Rabi narayan Naik	BJP
16	Rengali	SC	Rengali, Dhankauda, Maneswar (part)	Sudarshan Haripal	BJD
17	Sambalpur	None	Sambalpur (M), Burla (NAC), Hirakud (NAC)	Jaynarayan Mishra	BJP
18	Rairakhol	None	Rairakhol (NAC), Rairakhol, Jujomura, Naktideul, Maneswar (part)	Prasanna Acharya	BJD
