= Nuagan =

Nuagaon
- Town
- Location in Odisha, India Nuagaon (India)
- Coordinates: 20°16′0″N 84°58′0″E
- Country: India
- State: Odisha
- District: Nayagarh
- Elevation: 0.875 m (2.87 ft)

Languages
  - Official: Oriya [English]
- Time zone: UTC+5:30 (IST)
- PIN: 770050
- Vehicle registration: OD
- Coastline: 0 kilometres (0 mi)
- Nearest city: Nayagarh
- Website: odisha.gov.in

Nuagan is a town in Nayagarh district of Odisha state of India.

== Geography ==
It is located at 20°16′0″N 84°58′0″E at an elevation of 3 ft above MSL.

== Location ==
National Highway 227 Khurda-Balangir passes through Nuagan is around 16 km west of Balugaon, on the Dashapalla- Nayagarh - Chandapur road, in Nayagarh district. It is about 14 km from Dashapalla, 10 km south of Madhyakandha and 25 km north of Odagan.

The nearest picnic spots are Kuanria Deer Park, Baisipali Wildlife Sanctuary and Kuanria Dam.

Khurda Road Junction Railway Station, on the Visakhapatnam-Cuttack rail route, serves the place. Biju Patnaik Airport in Bhubaneswar is the nearest airport.
