= Siko =

Village in Odisha, India

Siko ସିକୋ
- Village
- Location in Odisha, India Siko (India)
- Country: India
- State: Odisha
- District: Khordha
- Block: Begunia

Government
  - Type: Gram Panchayat
- Elevation: 65 m (213 ft)

Population (2011)
  - Total: 2,465
- Time zone: UTC+5:30 (IST)
- PIN: 752048
- Vehicle registration: OD-02

Siko is the second largest populated village and a Gram Panchayat in the Begunia block of the Khordha district in the Indian state of Odisha. It is located approximately 45 kilometres (28 mi) west of the state capital, Bhubaneswar. It has a mixed, rich culture mainly consisting of Hindus and Muslims, with Hindus making up a majority. Ardent nationalists from Siko participated in the Paika rebellion of 1817. Today, some "Paika akhada" are found in Siko. They display their warrior acts in various festivals.

== Geography ==
Siko is situated in the coastal plains of Odisha at an elevation of 65 metres (213 ft) above mean sea level. The village is located near the boundary of the Khordha and Nayagarh districts. It sits along the State Highway which connects Begunia to Bolagarh. The climate is tropical, characterized by hot summers, high humidity, and a monsoon season from June to September.

== Demographics ==
According to the 2011 Census of India, Siko had a total population of 2,465, split between 1,285 males and 1,180 females. The literacy rate of the village was recorded at 78.45%, which is higher than the Odisha state average of 72.87%. Male literacy stands at approximately 86%, while female literacy is around 70%.

The primary language spoken in the area is Odia.

== Administration ==
As per the Constitution of India and the Panchayati Raj Act, Siko is administered by a Sarpanch (Head of Village), who is an elected representative of the village. It falls under the Begunia Vidhan Sabha constituency and the Bhubaneswar Lok Sabha constituency.

== Economy ==
The economy of Siko is primarily agrarian. A significant portion of the population is engaged in agriculture and allied activities. Rice is the staple crop cultivated during the Kharif season. In recent years, small-scale retail and service businesses have developed around the village market area.

== Education ==
The village has educational facilities ranging from primary to secondary levels. Notable institutions in and around the immediate vicinity include:

- Siko High School: A government-aided secondary school established to serve the local student population.
- Several primary schools and Anganwadi centres providing early childhood education.

== Transport ==
Siko is connected by road to major nearby towns.

- Road: It is accessible via the road network connecting Begunia and Khordha. Local buses and auto-rickshaws are the primary modes of public transport.
- Rail: The nearest major railway station is Khordha Road Junction, located approximately 40 km away.
- Air: The nearest airport is Biju Patnaik International Airport in Bhubaneswar.

== Culture ==
The village observes traditional Odia festivals, including Raja, Ratha Yatra, and Durga Puja. The local community organizes annual fairs and cultural programs associated with local temples.
