= Fategarh, Odisha =

Fategarh ଫତେଗଡ
- Village
- Location in Odisha, India
- Coordinates: 20°18′N 85°20′E
- Country: India
- State: Odisha
- District: Nayagarh
- Tehsil: Bhapur

Government
  - Type: Gram panchayat

Area
  - Total: 6.50 km^{2} (2.51 sq mi)

Population (2011)
  - Total: 4,611
  - Density: 709/km^{2} (1,840/sq mi)
- Time zone: UTC+5:30 (IST)
- PIN code: 752063
- Vehicle registration: OD
- Census 2011 village code: 406124.

Fategarh (ଫତେଗଡ) is a village and gram panchayat in Bhapur tehsil, Nayagarh district, Odisha, India.

As of 2011 Census of India, Fategarh had a population of 4,611.

== Geography ==
Fategarh is located in Bhapur tehsil and community development block of Nayagarh district, Odisha, India. The village covers a total geographical area of 650 ha (6.5 km^{2}). It is situated approximately 40 km from the district headquarters at Nayagarh. The nearest town is Khandapada, approximately 20 km to the west.

== Demographics ==
According to the 2011 Census of India, Fategarh had a population of 4,611, comprising 2,387 males and 2,224 females. The village had 1,098 households. The sex ratio was 931 females per 1,000 males. Children aged six and under numbered 483, comprising approximately 10.5% of the total population.

The overall literacy rate was 71.09%, with male literacy at 78.47% and female literacy at 63.17%. Of the population, 334 individuals belonged to Scheduled Castes and 6 to Scheduled Tribes.

== Transport ==
Fategarh is served by public and private bus services, as well as auto-rickshaw and taxi services. The village is connected by a black-topped, all-weather major district road. The nearest railway station is Begunia, approximately 25 km away, on the Khurda Road–Bolangir railway line. Nayagarh district first gained rail connectivity in November 2015 with the commissioning of this line up to Rajsunakhala.

== Nearby places of interest ==
The Tarabalo hot springs are located in Bhapur block, spread over an area of 8 acres (3.2 ha). The springs are considered the largest thermal field in Odisha, and their sulphur-rich water is traditionally associated with medicinal properties, particularly for skin diseases.

The town of Khandapada, approximately 20 km to the west, was the former capital of Khandpara State during the British Raj. The town is home to the Khandapada Palace (Rajbati), a 19th-century royal residence reflecting Odia architectural traditions, and is the birthplace of Pathani Samanta (1835–1904), the Indian astronomer and mathematician known for calculating astronomical distances using traditional instruments.
