= Khurda Road–Nayagarh Town Passenger =

Train in India

Khurda Road – Nayagarh Town Passenger
Overview
- Service type: Passenger
- Locale: Odisha
- First service: July 15, 2015; 11 years ago (Inaugural service); June 20, 2017; 9 years ago (Extension service)
- Current operator: East Coast Railway

Route
- Termini: Khurda Road Junction (KUR); Nayagarh Town (NYGT)
- Stops: 4
- Distance travelled: 67 km (42 mi)
- Average journey time: 1h 55m
- Service frequency: Daily (Note: Runs seven days in a week for every direction.)
- Train number: 58429DN / 58430UP / 58431DN / 58432UP

On-board services
- Class: Unreserved
- Seating arrangements: Yes
- Sleeping arrangements: No
- Catering facilities: No
- Observation facilities: ICF coach
- Entertainment facilities: No
- Baggage facilities: No
- Other facilities: Below the seats

Technical
- Rolling stock: 2
- Track gauge: 1,676 mm (5 ft 6 in)
- Electrification: Yes
- Operating speed: 35 km/h (22 mph) average with halts

The Khurda Road–Nayagarh Town Passenger is a Passenger train belonging to East Coast Railway zone that runs between Khurda Road Junction railway station and Nayagarh Town, in the Eastern Indian state Odisha.

== Arrival and departure ==
- Train no. 58429DN departs from Khurda Road at 19:35 and reaches Nayagarh Town at 21:30
- Train no. 58430UP departs from Nayagarh Town at 05:00 and reaches Khurda Road at 07:00
- Train no. 58431DN departs from Khurda Road at 07:45 and reaches Nayagarh Town at 09:30
- Train no. 58432UP departs from Nayagarh Town at 10:00 and reaches Khurda Road at 11:30

== Route and halts ==
The important halts of the train are :

- Khurda Road Junction
- Khurda Town, Totapada
- Begunia
- Rajsunakhala
- Bolagarh Road
- Nayagarh Town

== Loco link ==
This train was hauled by a Visakhapatnam-based WDM-3A from Khurda Road to Nayagarh.

== See also ==
- Khurda Road–Bolangir line
- Khurda Road Junction railway station
- Nayagarh Town railway station
