= Baunsagadia =

- Village
- Location in Orissa
- Coordinates: 20°40′6″N 86°4′29″E
- Country: India
- State: Odisha
- District: Nayagarh
- Time zone: UTC5:30 (IST)

Baunshagadia is a village in Nayagarh district, Odisha, India. It is 16 km from the district headquarters, Nayagarh.
