= Kantilo =

- Village
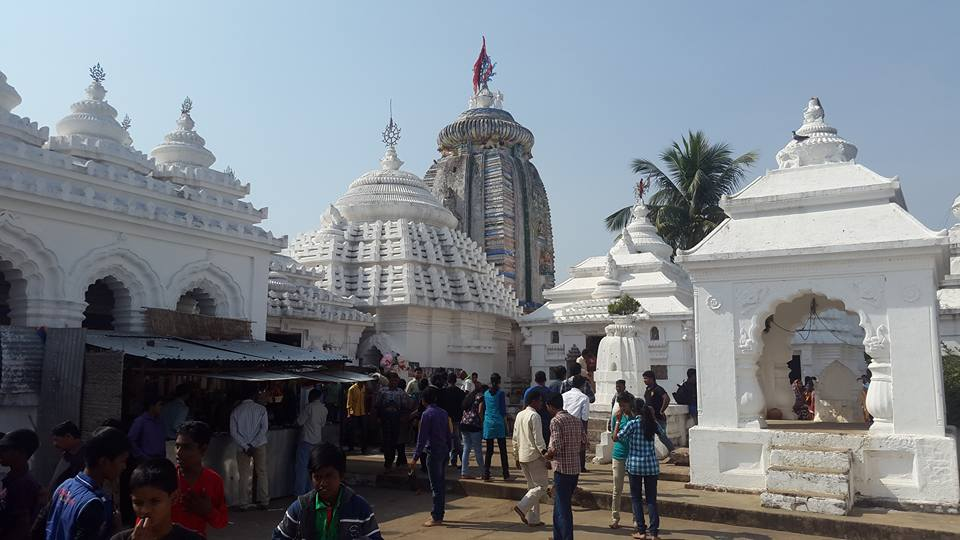
- Nilamadhav Temple at Kantilo

- Location in Odisha, India Kantilo (India)
- Coordinates: 20.35°N 85.18°E
- Country: India
- State: Odisha
- District: Nayagarh

Government
  - Type: kantilo G.P
  - Body: Panchayat

Area
  - Total: 30 km^{2} (12 sq mi)
- Elevation: 65 m (213 ft)

Population (2011)
  - Total: 6,000
  - Density: 200/km^{2} (520/sq mi)

Odia, English, Hindi
  - Official: Odia
- Time zone: UTC+5:30 (IST)
- Vehicle registration: OD
- Website: odisha.gov.in

Kantilo is a Village and Grama panchayat in Nayagarh district in the Indian state of Odisha. It is a holy place famous for "Lord Nilamadhab". It is an important commercial place in district of Nayagarh. It is also famous for its hand crafted utensils and other materials.

== Geography ==
Kantilo is located at 20.35°N 85.18°E. It has an average elevation of 65 metres (213 feet). The temperature varies from 15 °C (59 °F) to 40 °C (104 °F).

== Demographics ==
As of 2001 India census, Kantilo had a population of 8728. Males constitute 51% of the population and females 49%. Kantilo has an average literacy rate of 72%, higher than the national average of 59.5%: male literacy is 80%, and female literacy is 64%. In Kantilo, 11% of the population is under 6 years of age.

== Places of interest ==
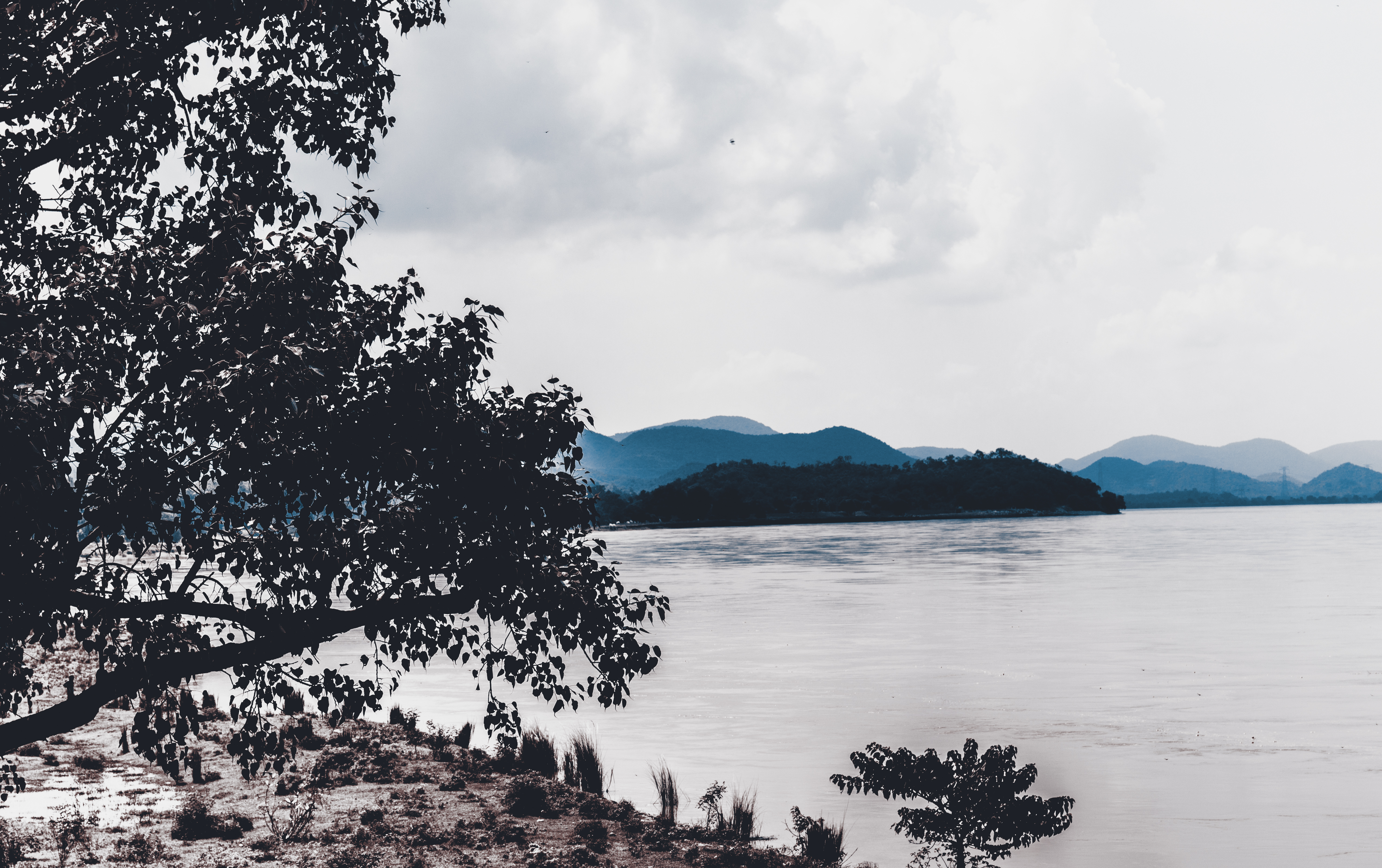
Mahanadi near Kantilo

Name	Famous For
Kantilo	Nilamadhav Temple
Kantilo	Narayani Temple
Sidhamula	Gokulananda Tourism Center
Sarankul	Ladukeswar Temple
Odagaon	Raghunath Temple
Dutikeswar	Shiv Temple
Dashapalla	Kuanria Dam
Ranapur	Maninageswari Temple
Satokasia	Sanctuary
Baisipalli	Sanctuary

== Educational Institutions ==
- Nilamadhab (Degree) Mahavidyalaya
- Nilamadhab Higher Secondary School
- Nilamadhab Nodal High School
- Kunjabihari Nodal High School
- Panusahupatana Upper Primary School
- Kantilo Girl's Primary School
- SSVM kantilo
- St Xavier's school kantilo
- Radhanath Girl's Primary School

== Connectivity ==
Kantilo is 100 km from its state capital Bhubaneswar and 33 km from district headquarters Nayagarh. Kantilo is famous for bell metal utensil, but nowadays it is losing its sheen.

== Geographical indication ==
Nayagarh Kanteimundi brinjal was awarded the Geographical Indication (GI) status tag from the Geographical Indications Registry, under the Union Government of India, on 2 January 2024 and is valid until 7 February 2031.

Neelamadhav Krushi Sanghathan from Banapur, proposed the GI registration of Nayagarh Kanteimundi brinjal. After filing the application in February 2021, the Brinjal was granted the GI tag in 2024 by the Geographical Indication Registry in Chennai, making the name "Nayagarh Kanteimundi brinjal" exclusive to the Brinjal grown in the region. It thus became the first brinjal variety from Odisha and the 23rd type of goods from Odisha to earn the GI tag.

=== Name ===
Nayagarh Kanteimundi brinjal is a prized vegetable crop in Nayagarh and so named after it. "Kante" means "Thorn" in the local state language of "Odia" while "mundi" means head. As per a survey, The word "Kanteimundi", is a name given by farmers in this locality called "Kantilo", and based on the small, prickly thorns found on the stem, calyx, and the actual body of brinjal.

The GI tag protects the brinjal from illegal selling and marketing, and gives it legal protection and a unique identity.
