= Nayagarh Town railway station =

Railway station in Odisha, India

Nayagarh Town (NYGT)

General information
- Location: Nayagarh–Khandpada Road, Nayagarh, Odisha; India
- Coordinates: 20.1439°N 85.1151°E
- Elevation: 84 metres (276 ft)
- System: Passenger train station
- Owner: Indian Railways
- Operator: East Coast Railway Zone
- Line: Khurda Road–Bolangir line
- Platforms: 4
- Tracks: 6
- Connections: Auto stand

Construction
- Structure type: Standard (on-ground station)
- Parking: Yes
- Cycle facilities: Yes

Other information
- Status: Functioning
- Station code: NYGT
- Zone(s): East Coast Railway Zone
- Division(s): Khurda Road

History
- Opened: 20 June 2017; 9 years ago
- Electrified: 2021; 5 years ago

Services
Preceding station	Indian Railways	Following station
Bolagarh Road towards ?	East Coast Railway zone Khurda Road–Bolangir line	Mahipur towards ?
Location
- Location within Odisha Location within India

Nayagarh Town (NYGT) Railway Station is the main railway station in Nayagarh District, Odisha. It serves Nayagarh City. The station consists of four platforms.

== Trains ==
- Khurda Road–Nayagarh Town Passenger
- Bhubaneswar–Nayagarh Town Seva MEMU Express
- Bhubaneswar-Nuagaon Road MEMU special
- Puri-Nuagaon Road Passenger Special
- Bhadrak-Nayagarh Town MEMU special
