= Gokulananda Tourism Center =

Gokulananda Picnic Spot
- Village
- Location in Orissa, India
- Coordinates: 20.401°N 85.108°E
- Country: India
- District: Nayagarh
- Elevation: 67 m (220 ft)

Languages
  - Official: Oriya
- Time zone: UTC+5:30 (IST)
- Postal code: 752078

Gokulananda Tourism Center, also known as (Gokulananda picnic spot), is a tourism center situated in Sidhamula village, in Nayagarh, Odisha. People come here, to see the scenery of this spot and for picnic purposes, mainly between the months of October to March.

This center is situated on the bank of river Mahanadi. The tourism center consists of Gokulananda temple, an attached picnic area. The temple is on the top of the hill. It is founded by late Sri Baba Swami Ram Laxman Dash Maharaja. It is nice to watch the panoramic view of the hill and flowing water of Mahanadi from the hill as well as from Sidhamula bridge. The hill is full of tall trees and medicinal plants. There is nearly 1 km of plane surface full of greenery on bottom of the hill on the bank of river Mahanadi suitable for cooking as well as playing games which attracts most of the local and nearby district tourists to this place.

Nearest Tourist Place
Name	Famous For
Kantilo	Nilamadhab Temple
Sarankul	Ladukeswar Temple
Odagaon	Raghunath Temple
Dutikeswar	Shiv Temple
Daspalla	Kuanria Dam
Ranapur	Maninageswari Temple
Satokasia	Sanctuary
Baisipalli	Sanctuary
