= State Highway 1 (Odisha) =

State highway in Odisha, India

State Highway 1

Location
- Country: India
- State: Odisha

Highway system
- Roads in India; Expressways; National; State; Asian; State Highways in Odisha

Odisha's State Highway 1 is a state highway in the Indian state of Odisha.

It connects Dindigul to Damerikia via Begunia, Pichukuli, Bolagarh, Nayagarh, Sampada, Korada, Patapurpatana, Niliguda, Banigocha, Titirikada, Khajuripada, Phulbani, Teraguda and Sarangapada. It forms a part of National Highway 224, stretching to the village of Banigocha.
