= Barapalli =

- Village
- Location in Orissa, India
- Coordinates: 20.1496°N 85.1156°E
- Country: India
- State: Odisha
- District: Nayagarh

Languages
  - Official: Oriya
- Time zone: UTC+5:30 (IST)

Barapalli is a village situated 3 km from district Nayagarh in Odisha, India. The village has around 150 houses.

== Religion ==
Most of the villagers are Brahmins. Thirty per cent of the population are from other castes, including those who depend on agriculture; a few people belong to scheduled caste.

== Education ==
There is one government M.E. school, Barapalli UGME school, from Standard 1 to Standard 7. The roll of the school is around 100. There is a government-aided high School named Barapalli High School, from Eighth Standard to Tenth Standard. After finishing the school, students opt for different colleges. The nearby college is Nayagarh College, which is about five kilometres away.

== Employment ==
Some of the villagers are employed in government jobs. Most of them are teachers and clerks. A few of them are in the Indian Air Force and in the police. Few people are working overseas and MNC in India. Most of the educated young men are still unemployed.

== Culture ==
There is a temple named Mahadev Temple. People worship Lord Shiva and Goddess Parvati. The pond in front of the temple is the property of Lord Mahadev. Most of the villagers used to do bathing and washing their clothes in the pond. There is no drinking water supply available to the village. People take water from the well and manage their cooking and drinking.
