= Satkosia Tiger Reserve =

Indian tiger reserve

- IUCN category IV (habitat/species management area)
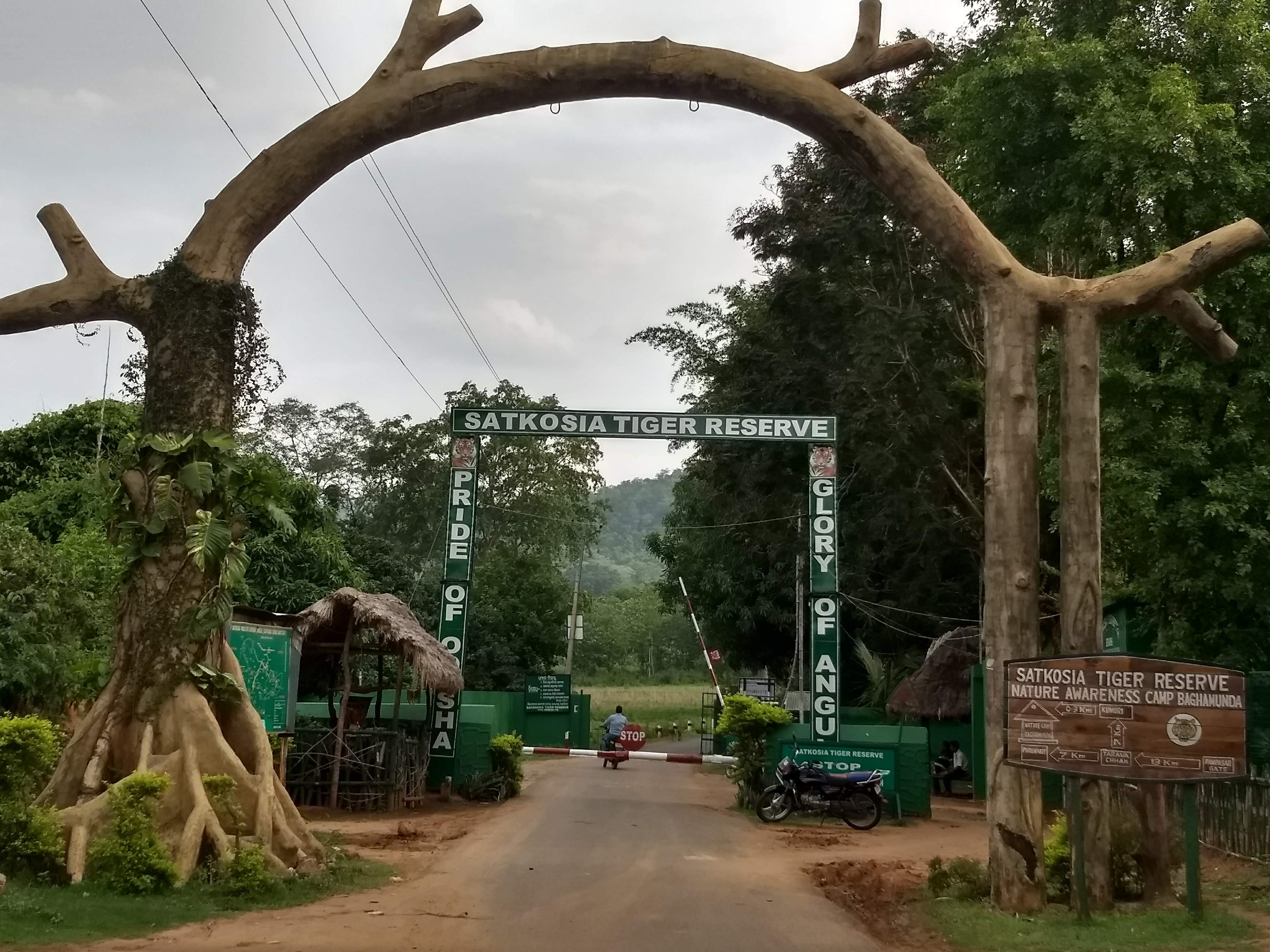
- Satkosia Tiger Reserve Entrance

- Location within Odisha Location within India
- Interactive map of Satkosia Tiger Reserve
- Location: Angul district and Nayagarh district, Odisha, India
- Coordinates: 20.540137°N 84.831564°E
- Area: 963.87 km^{2} (372.15 sq mi)
- Established: 1976 (Wildlife Sanctuary); 2007 (Tiger Reserve)

Satkosia Tiger Reserve is a tiger reserve located in the Angul and Nayagarh district of Odisha, India covering an area of 963.87 km^{2}. It was declared a wildlife sanctuary in 1976 and a tiger reserve in 2007.

== History ==
Satkosia Gorge Wildlife Sanctuary was created in 1976, with an area of 796 km^{2}. Satkosia Tiger Reserve was designated in 2007, and comprises the Satkosia Gorge Wildlife Sanctuary and the adjacent Baisipalli Wildlife Sanctuary.

== Geography ==
Satkosia Tiger Reserve is located in the Anugul and Nayagarh district. It is located where the Mahanadi River passes through a 22 km long gorge in the Eastern Ghats mountains.

== Wildlife ==
The tiger reserve is located in the Eastern Highlands moist deciduous forests ecoregion.

=== Flora ===
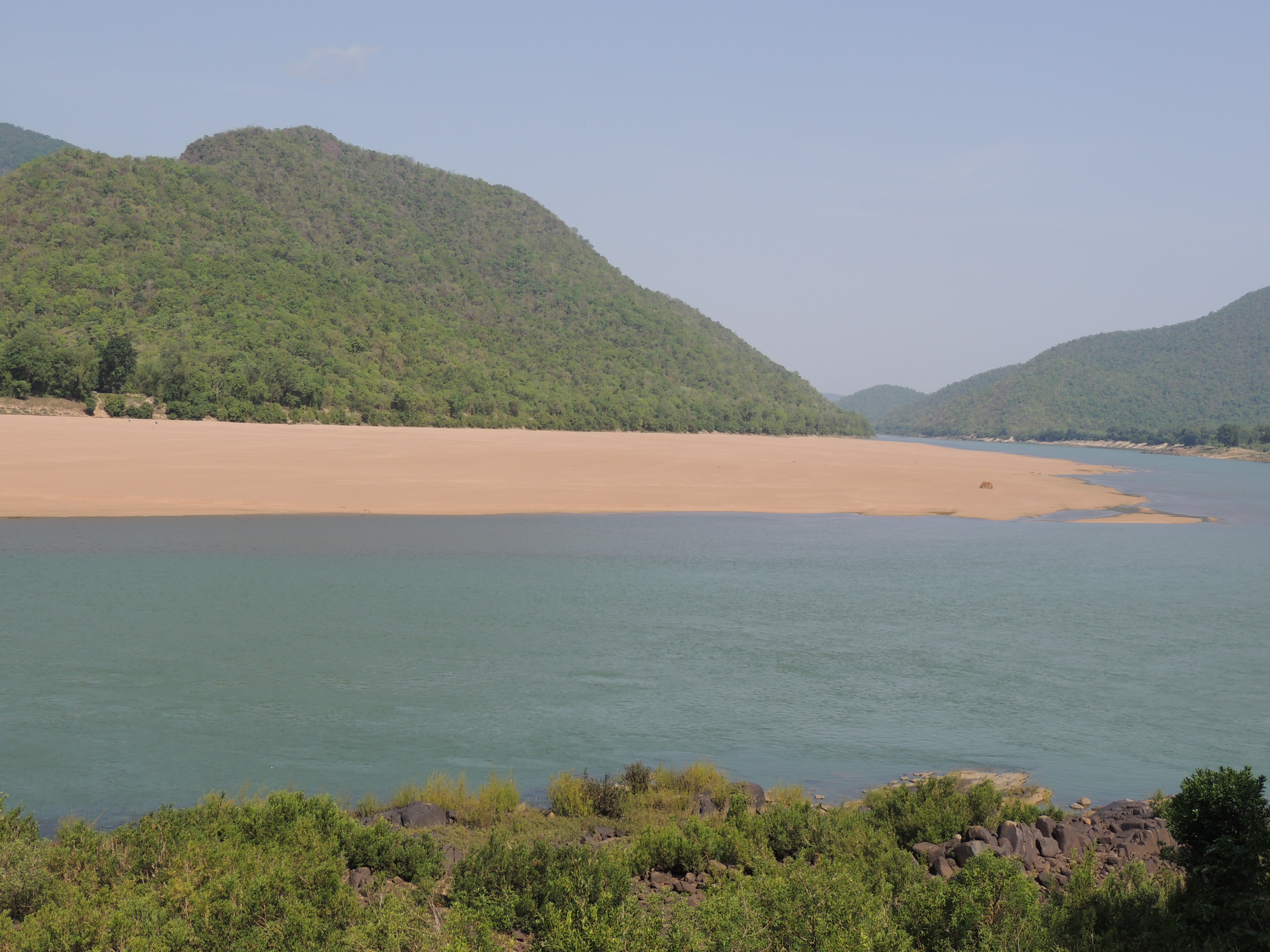
Mahanadi river in Satkosia Tiger Reserve

The major plant communities are mixed deciduous forests including Sal (Shorea robusta), and riverine forest.

=== Fauna ===
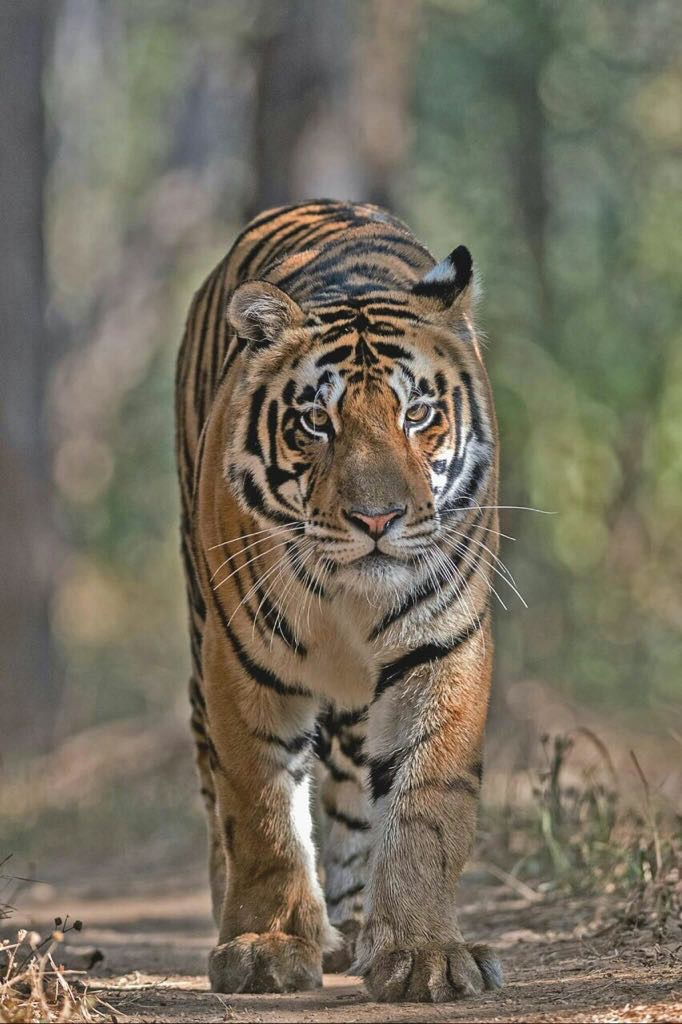
Tiger translocated from Kanha Tiger reserve to Satakosia Tiger Reserve

Mammals found include the leopard, Indian wild dog or the (dhole), wild boars, striped hyena, sloth bear, leopard cat and the jungle cat. The major herbivores include the Asian elephant which is found in large numbers and can often be seen crossing rivers. Spotted deer, sambar deer, barking deer, langurs, porcupines and pangolins are the other herbivores found here. The reptiles here include the Mugger Crocodile and gharials. Other reptiles include the Indian python which can feed on large mammals like the spotted deer. The Indian giant squirrel is also found here.

This place also has many fishes like the cat fish which can have a weight of about 30 kilograms.

Tigers are currently not present here. The National Tiger Conservation Authority, which had approved the transfer of six tigers from the wild of Madhya Pradesh's Kanha National Park to Satkosia Tiger Reserve in Odisha, has suspended the tiger translocation project pending a detailed review. The decision was taken after the first big cat, a male Royal Bengal tiger that had been translocated from Kanha tiger reserve in MP to Satkosia in Nayagarh in June this year, was found dead in core area of the forest. The translocation program was suspended in 2019.
