= Jadumani Mahapatra =

Indian poet (1781–1866)

Utkala Ghanta Jadumani Mahapatra
- Born: 8 January 1781; Athagada Patna, Ganjam
- Died: 2 July 1866 (aged 85); Itamati, Nayagarh
- Occupations: Odissi music poet-composer, humorist
- Known for: Raghaba Bilasa, Prabandha Purnnachandra
- Style: Odissi music

Jadumani Mahapatra (alternatively spelled Mohapatra; Jadumaṇi Mahāpātra, Odia: [ଯଦୁମଣି ମହାପାତ୍ର]; 1781–1866) also known as Utkala Ghanta was an Odia language poet, humorist and satirist, who was principal poet during the rule of King Vinayak Singh Mandhata of Nayagarh princely state in present day Odisha. He was known for his devotional songs and poems, and also his wit and satire.

== Biography ==
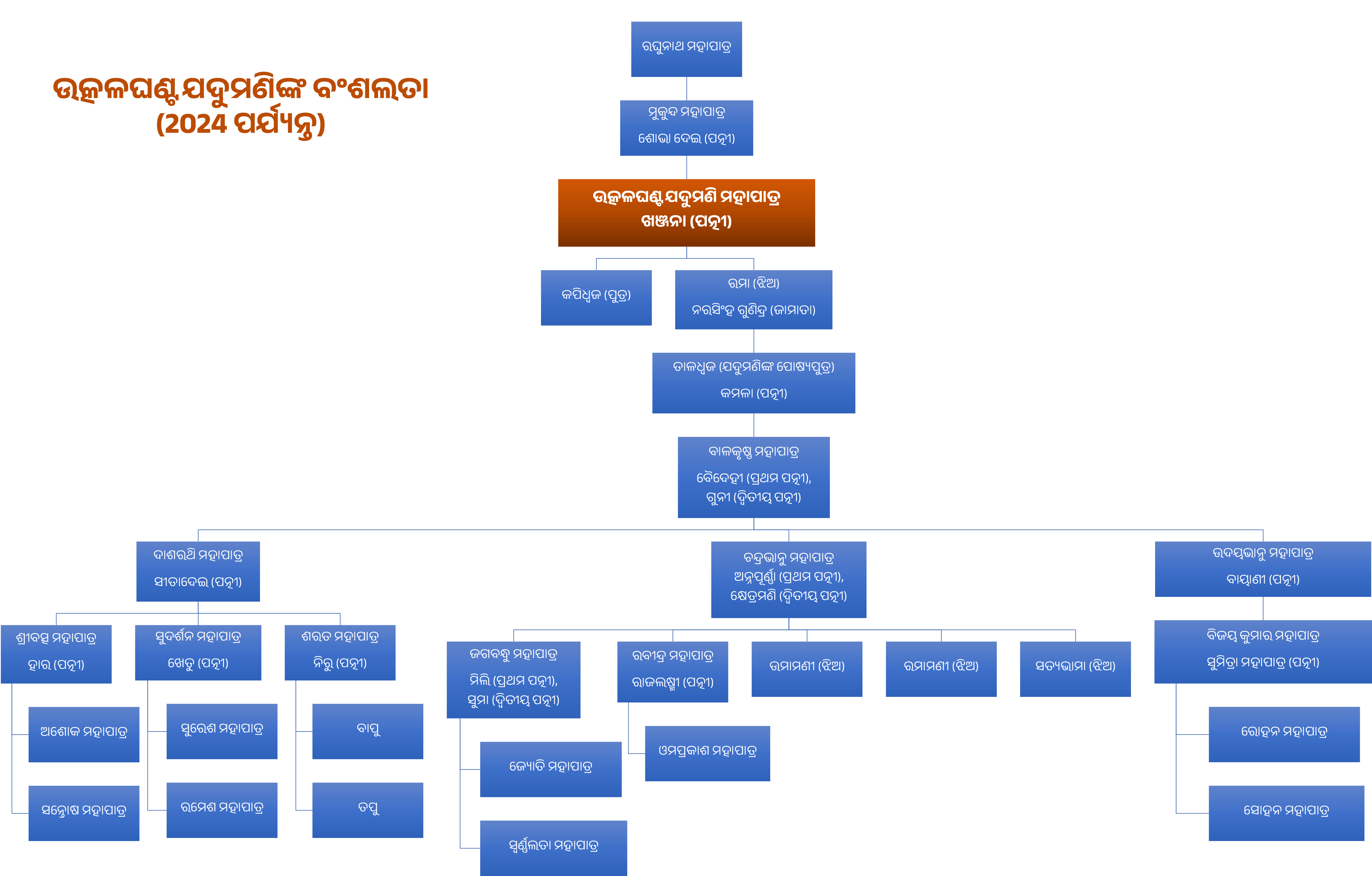
Jaduani Mohapatra Family Tree

Born at Athagada Patana of Ganjam, his family shifted to Itamati in present Nayagarh district of Odisha when Jadumani was just a child. He studied Sanskrit grammar from Vidyadhar Mohapatra of Mandhatapur. There is a story about his being the humorist poet in Odiya language. It is said that once given a mantra by a yogi (saint) he meditated upon Lord Hayagriba (one of the incarnations of lord Vishnu according to Hindu mythology) for His blessing. When the Lord appeared before him and asked him to express his wish, he to the God's utmost pleasure told how He cleans His nose as He is occupied with different aayudhas (weapons and other armaments) in all his hands, to which the God could not prevent Himself laughing, and blessed him to be a humorist poet from that day and he can write poems instantly without any imagination and thinking at any place, not only restricted to study rooms as poets usually do to write poems. It is also said that as he used the bamboo mat usually left by a dead person's family members at samshan (cremation ground) while chanting the Hayagriba mantra, for that reason (chanting of Hayagriba mantra sitting on bamboo seat is prohibited in tantra shastra, and thus results with negative effects—poverty) he was poor throughout the life even though he was the dewan (administrative officer) of the king of Nayagarh. He composed invocations and prayers for Lord Jagannath, the deity of Jagannath Temple at Puri. His noted works include two longer poems in ornate riti-kal style, Raghava Vilasa and Prabandha Purnachandra.

Jadumani was a great opponent of Brahmins (one of the four casts among Hindus) for their monopoly in Hindu rituals and misguiding the public in the name of dharma (religion). To teach Brahmins a lesson, he once invited a group of vedanti Brahmins on one of the anniversary of his late father and applauded them with lavish meals. After the bhojan (eating of meals), he told them that his late father had always a wish to see to have chadoos (a lining on the forehead with a hot rod of any kind by lightly touching) on the foreheads of Brahmins, and thus applied with a gold stick the chadoos on the Brahmins and the Brahmins could not deny that due to fear of raj danda (punishment by king's men)as he was the dewan of the then king. Since all the Brahmins on that occasion were very much ardent in vedant philosophy, it hurt them so much that on the same day at noon on the bank of Kusumi river, the 108 Brahmins chanted the bramha gayatri (principal gayatri mantra) with tears rolling from their eyes due to that great insult. All of a sudden a great lightning appeared on the cloud and burst upon Jadumani's only son Bhartuhari and he died on the moment. Jadumani later repented on that event of insulting Brahmins and went to Puri to see lord Jagannath and sang a song named Jagannath janana (a devotional poem on Jagannath).

His satirist-humorous poems known as Jadumani Rahasya and anecdotes of his wit and practical jokes are also popular. Though he does not have a complete work to his credit as a humorist, some 100 short and witty compositions have remained in circulation and part of oral folklore, they were collected as Jadumani Rahasya, and later in Jadumani granthabali (Collected works) in 1965.

He was a contemporary of Kabisurjya Baladeba Ratha. Once when he was in Puri at lord Jagannath temple while offering his prayer for his son's death, he met Baladeba Ratha who was also singing the sarpa janana (a song comparing Jagannath with a snake) after his son's death. Both great poets of Odisha knew each other from the caliber of each one's song (the depth and meaning of the song which are very high).

It is said that he once asked a question to the elderly Bakrabak Chakrapani Pattanayaka who had first asked a question to Jadumani. Jadumani easily answered the question put by Chakrapani but the latter could not provide the former's. For readers fond of riti kavya (classic poetry—ornamented with word mastery), below is that very question asked by Utkal Ghanta Jadumani Mohapatra.

chhabire ke jine nava rabinki
ke peta poshe dhanusara biki
jala prati veeti kahar neeti
kara bhaya nahin uraga prati
bichari kahib chari padartha eka hoi thiba

Translation:

who defeats the morning sun in his color
who lives his life by selling his weapon
who always fears to water
who does not have fear to snake
tell in one word the answer of the four questions above.

The answer to the above question is abira (or fagu / falgu in Odiya or color used in Holi). The meaning justifies as follows: abira's vibrant color defeats the color of the sun (Answer 1), 'abira' means who is not bira (or warrior) he can sell his weapon to earn a living (Answer 2), 'abira' = abi (goat in Odiya)+ ra (possessive)meaning that goat always fears to go near to water (Answer 3), and 'abira' = (a (vishnu)+bi (pakshi or [bird])+ ra (possessive)) which means Garuda the vahana of Lord Vishnu who never fears snakes (Answer 4). This single question raised as a poem shows the versatility of Jadumani's word mastery and the depth and breadth of his poetry.

There are many books written about Jadumani and his literature. Many books were written about his witty replies to people. One of such books is Utkala Ghanta Jadumanikruta Prabandha Purnachandra ra Chandrakanti Tika, written by ୰Pandita Chandramani Pradhan and Dr. Sukanti Mohanty, resident of Itamati, Dist. Nayagarh district.

Jadumani died in 1868 in the village Itamati, Dist. Nayagarh district.
