= Itamati =

Itamati Jadumani Nagar
- Village
- Location in Odisha, India
- Coordinates: 20°8′N 85°9′E
- Country: India
- State: Odisha
- District: Nayagarh
- Elevation: 122 m (400 ft)

Languages
  - Official: Oriya
- Time zone: UTC+5:30 (IST)
- PIN: 752068
- Nearest city: Nayagarh
- Website: odisha.gov.in

Itamati is a village in Nayagarh district of Odisha, India, 6 km from Nayagarh town.

== Demographics ==
As of 2011 India census, Itamati has a population of 71640. Males constitute 53% (37,987) of the population and females 47% (33,654). Itamati has an average literacy rate of 76%, higher than the national average of 59.5%. 10% of the population is under 6 years of age.

== Notable people ==
- Jadumani Mahapatra (1783-1868), poet.
