= Jhartarbha =

Village in Odisha, India

- Village
- Country: India
- State: Odisha
- District: Subarnapur
- Time zone: UTC+05:30 (IST)
- PIN: 767016

Jhartarbha is a village in Subarnapur, Odisha, India.

== Transport ==
The village will be served by the Khurda Road–Bolangir line via the Jhartarbha railway station.
