= Tarabalo =

Region in Odisha, India

- Location within Odisha
- Interactive map of Tarabalo
- Location: Nayagarh district, Odisha, India
- Coordinates: 20.14°N 85.19°E
- Type: Sulfur

Tarabalo is known for a cluster of hot springs dotted over an area of 8 acres. Tarabalo is located in Nayagarh district of Odisha. Sulphur water of the springs having certain medicinal properties is believed to be useful for a long time treatment of skin diseases and also related to religious rituals.

Besides the clusters of hot sulfur springs, Tarabalo is also known for its scenery makes it a picnic spot.

Tarabalo is a small settlement surrounded by large agricultural tracts. It is located 75 kilometres from Odisha's capital city of Bhubaneshwar.
