= Sidhamula =

Sidhamula Siddhamela
- village
- Location in Odisha, India
- Coordinates: 20.39°N 85.11°E
- Country: India
- State: Odisha
- District: Nayagarh
- Elevation: 66 m (217 ft)

Population (2011)
  - Total: 2,829

Languages
  - Official: Odia
- Time zone: UTC+5:30 (IST)
- PIN: 752078
- Telephone code: 06757
- Vehicle registration: OD-25

Sidhamula is a village in Nayagarh district. It is a Gram Panchayat under the Khandapara block. The villages in the Sidhamula panchayat include Sidhamula, Balaramprasad, Ghodamaridwar (Duargaon), Rajakiari, Kanasingh, Barapurikia, Hatiapalli and Nagajhar.

== Tourism ==
The Gokulananda Tourism Center is situated on the bank of river Mahanadi. This tourism center consists of Gokulananda temple, an attached picnic area. The temple is on the top of the hill. It is founded by late Sri Baba Swami Ram Laxman Dash Maharaja. It is nice to watch the panoramic view of the hill and flowing water of Mahanadi from the hill as well as from Sidhamula bridge. The hill is full of tall trees and medicinal plants. There is nearly 1 km of plane surface full of greenery on bottom of the hill on the bank of river Mahanadi suitable for cooking as well as playing games which attracts most of the local and nearby district tourists to this place.

Nearby places of interest
Name	Famous For
Kantilo	Nilamadhab Temple
Sarankul	Ladukeswar Temple
Odagaon	Raghunath Temple
Dutikeswar	Shiv Temple
Daspalla	Kuanria Dam
Ranapur	Maninageswari Temple
Satokasia	Sanctuary
Baisipalli	Sanctuary
