= Fategarh =

Fategarh may refer to the following localities in India:

- Fategarh, Odisha
- Fatehgarh, Uttar Pradesh
- Fatehgarh, Bhiwani, Haryana
- Fatehgarh Churian, Punjab
- Fatehgarh Sahib, Punjab
- Sirhind-Fategarh, Punjab

== See also ==
- Fatehgadh, Gujarat
