= Odogaon Raghunath Temple =

Hindus Temple

Coordinates: 20°1′32.4876″N 84°58′51.47″E

Odagaon Raghunath Temple9938373266,,9337666268

Odagaon Raghunath Temple is a Hindu temple dedicated to Lord Rama in the town of Odagaon, Nayagarh district of Odisha in India.

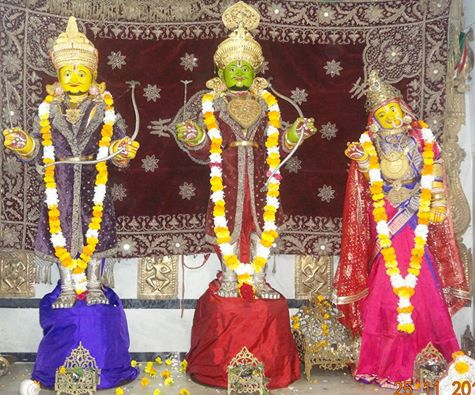
Lord Raghunath Odagaon 9938373266,,9337666268

The temple dates back from the Middle Ages and is an important pilgrimage centre in Odisha. It is built in a typical Kalinga style of architecture and is topped by 3 golden kalashas.

An important festival occurs here on Rama Navami.
