= Kantabania =

Kantabania Kantabania Shasan Abhyanarendrapur Shasan
- Village
- Location in Orissa, India Kantabania (India)
- Coordinates: 20.068275°N 85.114077°E
- Country: India
- State: Orissa
- District: Nayagarh

Area
  - Total: 0.62 km^{2} (0.24 sq mi)

Population
  - Total: 494
  - Density: 796/km^{2} (2,060/sq mi)

Languages
  - Official: Oriya
- Time zone: UTC+5:30 (IST)
- Postal code: 752070
- Vehicle registration: OD-25
- Nearest city: Nayagarh
- Sex ratio: 1:1 ♂/♀
- Literacy: 98%
- Lok Sabha constituency: puri
- Website: https://www.kantabaniashasan.com

Kantabania Sasana is a village in the Nayagarh district, Odisha, India. The village is only 9 km from the district headquarters. It is connected by road to Nayagarh and other nearby towns and villages. Agriculture, teaching, puja and rituals were the main professions of people in Kantabanian in the 1980s and 1990s.

Places near this village:

Giri Govardhan Temple (Gamei mundia)
