= Bolagarh =

- Village
- Location in Odisha, India Bolagarh (India)
- Coordinates: 20°11′0″N 85°16′0″E
- Country: India
- State: Odisha
- District: Khordha
- Tehsil: Bolagarh
- Elevation: 20 m (66 ft)

Population (2009)
  - Total: 18,000

Languages
  - Official: Odia
- Time zone: UTC+5:30 (IST)
- Postal code: PIN
- Vehicle registration: OD
- Lok Sabha constituency: Bhubaneswar
- Vidhan Sabha constituency: Begunia
- Website: odisha.gov.in

Bolagarh is a village and a block in Khordha in the Indian state of Odisha. It is the headquarter of Bolagarh Tehsil. National Highway 224 (New NH 57) passes through the village.

== Geography ==
Bolagarh is a village located in the Khordha district of Odisha state, India.

== Language ==
Most people in Bolargarh speak Odia.

== Weather and climate ==
Bolagarh's highest daytime temperature in the summer is between 30 °C to 42 °C . The average temperatures of January is 21 °C, February is 24 °C, March is 29 °C, April is 31 °C, May is 32 °C .

== Places of note ==
- Ghanashyam-Pindika museum

== Education ==
Education facilities in the town include:

- Paramanda College
- Baman High School
- Govt Girls High School
- sagarguan nodal high school

There are also some private schools:

- Saraswati Shisu Mandir
- Vivekananda Shikhya Kendra
- Sai Sahara International School

Bankoi High School

== Transport ==
The nearest airport to Bolgarh is Biju Pattanaik International Airport, which is 58 km (36 mi) away.

== See also ==
- Nayagarh
- Khordha
- Atri (hot spring)
- Maa Barunei Temple
