= Sarankul =

Village in Odisha

Coordinates: 20°03′N 85°05′E

Sarankul is a small town under the district Nayagarh of Odisha. This has one famous temple called Ladubaba.Ladukesh Temple is situated at the foot hill of Bhandar hill which is known to be Ammunition storage point of Mythiological BANASURA.This deity is offered with 66 dishes of Various Bhogs. Mandua Panaa is special bhog which is known for having special property to cure mental disorders. Maha shivaratree Popularly known as Jagara Yatra is celebrated every year on Odia Calendar day (Falguna Shukla Chaturdasi). One popular scenic tourist spot Jhadeswari is situated at the Bhandar valley.Famous Salia Water fall is another attraction of Sarankul.
