= Odagaon =

- Town
- Location in Odisha, India Odagaon (India)
- Coordinates: 20.016097°N 84.987659°E
- Country: India
- State: Odisha
- District: Nayagarh

Government
  - Type: Notified area council
  - Body: INDIAN PARLIAMENTARY GROUP

Area
  - Total: 544 km^{2} (210 sq mi)
- Elevation: 32 m (105 ft)

Population (2011)
  - Total: 5,401
  - Density: 9.93/km^{2} (25.7/sq mi)

Languages
  - Official: Odia
- Time zone: UTC+5:30 (IST)
- PIN: 752081
- Telephone code: 06753
- Vehicle registration: OD 25
- Nearest city: Nayagarh
- Literacy: 70%
- Website: odisha.gov.in

Odagaon is a town and Notified area council in the Nayagarh district of the Indian state of Odisha. It is the location of the Lord Raghunath Temple. The Shriram Navami festival of Odagaon is one of the renowned festival in Odisha. It is the third largest block in the district consisting of 32 Panchayats and more than 200 villages. One of the main attractions of the place is the Raghunath Temple. New Jagannath Sadak connects Odagaon with holy city Puri.

== Places of interest ==
=== Raghunath Jeu Temple ===
Raghunath Jeu Temple

Odagaon is known for the Temple of Lord Raghunath Jeu and for three subarna kalsh which is made up of 45 kg. gold, which is second to Sri Kshetra. The annual festival Ramanavami Yatra is held at the temple and lasts for nine days. Festival attractions include Yatra (live stage show) and Ravan Podi.

=== Dutikeswar Temple ===
There is a Siva Temple about 35 km from Nayargh town on the Nayagarh-Bahadajhola, via Odagaon road.

=== Budhabudhiani Dam ===
The Budhabudhiani Dam, 20 km from Nayargh district, provides nearby villages with clean water and is also used for fish farming .

=== Sagar Park ===
A park has been built near the Sagar pond for recreation purpose.
