= Nilamadhav Temple =

Vishnu temple in Odisha

Coordinates: 20.364629°N 85.195096°E

Nilamadhaba Temple, Kantilo
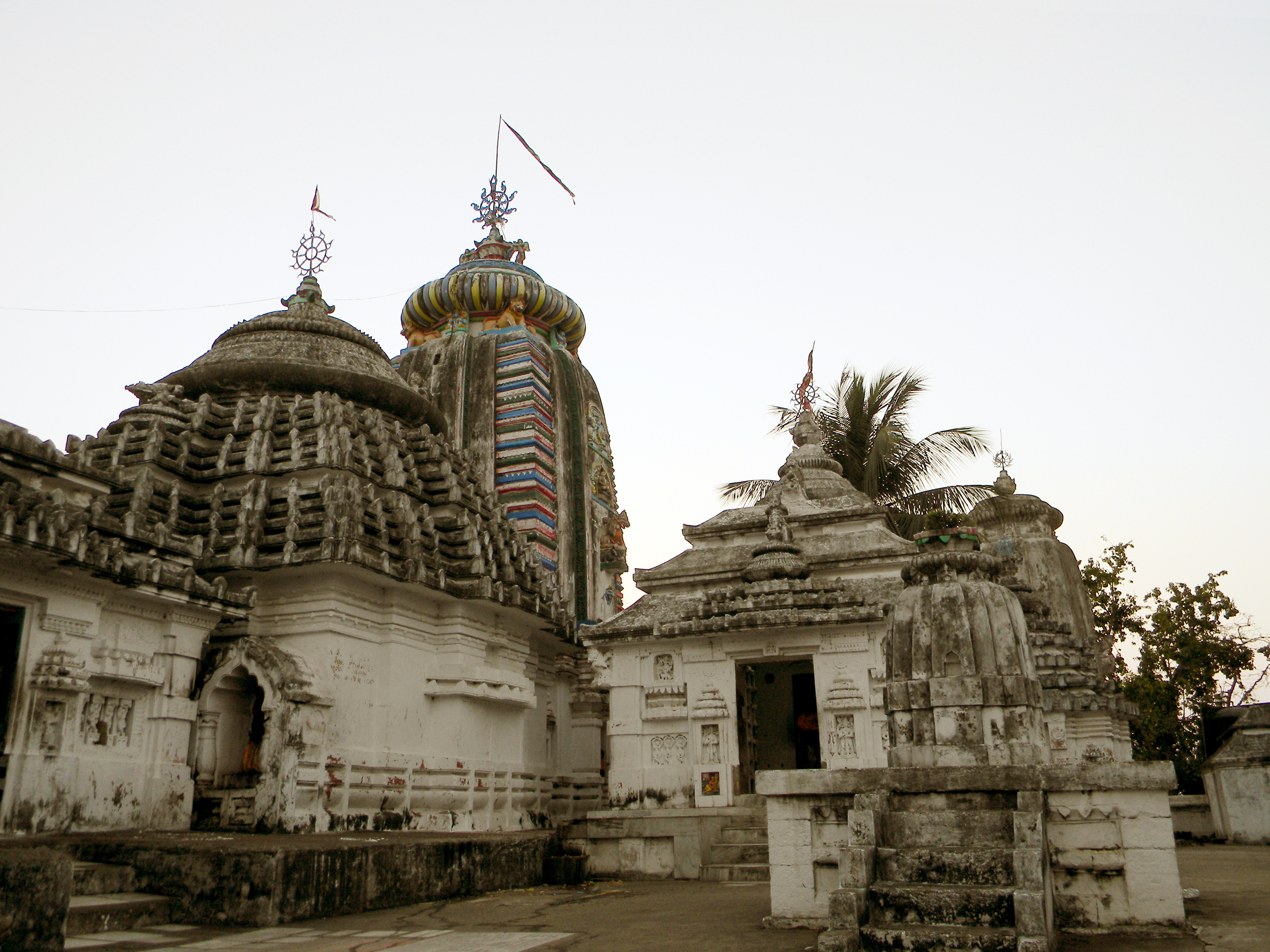

Religion
- Affiliation: Hinduism
- District: Nayagarh

Location
- Location: Kantilo
- State: Odisha
- Country: India
- Interactive map of Nilamadhaba Temple, Kantilo

Nilamadhava Temple (Odia: ନୀଳମାଧବଜିଉ ମନ୍ଦିର, କଣ୍ଟିଲୋ) is a Vishnu temple near the Mahanadi River, in Kantilo, Odisha, India.

== See also ==
- Jagannath
- Madhava (Vishnu)
