= Rajsunakhala =

Coordinates: 20.169731°N 85.333177°E

Rajsunakhala (ରାଜସୁନାଖଳା) is a census town in Nayagarh district of Indian state Odisha. It was declared a census town in the 2011 census. It is 60 km away from Bhubaneswar, the capital of Odisha. This is the gateway of Nayagarh district for Khurda road - Bolangir railway line. This serves as a major trading point in the region.

== History ==
It was a part of the erstwhile princely state of Raj-Ranpur, Odisha which was a part of Odisha tributary states under British India. On 1 April 1936, Odisha province was created with six districts namely Balasore, Cuttack, Puri, Ganjam, Koraput, Sambalpur. Meanwhile in 1933, Ranpur merged with Eastern States Agency. In turn, it was directly administered by viceroy instead of governor of Odisha province. After independence, many princely states merged with Odisha province. Per se, Ranpur was merged with Odisha. Rajsunakhala as a part of Ranpur princely state came under Puri district after Ranpur was merged with Odisha. In 1993, then chief minister Biju Pattanaik formed 17 new districts to make 30 districts from 13. Nayagarh was one of those newly formed districts. Since 1993, Rajsunakhala has been under Nayagarh district.

== Education ==
District Institute of Education and Training, Nayagarh is located in this place. Apart from this, there are many old government schools and private schools. Prominent Government schools include Government Highschool, Rajsunakhala, Somanath Senior Basic School, Rajsunakhala. St. Xavier's school, Saraswati Sisu Mandir, Aurobindo Purnanga Siksha Kendra are major private schools that are established in order to impart education. In addition, There is Rajsunakhala College for the higher education in arts and science. There is a library named Vivek Pathagara that immensely helps the poor students in preparing themselves for appearing in various competitive examinations for different posts of Government.And there are so many private/Govt schools including play schools for children also available in the town. Mostly the students who are living near to the town, they also depends on Rajsunakhala for study.

== Health ==
A Community Health Center (CHC) is in operation in a 4 storeyed building. Inhabitants of this place and the places surrounding this depend on this CHC for primary health care services. This apart, there are private clinics in order to take care of patients.

== Transportation ==
Rajsunakhala is endowed with two robust modes of transportation. One, road transport. Two, rail transport. NH57 that connects eastern Odisha with Western Odisha passes through this place. This place is a major stoppage on this route. Khurda road- Bolangir railway also passes through this place.
