= Atri, Odisha =

Village in the Khurda district of Odisha, India

Atri
- Location within Odisha Location within India
- Location: Khurda district, Odisha, India
- Coordinates: 20.15°N 85.30°E
- Temperature: ?

Atri is a small village located in the Khordha district of Odisha, India, approximately 15 km west of Khordha. The nearest airport is located in Bhubaneswar, while the closest railway station is Khurda Road Junction Railway Station.

It is famous for its hot springs. In December 2025, the locals and tourists urged the government to repair and develop the tourist spots in Atri.
