= Baisipalli Wildlife Sanctuary =

Wildlife sanctuary in Odisha, India

- IUCN category IV (habitat/species management area)
- Location within Odisha Location within India
- Interactive map of Baisipalli Wildlife Sanctuary
- Location: Nayagarh, Odisha, India
- Coordinates: 20°27′N 84°45′E
- Area: 168.35 square kilometres (41,600 acres)
- Established: 6 May 1981

Baisipalli Wildlife Sanctuary was created on 6 May 1981 and is located in Nayagarh, Odisha, India, adjacent to the Satkosia Gorge Wildlife Sanctuary. It is 168.35 square kilometres (41,600 acres) of sanctuary land, home to bear, elephant, leopard, sambar deer and spotted deer.

The sanctuary is located where the Mahanadi River passes through a gorge in the Eastern Ghats mountains. Elevations range from near sea level to about 900 metres (3,000 ft).

Baisipalli is located in the Eastern Highlands moist deciduous forests ecoregion. The two major plant communities are mixed deciduous forests including Sal (Shorea robusta) and riverine forest.

In 2007, the Satkosia Tiger Reserve was designated, which comprises Baisipali and the adjacent Satkosia Gorge Wildlife Sanctuary.

Due to its flora and fauna and beautiful landscapes, this sanctuary is an ideal tourist destination.
