= Chandapur =

- Village
- Location in Odisha, India Chandapur (India)
- Coordinates: 20.355994°N 86.158819°E
- Country: India
- State: Odisha
- District: Nayagarh

Population (2011)
  - Total: 5,200

Languages
  - Official: Oriya
- Time zone: UTC+5:30 (IST)
- Vehicle registration: OD
- Website: odisha.gov.in

Chandapur is a village in Nayagarh district in the state of Odisha, India.

== Demographics ==
As of 2001 India census, Chandapur had a population of 5260. Males constitute 51% of the population and females 49%. Chandapur has an average literacy rate of 70%, higher than the national average of 59.5%; with male literacy of 76% and female literacy of 63%. 10% of the population is under 6 years of age.
