= Banigocha =

Village in Odisha, India

Banigochha
- Interactive map of Banigochha
- Coordinates: 20.3995°N 84.5857°E
- Country: India
- State: Odisha
- District: Nayagarh

Banigochha (also romanized as Baniguchha) is a village in Odisha.
