= Athagada Patna =

- Village
- Location in Ganjam, Odisha, India
- Coordinates: 19.6030°N 84.8164°E
- Country: India
- State: Odisha
- District: Ganjam

Languages
  - Official: Odia
- Time zone: UTC+5:30 (IST)
- PIN: 761105
- Telephone code: 06822
- Vehicle registration: OR-07; OD-07

Athagada Patna is a village in Ganjam district, Odisha, India.

Athagadapatna is a historic place situated about 62 km from Ganjam, in Ganjam District. The place has witnessed many historical incidents in the past. It is the birth place of the famed Oriya poets Kabisurya Baladev Rath and Kabi Jadumani Mahapatra.

Legend is that, the King of Athagada had once given shelter to the Gajapati King of Puri and had kept the idol of Lord Jagannath in a secret place somewhere in his kingdom during the massive attack by Kalapahada.

Major point of attraction here is the 16th century Lord Jagannath Temple, built amidst mountains along with a cluster of temples. The unspoiled beauty of the area attracts tourist from far and near.

Accommodation facilities are available at Kabisuryanagar (10 km), Aska (20 km) and Berhampur (60 km).

Athagadapatna is on the State Highway from Aska to Bhubaneswar route. Khallikote Railway Station, on South Eastern Railways, is the nearest railhead (30 km).
