= Dashapalla =

Daspalla
- Town
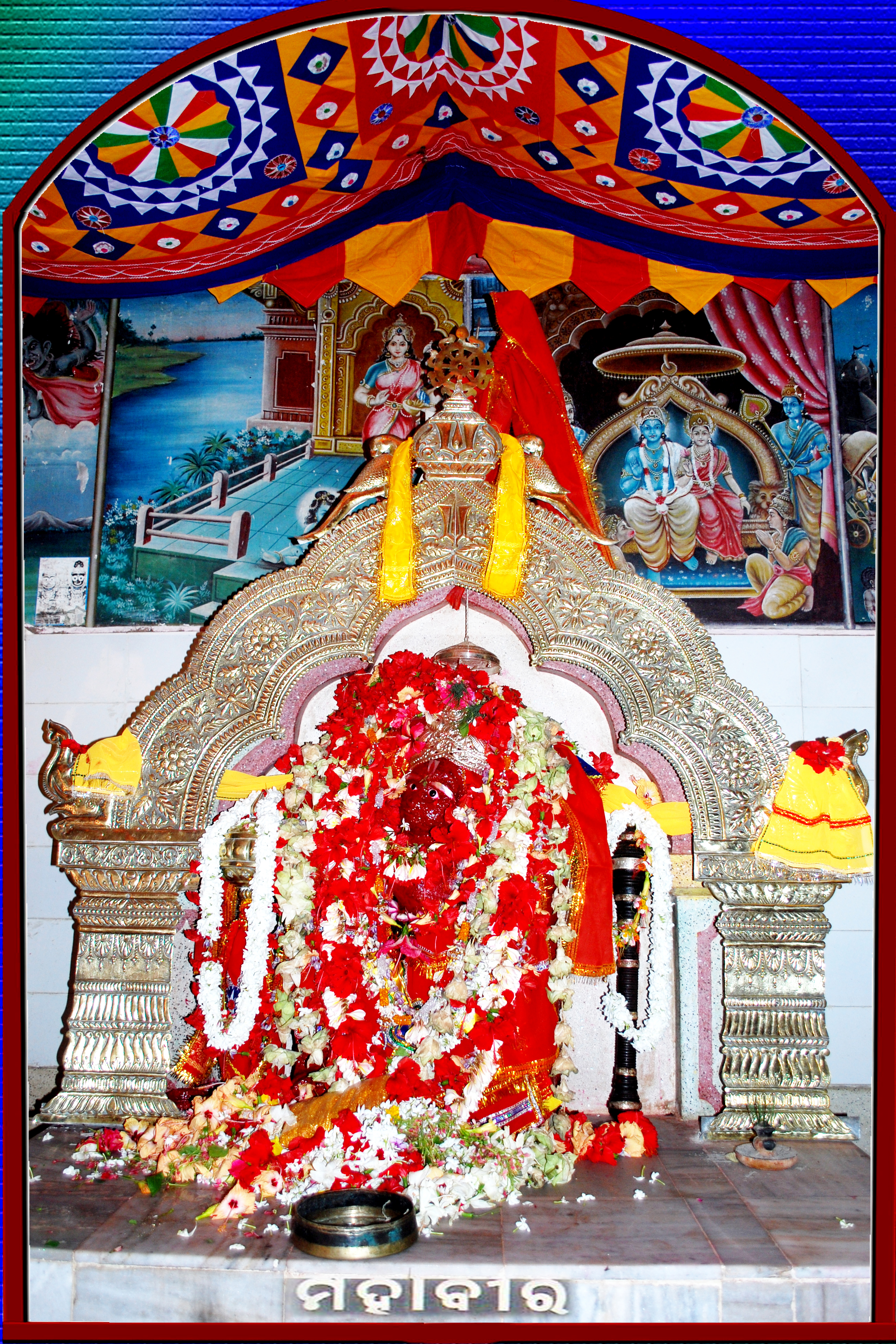
- Lord Mahaveer (Hanuman) inside the Mahaveer temple at Daspalla, Nayagarh

- Location in Nayagarh, Odisha, India Daspalla (India)
- Coordinates: 20°21′N 84°51′E
- Country: India
- State: Odisha
- District: Nayagarh
- Elevation: 122 m (400 ft)

Languages
  - Official: Odia
- Time zone: UTC+5:30 (IST)
- PIN: 752084
- Telephone code: 06757
- Vehicle registration: OD 25
- Nearest city: Gania, Nayagarh, Khandapada
- Lok Sabha constituency: Kandhamal
- Website: odisha.gov.in

Dashapalla, also known as Daspalla, is an archaeologically important site situated in Nayagarh district, Odisha, India.

== History ==
Available records, writings, books reveal that at first there was no such place known as Daspalla. Rather it was a part of Boudh State ruled by Bhanj Kings. During the rule of Bira Bhanj there was a rift in between Bira Bhanj and his cousin, Sal Bhanj. The dissident Sal Banj left Boudh and proceeded to meet the Gajapati of Puri through the ages old Jagannath Sadak. While resting with his followers at Padmlatola Forest, the king of Nayagarh got the news and made alliance with Sal Bhanj and declared him the king of that area. Getting the news, Bir Bhanj of Boudh got angry and sent a troop to capture Sal Bhanj. But the troop of Boudh got defeated at the hands of Sal Bhanj and Nayagarh soldiers. As Sal Bhanj got Yasha (Fame), he named his kingdom as Yashpalla or Daspalla. Other historians tell that king Sal Bhanj had only das (oriya for 10) Pallies (villages) so Daspalli got renamed as Daspalla. This incident took place in 1495. King Sal Bhanj ruled for 3 years only and then his son Naran Bhanj ascended the throne.

But records found at Boudh state reveal that Daspalla was formed by Naran Bhanj in 1498 during the reign of Siddya Bhanj. However, it is a fact that Daspalla was formed during the last part of 15th century being separated from Baudh.

The headquarters of Daspalla changed from Badmul to Gania, Gania to Madhyakhand, Madhyakhand to Puruna Daspalla. The ninth king of Daspalla Padmanav Bhanj, during hunting, saw a wonderful thing that a wild dove was hunting and defeating a Chhanchan (Bird of prey). So, he thought the place a heroic one and decided to change his capital to that place. At that time there was a Kandha chieftain named Kunj Malik. King Padmanav Bhanj defeated Kunj Malik and started his capital here but after the name of Kunja Malik the capital got named as Kunjabanagarh.

Guri Charan Deo Bhanj was crowned ruler in 1803. He was succeeded by a line of titular Rajas.

- 1861 – 1873 Narsimha Bhanj
- 1873 – 1896 Chaitan Deo Bhanj
- 1896 – 1913 Narayan Deo Bhanj
- 1913 – 15 Aug 1947 Kishor Chandra Deo Bhanj (b. 1908)

== Geography ==
Geaographically, it is located at 20°21′0″N 84°51′0″E at an elevation of 122 m (400 ft) above mean sea level (MSL).

During pre-independence era it was a small garhjat (princely state) named as Daspalla State with headquarters at Kunjabanagarh. Its boundary touches the district border of Cuttack, Angul, Boudh, Kandhamal and Ganjam. The Daspalla state has been divided into two Blocks namely Daspalla and Gania.

Previously, Daspalla State was divided into 14 parganas with a Sardar as its chief. Daspalla is a place of hills and mountains, forests, streams, rivers, falls, gorge, wild growth and wild animals predominantly occupied by Tribals of Kandha and Khaira Tribe. Presently, Daspalla Block has 19 Gram Panchayats and Gania Block has 8 Gram Panchayats.

== Location ==
Daspalla is situated in the middle of Odisha. It is 127 kilometres (79 mi) from Bhubaneswar, the state capital, via Khurda and Nayagarh; 144 kilometres (89 mi) from Puri by New Jagannath Sadak, via RAJA-RANPUR, Nirakarpur and Chandanpur; 200 kilometres (120 mi) from Sambalpur via Rairakhol and Boudh; 140 kilometres (87 mi) from Berhampur via Aska and Bhanjanagar; 107 kilometres (66 mi) from Anugul via Hindol and Narasinghpur; 295 kilometres (183 mi) from Bhawanipatna via Kandhamal, Phulbani; and 200 kilometres (120 mi) from Bolangir via Subarnapur and Boudh.

National Highway 224 passes through Dashapalla. Nearest airport is Biju Patnaik Airport at Bhubaneswar. The nearest Railway station is Daspalla railway station.

=== Administration ===
Dashapalla falls under the Kandhamal (Lok Sabha constituency) and Daspalla (Odisha State Legislative Assembly).

Ramesh Chandra Behera is the Member of the Odisha Legislative Assembly (MLA) representing the Daspalla Assembly Constituency in Nayagarh district. He is from the Biju Janata Dal (BJD) and won the seat in the 2024 elections.

The Member of Parliament (MP) for the Kandhamal Lok Sabha Constituency is Sukanta Kumar Panigrahi of the Bharatiya Janata Party (BJP), elected in the 2024 general election.

== Festivals ==
Daspalla is famous for Lankapodi Yatra and Kuanria Mahotsav. The Lankapodi Yatra commences on the day of Ram Navami and continues for a fortnight. Lanka podi Yatra (festival) is celebrated across different places of the state, but Daspallah in Nayagarh district is the most popular and the oldest which continues to attract the admires of mythology and folk culture since 1802. The Kuanria Dam is a water reservoir for irrigation and fishery purpose with a deer park alongside which makes it a visiting and picnic place as well.

== Places of interest ==
- Satkosia Gorge – It is the deepest river Gorge of Odisha in the river Mahanadi. Its length is about 16 kilometres (9.9 mi) in between Angul and Daspalla boundary. The Gharial crocodile and many aquatic birds and animals are found here.

== Notable people ==
Daspalla bears the foot prints of a number of famous personalities. Some of them are following-

- Bhakta Charan Das – lived here at village Madhyakhanda for some time where he had started his famous book "Mathura Mangal"
- Jadumani Mahapatra had spent his childhood here at Daspalla, had his love and married here too. He has composed so many verses here
- Fakir Mohan Senapati – served here as dewan of Raja Chaitanya Bhanj Deo. Here he had written his famous Dhulia Baba story and many more
