= Gania, Nayagarh =

Village in Nayagarh District, Odisha, India

Gania
- Village
- Location within Odisha Location within India
- Coordinates: 20°24′09″N 85°02′34″E
- Country: India
- State: Odisha
- District: Nayagarh
- Tehsil: Gania

Area
  - Total: 2.62 km^{2} (1.01 sq mi)
- Elevation: 225 m (738 ft)

Population (2011)
  - Total: 2,213
  - Density: 845/km^{2} (2,190/sq mi)
- Time zone: UTC+5:30 (IST)
- PIN: 752085

Gania is a village in Gania Tehsil, Nayagarh District, Odisha, India. As of the year 2011, the village has a total population of 2,213.

== Geography ==
The village is situated on the eastern side of Gania Tehsil, on the southern bank of Mahanadi River. It is connected to the Gania-Daspalla Road. Its average elevation is 225 metres above the sea level.

== Climate ==
Gania has a Tropical Savanna Climate (Aw). It sees the least precipitation in December with 14 mm of average rainfall, and the most in July with 361 mm of average rainfall.

Climate data for Gania
Month	Jan	Feb	Mar	Apr	May	Jun	Jul	Aug	Sep	Oct	Nov	Dec	Year
Mean daily maximum °C (°F)	27.2 (81.0)	31.2 (88.2)	35.4 (95.7)	38.3 (100.9)	38.6 (101.5)	34.4 (93.9)	30.8 (87.4)	30.4 (86.7)	30.5 (86.9)	30.1 (86.2)	28.5 (83.3)	26.6 (79.9)	31.8 (89.3)
Daily mean °C (°F)	21.3 (70.3)	24.6 (76.3)	28.3 (82.9)	31 (88)	32.1 (89.8)	30.1 (86.2)	27.6 (81.7)	27.2 (81.0)	27.1 (80.8)	26.3 (79.3)	23.9 (75.0)	21.5 (70.7)	26.7 (80.2)
Mean daily minimum °C (°F)	15.9 (60.6)	18.6 (65.5)	22 (72)	24.9 (76.8)	26.8 (80.2)	26.7 (80.1)	25.3 (77.5)	25 (77)	24.6 (76.3)	22.8 (73.0)	19.4 (66.9)	16.6 (61.9)	22.4 (72.3)
Average rainfall mm (inches)	16 (0.6)	19 (0.7)	29 (1.1)	36 (1.4)	65 (2.6)	241 (9.5)	361 (14.2)	331 (13.0)	221 (8.7)	104 (4.1)	29 (1.1)	14 (0.6)	1,466 (57.6)
Source: Climate-Data.org

== Demographics ==
According to the result of the 2011 Indian Census, the village has a total of 555 households. Among the 2,213 residents, 1,142 are male, and 1,071 are female. Around 80.98% of the village population is literate, with 977 male residents and 815 female residents being literate. Its census location code is 405380.
