= Khurda Road Junction railway station =

Railway station in Odisha, India

Khurda Road Junction
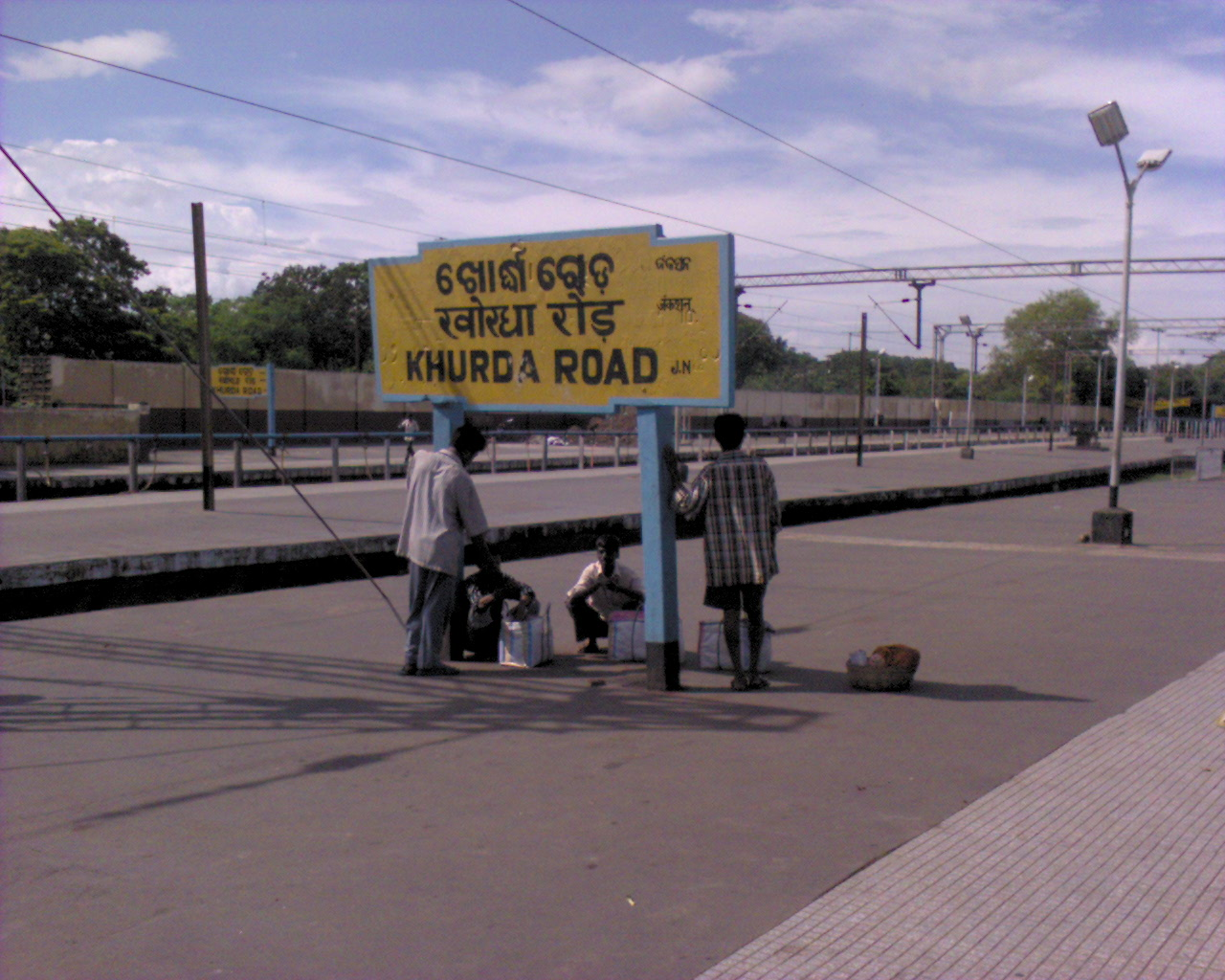

General information
- Location: Jatani, Khurda, Odisha; India
- Coordinates: 20°09′13″N 85°42′31″E
- Elevation: 43 m (141 ft)
- System: Indian Railways junction station
- Lines: Khurda Road–Puri line, Khurda Road–Visakhapatnam section of Howrah–Chennai main line, Khurda Road–Bolangir line (under construction)
- Platforms: 7
- Tracks: 5 ft 6 in (1,676 mm) broad gauge

Construction
- Structure type: Standard (on-ground station)
- Parking: Available

Other information
- Status: Functioning
- Station code: KUR
- Zone(s): East Coast Railway
- Division(s): Khurda Road

History
- Opened: 1897; 129 years ago
- Former names: East Coast State Railway, Bengal Nagpur Railway

Services
Preceding station	Indian Railways	Following station
Retang towards Howrah Junction	East Coast Railway zone Howrah–Chennai main line	Argul towards Chennai Central
Retang towards Kharagpur Junction	East Coast Railway zone Kharagpur–Puri line	Haripur Gram towards Puri
Terminus	East Coast Railway zone Khurda Road-Bolangir line (under construction)	Khurda Town towards Balangir
Location
- Location within Odisha Location within India

Khurda Road is a railway junction station of East Coast Railway Zone in the Indian state of Odisha.

== History ==
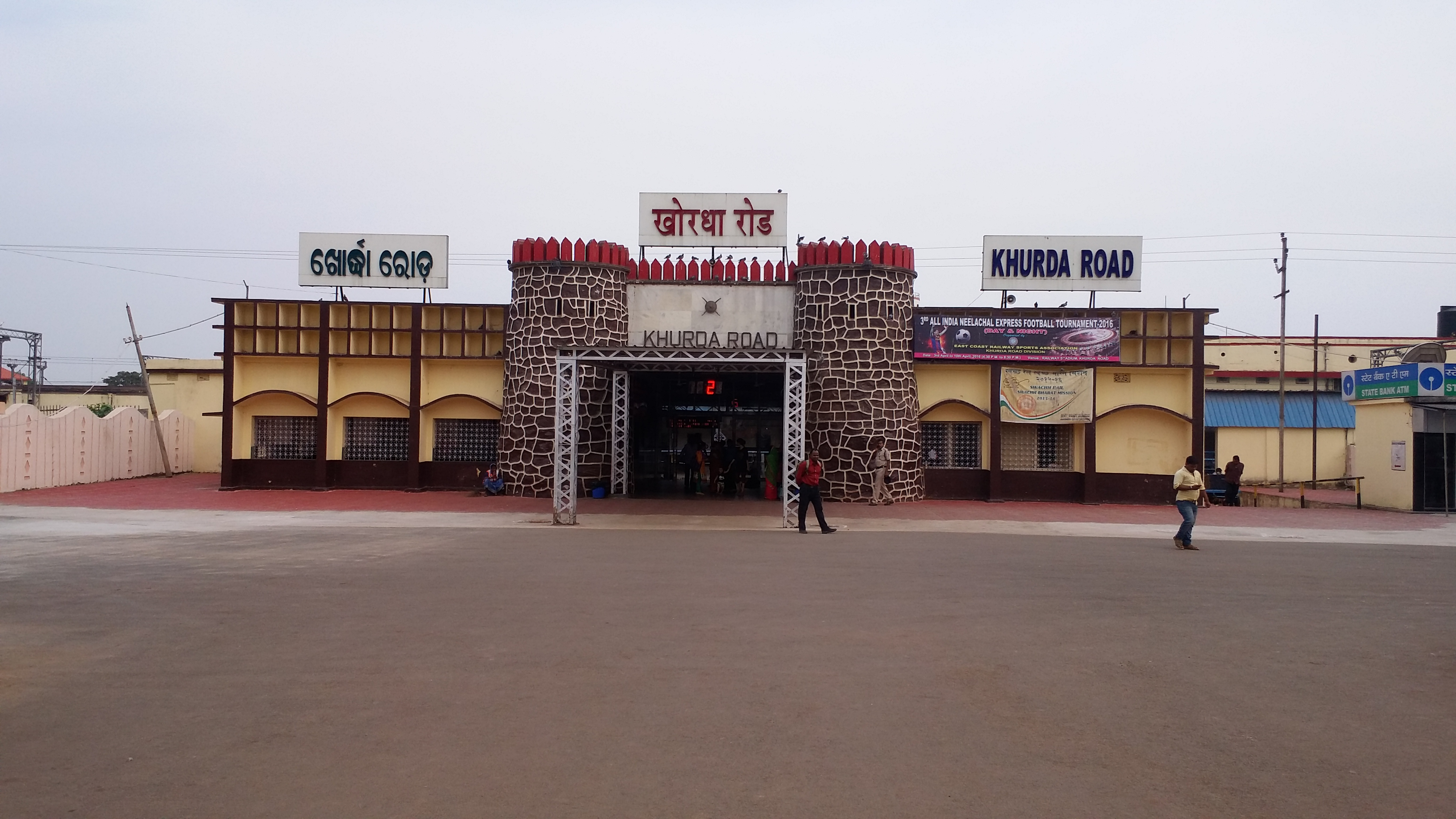
Khurda Road Railway Station

From 1893 to 1896, 1,287 km (800 mi) of East Coast State Railway was built and opened to traffic. It necessitated construction of some of the largest bridges across rivers like the Subarnarekha, Brahmani, Baitarani, Mahanadi, Kathajodi, Kuakhai and Birupa. Bengal Nagpur Railway's line to Cuttack was opened on 1 January 1899.

The Khurda Road–Puri section was opened to traffic on 1 February 1897.

The 514 km (319 mi) long northern section of the East Coast State Railway was merged with BNR in 1902.

=== Railway reorganisation ===
The Bengal Nagpur Railway was nationalized in 1944. Eastern Railway was formed on 14 April 1952 with the portion of East Indian Railway Company east of Mughalsarai and the Bengal Nagpur Railway. In 1955, South Eastern Railway was carved out of Eastern Railway. It comprised lines mostly operated by BNR earlier. Amongst the new zones started in April 2003 were East Coast Railway and South East Central Railway. Both these railways were carved out of South Eastern Railway.

== Railway Division ==
Khurda Road is one of the three divisions of East Coast Railway.
