= Khurda Road–Bolangir line =

Railway line in India

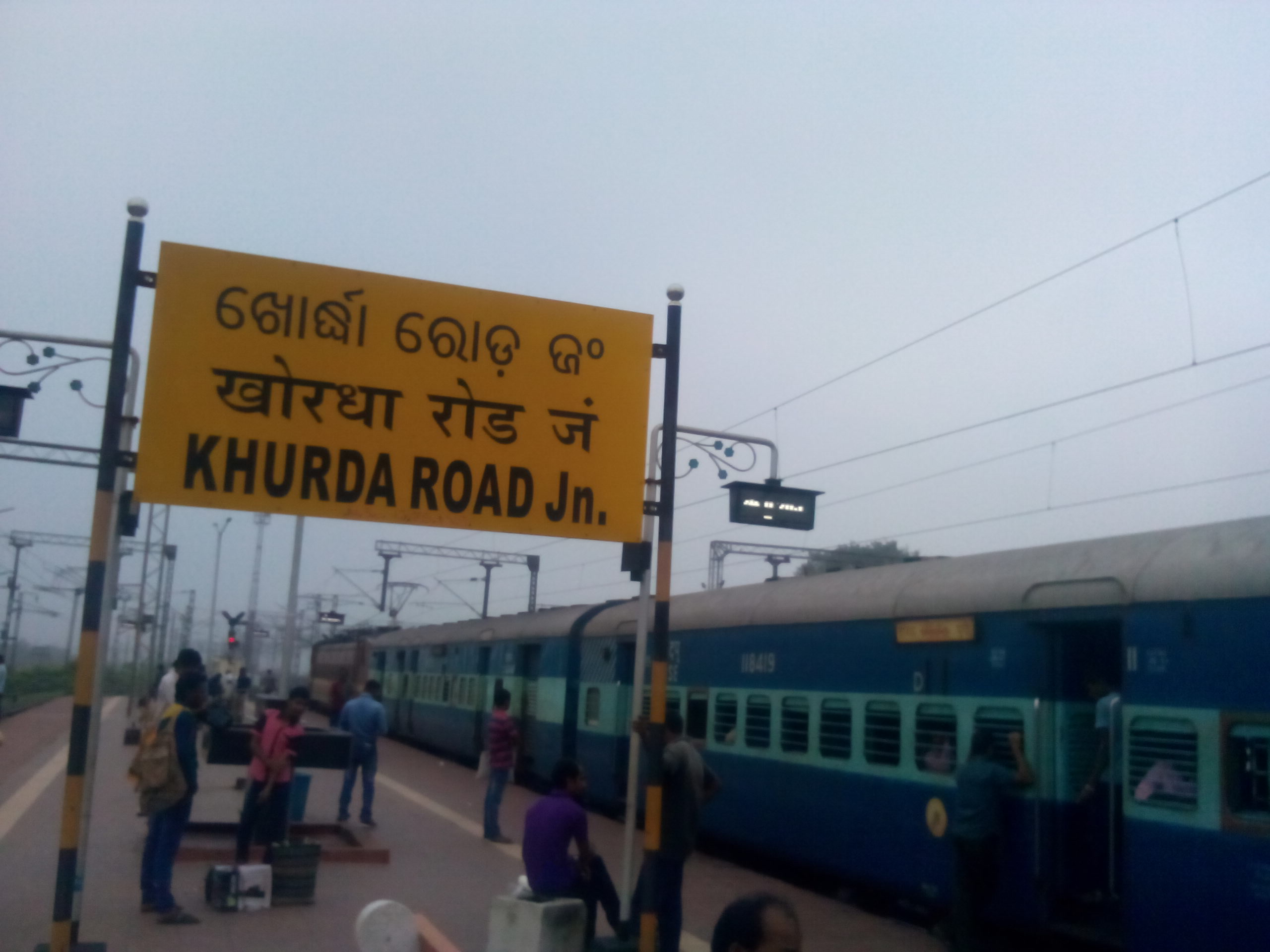
- Khurda Road, the starting station on Khurda Road–Bolangir line

Overview
- Status: Under construction
- Owner: Indian Railways
- Locale: Odisha
- Termini: Khurda Road; Balangir

Service
- Type: 1,676 mm (5 ft 6 in)
- Operator: East Coast Railway zone

Technical
- Line length: 227 km completed
- Track length: 306.25 km (190 mi)
- Number of tracks: 1
- Track gauge: 1,676 mm (5 ft 6 in)
- Electrification: work is under progress
- Operating speed: 130 km/h (81 mph)

The Khurda Road–Bolangir line is a rail line between Khurda Road Junction and Balangir which is under construction.

It has two completed sections–Bolangir to Puranakatak (122 km) and Daspalla to Khurda Road (105 km).

== History ==
It was surveyed in 1945 but the project was sanctioned in 1994–95. The state government has signed Memorandum of Understanding with Indian Railways to undertake some parts of the project on cost sharing basis.

The Khurda Road–Bolangir rail line will connect Khurda Road to Balangir in a shorter way through Daspalla.

In 2015–16 Rail Budget, the rail line got a green signal from Minister of Railways Suresh Prabhu as Rs 4682 crore was allotted for Odisha. As construction will be done in three phases, first between Khurda Road to Begunia a 36 km stretch then 76 km from Begunia to Daspalla and 194.25 km from Daspalla to Balangir via Phulbani and Bhainsapali under the review of Chief Minister of Odisha Naveen Patnaik.

This will connect Nayagarh, Boudh, Sonepur and Balangir which are economically backward districts in the state.

== Current status ==
The completion of the newly-laid broad gauge rail line of 10.65 km between Bichhupali and Jhartarbha of Khurda Road-Balangir rail line project was informed by the East Coast Railway (ECoR) on 10 November 2022. It was commissioned and inaugurated by Narendra Modi on 18 May 2023. A trial run was conducted between the two stations on 26 July 2023.

On 3 January 2024, the General Manager of the East Coast Railway (ECoR), Manoj Sharma, announced that the ECoR plans to extend the line by 73 km from Sonepur to Purunakatak in Boudh district by the end of 2024. Additionally, in a strategic move, the ECoR revised the project deadline to December 2026.

On 6 January 2024, Railway Minister Ashwini Vaishnaw inaugurated the Daspalla station in Odisha's Nayagarh district and the Nuagaon Road-Daspalla line.

On 3 February 2024, Prime Minister Narendra Modi inaugurated the Puri-Sonepur-Puri Weekly Express at an event in Sambalpur district. This new weekly train service commenced on 8 February, marking the inclusion of Sonepur district in the railway network map. The train from Puri to Sonepur will operate every Thursday, and the return journey from Sonepur to Puri will be available every Friday.

In a major boost for Boudh district, the PM inaugurated the 73-km-long Sonepur–Purunakatak railway line on 20 June 2025, a part of the larger 301-km Khurda Road–Balangir railway project.
