= Begunia =

Town in Odisha, India

- Town
- Location in Odisha, India Begunia (India)
- Coordinates: 20.201°N 85.451°E
- Country: India
- State: Odisha
- District: Khordha

Languages
  - Official: Odia
- Time zone: UTC+5:30 (IST)
- PIN: 758019
- Website: odisha.gov.in

Begunia is a town of the Khordha district and a Notified Area Council (NAC) of the Indian state of Odisha. Begunia is situated approximately 45 km away from Bhubaneswar, 18 km away from the district headquarters, Khordha, and 14 km away from Rajsunakhala. The Odisha State Highway (which is known as Khordha-Balangir) runs through this town, and also a Railway transport system is operational between Khordha Town Station and Begunia.

Begunia (Vidhan Sabha constituency) is the assembly constituency for this region. This constituency includes Begunia block and Bologarh block.

Hospital There is a subdistrict hospital in construction expected to complete in 2027. It's a 100-bedded hospital to provide health care to the nearby region
