= Khordha =

- City
- Location in Odisha, India Khordha (India)
- Coordinates: 20.18°N 85.62°E
- Country: India
- State: Odisha
- District: Khordha

Government
  - Type: Municipality
  - Body: Khordha Municipality
- Elevation: 75 m (246 ft)

Population (2011)
  - Total: 120,204

Languages
  - Official: Odia
- Time zone: UTC+5:30 (IST)
- PIN: 752055,752057,752056
- Telephone code: 06755
- Vehicle registration: OD-02
- Website: odisha.gov.in

Khordha is a city and a Municipality area in Khordha District in the Indian state of Odisha. Bhubaneswar, is the capital of Odisha located within the Khordha district and is only 25 km from Khordha town. Odisha State Highway 1 and National Highway 16 run via this town.

== Geography ==
Khordha is located at 20.18°N 85.62°E. It has an average elevation of 75 m (246 ft). Area of the district is 2,888 square kilometers (1,115 square miles). From climatological point of view, the average annual precipitation over the district is about 1,200–1,400 mm. Moderate temperature prevails over the area throughout the year barring the summer season (March–June), where the maximum temperature even exceeds 45 °C. The average minimum temperature over the district is 9.6 °C.

== Demographics ==
As of 2001 Indian census, Khordha had a population of 39,034. The population of Khordha, as estimated in late 2006(), was 42,526. Khordha had a population Census of 2011 total 120,204.

== Notable people ==
- Baidyanath Misra - former Vice-Chancellor of the Odisha University of Agriculture and Technology, Chairman of Odisha State Planning Board and Chairman of Odisha's First State Finance Commission.
- Godabarish Mishra - freedom fighter, writer, teacher
- Lokanath Misra - former Governor of Assam (1991–1997)
- Pragyan Ojha - cricketer
- J. B. Patnaik- former Governor of Assam, Former CM of Odisha
- Manasi Pradhan- recipient of 2013 Rani Lakshmibai Stree Shakti Puraskar

== Politics ==
Khordha is part of Bhubaneswar (Lok Sabha constituency). Current MLA from Khordha assembly constituency is prashant jagdev (BJP Candidate), who had also won this seat in 2024 state elections.

Previous MLAs from this seat were:

- Rajendra Kumar Sahoo who won it for BJD in 2014 election and as an independent candidate in 2009 state elections.
- Jyotindra Nath Mitra who won it for BJD in 2000 & 2004, and also as a candidate of INC(I) in 1980
- Janaki Ballabh Pattanaik of INC in 1985
- Sudarshan Mohanty of JNP in 1977.
