= Nayagarh =

- Town
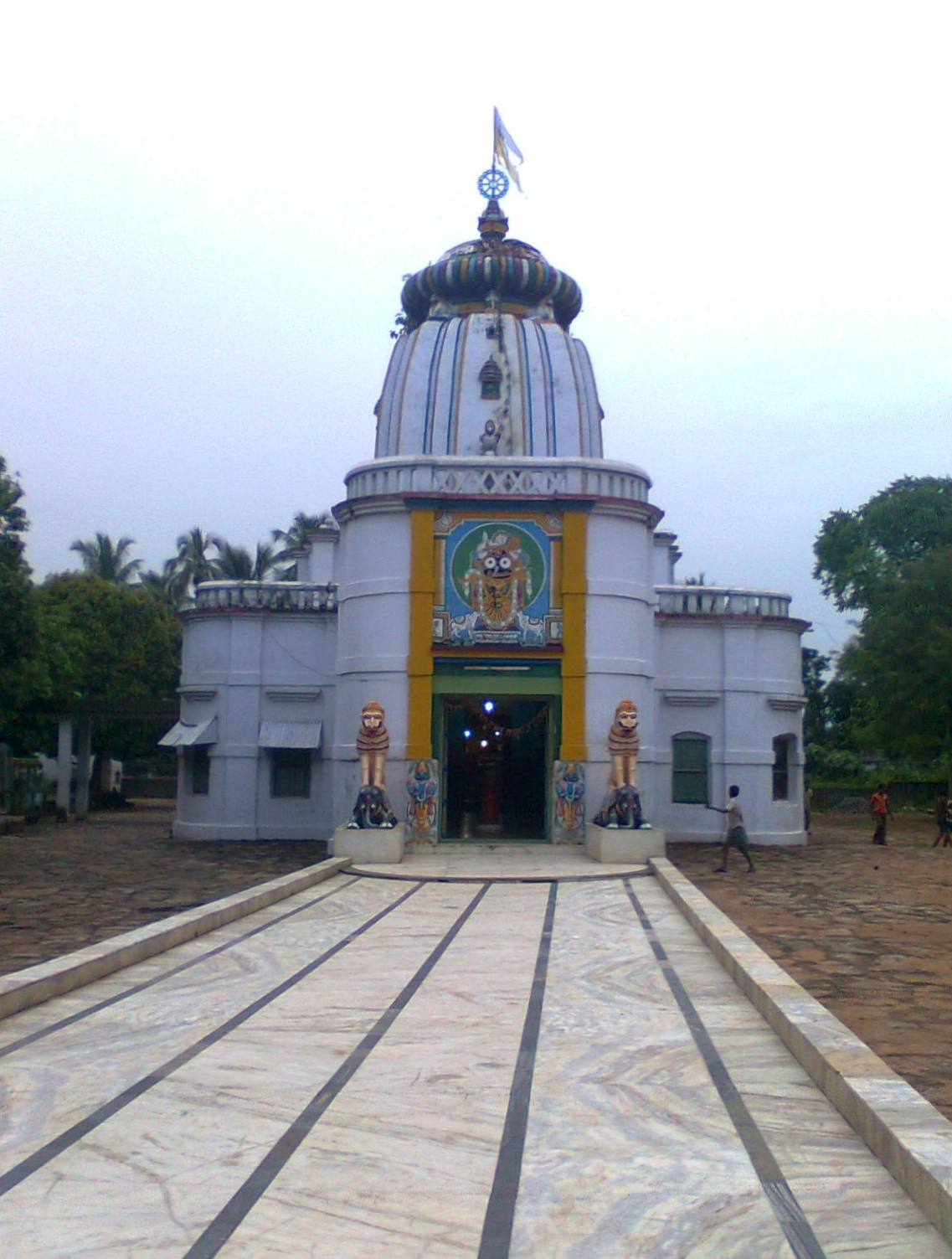
- Lord Jagannath Temple at Nayagarh

- Location in Odisha, India Nayagarh (India)
- Coordinates: 20.127°N 85.107°E
- Country: India
- State: Odisha
- District: Nayagarh

Government
  - Collector & District Magistrate: Madhumita Rath, IAS
- Elevation: 178 m (584 ft)

Population (2011)
  - Total: 9.63 lakhs (approx)

Languages
  - Official: Odia and English
- Time zone: UTC+5:30 (IST)
- PIN: 752 XXX
- Telephone code: 06753
- Vehicle registration: OD-25
- Nearest city: Khurda
- Literacy: 79.17%
- Lok Sabha constituency: 0
- Vidhan Sabha constituency: 4
- Website: www.nayagarhmunicipality.in

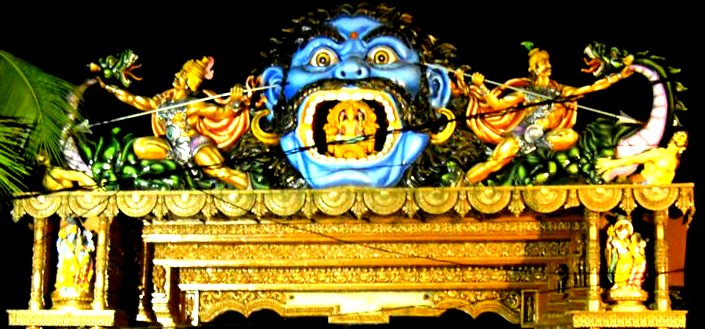
Maa Dakhinakali temple entrance, Nayagarh

Nayagarh is a town and the municipality headquarters of Nayagarh district in the Indian state of Odisha.

== Geography ==
Nayagarh is located at 20.13°N 85.1°E with an average elevation of 178 metres (584 feet).

It was the Rukhi mountain to the south and the Balaram mountain to the north of Nayagarh, which mitigated the effects of the 1999 Odisha cyclone on Nayagarh.

The 96 km long New Jagannath Sadak road, also known as Nua Jagannath Sadak, connects Nayagarh to the holy city in the Puri district.

== Demographics ==
A 2011 census in India revealed a population of 17,030 in Nayagarh town, 9,000 of which were male and 8,030 female. This indicated a population growth of 11.30% compared to the census data of 2001. While the census of 2001 when compared against the census of 1991, revealed a population growth of 10.46% in Nayagarh District.

The total area of the Nayagarh district covers approximately 3,890 km^{2} accommodating about 1,700 villages in the Nayagarh district.

The average literacy rate of the Nayagarh population was 79.17 in 2011, compared to 70.52 in 2001 (86.63 male and 71.08 female). This revealed an increase from the 2001 census, where figures stood at 82.66 (male) and 57.64 (female) in the Nayagarh District.

Total literates in Nayagarh district were 681,522, of which male and female were 387,632 and 293,890, respectively. In 2001, the total population of literates in Nayagarh district was 529,840.

With regard to sex ratio in Nayagarh, it stood at 916 females per 1000 males compared to 2001 census figure of 938. The average national female sex ratio in India is 940 per 1000 males as per the latest reports of Census 2011 Directorate.

In census enumeration, data regarding child under 0–6 years age were also collected for all districts including Nayagarh. There were total 101,337 children under the age of 0–6 against 113,180 of 2001 census. Of total 101,337, male and female were 54,759 and 46,578, respectively. Child sex ratio as per census 2011 was 851 compared to 904 of census 2001. In 2011, children under 6 formed 10.53% of Nayagarh District compared to 13.09% of 2001. There was a net change of −2.56% in this compared to the previous census of India.

Nayagarh district population constituted 2.29% of the total population of Odisha as per 2001 census.

== History ==
The history of the foundation of Nayagarh State in the thirteenth century is an important chapter in the political history of Odisha. Suryamani of Baghela dynasty came to Puri on a pilgrimage from "Rewa" of Madhya Pradesh and established his kingdom at Nayagarh. On the way to Puri, both Suryamani and his brother Chandramani took rest at night at Gunanati. The area was full of tigers and at night a tiger attacked him. Both the brothers fought the tiger and killed it. The local people praised the brave brothers and elected Suryamani as their leader. Suryamani gradually built his fort at Gunanati and married a Mali (a cast known as worshiper of Lord Shiv) girl. After the death of his first wife, he again married a Kshatriya girl. From there, he then attacked Haripur and Ralaba. While sleeping, a tiger attacked him at Ralaba; he again fought and killed it. At that moment, he saw a lady with an empty pot passed by to fetch water. Astonishingly, she returned with a little boy. Immediately, Suryamani obstructed the way of that lady and wanted to know about the mystery. The lady told she was Bouri Thakurani (a local worshiped goddess) and the tiger that the king killed was the boy. She advised Suryamani to kill her and worship her as his deity. From that date, Suryamani worshiped "Bauri Thakurani" at Ralaba and built his fort there and adopted Tiger Head as a state symbol.

Ninth king of this dynasty "Baghel Singh" (1480–1510) came on a hunting to a place in between Rukshi and Balaram mountains and saw a wonderful sight that a rabbit pressed down a dog there. After seeing this valorous act by the prey (rabbit) on the predator, he selected and shifted his capital to this place. As per his name, Nayagarh is also known as "Baghua Nayagarh" (Valorous Nayagarh). The place where such an event occurred is now known as "KukurTasara" ('kukur' means 'dog' and 'tasara' means a large piece of stone in Odia, where the pressing of the dog by the rabbit had occurred and hence the name).

12th King of Nayagarh was Raghunath Sing (1565–1595) who was highly powerful. During this time, Muslims had already captured Odisha and the atmosphere of the coastal Odisha was fully indiscipline. The last independent king Mukunda Dev (1565) was defeated in Gohritikira and died. By taking the advantages of the political situations of coastal Odisha, Raghunath Singh attacked Ranpur and captured Odagaon, Sarankul and Baunsiapara area from Ranpur estate and dispossessed Nayagarh-Daspalla border area from the King of Boudh and Sunamuhin area of Odgaon from the King of Ghumusar. He also captured a portion from Banpur. Before death, Ragunath Singh divided his estate between his three sons. Harihar Singh was in possession of Nayagarh and Jadunath Singh got four Khandagrams (large area of land) which was known as Khandapada later. Gadadhar Singh was the son of Harihar Singh. When he was engaged in a fight with Ranpur estate, the king of Ghumusar attacked Nayagarh. Pindik Patsahani of village Sunalati with 150 soldiers fought the great army of Ghumusar and defeated him. But, in subsequent war, he was captured by the enemy and sacrificed his life. Gadadhar Sing's daughter married the great poet Upendra Bhanja of Ghumusar who settled at Malisahi of Nayagarh estate after marriage. When British captured Odisha, Binayak Singh Mandhata was the King of Nayagarh and the great Jadumani Mahapatra was his court poet.

== Transportation ==
Nayagarh Town railway station was put on the railway map of the country on 19 June 2017 when railway minister Suresh Prabhu formally dedicated the new line from Bolgarh Road to Nayagarh Town as part of the ongoing Khurda Road-Balangir project. The railway minister also inaugurated the Nayagarh Town railway station building while flagging off a passenger train that made the first journey to the town.

== Temples, Tourist, Attractions and Nearby places of Interest ==
=== Temples & Religious Places ===
==== Ladukeswar Temple ====
This Shiv temple is situated at Sarankul, a small town towards Odagaon Block. Maha Shivaratri is the important festival which is being celebrated every year. People from all parts of Odisha (mainly south Odisha) come to this place during the festival. The deity popularly known as "Ladu Baba" bestows blessing upon everyone. The temple is situated around 100 km from Bhubaneswar on the Nayagrah- Aska Road in Sharankul and 13 km away from Nayagarh town. The city is regarded as the golden merge of Hari (Vishnu) and Hara (Shiva). "Bolbam" is a traditional culture here for which people across different parts of Odisha visit the temple from their own towns by walking on barefoot and carrying a stick over their shoulder holding 2 pots of water from their town and finally put in the Ladukeshwar temple on the occasion of Shivaratri. The history of Ladukeshwar temple says that a cowherd used to take a couple of cows to the Bhandar mountain situated on top of Ladukeshwar temple now and one day he noticed that the cow automatically milks over a stone periodically everyday and one day when by mistake the cow put the leg on that stone, blood came out of the stone. To the very surprise, the cowherd told that story to village head and on that night one temple priest saw a dream of god speaking of establishing a temple over there. And the king agreed to it and established the temple. From that day onwards Ladukeshwar temple got established in Sharankul. In front of the temple, one monkey used to come for many days and sit at the exit of temple everyday and never ate anything offered by the public and died after few days, hence one small temple was built just outside the exit in the memory of that loving devoted monkey. The temple is now further restructured with more temples internally with further introduction of "Naba gunjar", Maa laxmi temple, haraparbati temple and floating stone of magical Ramsetu times etc. The history is very old and teaches us the culture in every respect.

==== Nilamadhab Temple ====
This temple is situated at Kantilo around 35 km from Nayagarh and 60 km distance from Bhuvneshwar. It is believed that lord Jagannath is the secondary form of lord Nilamadhav, who was worshiped by the tribal head Biswabasu.

==== Odogaon Raghunath Temple ====
This temple is situated at Odagaon around 27 km distance from Nayagarh Town. Prince Ram is worshiped there along with Prince Laxman and Princess Sita. Odagaon Raghunath Temple is a Hindu temple located in Odagaon, Nayagarh District, in the Indian State of Odisha. The temple is dedicated to Lord Raghunath (Ram) and is an important religious and cultural centre in the region.

The temple is traditionally associated with Kabi Samrat Upendra Bhanja, the celebrated Odia poet of the 17th–18th century. According to literary tradition, Upendra Bhanja himself acknowledged that he received knowledge and inspiration through his association with the Raghunath Temple at Odagaon. This association has given the temple a notable place in the cultural history of Odisha.

A distinctive feature of the temple is the iconography of Prince Ram and Prince Laxman, where both deities are depicted with moustaches, which is uncommon in most representations found elsewhere in India. This unique artistic style reflects local traditions and regional sculptural practices.

Odagaon Raghunath Temple remains an active place of worship and attracts devotees, especially during festivals associated with Lord Rama. The temple also holds importance in the context of Odia literary and religious heritage.

==== Dakshinakali Temple ====
This temple is situated in Nayagarh around 1 km distance from Nayagarh Town. Goddess Dakshinakali is the prime deity of Nayagarh. It is said She was taken by a great tantrik of the royal family of Nayagarh king once on his way from Khandpada to Nayagarh. While the royal kin was coming through a mango field at night, the deity appeared before him and since he was a great tantrik, he imprisoned the devi (goddess) and asked her to come with him as an aid until he reached Nayagarh as he was travelling alone. Goddess Dakshinakali came with the tantrik, but upon reaching Nayagarh when he asked Her now can She go, the goddess replied him as you have made me come here now give me shelter and I would not go back and even cursed him to be childless as She was the mother goddess and a son should not have done this even if he has great magical power. Since then the temple for Dakshin Kali was built and the goddess has been worshipped.

==== Saradhapur Raghunath Temple ====
This temple is situated at Saradhapur Village under Itamati Police station, Nayagarh District.

This temple is situated at Saradhapur Village around 6 km distance from Nayagarh town. Prince Ram is worshiped there along with Prince Laxman and Princess Sita. Saradhapur Raghunath Temple is a Hindu temple located in Saradhapur Village, Nayagarh Block, Nayagarh District, in the Indian State of Odisha. The temple is dedicated to Lord Raghunath (Ram) and is an important religious and cultural centre in the region

Saradhapur Raghunath Temple remains an active place of worship and attracts devotees, especially during festivals associated with Prince Ram. The temple also holds importance in the context of Odia literary and religious heritage.

==== Dhenkena Raghunath Temple ====
This temple is situated at Dhenkena village under Malishahi police station.

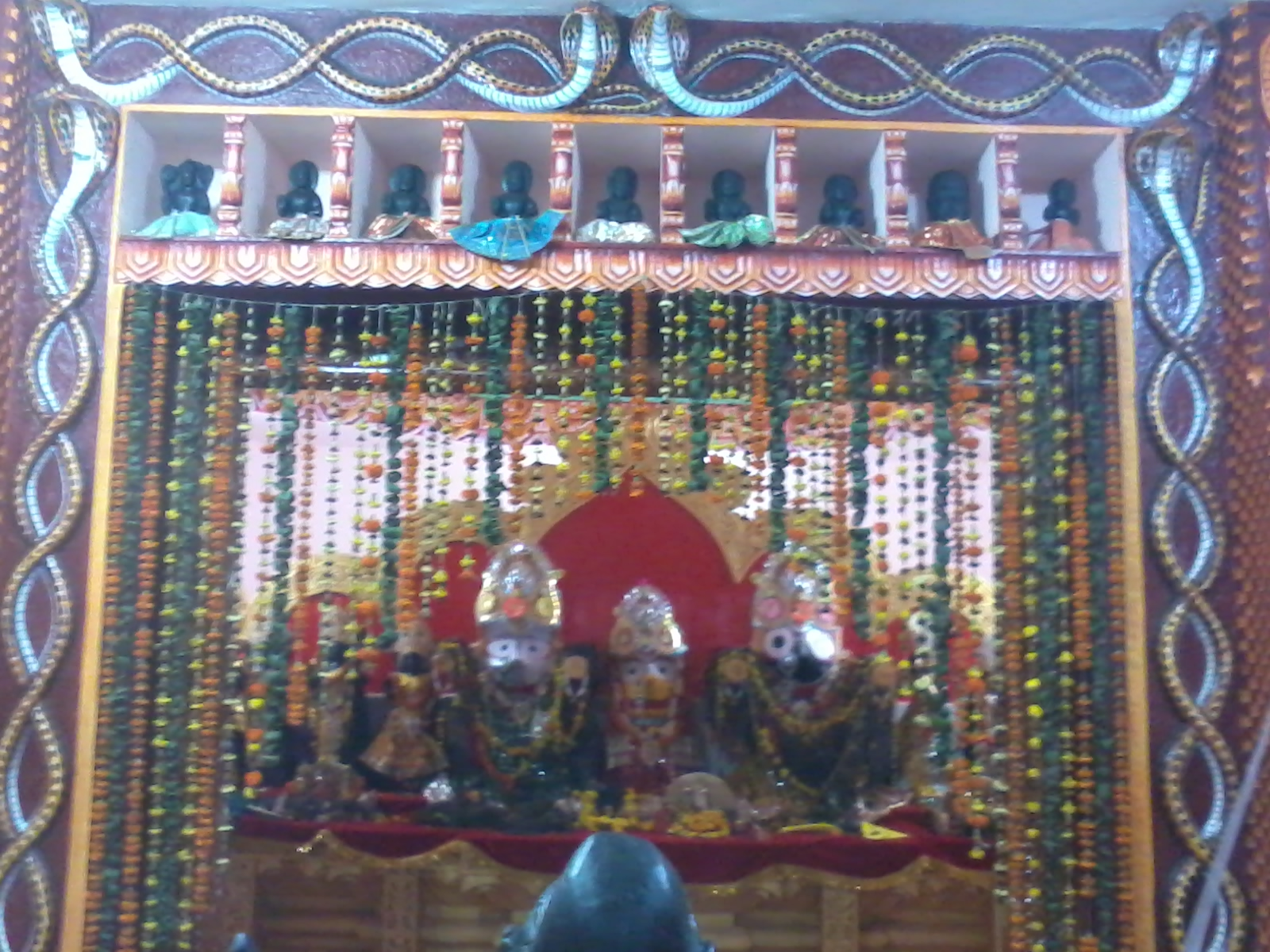
Raghunath temple, Dhenkena

==== Jaleswar Temple, Dihagaon ====
This Shiv temple is situated at Dihagaon, a small village 5 km distance from Daspalla Town towards Gania Block. This is the only shiv temple in the Daspalla area whose "Shiv Ling is a patali shiv ling (came from netherworld, i.e. deep earth, by itself)" and has not been established by human beings. This Shiva Ling was discovered by a tribal couple while they were searching for their habitats.Kartik Poornima is the main festival of Dihagaon Jaleswar Temple followed by Maha Shivaratri, Dola Purnima and Sitala Sasthi.

=== Tourist, Attractions and Nearby places of Interest ===
==== Kotagada Gumpha, Rajsunakhala ====
Lord Mahaveer on the top of the mountain. Kartika Purnima is a festival run near the Gumpha. It is 4 kilometers away from Rajsunakhala & 9 kilometers from Ranpur.

==== Gokulananda Tourism Centre ====
Gokulananda Tourism Centre is a tourist attraction in Nayagarh District, which is situated on the bank of the river Mahanadi in Sidhamula village. There is a cottage and deer park installed near this picnic spot, and accommodation in a cottage.

==== Satkosia Gorge ====
It is the deepest river gorge of Odisha in the river Mahanadi. Its length is about 16 km in between Angul and Daspalla boundary. Gharial crocodile and many reptiles, aquatic birds and animals are found here.

==== Satakosia Wildlife Sanctuary ====
The Satakosia wildlife sanctuary is a tiger reserve. It attracts the nature lovers to experience the Flora and Fauna of Daspalla amidst deep dense forest with trees, herbs and creepers. Tiger, elephant, deer, spotted deer, bison, hare, jackal, wolf, leopard, peacock, parrot, maina, etc., are common.

==== Kuanaria Dam ====
An Irrigation Project has been built on the Kuanaria river just 7 km away from Daspalla Town. It is the largest river dam of Nayagarh district and a good picnic spot with a deer park.

==== Budhabudhiani Dam ====
Budhabudhiani Dam 10 km from Odagaon Town is a picnic place of Nayagarh District.

==== Mahaveer Khol ====
Mahaveer Khol, a small hill at the north of Daspalla is believed to be the original place of God Mahaveer. Swapna Mahaveer is being worshipped here since 1983. It is a fine religious place as well as a very good spot for picnic and for visit. A 3-day-long Jajna is held here every year during Bisub Sankranti where thousands of people gather.

==== Bhimara ====
It is a fine place for rock trekking. Generally, people gather here in the month of Kartik for a visit. It is believed that Bhim the 2nd Pandav was here for some days. So the grand rock bears the footprints of Bhim and named as Bhimara.

==== Gilli Pathar & Gadda Vitara ====
- Gilli Pathar is a place where a temple of lord Giri Gobardhan (name of loard Krishna who once held the mountain Gobardan)is situated on the top of the Gamein Bhandarswar Hill. The hill is full of huge rocks. Its height is approximately 100 m from the sea level. The temple looks like Gilli (a Pin-point).

- Gadda Vitara is a picnic spot and a hill side situated in the village Gamein which is 10 km distance from Nayagarh.It is a historical place. The local people say that the king of Nayagarh had made his Gadda(a place where the King goes for safety living from the enemies at the time of wars) inside the boundaries of four large hills named Barada Pahada, Gamein Bhandarswar Mundia, Binjhagiri Mundia and Kesharpur pahada. The elephants (Nag) protect the Gada on the foot of the hills which is known as Nagamundali (now there is a village named as Nagamundali Village). There was a large plain area inside the four hills boundaries. Right now plantation has been made there by the villagers. It is a good picnic spot to view the hill side, stream and green areas.

To reach at this place, drive on the Nayagarh-Godipada road up to Kalikaprasada, then right turn for 3 km to Gamein Village. Another road is also the same 10 km distance, a 5-km drive on the Nayagarh-Odagaon Road and left turn from Jamujhala for next 5 km to Gamein Village.

== Forest and Wild life ==
=== Daspalla, Vimara Range ===
Vimara Range is 35 km from Nayagarh Town towards Daspalla. It is divided into three by large stones and was made not just by the rulers but also by the villagers.

== Cuisines ==
Nayagarh is known for the popular sweet dish Chhena poda, which means 'burnt cheese' in Odiya. Best quality chhena poda can be found in Itamati and Machhipada (villages located in Nayagarh). Pithas are enjoyed on traditional holidays, while more savory pithas are common at other times of the year. Local people of Nayagarh and in other regions like Daspalla, Madhyakhanda and Gholahandi prepare Manda pitha, Chakuli pitha, Poda pitha, Arisha pitha and Kakra pitha during different Hindu festivals.

== Business, Agriculture, and Culture ==
Itamati only 6 km away from Nayagarh Town is a Business Centre of Nayagarh. All types of trading of Nayagarh start in Itamati.

Rajsunakhala - A Growing Business & Urban Centre of the District.

Rajsunakhala has emerged as one of the second-largest business centres in the district and is also becoming an important urban living hub. Located just 26 kilometres from the district headquarters, Rajsunakhala has developed into a vibrant and convenient place for everyday life.

Almost everything needed for daily life is readily available here—from general markets and essential goods to ornaments, jewellery, dry fish, clothing, household items and many other products.

Over the years, Rajsunakhala’s business market has grown significantly. The town is witnessing the arrival of new shopping malls, modern shops, showrooms and other commercial establishments, adding a new dimension to its urban character.With its growing population, expanding marketplace, improved commercial activities and easy access to daily necessities, Rajsunakhala is steadily developing into a prominent business and urban centre of the district.

Since Nayagarh is present in between Angul, Cuttack, Aska, Berhampur, Rajsunakhala and Khurda, Nayagarh also had a great business field. After completion of Sidhamala Dam Project in Kantilo over Mahanadi River, the distance from Nayagarh to Angul and Cuttack has been shortened, which ultimately increased business in Nayagarh. The National Highway - 57 also goes through Nayagarh, which shortened the distance from Bhubaneswar to Bolangir. This also influenced trade in Nayagarh. Daspalla is also 4th biggest business hub in Nayagarh District due to its location nowadays. Tribal people living in Kandhmal District come here to earn their livelihood. The Town is connected with well maintained National Highways and State Highways and Railways with nearest airport Biju Patnaik International Airport in hubaneswar uda Airport renamed as Veer Surendra Sai Airport in Jharsuguda.

The agricultural lands of the district of Nayagarh are basically fit for cultivation of seasonal paddy, pulses like mung and black gram and sugarcane. There are hills and forests spread in the nearby areas of the town of Nayagarh as well as in the different parts of the district where herbal and forest products are available including natural medicinal plants. People cultivate groundnut, sesame, and other similar grams during the suitable times which are highly nutritious. The forest products also include saal and kendu leaves supporting life of the rural and tribal people.

The culture of Nayagarh is rural and based on the established traditions right from the ancient times. These are mostly related to the religious systems prevailing in the Hindu temples of Lord Shiv, Prince Ram, Lord Krishn, Lord Jagannath and the established deities of Hinduism. Every year, people observe Mahavishuva Sankranti (or Pana Sankranti) also known as Haunuman Jayanti after performing the rituals of Danda, a traditional festival of lord Shiv and Goddess Kali when people keep fast and walk on the fire made of wood charcoals on the last day of the festival, with a great fervor. In addition, there are age-old traditions of Dola Yatra, Rama Navami and Ratha Yatra too. Nayagarh has unique contributions of Danda Yatra, Raam Leela, Duari Nata, Pala, Daskathia, and Samkirtan to the State. Even these days, the people take strain unitedly to stage drama on different occasions. In a village named Manikagoda and even elsewhere in the locality, all cultural celebrations are equally enjoyed by both Hindus and Muslims.

== Great Personalities of Nayagarh ==
Nayagarh has a prominent place in the history of Odia literature, especially in Odiya poetry. One of the most popular sweet dish in Odisha: Chhenapoda was made in Nayagarh by Bidyadhar Sahoo. Many of the great Odia poets are from Nayagarh. Kabi samrat Upendra Bhanja known for Baidehisha Bilas and others who throughout his poetic career lived in Nayagarh and had the boon of Lord Sriram from the temple of Deuli village in Nayagarh, Utkal Ghanta Jadumani Mahapatra, known for Raghab Bilas and Prabandha Purnachandra, Kabisurya Sadananda Brahma who is the guru (teacher) of gaudiya kabi Abhimanyu Samant Singhar, Banigourab Kabi Biswanath Champati who was a great poet, tantrik and astrologer. Above all, the great Samant Chandra Sekhar (popularly known as Pathani Samanta) of Khandapara was a great poet whose Sidhant Darpan stands as a witness, a great work of Sanskrit literature written in Odia script on astrological treaties, which stands as a masterpiece of astrological research in world literature. Jagu Rautray was the army general of the king of Nayagarh who defeated Kujanga Sandha a great fighter of Kujang in Odisha. Sankirtan gayaks Anand Nayak (titled niankhunta—burning rod, village-Notar), Harihar Nayak (vil.-Phasipada), Udayanath Prusty (vil. Godipada), etc., are a few to mention. Arjun Barik (vil.- Badadesh Haripur) is also a well-known poet of Nayagarh.

== Politics ==
The current MLA is Arun Kumar Sahoo of Biju Janta Dal (BJD), who won the seat for the fifth term in State elections in 2024. Previous MLAs from this seat were Arun Kumar Sahoo (2004–2009), Bhagabat Behera who won this seat representing BJD in 2000, representing JD in 1990, representing JNP in 1985 and 1977, Sitakanta Mishra of INC in 1995, and Bansidhar Sahoo of INC(I) in 1980.

== Print media of Nayagarh ==
The print media of Nayagarh District are Nayagarh Darpan, Sambad Parampara, Graharaj, Baghua Barta. Among all Nayagarh Darpan is largely circulated fortnightly News Paper in Nayagarh District.

== Lok Sabha constituency ==
Nayagarh was a part of Bhubaneswar (Lok Sabha constituency). And after delimitation it is now part of (Puri Lok Sabha constituency) from 2009.
