= Nayagarh district =

- District of Odisha
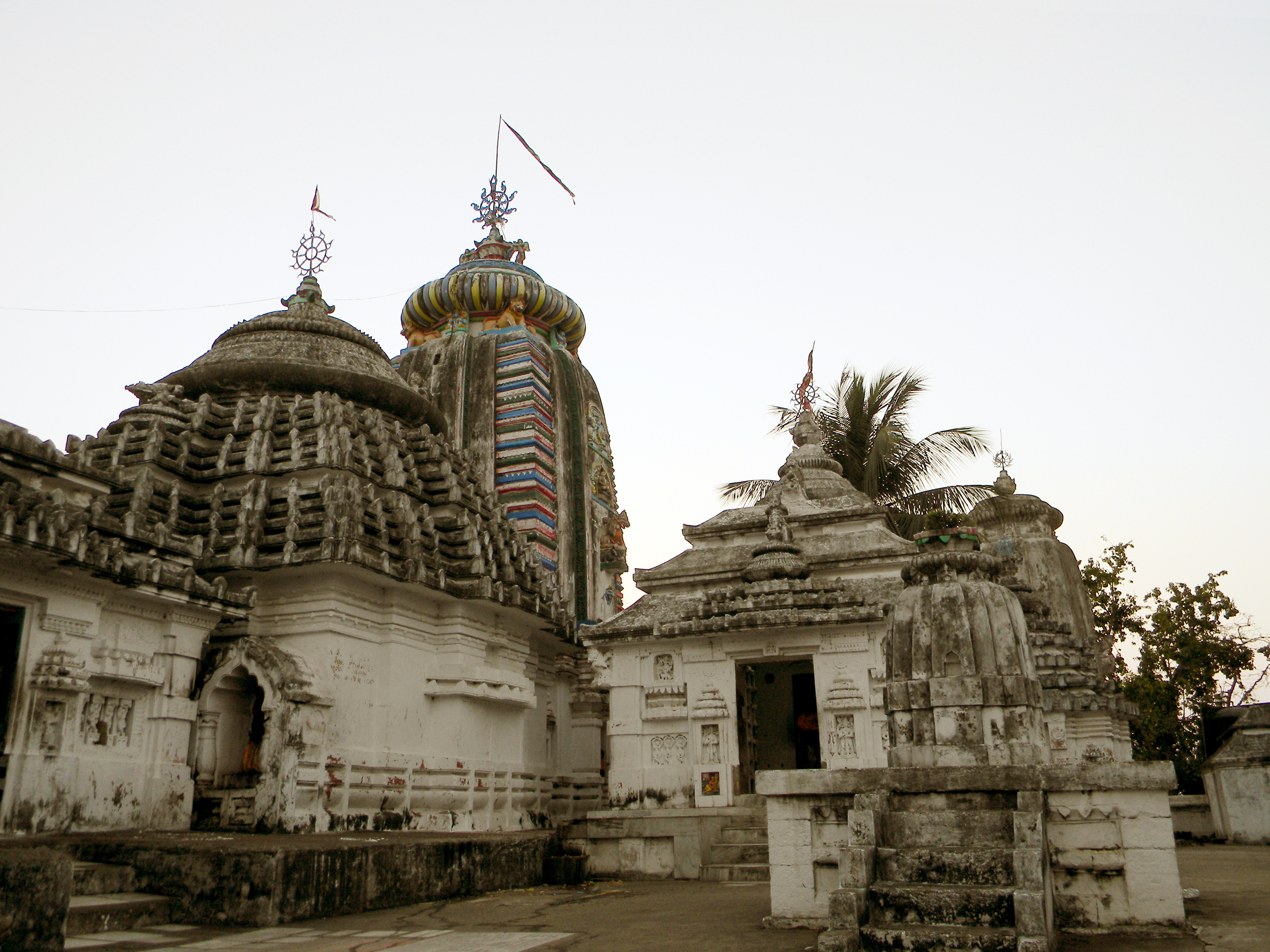
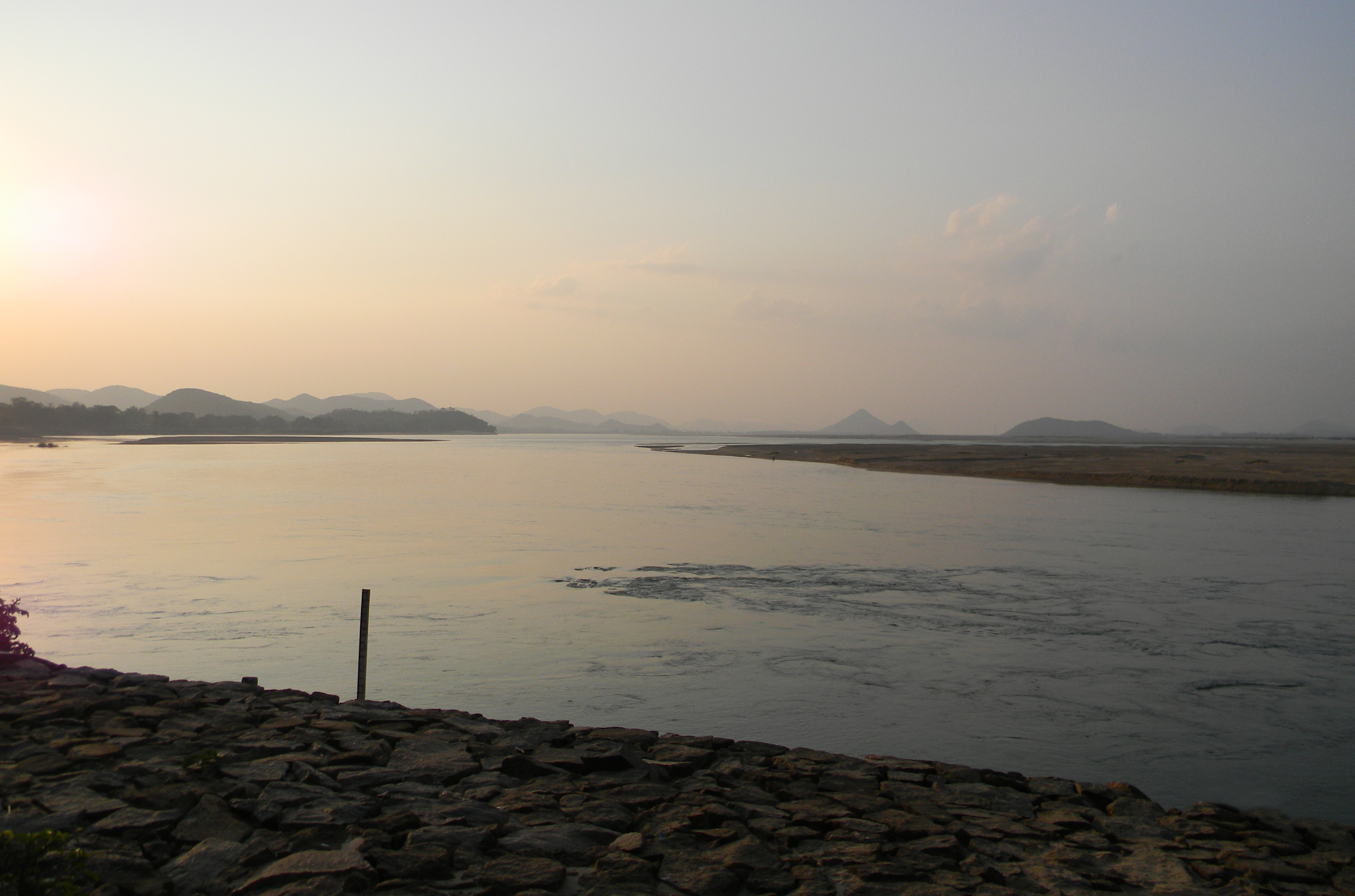
- Top: Nilamadhav Temple; Bottom: Mahanadi near Nayagarh

- Location in Odisha
- Coordinates: 20.116°N 85.01°E
- Country: India
- State: Odisha
- Headquarters: Nayagarh

Government
  - Collector & District Magistrate: Madhumita Rath, IAS
  - Superintendent of Police: Suvendhu Kumar Patra, IPS
  - Member of Lok Sabha: Sambit Patra (BJP)
  - Member of Legislative Assembly: Dr. Arun Kumar Sahoo (BJD)

Area
  - Total: 3,890 km^{2} (1,500 sq mi)

Population (2011)
  - Total: 962,789
  - Density: 248/km^{2} (641/sq mi)

Languages
  - Official: Odia and Indian English
- Time zone: UTC+5:30 (IST)
- PIN: 752 069
- Vehicle registration: OD-25
- Sex ratio: 0.994 ♂/♀
- Lok Sabha constituency: Puri
- Climate: Aw (Köppen)
- Precipitation: 1,449.1 millimetres (57.05 in)
- Website: nayagada.odisha.gov.in/en

Nayagarh district is one of the 30 districts of Odisha state in eastern India. It was created on 1 April 1993 when the erstwhile Puri district was split into three distinct districts, namely Khordha, Nayagarh and Puri. The district headquarters is Nayagarh.

The district is bordered by Khordha to the south and east, Cuttack to the east and north, Angul to the north, Boudh to the north-west, Kandhamal to the west and Ganjam to the south-west.

== Blocks ==
1. Bhapur
2. Daspalla
3. Gania
4. Khandapada
5. Nayagarh
6. Nuagaon
7. Odagaon
8. Ranpur

== Demographics ==
Historical population
Year	Pop.	±%
1901	331,061	—
1911	337,561	+2.0%
1921	303,665	−10.0%
1931	336,493	+10.8%
1941	363,652	+8.1%
1951	392,506	+7.9%
1961	470,878	+20.0%
1971	578,498	+22.9%
1981	683,392	+18.1%
1991	782,647	+14.5%
2001	864,516	+10.5%
2011	962,789	+11.4%
Source: Census of India

=== Religions ===
According to the 2011 census, Nayagarh district has a population of 962,789, roughly equal to the nation of Fiji or the US state of Montana. This gives it a ranking of 453rd in India (out of a total of 640). The district has a population density of 247 inhabitants per square kilometre (640/sq mi). Its population growth rate over the decade 2001–2011 was 11.3%. Nayagarh has a sex ratio of 916 females for every 1000 males, and a literacy rate of 79.17%. 8.28% of the population lives in urban areas. Scheduled Castes and Scheduled Tribes make up 14.17% and 6.10% of the population respectively.

Religions in Nayagarh district (2011)
Religion	Percent
Hinduism	99.27%
Islam	0.55%
Other or not stated	0.18%

=== Languages ===
Languages of Nayagarh district in (2011)
1. Odia (99.1%)
2. Kui (0.60%)
3. Others (0.31%)

Odia is the predominant language, spoken by 99.09% of the population. Kui is spoken by a small minority (0.60%).

== Geographical Indication ==
Nayagarh Kanteimundi brinjal was awarded the Geographical Indication (GI) status tag from the Geographical Indications Registry, under the Union Government of India, on 2 January 2024 and is valid until 7 February 2031.

Neelamadhav Krushi Sanghathan from Banapur, proposed the GI registration of Nayagarh Kanteimundi brinjal. After filing the application in February 2021, the brinjal was granted the GI tag in 2024 by the Geographical Indication Registry in Chennai, making the name "Nayagarh Kanteimundi brinjal" exclusive to the Brinjal grown in the region. It thus became the first brinjal variety from Odisha and the 23rd type of goods from Odisha to earn the GI tag.

The GI tag protects the brinjal from illegal selling and marketing, and gives it legal protection and a unique identity.

== See also ==
- Nayagarh State – Princely state that existed in the Nayagarh district, Odisha, India.
