= Balugaon =

Balugaon Balugan
- Town
- Location in Odisha, India Balugaon (India)
- Coordinates: 19.75°N 85.21°E
- Country: India
- State: Odisha
- District: Khordha
- Incorporated(NAC): 10 September 1982; 43 years ago

Government
  - Type: Nagar Panchayat
  - Chairperson: Sukanti Paikaray (BJD)

Area
  - Total: 6.12 km^{2} (2.36 sq mi)
- Elevation: 0.91 m (3 ft)

Population (2011)
  - Total: 17,645
  - Estimate (2024): 25,000
  - Density: 2,880/km^{2} (7,470/sq mi)

Languages
  - Official: Odia
- Time zone: UTC+5:30 (IST)
- PIN: 752030
- Telephone code: 06756
- Vehicle registration: OD-02
- Website: balugaonnac.in

Balugaon (ବାଲୁଗାଁ, English: /ˈbɑːluːɡɑːŋ/) is a town and a Notified Area Council in Khordha district in the state of Odisha, India. It is situated near the bank of Chilika Lake, about 90 kilometres (56 mi) from the state capital Bhubaneswar, and 76 kilometres (47 mi) from the Berhampur, Ganjam. It is a major economic centre of Khordha district because of its prawn and fish business.

== Geography ==
Balugaon is located at 19.74°N 85.21°E. It has an average elevation of 3 feet (0.91 m) and an area of 6.12 km$^2$. It is located on the Banpur-Balugaon anorthosite massif, an igneous rock part of Chilka Lake igneous complex. The mamu-bhanaja hillocks here are anorthosite outcrops.

The town primarily has acidic black soil. The soil texture varies from clay loam to sandy loam as one approaches the lake bank.

== Communication ==
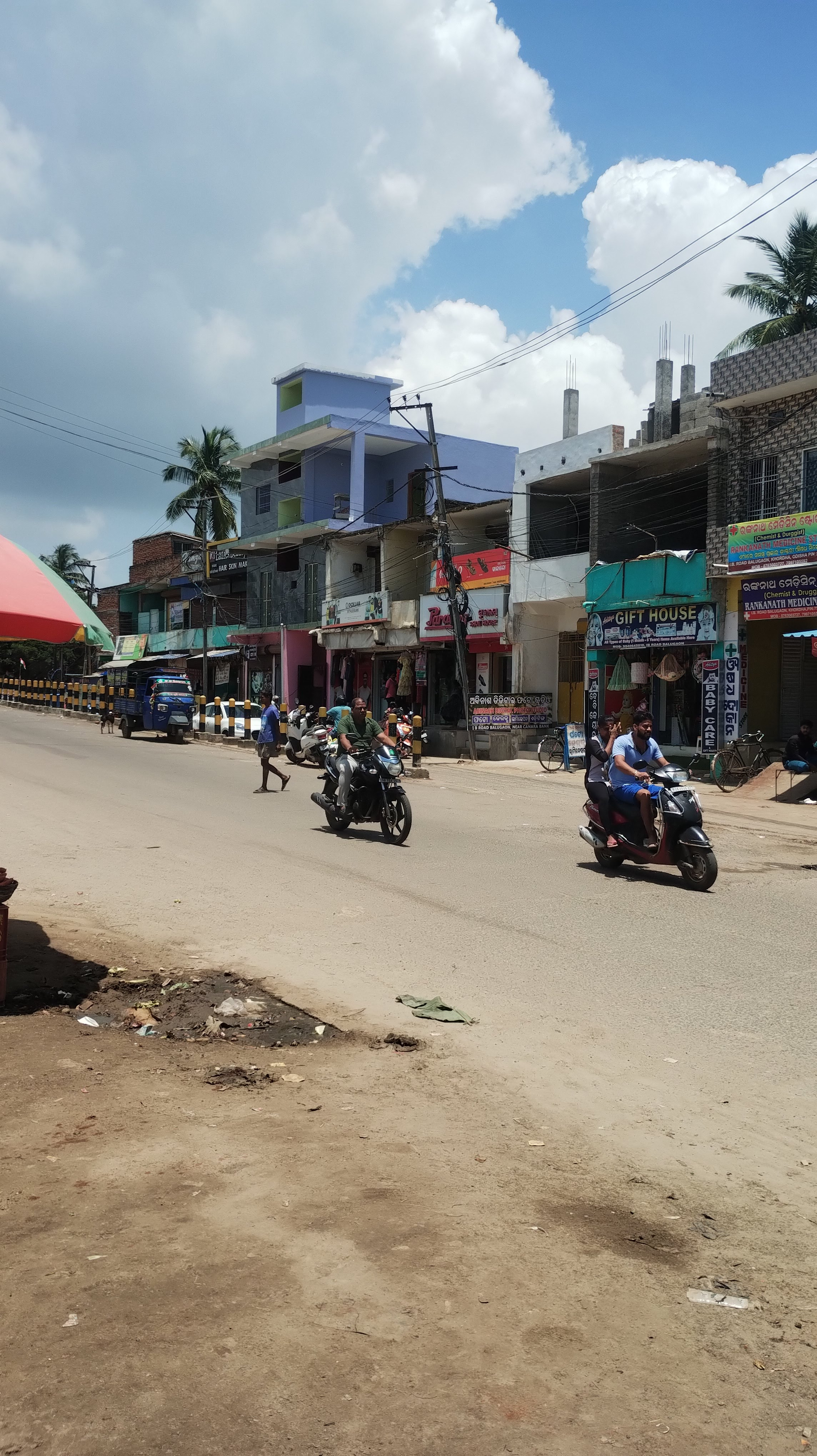
Balugaon end of the Balugaon-Banapur overbridge

Balugaon is well connected to state capital Bhubaneswar and Berhampur by road (NH-16) and rail. The Banpur-Balugaon overbridge acts as the sole connector between the two cities. Balugaon railway station on the Howrah-Chennai main line connects Balugaon to major Indian cities like Kolkata, Chennai and Visakhapatnam. All major trains passing through this line stop at Balugaon. Jagannath Dham Puri can be reached via New Jagannath Sadak.

== Government and politics ==
Balugaon N.A.C. was established on 10 September 1982 for the provision and maintenance of basic public facilities and services which includes Sanitation, Water Supply, street lights, road, and drainage. It is part of the Chilika Assembly Constituency.

In the 2022 ULB elections, BJD's Sukanti Paikaray won the woman-reserved chairpersonship of Balugaon through direct election, defeating BJP's Swapna Badajena and INC's Ramamani Behera. The BJD also won 6 out of Balugaon's 11 wards while BJP won the rest. Out of a total of 12913 (46.9% women) eligible voters, 9503 (46.8% women) voted in the ULB elections.

The Inspector-In-Charge of Balugaon Police Station is Sri Jaya Prakash Parida. The police station comes under the jurisdiction of Banpur Court Complex.

== Education ==
Balugaon had an average literacy rate of 81.7%, higher than the state average of 72.8%, with 88% of the males and 75% of females literate.

=== K-12 Schooling ===
In academic year 2024–25, 4,321 (44% Girls) students were enrolled in the K-12 school system of Balugaon. A considerable number of these students were from outside Balugaon. Enrollment of girls in government primary schools remain higher than that of boys. However, ratio of girls decreases significantly in government high schools despite them performing better than boys in academics. Ratio of girls remain low in private schools across all levels of schooling.

As of 2024, 23 recognized government and private schools located in Balugaon serve the town and its neighbouring area. These schools collectively employ 172 teachers (106 females) resulting in an average student-teacher ratio of 25.12—higher than the district average of 23.45. The top 5 schools in terms of number of enrolled students are as follows:

1. Govt. High School, Balugaon (Ward No. 10)
2. Balugaon Higher Secondary School (Ward No. 01)
3. Chilkarani English Medium School
4. Balugaon PUPS (Primary with Upper Primary School)
5. Venkateswar School

=== Post Secondary Education ===
Balugaon College is the only post-secondary institution in Balugaon. It offers a 3-year bachelor program in humanities, and also provides higher secondary education (11th and 12th) in Humanities, and Science.

== Tourism ==
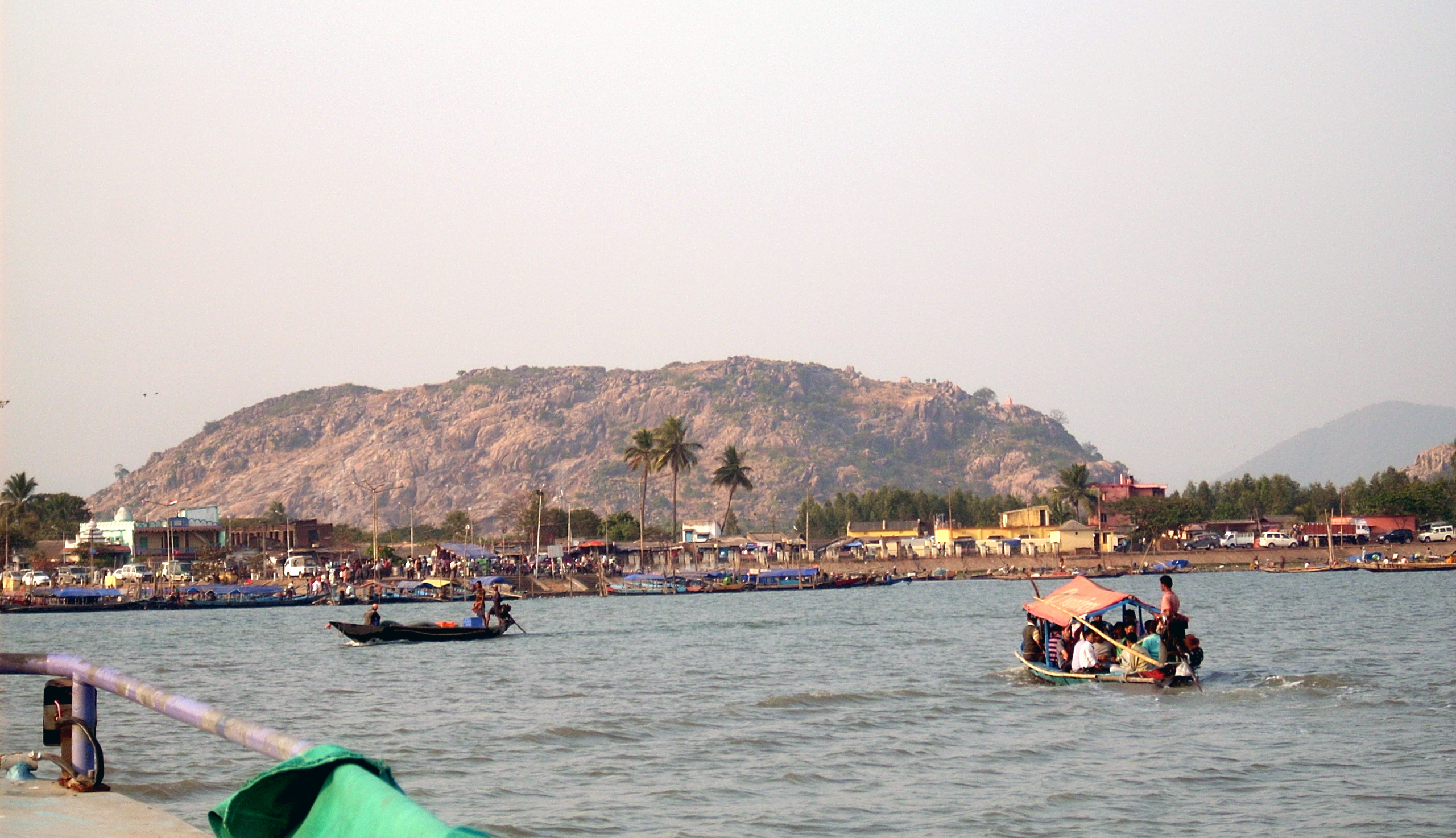
Lakeshore of Balugaon as seen from Chilika lake.

Tourist spots at Chilika lake, like Kalijai Temple and Nalabana, can be reached from Balugaon with government or private boat and launch services. Narayani Temple is a few miles from Balugaon and is known for its natural setting. There is a natural fountain near Ranpur.

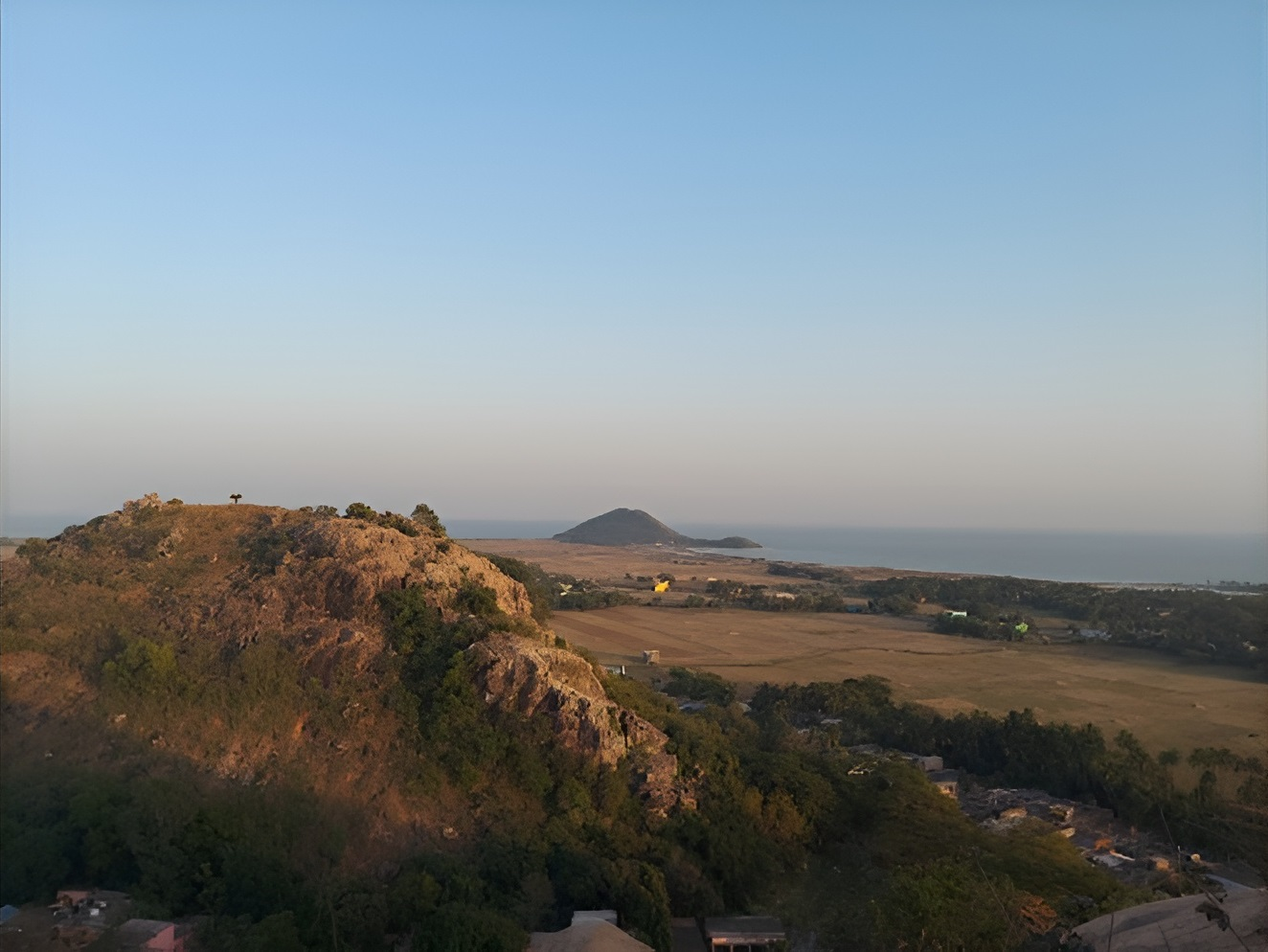
View of Bhanja hillock captured from top of the Mamu hill

The Odi Art Centre, A tribal Art Museum, is located near Balugaon in Barkul. It hosts the weeklong Chilika Shelduck International Folk Carnival in November every year. The Mamu Bhanaja Hill recreational park situated at the foothills of Mamu Bhanaja. It was opened to public on 18 February 2024, fulfilling a long-standing community demand for a local park.

== Demographics ==
In the 2011 India census, Balugaon had a population of 17,645 (males 52%, females 48%) and a total of 3212 households. Balugaon had an average literacy rate of 81.7%, higher than the state average of 72.8%, with 88% of the males and 75% of females literate. 11% of the population were under 6 years of age. Schedule Caste (SC) constituted 25.75% while Schedule Tribe (ST) were 0.39% of the total population. Its population is projected to be 25000 as of 2024.
