= Bhagirathi Maharana =

Indian politician

- ଭାଗିରଥି ମହାରଣା
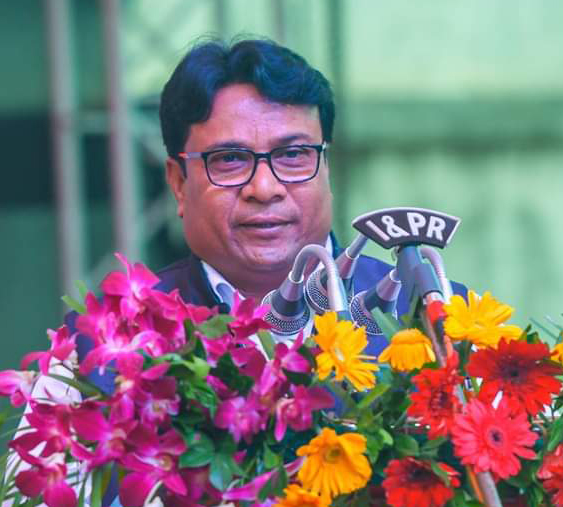

Vice president of Biju Sramika Samukhya (Ganjam Dist)

Personal details
- Born: 20 March 1967 (age 59) Berhampur, Odisha, India
- Party: Biju Janata Dal
- Spouse: Subhasini Maharana
- Children: 2

Bhagirathi Maharana (Odia: ଭାଗିରଥି ମହାରଣା) (born 20 March 1967) is a BJD Floor leader and currently the Vice president of Biju Sramika Samukhya (Ganjam Dist). He Is a well known Social worker in both Berhampur and Gopalpur. Bhagirathi Maharana recently nominated as a president of Ganjam Karigar Sangh. He is actively participate in many party (Biju Janata Dal) activity of Gopalpur constituency.

== Positions ==
- Vice President Biju Sramika Samukhya, (Ganjam Dist): MARCH, 2018 in present
