= Streptomyces chitinivorans =

Scientific classification
- Domain: Bacteria
- Kingdom: Bacillati
- Phylum: Actinomycetota
- Class: Actinomycetia
- Order: Streptomycetales
- Family: Streptomycetaceae
- Genus: Streptomyces
- Species: S. chitinivorans

Binomial name
- Streptomyces chitinivorans Ray et al. 2016

Type strain
- JCM 30611, KCTC 29696, RC1832

Species of bacterium

Streptomyces chitinivorans is a chitinolytic bacterium species from the genus of Streptomyces which has been isolated from lake sediments from a fish dumping yard in Balugaon in India.

== See also ==
- List of Streptomyces species
