= Ganjam railway station =

Railway station on the East Coast Railway network in India

Ganjam
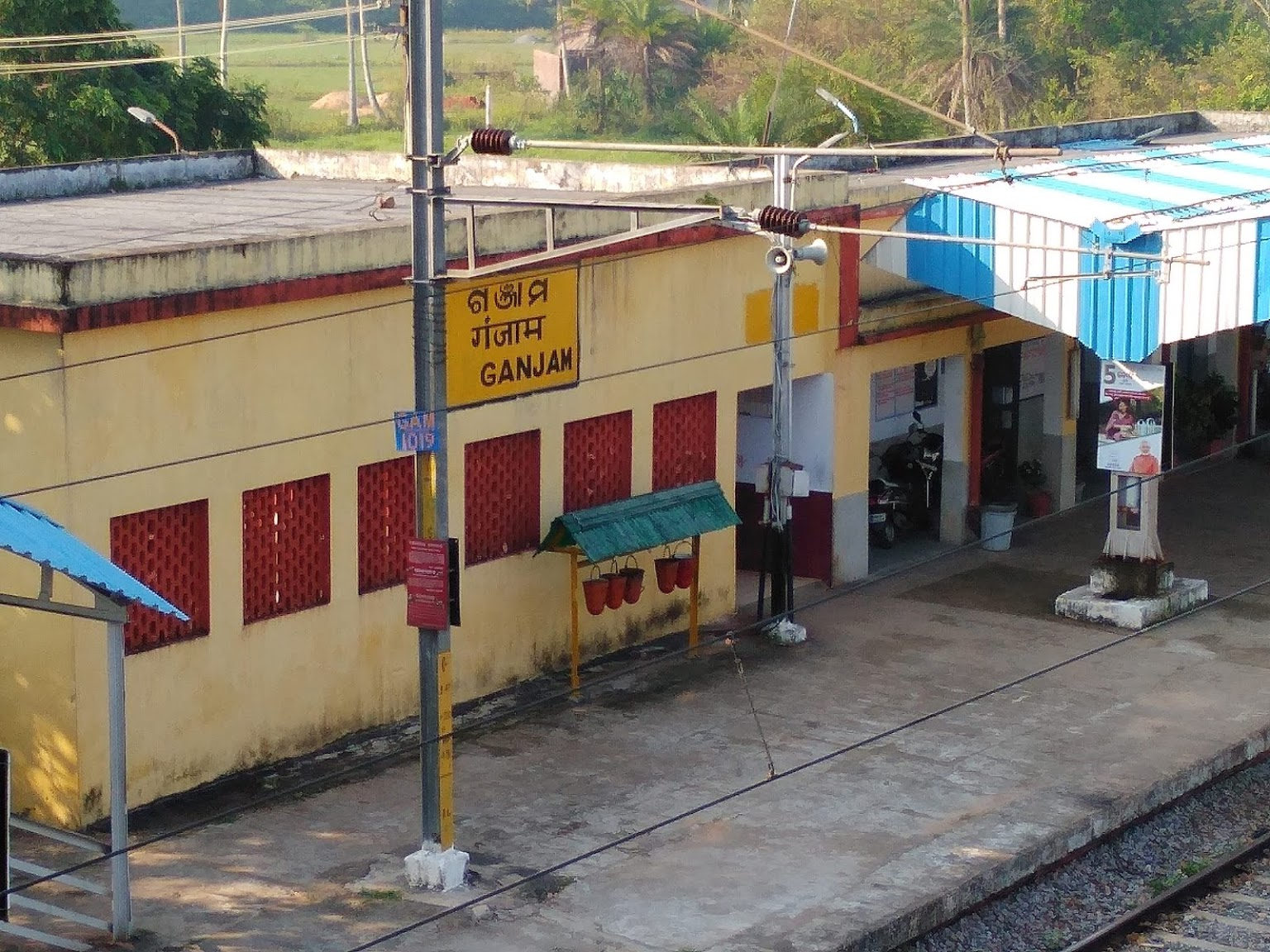

General information
- Location: Ganjam, Odisha; India
- Coordinates: 19°23′43″N 85°02′45″E
- System: Indian Railways station
- Owner: Ministry of Railways, Indian Railways
- Line: Howrah–Chennai main line
- Platforms: 4
- Tracks: 4

Construction
- Structure type: Standard (on ground)
- Parking: No

Other information
- Status: Functioning
- Station code: GAM
- Zone(s): East Coast Railway
- Division(s): Khurda Road
Location
- Location within India Location within Odisha

Ganjam railway station is a railway station on the East Coast Railway network in the state of Odisha, India. It serves Ganjam town. Its code is GAM. It has four platforms. Passenger, MEMU, Express trains halt at Ganjam railway station.

== Major trains ==
- Hirakhand Express
- Bhubaneshwar–Visakhapatnam Intercity Express

== See also ==
- Ganjam district

== Gallery ==
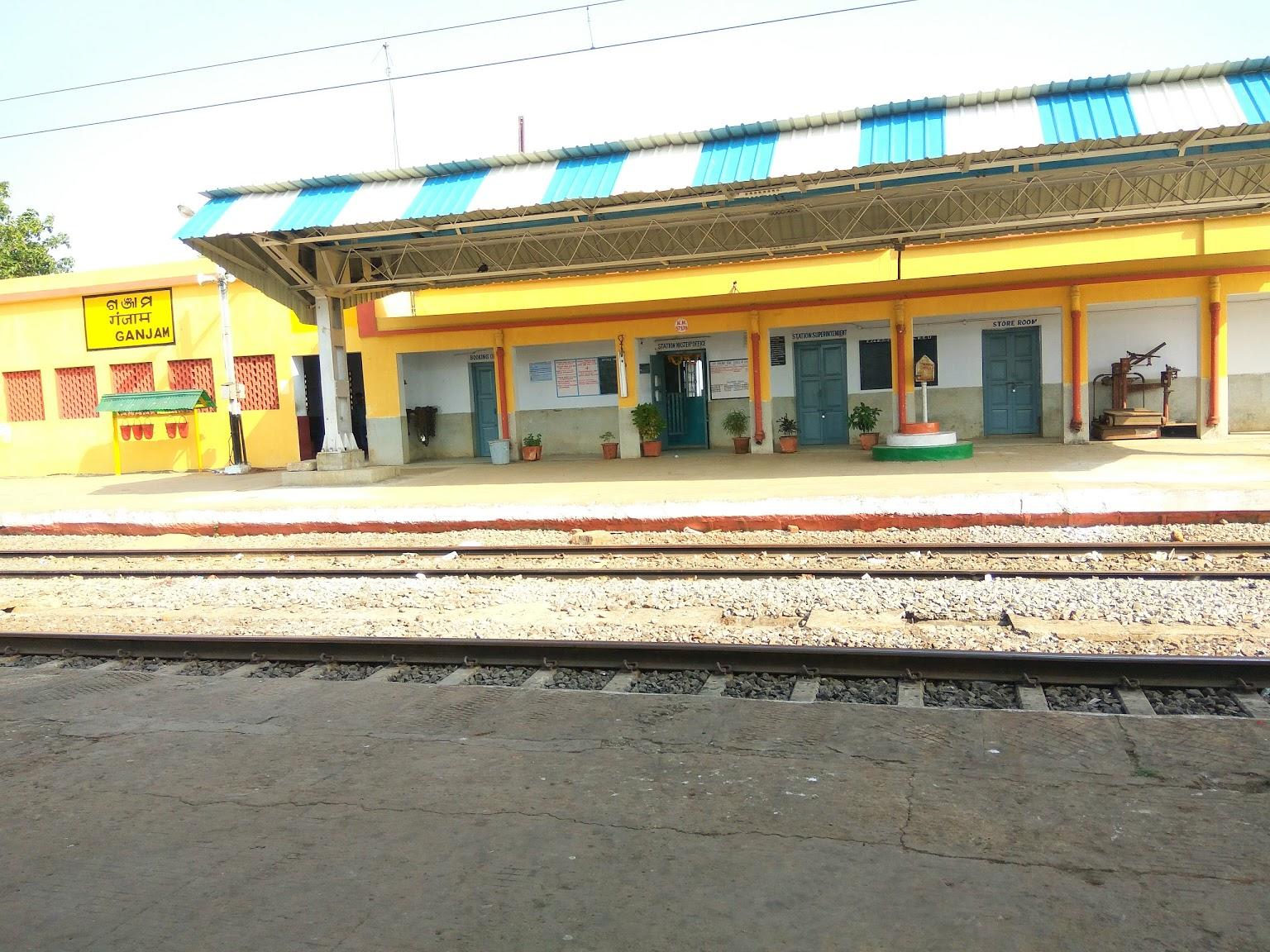
Ganjam railway station

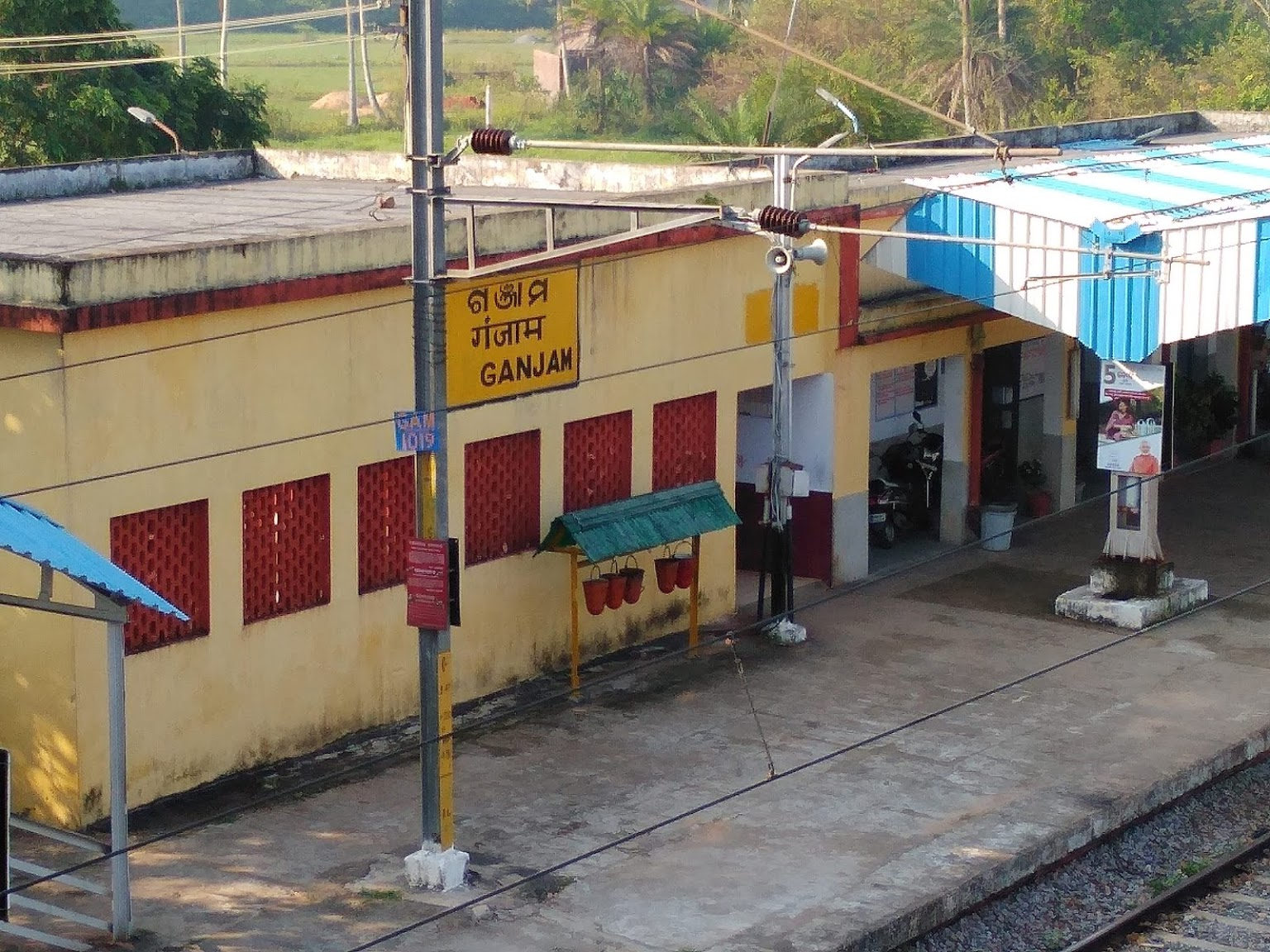
Ganjam railway station

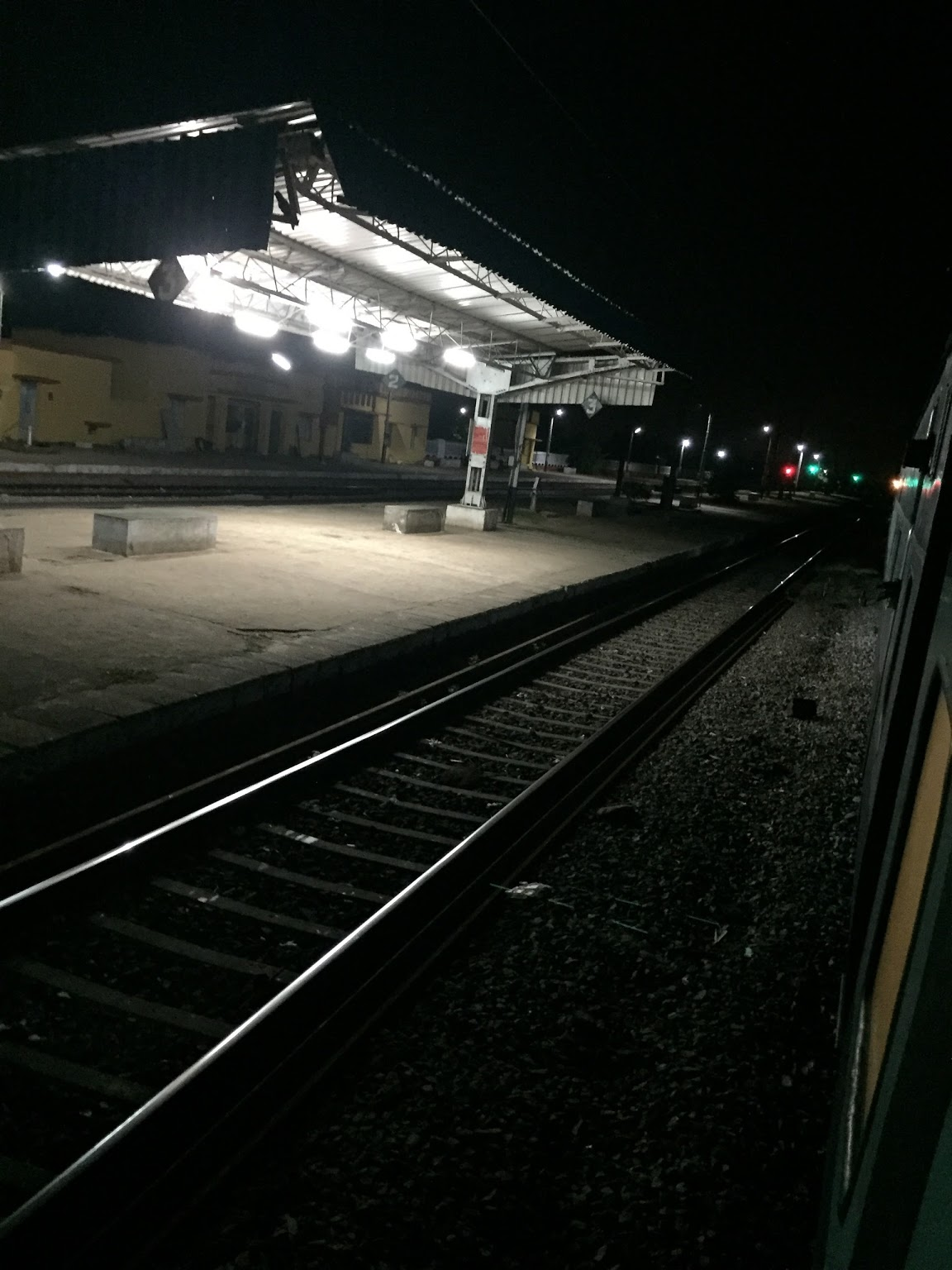
Ganjam railway station

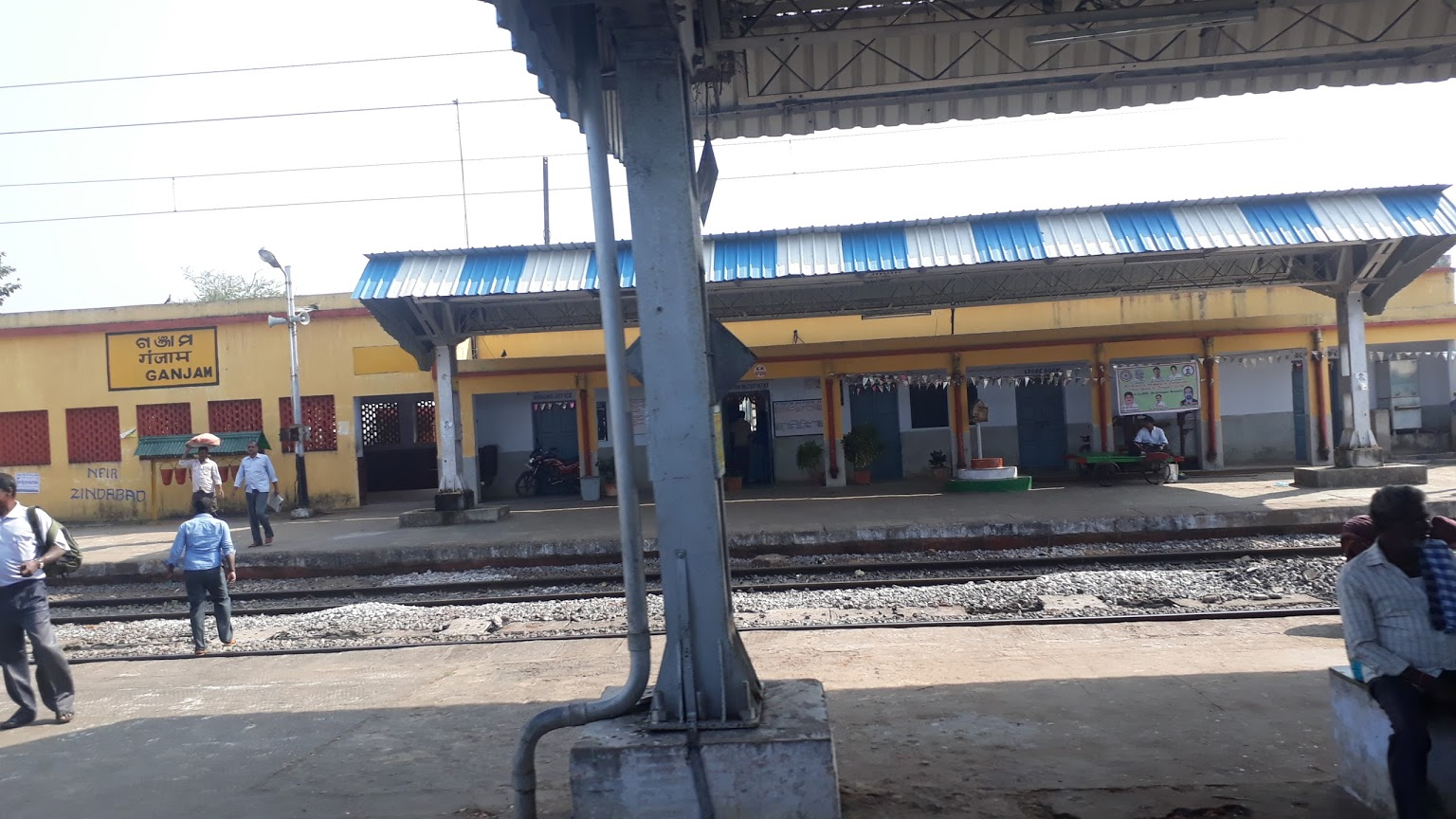
Ganjam railway station

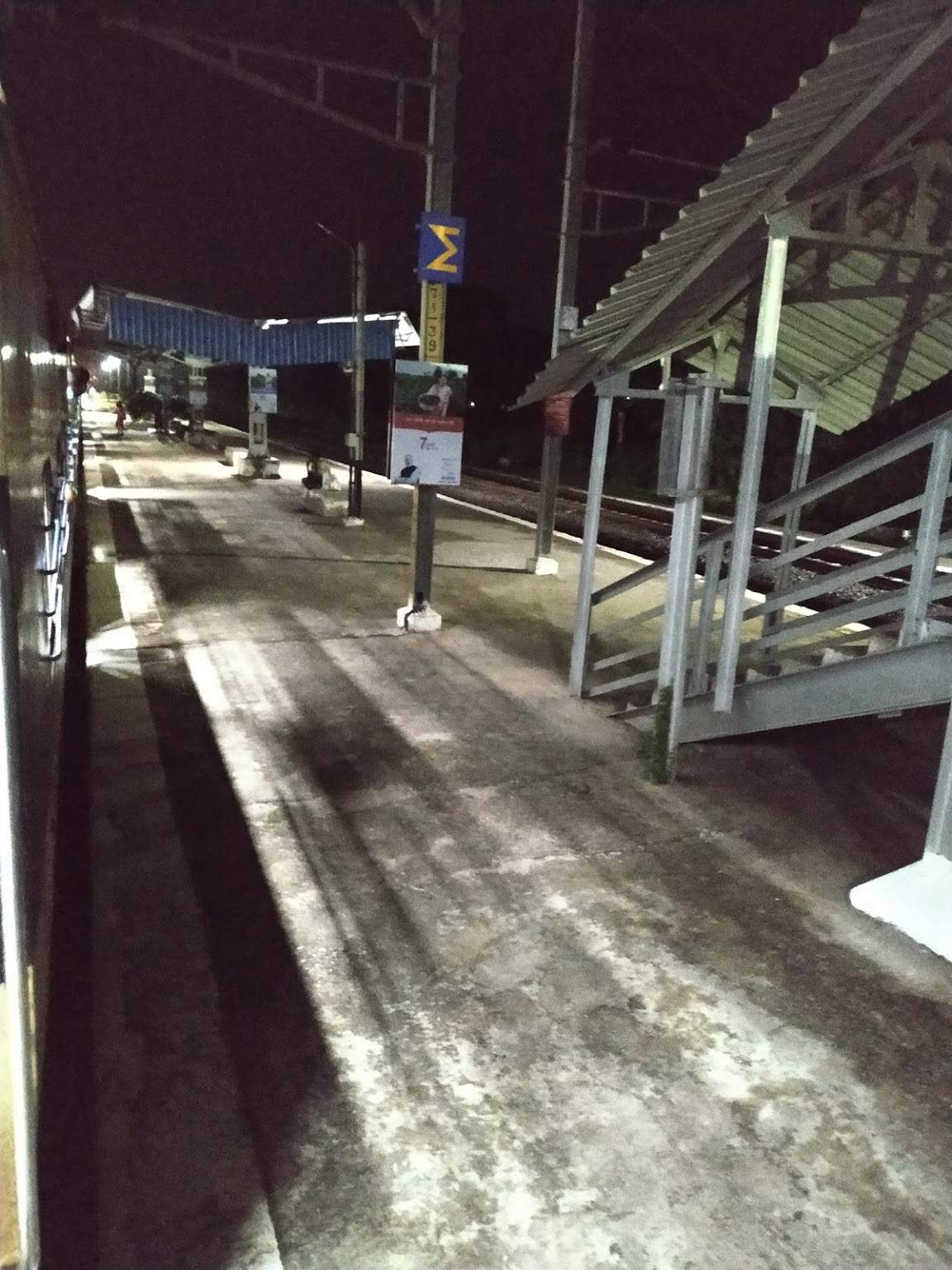
Ganjam railway station
