= Nalbana Bird Sanctuary =

- IUCN category IV (habitat/species management area)
- Location within Odisha Location within India
- Interactive map of Nalbana Bird Sanctuary
- Location: Puri, Odisha, India
- Coordinates: 19°41′39″N 85°18′24″E
- Area: 15.53 square kilometres (6.00 sq mi)
- Website: www.wildlifeorissa.in/chilika.html

Nalbana Bird Sanctuary or Nalbana Island is the core area of the Ramsar designated wetlands of Chilika Lake. It was declared a bird sanctuary under the Wildlife Protection Act in 1972. In the heart of the park, one can see thousands of birds descending during the migratory season. The island disappears during monsoon season due to inundation only to emerge again in post-monsoon.

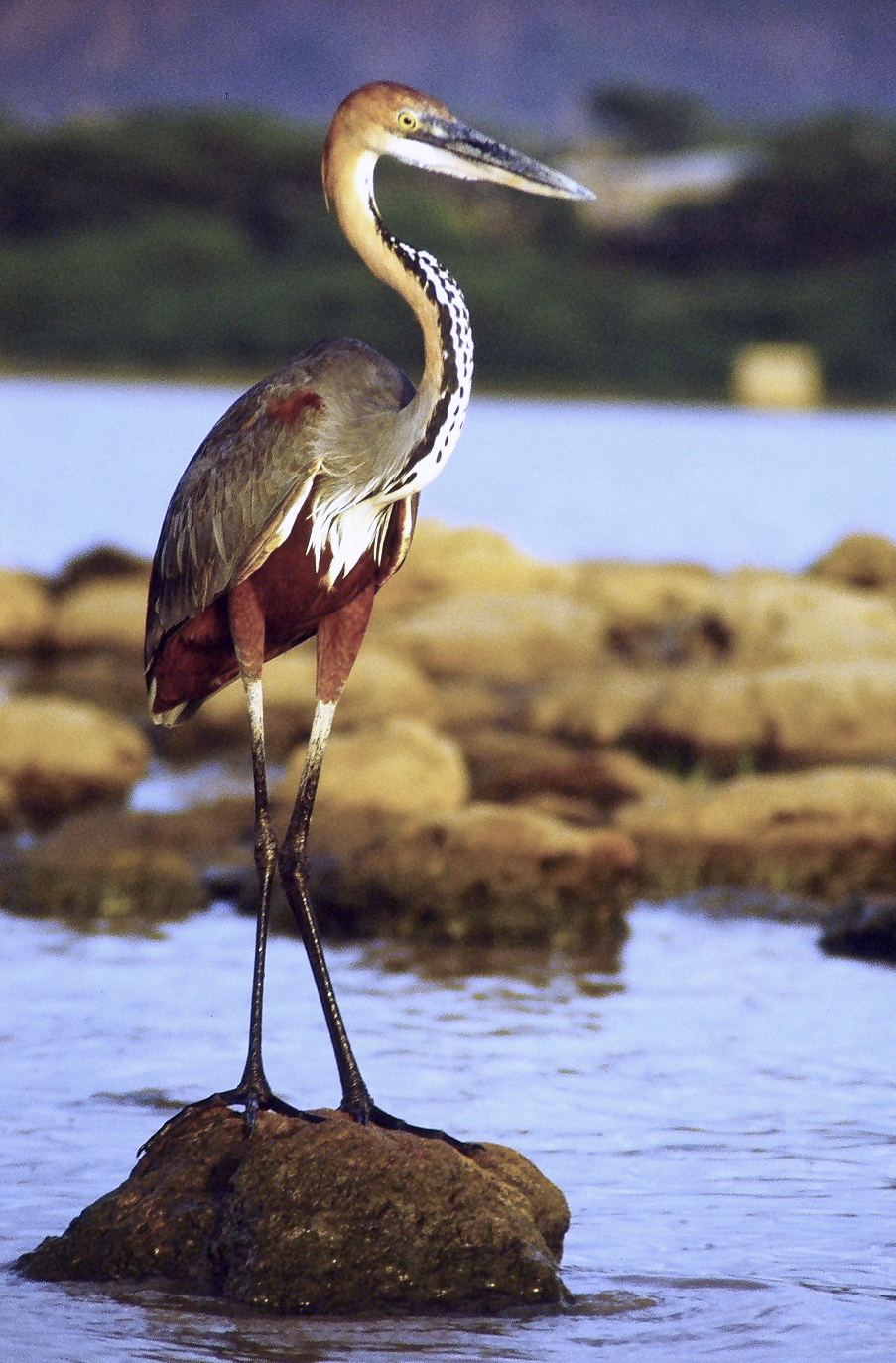
Goliath heron

Nalbana means a weed covered island In the Odia language. It is a major island in the center of the lake with an area of 15.53 km^{2} (6.00 sq mi). The island gets completely submerged during the monsoon season. As the monsoon recedes in the winter, lake levels decrease and the island is gradually exposed, birds flock to the island in large numbers to feed on its extensive mudflats. Nalbana was notified in 1987 and declared a bird sanctuary in 1973 under the Wildlife Protection Act.

Large flocks of greater flamingos from Iran and the Rann of Kutch in Gujarat, feed in the shallow waters of the lake. Other-long legged waders seen around Nalbana Island are the lesser flamingos, Goliath heron, grey herons, purple herons, egrets, spoonbills, storks and black-headed ibis. Many species of birds live in the sanctuary, including rare birds. Rare birds reported in the lake are Asiatic dowitchers (NT), Dalmatian pelican (VU), Pallas's fish-eagles (VU), the very rare migrant spoon-billed sandpiper (CR) and spot-billed pelican (NT). The white-bellied sea eagle, pariah kite, brahminy kites, kestrel, marsh harriers, and the world's most widespread bird of prey, peregrine falcon, are among the raptors seen here.

Many short-legged shorebirds are also seen in a narrow band along the shifting shores of the lake and islands. These include plovers, the collared pratincole, ruff, dunlin, snipes and sandpipers. Larks, wagtails and lapwings are also found on the mudflats. Feeding in deeper water are the longer-legged avocets, stilts and godwits.

The higher vegetated areas of the lake support moorhens, coots and jacanas. Pond herons and night herons can be seen along the shores with kingfishers and rollers. Little cormorants are seen on perches around the lake, Compact flocks of brahminy ducks, as well as shovellers, pintails, gadwall, teals, pochards, geese and coots, are also seen.

Nesting colonies of gull-billed terns and river terns are seen on the Nalabana Island. In 2002, The Bombay Natural History Society survey recorded 540 nests of the Indian river tern at the island, the largest nesting colony in the southeast Asia.
