= Narayani Temple =

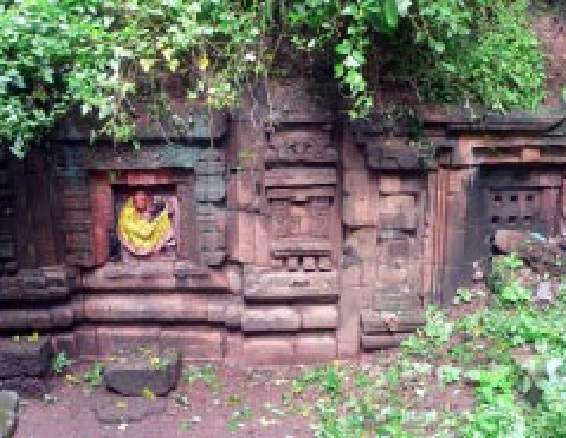

- Location in Odisha

Religion
- Affiliation: Hinduism
- Deity: Durga

Location
- Location: Bhubaneswar
- State: Odisha
- Country: India
- Interactive map of Narayani Temple
- Coordinates: 20°14′35″N 85°50′06″E

Architecture
- Type: Kalingan Style (Kalinga Architecture)
- Completed: 7th century A.D.
- Elevation: 23 m (75 ft)

Narayani Temple is a Hindu temple dedicated to the goddess Durga, located in Bakutagaon village, near Khalikote, Odisha, India. The temple is constructed in the Kalingan style.

Narayani Devi is the goddess of wealth, prosperity, and abundance. She is also the goddess of love, beauty, and grace. She is a compassionate and loving mother goddess, and she is always there to help her devotees.
