= Kalijai =

Hindu temple in Odisha, India

Coordinates: 19.665091°N 85.216016°E

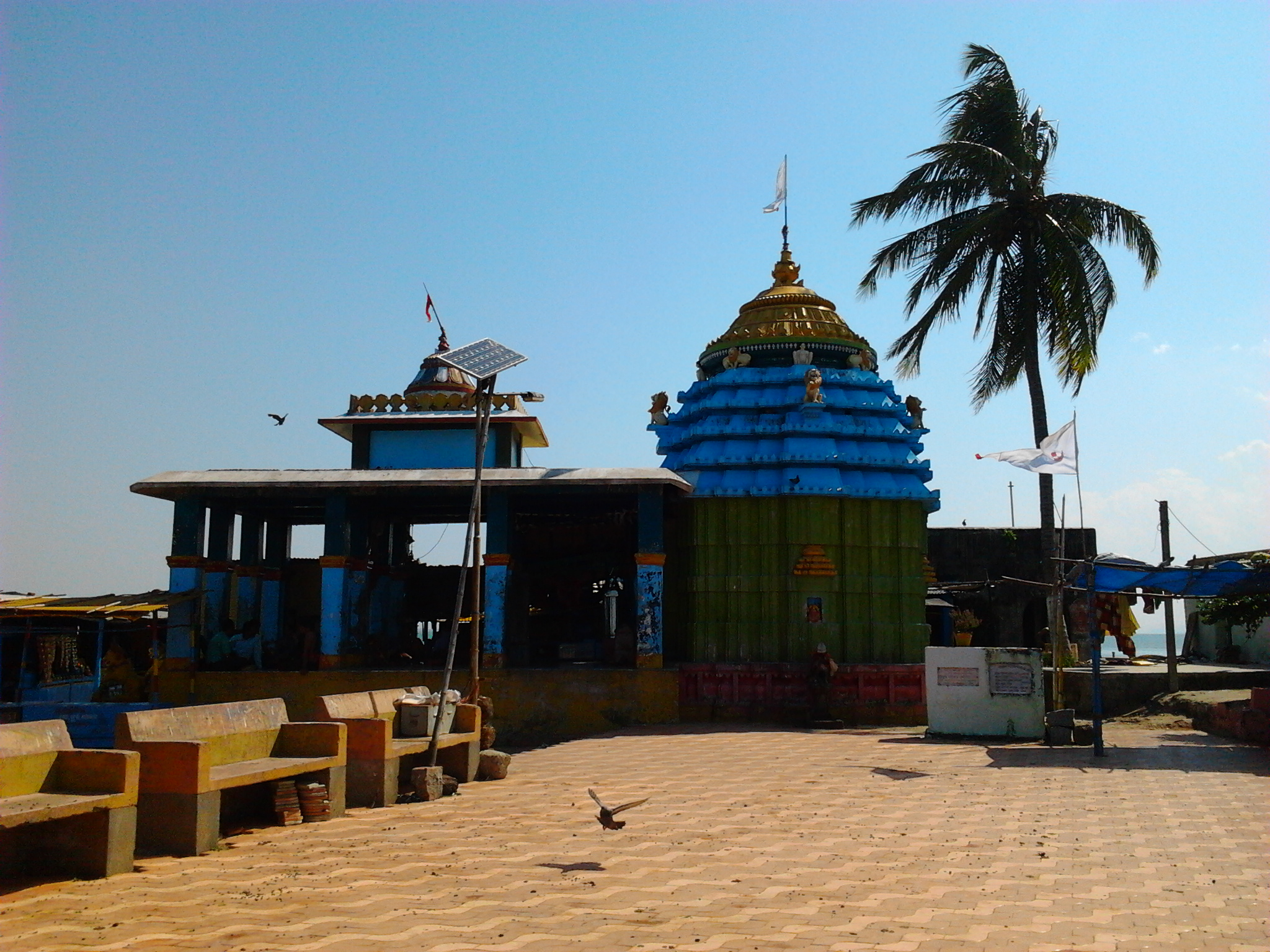
Kalijai Temple

Kalijai Temple, also Kalijai Hill, is located on an island in Chilika Lake. It is considered to be the abode of the Goddess Kalijai. Goddess Kalijai is actually Kali, the source and the first 'Mahavidya' of 'Dasmahavidyas'. Highly revered by the local populace, the deity has been venerated in the local folklores and legends. The island provides an excellent destination for pilgrims as well as tourists. Every year in January, a huge gala fair is held during the festival of Makar Sankranti.

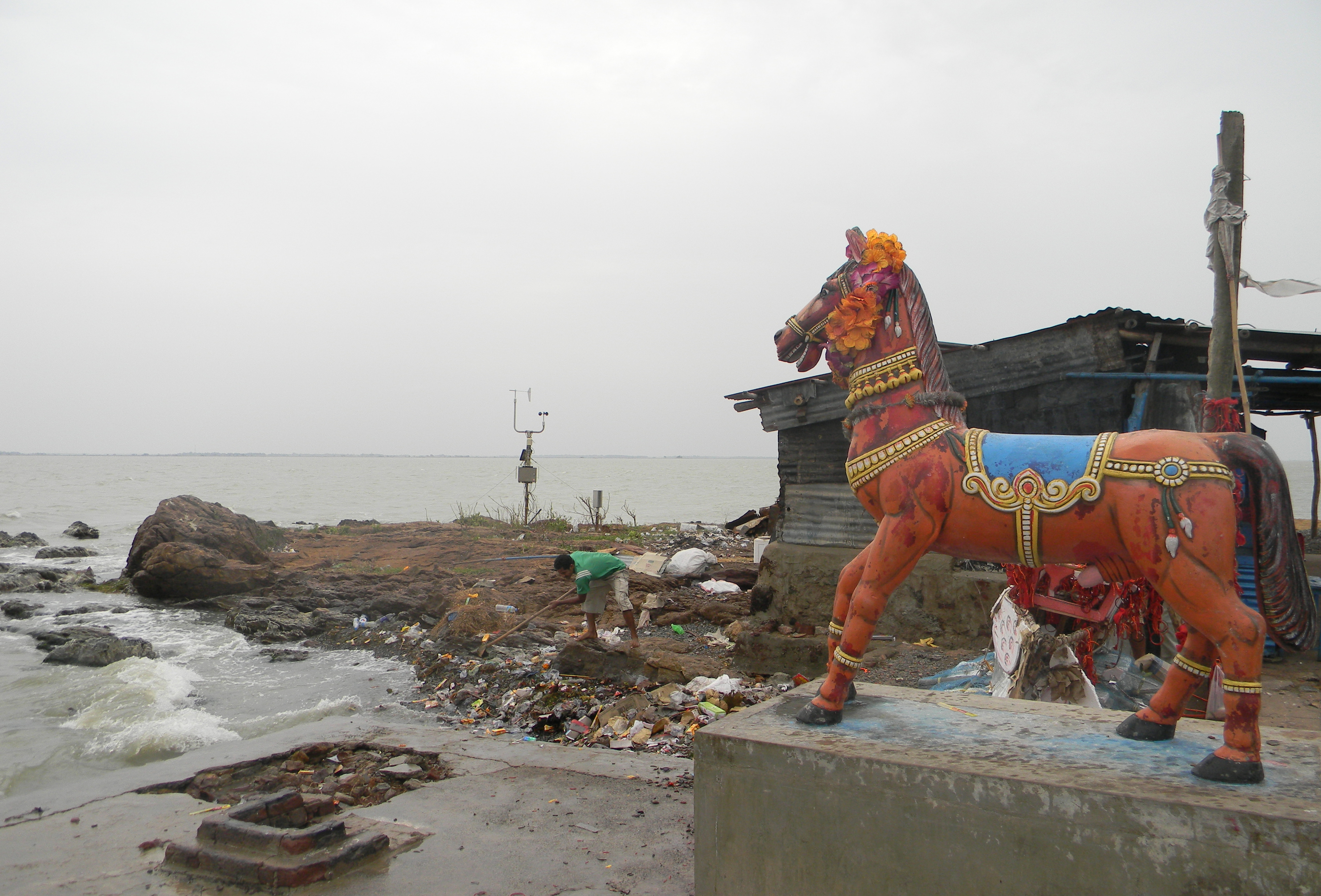
Sculpture at the temple on the lake

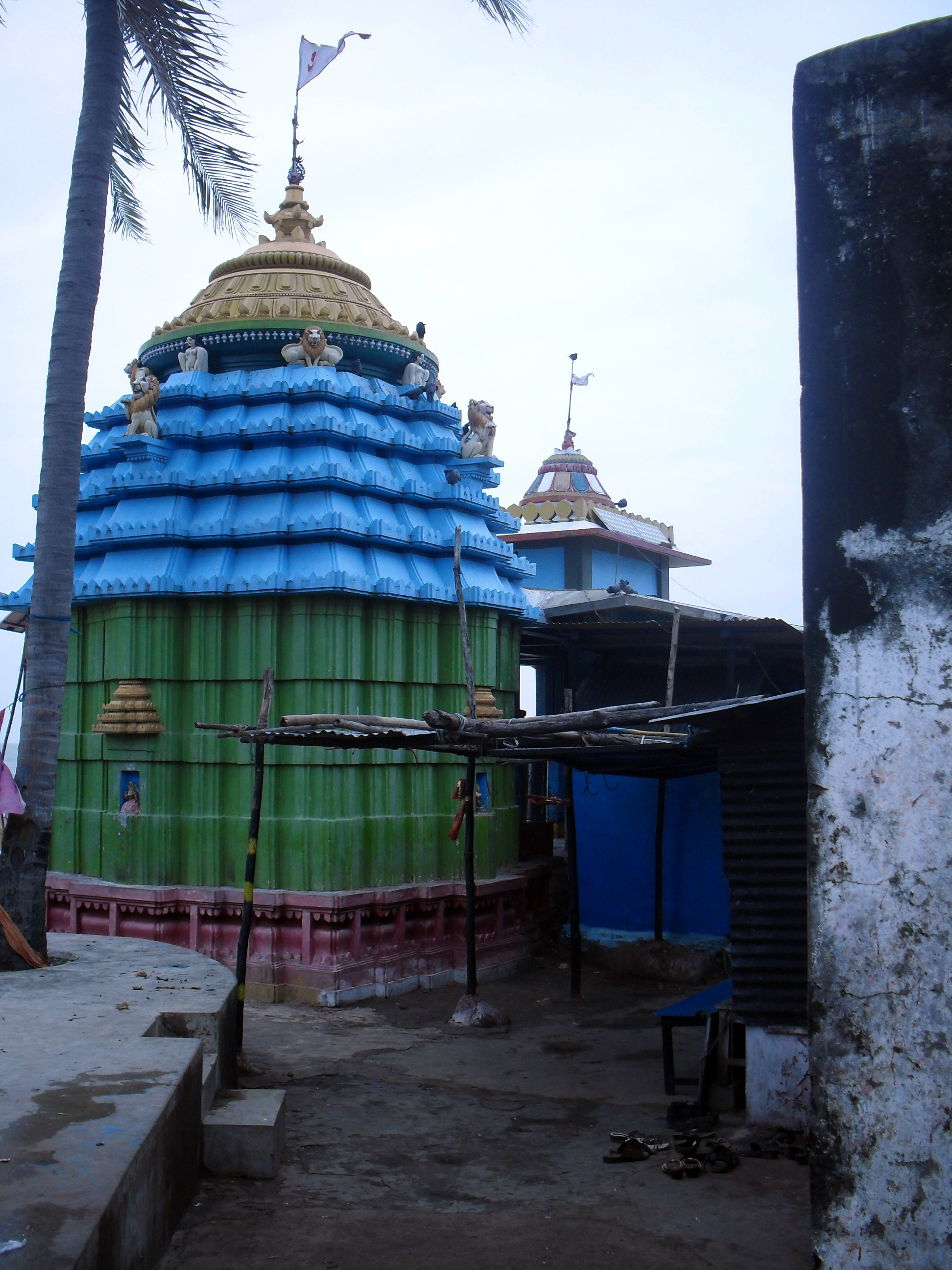
Kalijai Temple

== Legend ==
Legend has it that a newly married girl (named Jaai) along with her father was going to meet her husband. As her in-law's house was on an island in Chilika Lake they had to take a boat to ferry them across the lake. Odisha's coast is very prone to Cyclones and during this boat trip they were encountered with a severe Cyclone, as a result their boat was capsized in the Chilika Lake. Only the boatman and her father survived this event except for the girl Jaai. They searched for her but were unable to locate her. After this accidental death of that newly wed girl, she became the Goddess of people residing nearby and till now, she is worshiped as an EXCERPT of Kali. And, this is how the place got its name.

According to a poem by Pandit Godabarish Mishra, Jaai was a girl who was going to get married in Parikud island. The boat capsized in the storm. She met her tragic death and became the deity Kalijai. However, it's attributed to the imagination of the poet and may not be evidenced. Dr. Radha Charan Panda mentions in The History of Parikud (1930) that this temple was built by Sri Jagannath Mansingh, king of Bankad (currently known as Banapur) in the year 1717.

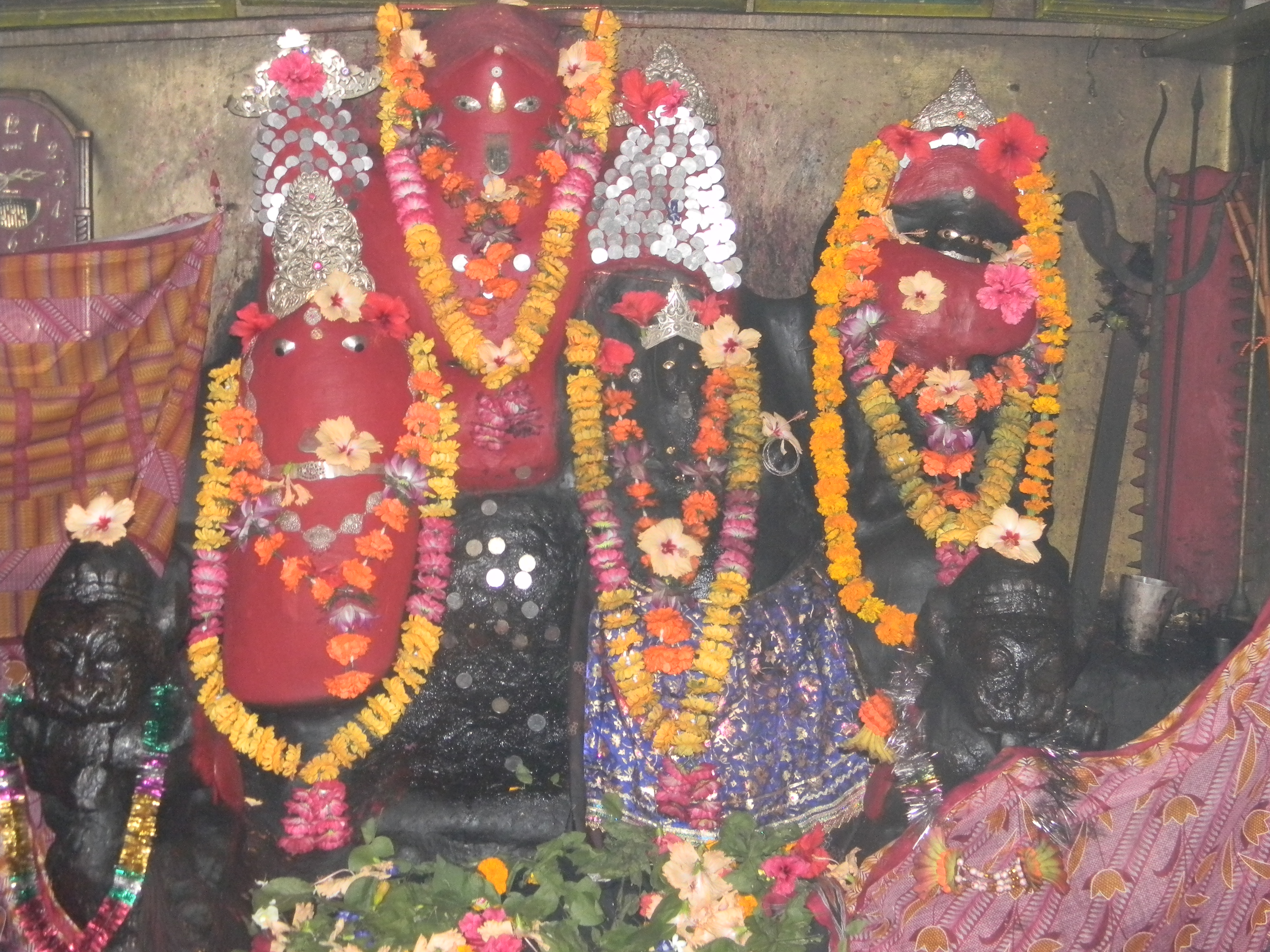
Maa Kalijai at the temple

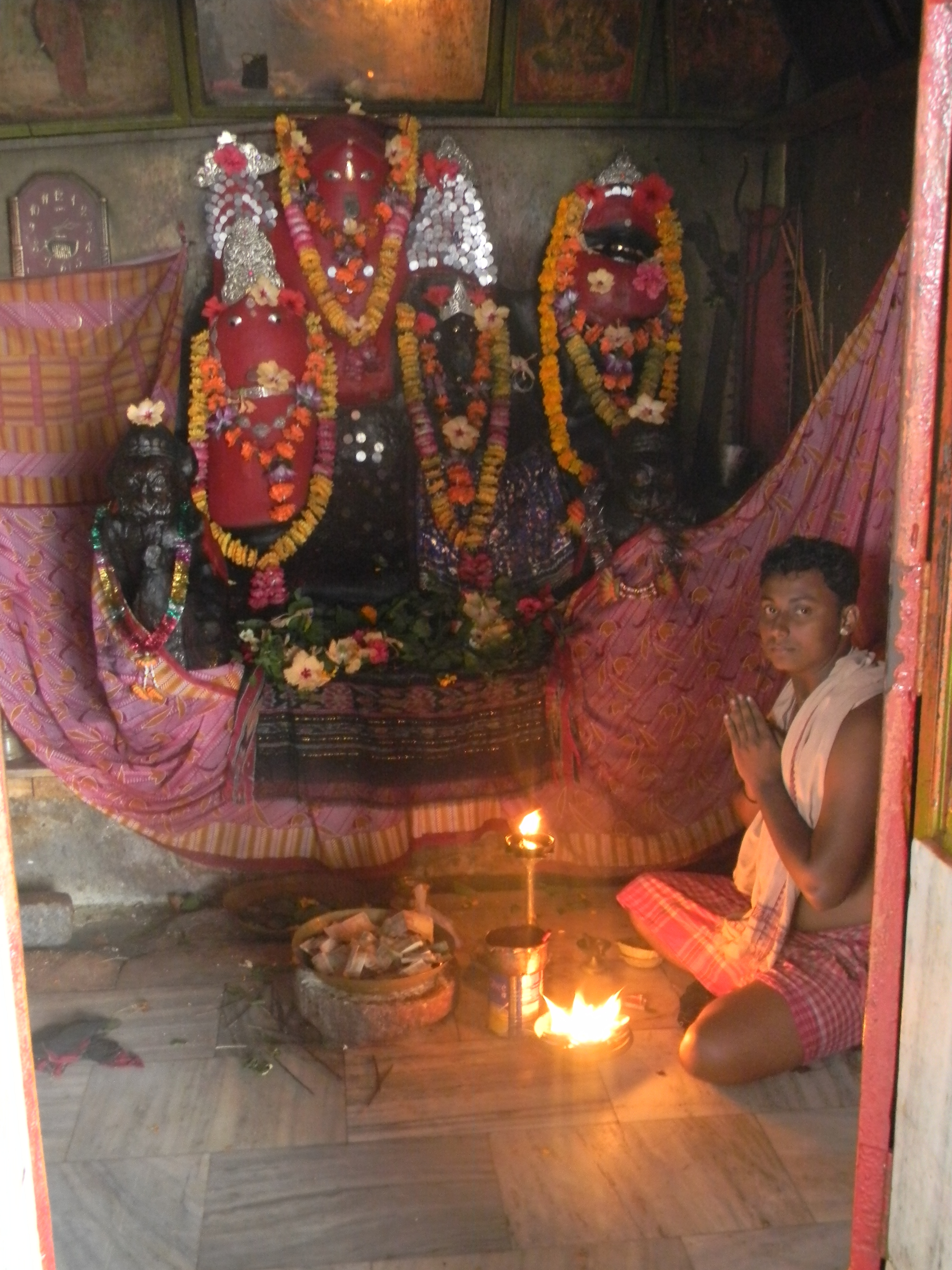
Maa Kalijai

== See also ==
- Chilika Lake
