= Ganjam =

- Town of odisha
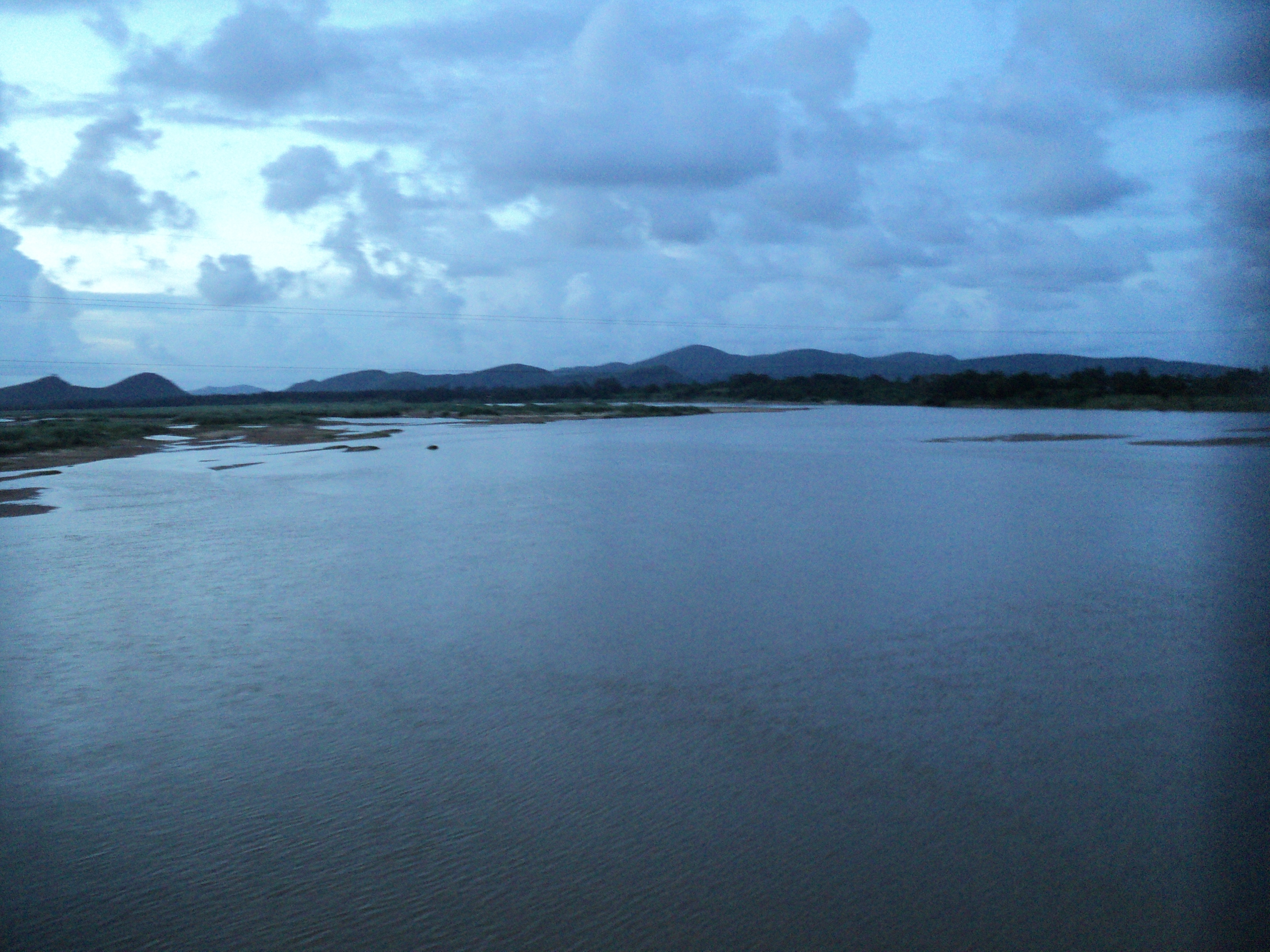
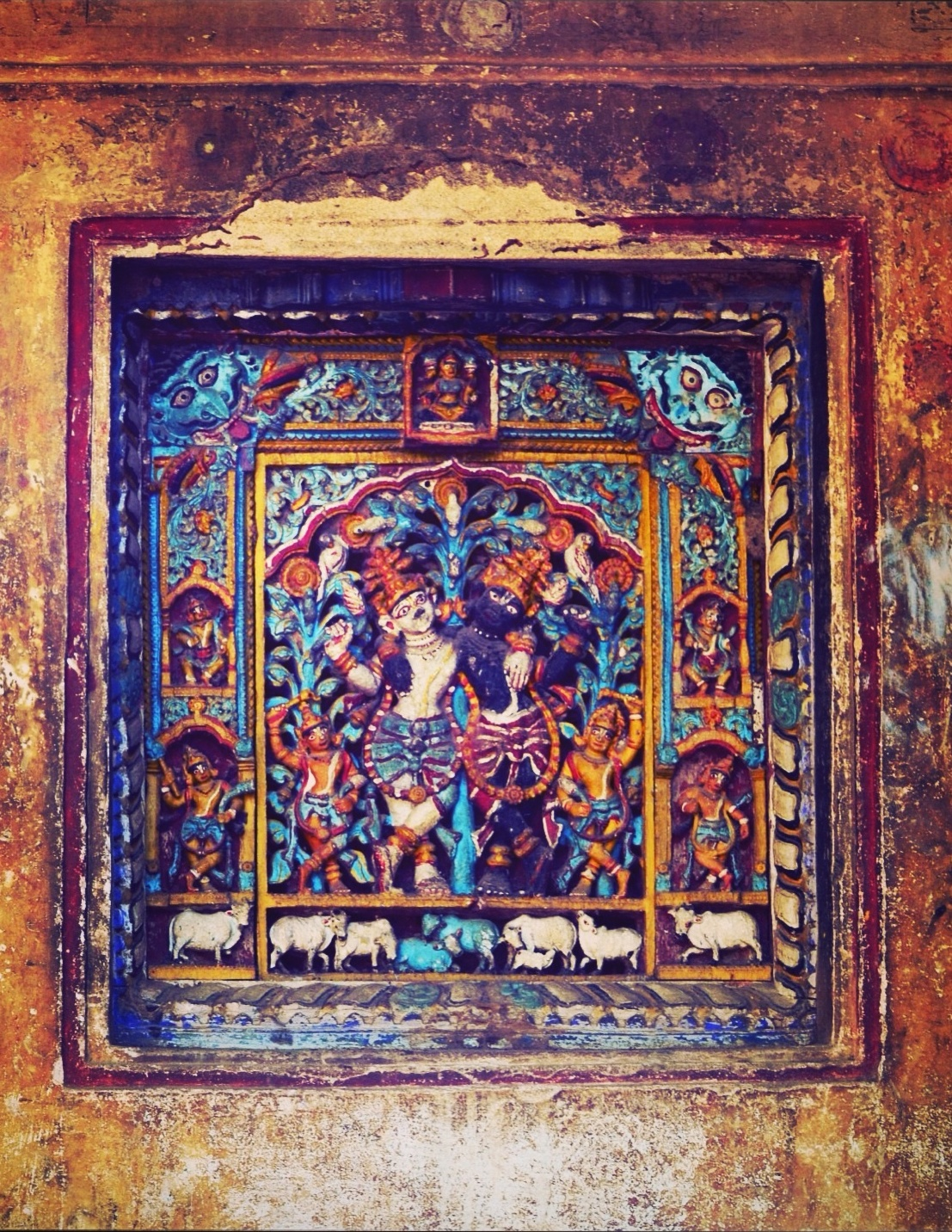
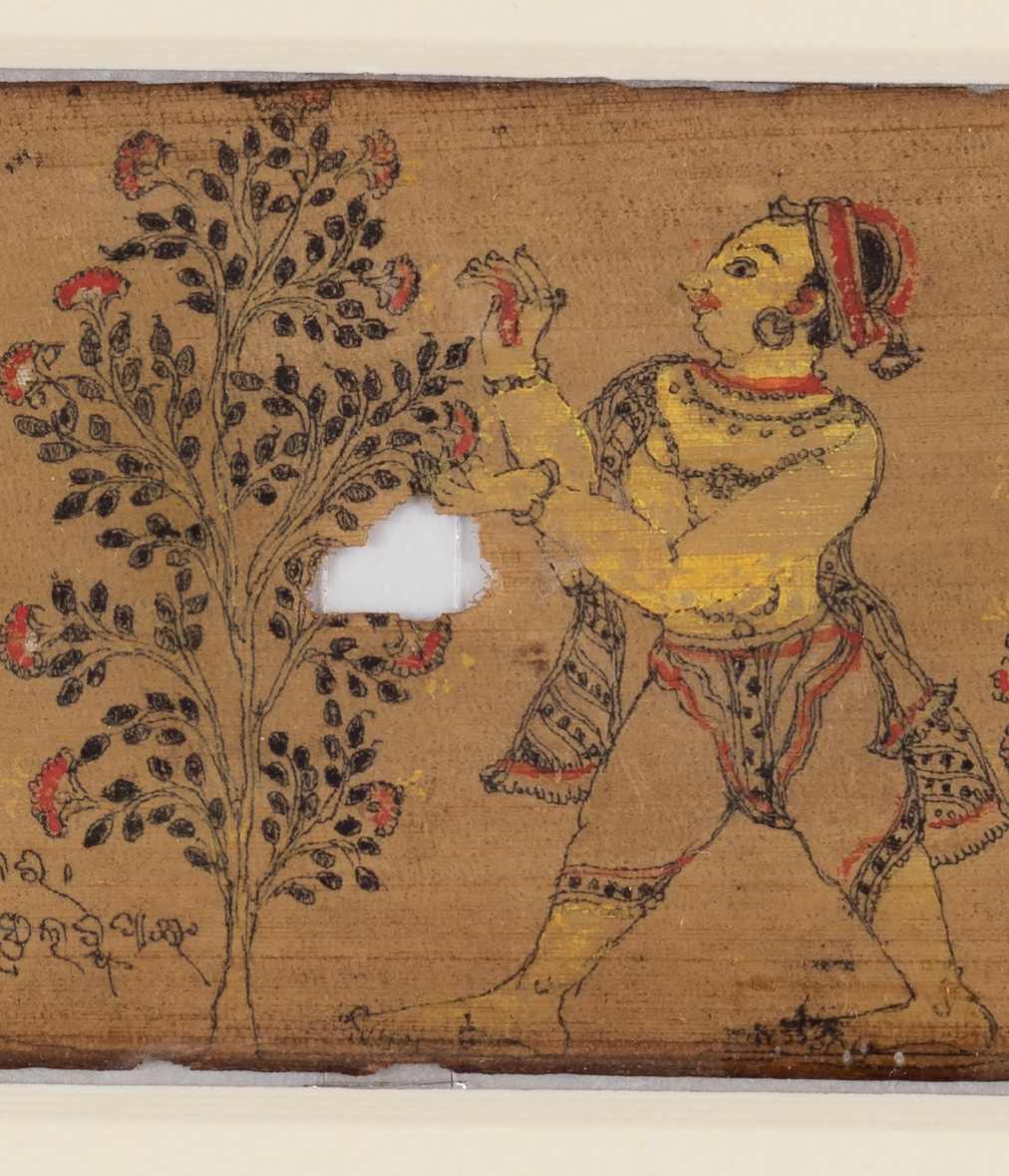
- From Top; Left to Right: Rusikulya River, antique carved window at Buguda, Palm leaf illustration (chitra pothi) of Labanyabati written by Upendra Bhanja, medieval Odia poet from Ghumusar

- Location of Ganjam in Odisha, India Ganjam (India)
- Coordinates: 19.38°N 85.07°E
- Country: India
- State: Odisha
- District: Ganjam
- Named for: Ganjam Fort

Government
  - Body: Government of Odisha
- Elevation: 3 m (9.8 ft)

Population (2011)
  - Total: 11,747

Languages
  - Official: Odia
- Time zone: UTC+5:30 (IST)
- Vehicle registration: OD-07 / 0R-07
- Website: ganjam.nic.in

Ganjam is a town and a notified area council in Ganjam district in the state of Odisha, India. Brahmapur, one of the major cities of Odisha, is situated in this district on the eastern coastline.

== Geography ==
Ganjam is located at 19.38°N 85.07°E in the Ganjam district of Odisha with an elevation of 3 metres (9 feet). Ganjam's mineral-rich coast line extends over 60 km. It provides opportunities for fishing and port facility at Gopalpur for international trade. The rivers like Rushikulya, Dhanei, Bahuda, Ghoda Hada are the source of agriculture and power sectors of the town. Economic wise, Ganjam is a sub industrial town. The Chilika Lake, which attracts tourists, is known for its scenery and a bird sanctuary is situated in the eastern part of district, near the City of Ganjam. Ganjam shares its boundary with Andhra Pradesh. A mix of moist peninsular high and low level Sal forests, tropical moist and dry deciduous and tropical deciduous forest types provide a wide range of forest products and unique lifestyle to wild life. Bhairabi, which consists of 108 temples, is a place of worship and destination for tourists. Taptapani, which consist of a hot sulphur spring that is 56 km from Berhampur, near Ganjam, is also a tourist destination. Tara Tarini Temple sits on Taratarini Hill near Angu. Solaghar, Raipur is also a destination for tourists. Twin Goddess Tara and Tarini are worshipped there. Rushikulya flows at the foot of the Taratarini Hill. The temple of the Goddess Mahuri Kalua is near a picnic spot by the same name located at the center of the town.

It has a railway station, Ganjam railway station, located along the Howrah–Chennai main line.

== Demographics ==
As of 2001 India census, Ganjam had a population of 3529031. Ganjam has an average literacy rate of 63% while male literacy is 70%, and female literacy is 54%. Total Child Population (Age between 0–6 years)are 420158. Sex ratio is 983 and density of the overall population is 429 (persons per km^{2}).

Religion in Ganjam
Hinduism	99.19%
Christianity	0.72%
Other	0.09%

== Economy ==
The town has own international reputation for its cottage industries and handicrafts. The main crafts are brass, appliqué, bamboo craft, stone carving, wood carving, terracotta, textile toys etc. and thousands of artisans are operating individually and through co-operative societies. Cultivation is one of the major occupation in the town, which has engaged approximately 75% of the total workers. Livestock, forestry, fishing, mining, construction, trading and transport are few of the work-related categories being the source of income for another 25% of the workers. The major crops grown in the district are paddy, groundnut, cotton, sugarcane and green vegetables. The district has a prosperous live stock population and potentially is very rich in inland and brackish water fisheries. The Chilika coastal area and extended sea shore are the source of rich marine products which serves for the production of like shells and salt.

=== Ganjam Fort/Potagarh Fort ===
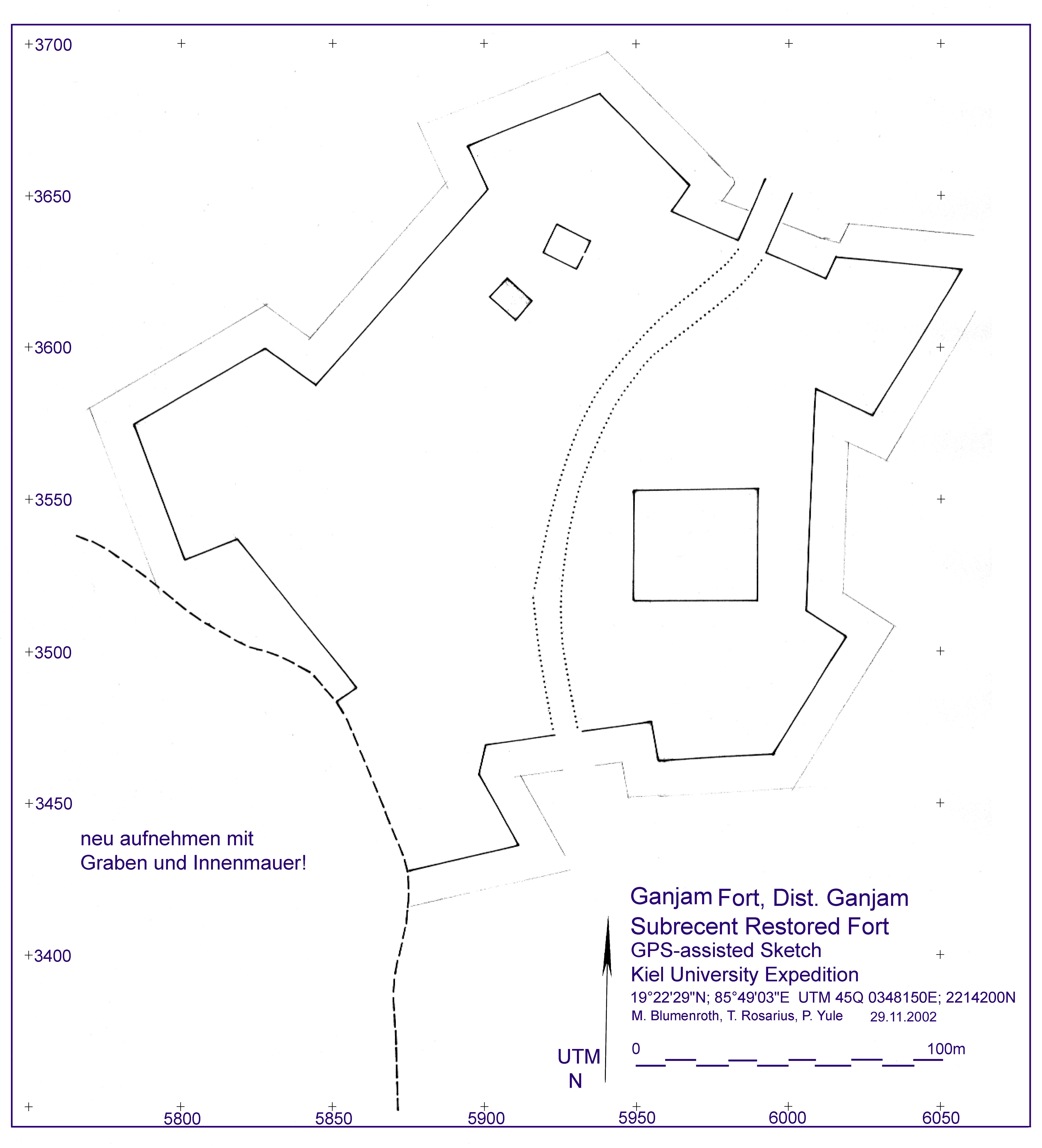
The Ganjam Fort Map

Located at 19.22°N 85.49°E, the Ganjam Fort (also called Potagarh Fort) is the main spot for tourists in Ganjam. This star fort is located 8 km from Chatrapur. The fort of Potagarh was the first Collectorate complex of Ganjam. Later on it was shifted to Berhampur in 1815 and subsequently to Chhatrapur in 1835, where it is still is.

Potagarh or the "buried fort" is named as such since it is buried. It is situated at present near a village named Ganjam on the mouth of the river Rushikulya. The fort is in ruins and still it stands as the mute witness to many rulers, who have used it as their administrative Headquarters to rule over this region named in different periods as Kalinga, Dandapat, Ganjam, Chichacole Circar etc. It is not a single fort, rather a cluster of forts erected by different governments, the remnants of which tell the stories of their administrative procedures. Thus the history of Potagarh is the history of the Ganjam Collectorate that involves the history of Ganjam, Northern Circars, French Government, Madras Presidency, Bengal Presidency and the history of the East India Company as a whole.

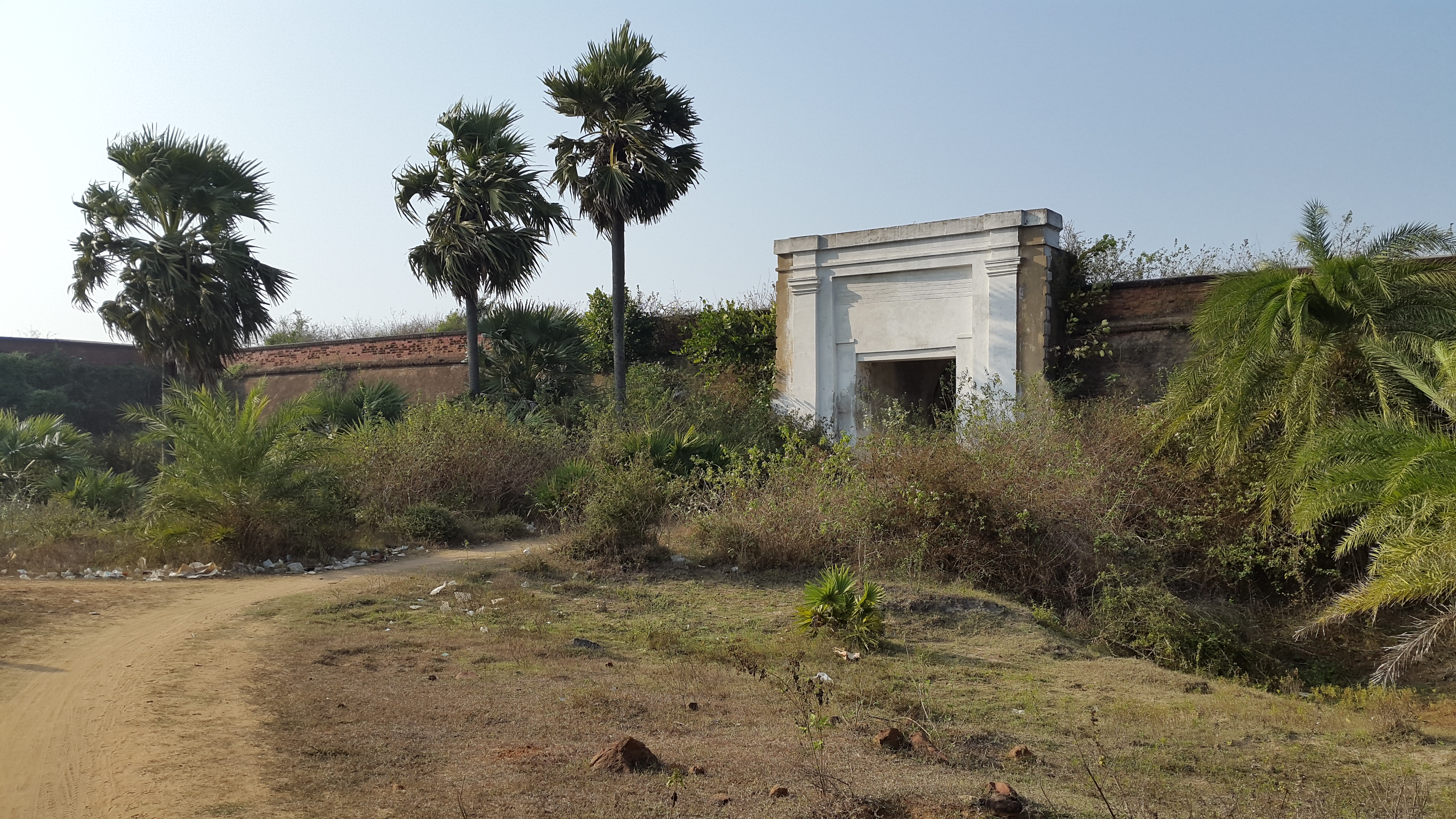
Potagarh fort in Ganjam town

It is said that the construction of Potagarh fort was commenced in 1768 by Edward Costford, the first Resident of Ganjam. But the star-shaped design of the fort and a very old Masjeed standing near it attest more of its Mahammadan origin than British. During the Kutabsahi rule in 17th century Ganjam was extended from Chilika to Chicacole and designated as Chicacole Circar which was the northernmost Circar of the Northern Circars and was controlled from Golconda. In 1641 a Faujdar named Mahammed Khan was appointed in Srikakulam for the first time by Abdul Kutab Shah, the ruler of Golconda. He constructed some fine mosques at Srikakulam and Icchapuram. The old Kalinga Dandapat (Ganjam) was then divided into two divisions namely Chicacole (Srikakulam) and Icchapuram. Most probably it was Mahammed Khan who erected a fort at the present site of Potagarh for administration of Icchapuram division. Some scholars are of the opinion that the fort was erected by the Fourth Sultan Ibrahim Kutabshah.

In 1753 the Northern Circar was granted to the French and Monsieur De Bussy, the French Commander took control over Ganjam and functioned from Potagarh. He must have erected a fort there for him as well as his French people. The presence of the French people is proved by two tombs erected in the cemetery close to Potagarh in honour of two souls of French origin. in 1765, the Northern Circars were granted to English by an imperial farman. French power ended and Edward Costford was appointed as the British Resident of Ganjam in 1766 and took direct charge of Ganjam in 1768. He constructed there another fort. The fort is spread in a vast area close to the river in star-shape. Inside the compound there are three residential buildings of three different architectural designs, most probably assigned to the Mahammadans, French and British. The first one probably of Mahammadan or Kutabshahi origin is completely in ruined state. The other two are also not in so good condition. Besides, two magazine houses are there. Two passages are there in the eastern side of the compound wall opening to the river.

One was probably used as a secret passage to escape into the sea and the other for the queen to go to the river to take bath. The compound wall is about 8' thick with a moat encircling it. The fort has two nicely designed doors, one is in the front side the other one is in the back side, close to the river. The fort of Potagarh is described by the W.W.Hunter having towers in the star angles except in the east front where there is a large gateway, the walls neither under 18 nor above 22 feet in height and a ditch running in three sides in many parts with deep water and in the fourth side defended by a thick wood which runs to 150 yards from the walls". Potagarh tells many stories of horror relating to the wrath of the fort-goddess on the ancient village of Ganjam and the escape of the king through the secret passage into the Bay of Bengal by a boat at the time of attack. The fort Potagarh is an archaeological asset of the state and deserves preservation.

== Art and Culture ==
- Prahlad Natak: An ornate and colourful dance-drama centered on the mythological story of Lord Nrusinghnath and Bhakta Prahallad. It is performed on a tiered stage with elaborate costumes and music.Prahallada Nataka
- Danda Nacha (or Danda Jatra): One of the oldest ritualistic folk dances in India, dedicated to Lord Shiva and Goddess Kali. Performers (Danduas) undergo physical penance, including walking on fire and rolling on hot sand.

== Climate and regional setting ==
Maximum summer temperature is 37 °C; minimum winter temperature is 16 °C. The mean daily temperature varies from 33 °C to 38 °C. May is the hottest month; December is the coldest. The average annual rainfall is 1250 mm and the region receives monsoon and torrential rainfall from July to October.

Climate data for Ganjam, Odisha
Month	Jan	Feb	Mar	Apr	May	Jun	Jul	Aug	Sep	Oct	Nov	Dec	Year
Mean daily maximum °C (°F)	27 (81)	30 (86)	34 (93)	36 (97)	37 (99)	33 (91)	32 (90)	31 (88)	32 (90)	32 (90)	30 (86)	28 (82)	32 (89)
Mean daily minimum °C (°F)	16 (61)	19 (66)	23 (73)	27 (81)	29 (84)	28 (82)	27 (81)	27 (81)	26 (79)	23 (73)	20 (68)	16 (61)	23 (74)
Average rainfall mm (inches)	12.40 (0.49)	17.40 (0.69)	18.60 (0.73)	15.00 (0.59)	40.30 (1.59)	150.00 (5.91)	282.10 (11.11)	272.80 (10.74)	180.00 (7.09)	93.00 (3.66)	33.00 (1.30)	18.60 (0.73)	1,133.2 (44.63)
Source: MSM Weather

== Rewards and recognition ==
=== 1. National Awards for MGNREGS Performance ===
Ganjam district has been twice awarded as the best performing district in MGNREGS at the national level, especially for pioneering direct wage payments to workers’ bank accounts — a model later adopted nationwide.

=== 2.National Water Awards (2022–2023) ===
The district won the 4th National Water Award for outstanding work in water conservation, water body rejuvenation, irrigation development, plantation initiatives, and watershed management. The award was presented by the Vice President of India.

=== 3.National Panchayat Awards (2024) ===
Ganjam achieved a historic feat by securing three National Panchayat Awards, including the prestigious Deen Dayal Upadhyay Panchayat Satat Vikas Puraskar and the Nanaji Deshmukh Sarvottam Panchayat Satat Vikas Puraskar. This added to its record of winning six national panchayat awards in each of the previous two years.
