= Badapokharia =

Village in Odisha, India

Coordinates: 19°59′24″N 85°29′05″E

- Village
- Location in Odisha, India
- Country: India
- State: Odisha
- District: Khordha
- Tehsil: Nirakarpur

Government
  - Type: Panchayati raj

Area
  - Total: 11.13 km^{2} (4.30 sq mi)

Population (2011)
  - Total: 4,267
- Time zone: UTC+5:30 (IST)
- Vehicle registration: OD-02
- Census code: 408003

Badapokharia is a village in the Khordha district of the Indian state of Odisha. It is located within the administrative jurisdiction of the Nirakarpur Police Station.

== Geography ==
Badapokharia is situated in the coastal plains of Odisha. The village covers a geographical area of approximately 1,113 ha (2,750 acres). It is located approximately 35 kilometres (22 mi) from the Biju Patnaik International Airport in Bhubaneswar.

== Demographics ==
According to the 2011 Census of India, Badapokharia had a total population of 4,267, consisting of 2,206 males and 2,061 females. The sex ratio of the village was recorded as 934 females per 1000 males.

== Administration ==
The village is administered by a Sarpanch, who is the elected representative of the village under the Constitution of India and the Panchayati Raj Act of Odisha. It falls under the administrative supervision of the Khordha district headquarters.

== Transport ==
The nearest railway station is Nirakarpur railway station, located approximately 3.5 kilometres (2.2 mi) from the village. The village is connected to the state road network, facilitating transport to nearby towns such as Tangi and Khordha.

== See also ==
- Nirakarpur
- Kamaguru
- Jankia
- Rameswar, Odisha
