= Tankol =

Village in Odisha, India

Tankol ଟାଙ୍କୋଲ
- Village
- Location in Odisha, India Tankol (India)
- Coordinates: 20.007°N 85.455°E
- Country: India
- State: Odisha
- District: Khordha
- Tehsil: Jankia

Area
  - Total: 2.76 km^{2} (1.07 sq mi)

Population (2011)
  - Total: 1,676
  - Density: 607/km^{2} (1,570/sq mi)
- Vehicle registration: OD-02, OD-33
- Census code: 407911

Tankol is a village in the Jankia police station area of Khordha district in the Indian state of Odisha. It is located approximately 45 kilometres (28 mi) from the state capital, Bhubaneswar.

== Geography ==
Tankol is located at 20.007°N 85.455°E. The village has a total geographical area of 276 hectares (2.76 km^{2}). It falls under the administrative jurisdiction of the Jankia Tehsil (sub-district).

== Demographics ==
As per the 2011 Census of India, Tankol had a total population of 1,676, comprising 834 males and 842 females. The village has a sex ratio of 1010 females for every 1000 males, which is higher than the Odisha state average of 979.

The literacy rate of Tankol was 83.06% in 2011, significantly higher than the state average of 72.87%. Male literacy stood at 89.08%, while female literacy was 76.98%.

About 11.9% of the population (200 children) were under the age of six.

== Administration ==
The village is administered by a Sarpanch, who is the elected representative of the village under the Panchayati Raj act. It falls under the Jankia police station jurisdiction in the Khordha district.

== Transport ==
The nearest railway station is Bhusandpur railway station, located approximately 7 kilometres (4.3 mi) from the village.

== See also ==
- Khordha district
- List of villages in India
