= Bhusandapur =

Village in Odisha, India

Bhusandapur ଭୁଷଣ୍ଡପୁର
- Village
- Bhusandapur Railway Station in Entry Front

- Location in Odisha, India
- Coordinates: 19.9518°N 85.4765°E
- Country: India
- State: Odisha
- District: Khordha district
- Block: Tangi
- Time zone: UTC+5:30 (IST)
- PIN: 752036
- Station Code: BSDP

Bhusandapur (also spelled Bhusandpur) is a village located in the Tangi block of the Khordha district in the Indian state of Odisha. It is situated near the northern banks of Chilika Lake. The village is served by the Bhusandpur railway station, which falls under the jurisdiction of the East Coast Railway zone.

== Geography ==
Bhusandapur is located at 19.9518°N 85.4765°E. It is approximately 65 kilometres (40 mi) from the state capital, Bhubaneswar.

== Transport ==
The village is connected to the Indian railway network via the Bhusandpur railway station (Station code: BSDP). This station lies on the Howrah–Chennai main line and is a stopping point for several passenger and express trains managed by the Khurda Road railway division.

== Culture and landmarks ==
The village is known for its proximity to the Maa Ugra Tara Temple located in the nearby Mulajharigarh village. The temple is a significant Shakta pitha and a major pilgrimage site for the region.

== Incidents ==
In March 2023, the village received significant media coverage following a firecracker explosion that resulted in four fatalities. The incident drew attention to illegal firecracker manufacturing units in the region.
