= Jhinkijhari =

- Village
- Location in Odisha, India Jhinkijhari (India)
- Coordinates: 20.554°N 86.3612°E
- Country: India
- State: Odisha
- District: Khordha

Population (2011)
  - Total: 2,015

Languages
  - Official: Oriya
- Time zone: UTC+5:30 (IST)
- PIN: 752018
- Telephone code: 06755
- Vehicle registration: OD
- Website: odisha.gov.in

Jhinkijhari is a village in Khordha district in the state of Odisha, India.

== Demographics ==
As of 2011 India census, Jhinkijhari had a population of 2015. The village belongs to Nijigarh Tapang Gram panchayat. Nearby villages of Jhinkijhari are Nijigada Tapanga, Anda, Bajapur, Durgapur, Dhaulimuhan, Malipada, etc.

== Transportation ==
The village is accessible through motorable road from Khordha Town which is 10 km away. Nearest Rail head is Khurda Road Junction, which is 23 km away. Bhubaneswar Railway Station is 40.8 km from the village. The village is 3 km from NH 5 at Tapanga Chhak.

== Education Facilities ==
The village is having a school running classes from class I to VII. Children of the village go to Kaviraj Chintamani Vidyapitha, Nijigada Tapange for High school education.

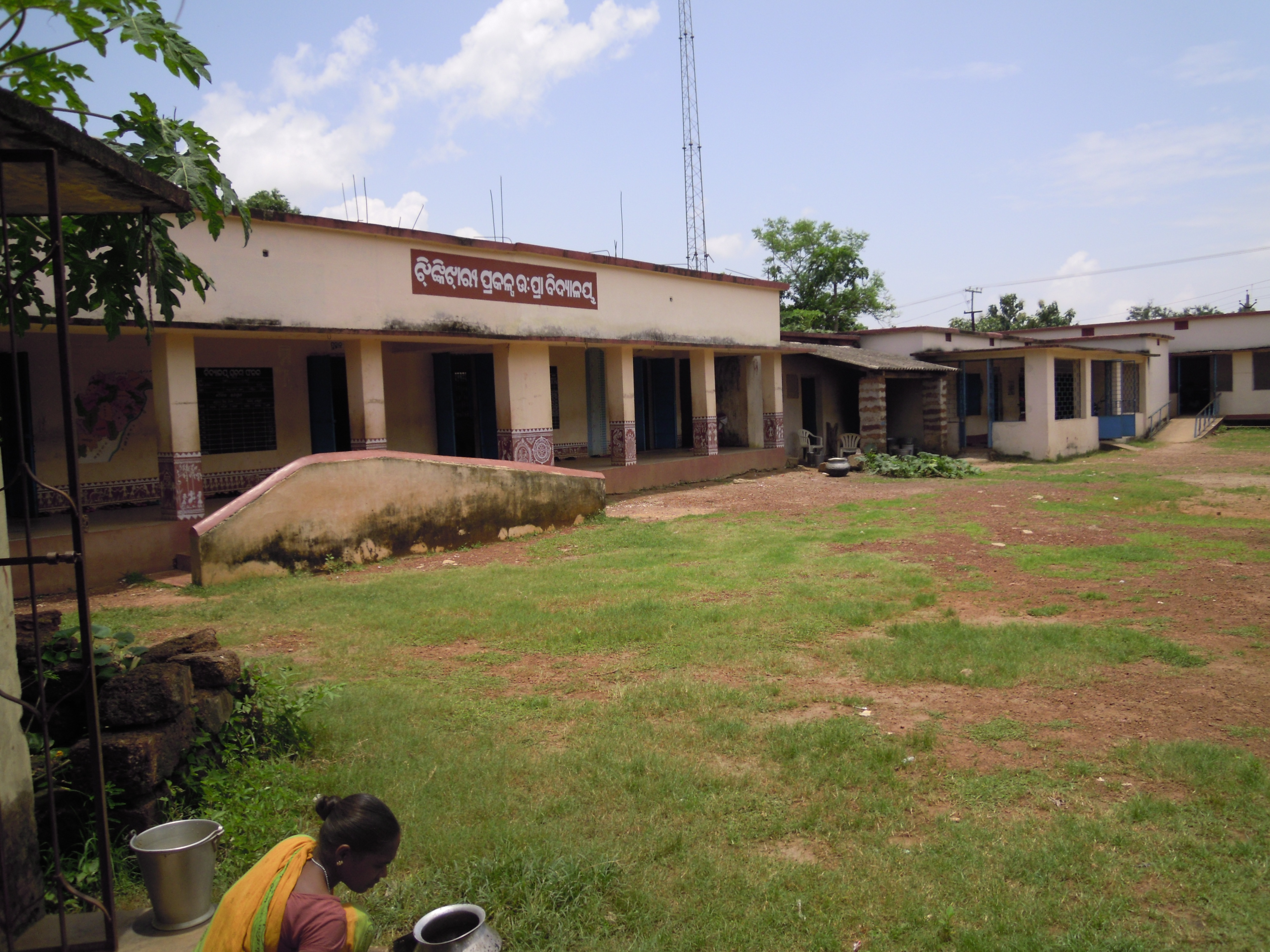
Jhinkijhari ME School(Estd 1956), Jhinkijhari
