= Kamaguru =

Village in Odisha, India

Kamaguru କାମଗୁରୁ
- Village
- Location in Odisha, India
- Country: India
- State: Odisha
- District: Khordha
- Tehsil: Jankia

Government
  - Type: Panchayati Raj

Area
  - Total: 195 ha (480 acres)

Population (2011)
  - Total: 1,359
  - Density: 697/km^{2} (1,810/sq mi)
- Time zone: UTC+5:30 (IST)
- PIN: 752021

Kamaguru is a village in the Khordha district of the Indian state of Odisha. It is governed by the Kamaguru Gram Panchayat and falls under the administrative jurisdiction of the Jankia Police Station limits.

== Demographics ==
As of the 2011 Census of India, Kamaguru had a total population of 1,359, consisting of 692 males and 667 females. The village comprised 289 households.

The literacy rate of the village was recorded at 91.03%, which is significantly higher than the state average for Odisha. Male literacy stood at 93.78%, while female literacy was 88.15%.

== Administration ==
In accordance with the Panchayati Raj Act, the village is administrated by a Sarpanch (Head of Village), who is the elected representative of the village. Kamaguru is a recognized Gram Panchayat within the Khordha district.

== Geography ==
The village covers a geographical area of 195 hectares (1.95 km²). It is located approximately 5 km from the nearest railway station, Bhusandpur railway station.
