= Chhanagiri =

Village in Odisha, India

Chhanagiri ଛଣଗିରି
- Village
- Location in Odisha, India Chhanagiri (India)
- Coordinates: 20.08°N 85.55°E
- Country: India
- State: Odisha
- District: Khordha
- Block: Jankia

Area
  - Total: 1.10 km^{2} (0.42 sq mi)

Population (2011)
  - Total: 1,637
  - Density: 1,490/km^{2} (3,850/sq mi)
- Time zone: UTC+5:30 (IST)
- PIN: 752020
- Gram panchayat: Chhanagiri

Chhanagiri is a village and Gram panchayat located in the Jankia Tehsil of Khordha district in the Indian state of Odisha. It is situated approximately 24 kilometres (15 mi) from the district headquarters in Khordha and falls under the jurisdiction of the Jankia police station.

== Geography ==
Chhanagiri is located at the coordinates 20.08°N 85.55°E within the coastal plains of Odisha. The village covers a total geographical area of 110 hectares (1.1 km^{2}). It is bounded by agricultural lands and small water bodies typical of the Khordha region.

The settlement is situated approximately 6.79 km from the Nirakarpur railway station and roughly 33 km from Biju Patnaik Airport in Bhubaneswar. The village is part of the Jankia Community Development Block and is well-connected by road to nearby settlements such as Golabai, Olasinha, and Rameswar. The local climate is tropical, characterized by hot summers, high humidity during the monsoon, and mild winters.

== Demographics ==
As per the 2011 Census of India, Chhanagiri had a total population of 1,637, consisting of 832 males and 805 females. The sex ratio of the village was 968 females per 1,000 males, which was lower than the Odisha state average of 979 at the time.

The village reported a literacy rate of 86.57%, significantly higher than the state average of 72.87%. Male literacy stood at 92.94%, while female literacy was 80.06%. Approximately 10.87% of the population was under the age of six. The census recorded 309 households in the village.

== Administration ==
Chhanagiri is administered by a Sarpanch, who is the elected representative of the village as per the Constitution of India and the Panchayati Raj Act. It serves as the headquarters for the Chhanagiri Gram Panchayat. The village falls under the administrative division of the Puri postal division, with the Postal Index Number (PIN) 752020.

== See also ==
- Khordha district
- Jankia
