= Dungamal =

- Town
- Location in Odisha, India Dungamal (India)
- Coordinates: 19.7077°N 85.1793°E
- Country: India
- State: Odisha
- District: Khordha

Population (2001)
  - Total: 6,206

Languages
  - Official: Oriya
- Time zone: UTC+5:30 (IST)
- PIN: 752037
- Vehicle registration: OD
- Website: odisha.gov.in

Dungamal (Chhatragarh) is a census town in the Khordha district in the state of Odisha which is 7 km from Balugaon NAC. It is the location of an Indian Navy basic training center (INS CHILKA).

It was originally a fort belonging to Khurdagarh under Banpur King Banasura. To protect the kingdom, a big canal was built that linked Chilka Lake to Mountain Bhaleri. Near to Ava Hospital, there is a Big Jagannath Temple, Guru Dwara.

== Demographics ==
As of 2001 census of India, Dungamal had a population of 6206. Males constitute 63% of the population and females 37%. Dungamal has an average literacy rate of 83%, higher than the national average of 59.5%: male literacy is 90% and female literacy is 70%. In Dungamal, 9% of the population is under 6 years of age.
