= Airfield (Kapila Prasad) =

Airfield Kapila Prasad
- Census sub-district
- Location within Odisha Location within India
- Coordinates: 20.1818386°N 85.7876705°E
- Country: India
- State: Odisha
- District: Khordha

Population (2011)
  - Total: 13,445

Languages
  - Official: Odia
- Time zone: UTC+5:30 (IST)
- Vehicle registration: OD-02

Airfield, also known as Kapila Prasad, is a census sub-district in Khordha district, Odisha, India, lying between Bhubaneswar and Jatani. In the 2011 census it had a population of 13,445.

It is 15km (9.3 mi) from Bhubaneswar, 11km (6.8 mi) from Biju Patnaik International Airport and Jatani town and 20km (12mi) from Khordha, the district headquarters.

== Demographics ==
Religions in Airfield (Kapila Prasad):
1. Hinduism (97.6%)
2. Christianity (1.71%)
3. Islam (0.62%)
4. Sikhism (0.01%)
5. Buddhism (0.01%)
6. Not Stated (0.04%)

Chirstian literacy was 98.15%

Hindu population is highest at 97.60%, as Hinduism is common in Odisha. The Christian population is second, at 1.71% and Islam is at 3rd ranking which covers 0.62% of population. 0.04% of the population are not stated.

Type of employment:
1. Other services and industries (54.4%)
2. Cultivators (22.5%)
3. Agriculture labourers (20.5%)
4. Household industries (2.60%)

Other services and industries is popular among the people, with cultivators being second popular employment. 3rd ranking are agricultural labourers, with 20.5% participating. The least popular employment is household industries at 2.6%.

1. Scheduled castes (21.0%)
2. Scheduled tribes (0.72%)
3. Not indigenous (78.2%)

The vast majority of the population is not indigenous (78.2%), with Scheduled Castes at 21.0% of population and the lowest being Scheduled Tribes at 0.72%.

The total literacy was 89.52%, with males having 93.43% literacy and females having 85.3% literacy.
