= Mangalajodi =

Village in Odisha, India

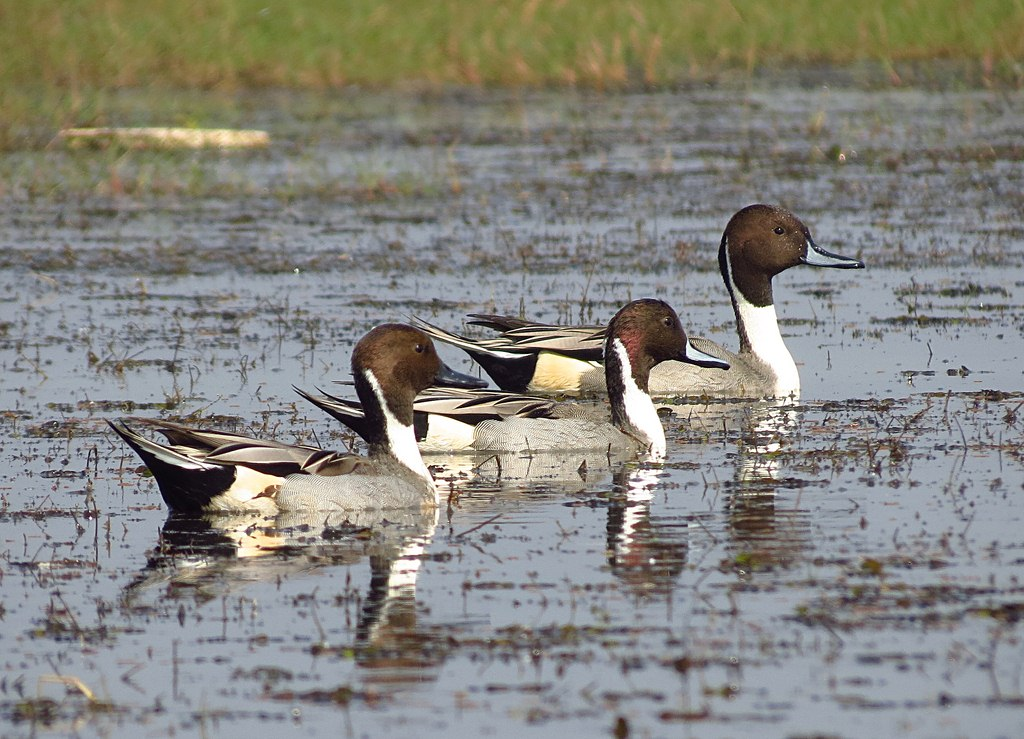
Northern pintails at Mangalajodi

Mangalajodi is an olden village under Tangi block in Khordha district of Odisha at the northern edge of Chilika Lake. The scenery of this village and its wetlands attracts the visitors. In 2017, this village was declared and functioning as a separate Grama Panchayat (Mangalajodi Grama Panchayat).

== Demographics ==
According to the 2011 Census of India:

Total No. of Houses: 780

Total population: 3,972 (male: 2051, female: 1921)

Children (0–6 years): 553 (male: 293, female: 260)

Schedule Caste total: 2741 (male: 1419, female: 1322)

Schedule Tribe total: 1 (male: 0, female: 1)

Literacy 67.01% (male: 74.46%, female: 59.12%)

Total workers 1292 (male: 1163, female: 129)

In Mangalajodi village, most of the villagers are from Schedule Caste (SC). Schedule Caste constitutes 69.01% while Schedule Tribe (ST) were 0.03% of total population in Mangalajodi village. Mangalajodi village has lower literacy rate compared to Orissa. In 2011, literacy rate of Mangalajodi village was 67.01% compared to 72.87% of Orissa.

== Nature ==
The wetlands attract large numbers of migratory birds each winter, with peak-season counts reported at over 150,000 birds. Migratory species are generally present between November and March. The wetland forms part of Chilika Lake, which was designated a Ramsar Wetland of International Importance in 1981, the first such site in India.

== Avi-fauna ==
Mangalajodi is known as "heaven" of water birds. Amongst the birds seen here Lesser Whistling-Duck, Garganey, Ruddy Shelduck, Little Grebe, Northern Shoveler, Knob-billed Duck, Gadwall, Indian Spot-billed Duck, Asian Palm-Swift, Ruddy-breasted Crake, Gray-headed Swamphen, Watercock, Baillon's Crake, Pheasant-tailed Jacana, Bronze-winged Jacana are worth mention. Beside those birds Slaty-breasted Rail, Pacific Golden-Plover, Greater Painted-Snipe, Black-tailed Godwit, Ruff, Common Snipe, Collared Pratincole, Oriental Pratincole, Brown-headed Gull, Whiskered Tern, Little Cormorant, Yellow Bittern, Purple Heron, Cattle Egret, Osprey, White-throated Kingfisher, Pied Kingfisher, Citrine Wagtail are also seen here.

== Culture ==
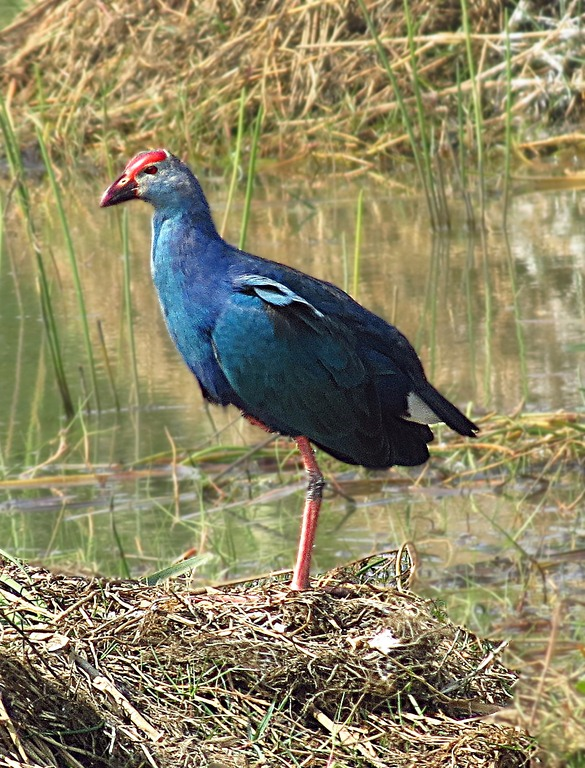
A purple swamphen

This village is not only known as a birding destination for Eco-tourism, but also for ritual performances of local villagers. Many occasions and festivals are celebrated in Mangalajodi. Danda Yatra is one of the oldest, celebrated in the month of Chaitra, performed by the villagers in an amazing way for imparting Indian culture and social-upliftment. Paika Akhada is another dance performed by some villagers.

== Education ==
There is in Mangalajodi, two primary schools, one Middle English School and one High School. Besides, six Anganwadi and Mini-Anganwadi schools are functioning.

=== Literary publication ===
A literary digital magazine, Banamallira Mahak, based upon Odia literature and culture has been published in Mangalajodi. Banamallira Mahak is a non-profit digital web magazine, whose aim is to store and promote Odia literature worldwide. A digital platform for self expression by the writers, their literary creativity and thoughts round the globe.

=== Antiquities ===
Patita Paban Temple is an ancient, and the biggest, temple of this village. Besides this, Gupteswar Temple, Nilakathaswara Dev Temple, Gadiswar Dev Pitha, Maa Mangala Temple, Maa Bimala Temple, Maa Brahmani Devi Temple, Maa Tara Devi Pitha and Maa Balimajhi Devi Temple and Maa Raulani are the famous religious spots of this village. The ancient legend of these temples gives a unique religious status of Mangalajodi. Maa Balimajhi Devi Temple surrounds a local picnic spot of this village.

== Industry ==
Country boat manufacturing units are established in this village and have supplied different types of wooden boats to government and public.

== Transportation ==
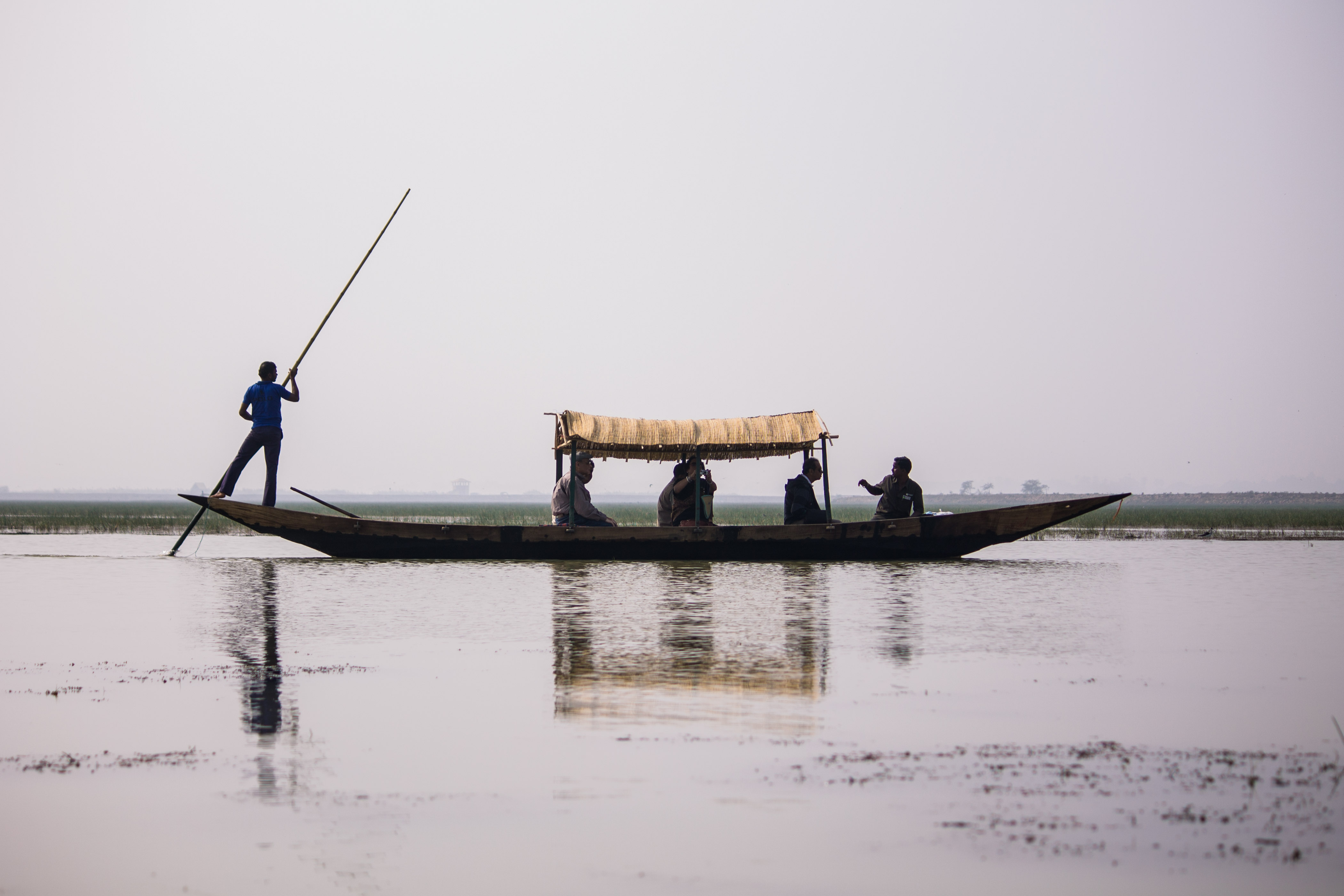
A boat in the Mangalajodi wetland

Mangalajodi is easy to reach by rail or road. The nearest passenger rail stop is Muketashwar railway station which is nearest to the Mangalajodi. The nearest bus stop is Tangi, 60 km from Bhubaneswar towards Berhampur through NH16. Kalupara Ghat railway station is another nearby railway station where some of the Express Trains stop.

== Community Organisation ==
Society for education employment and empowerment was an institution has set-up by the Mr Sumanta Behera in village and an initiative supporters are Bakul Foundation, Satyanagar-16, Bhubaneswar-2, Utkal University, OUAT, Odisha, Ananda Agriculture University, IIMA and XIMB Alumnus and all calm as it was working for education, open library facilities and conduct awareness campaign to Bird poachers for protecting Birds of chillika lake. Indian Grameen Services in partnership with RBS Foundation supported the community and capacitate them by establishing a community managed Ecotourism Trust in the name of "Mangalajodi Ecotourism Trust" who are managing ecotourism at Mangalajodi, resulting the creation of alternative livelihoods for the local community.

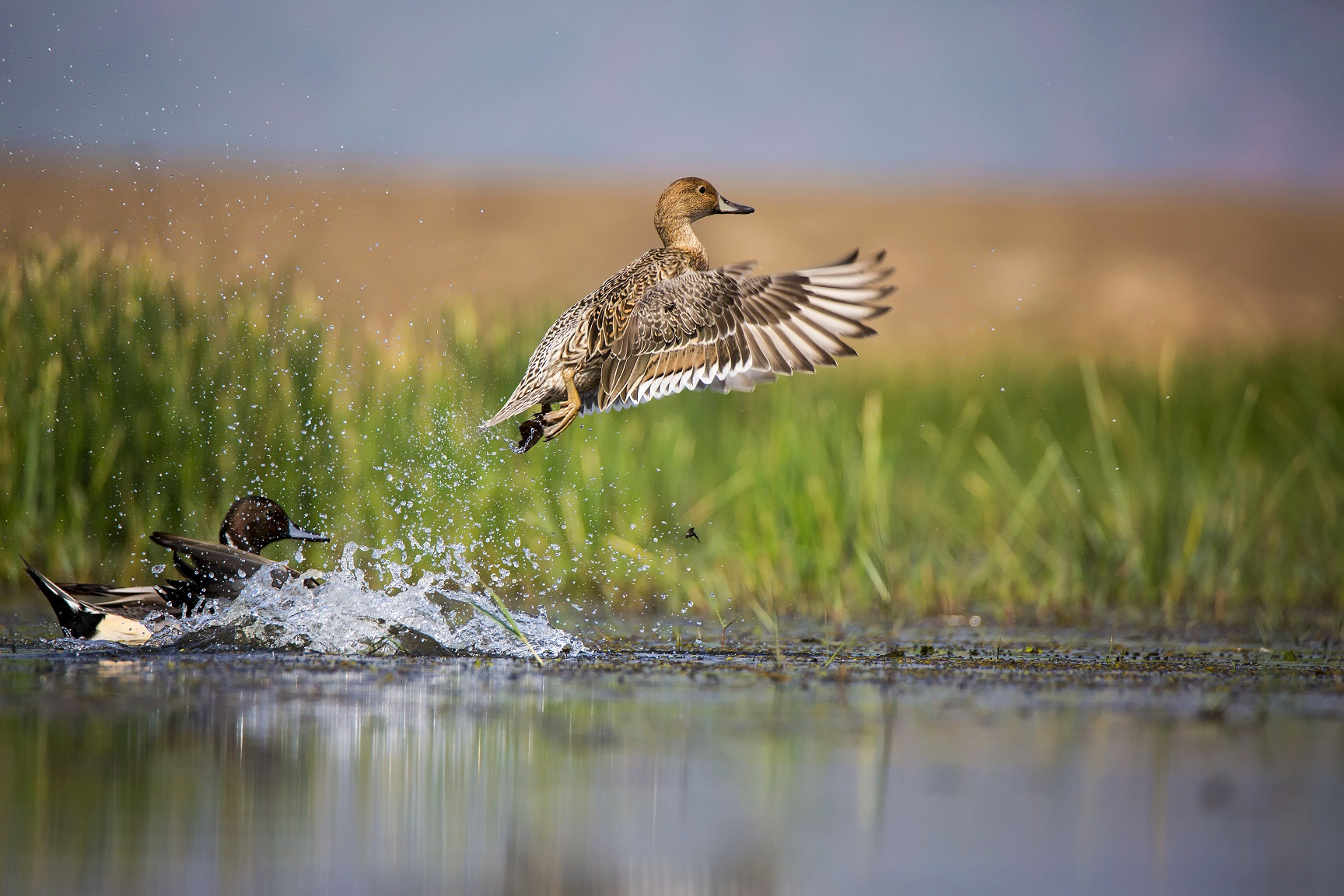
Northern pintail

== Bird Images ==
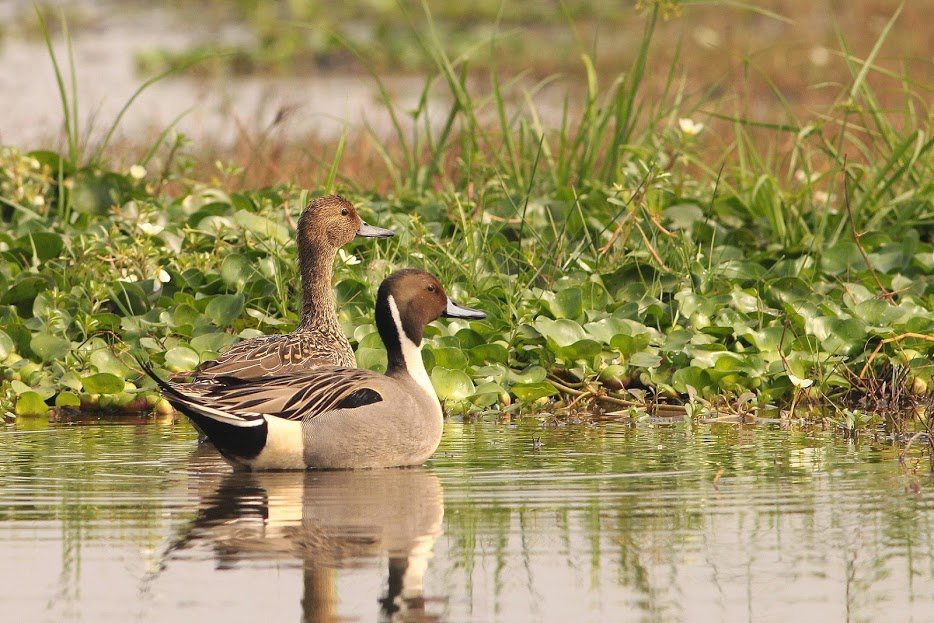
Northern Pintail

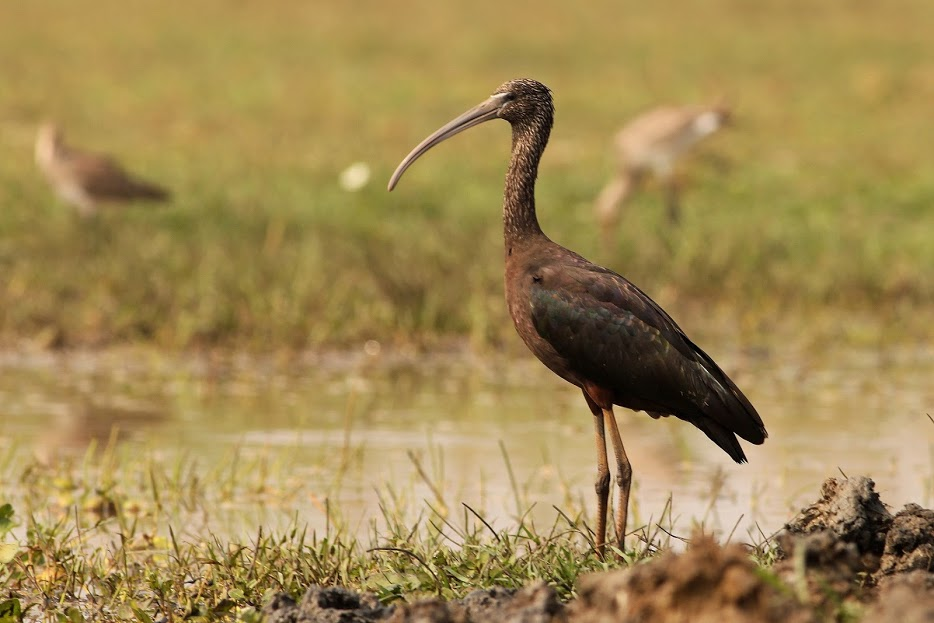
Glossy Ibis

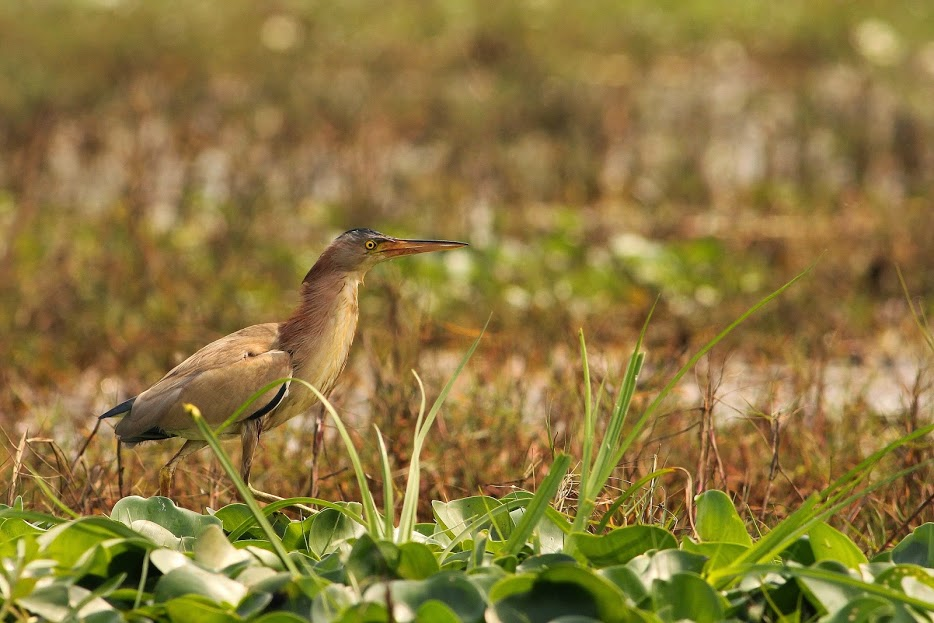
Yellow Bittern

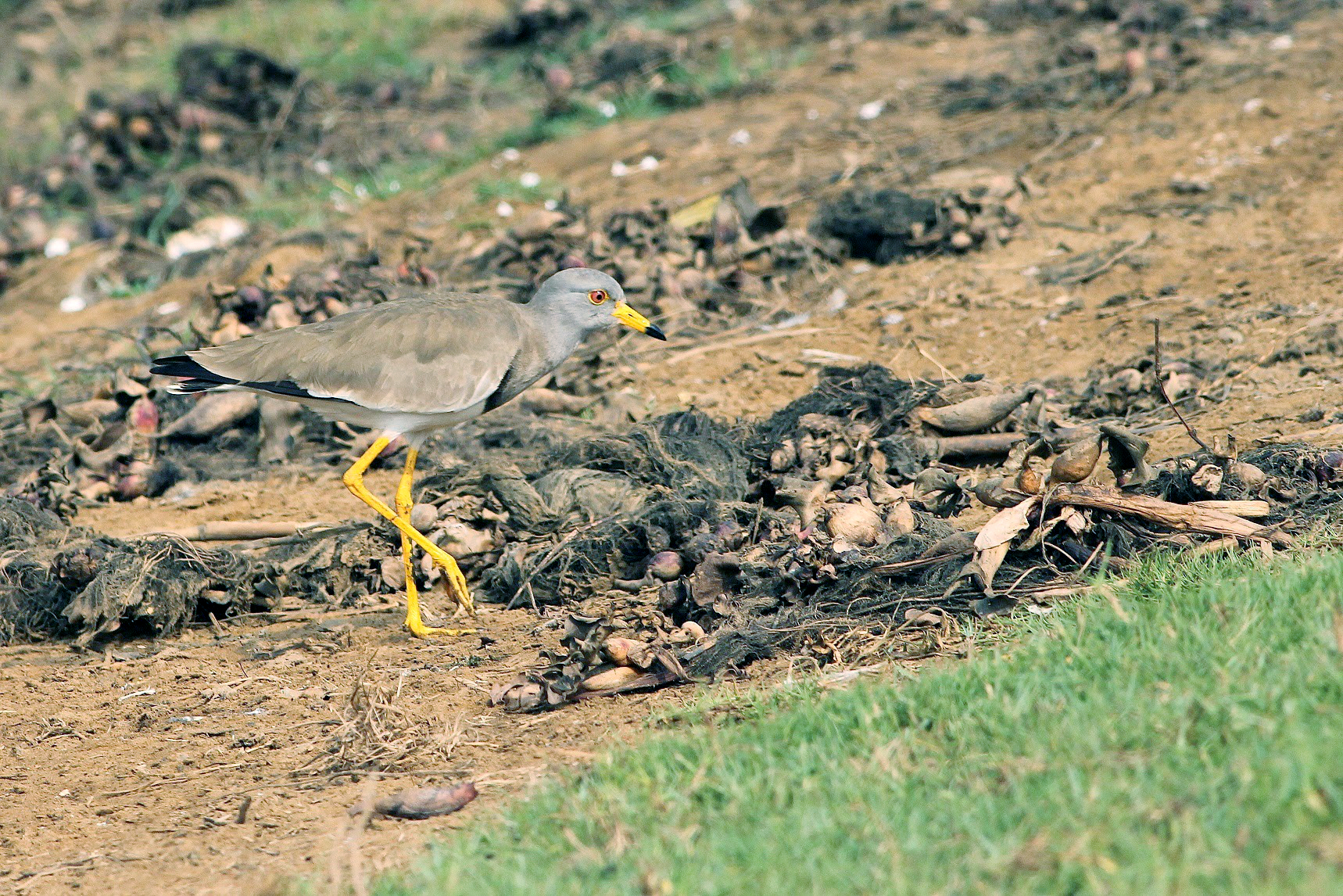
Grey-headed Lapwing

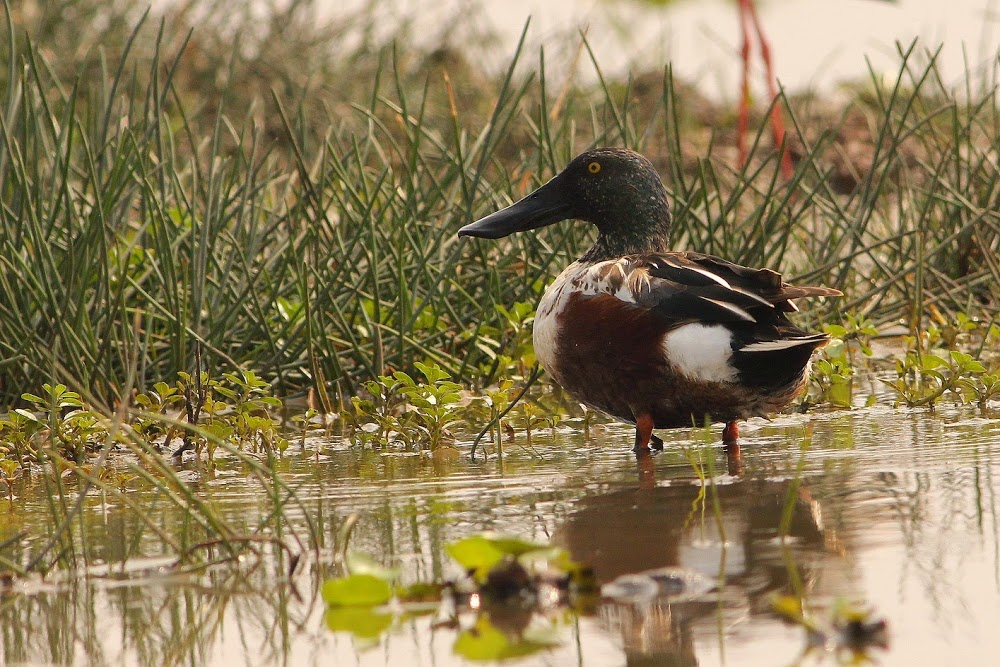
Northern Shoveler

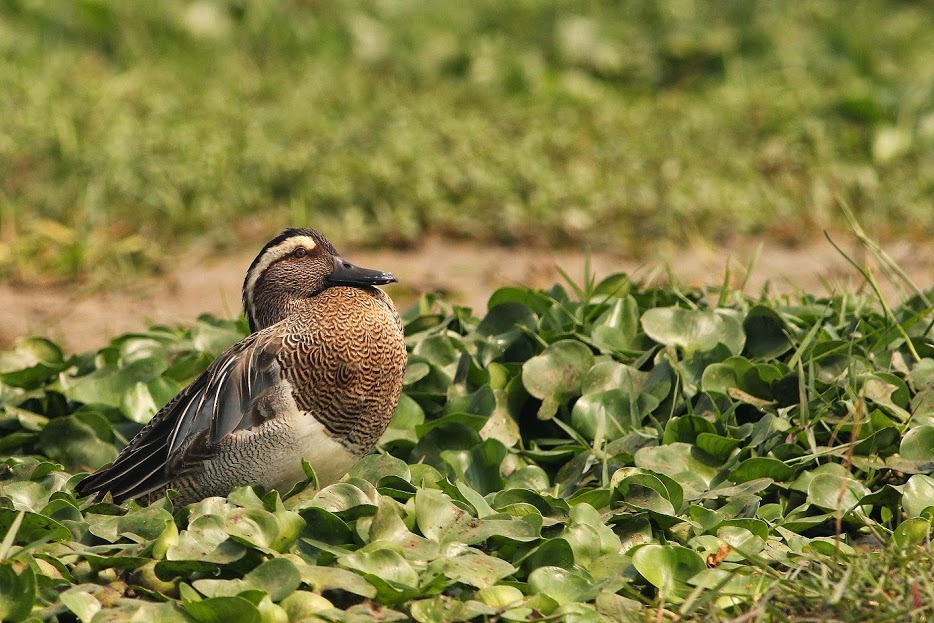
Garganey

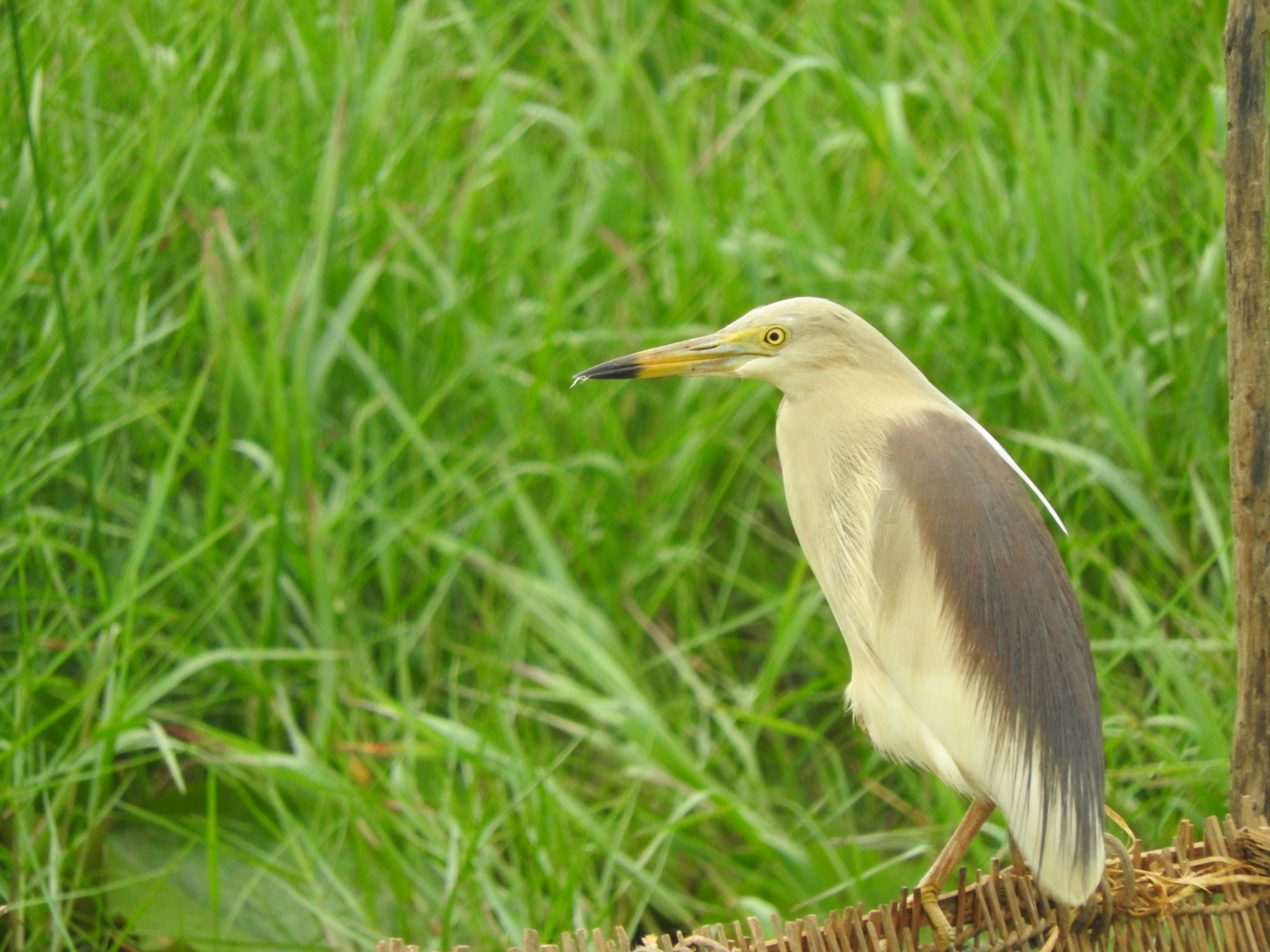
Indian Pond Heron in Mangalajodi, Odisha

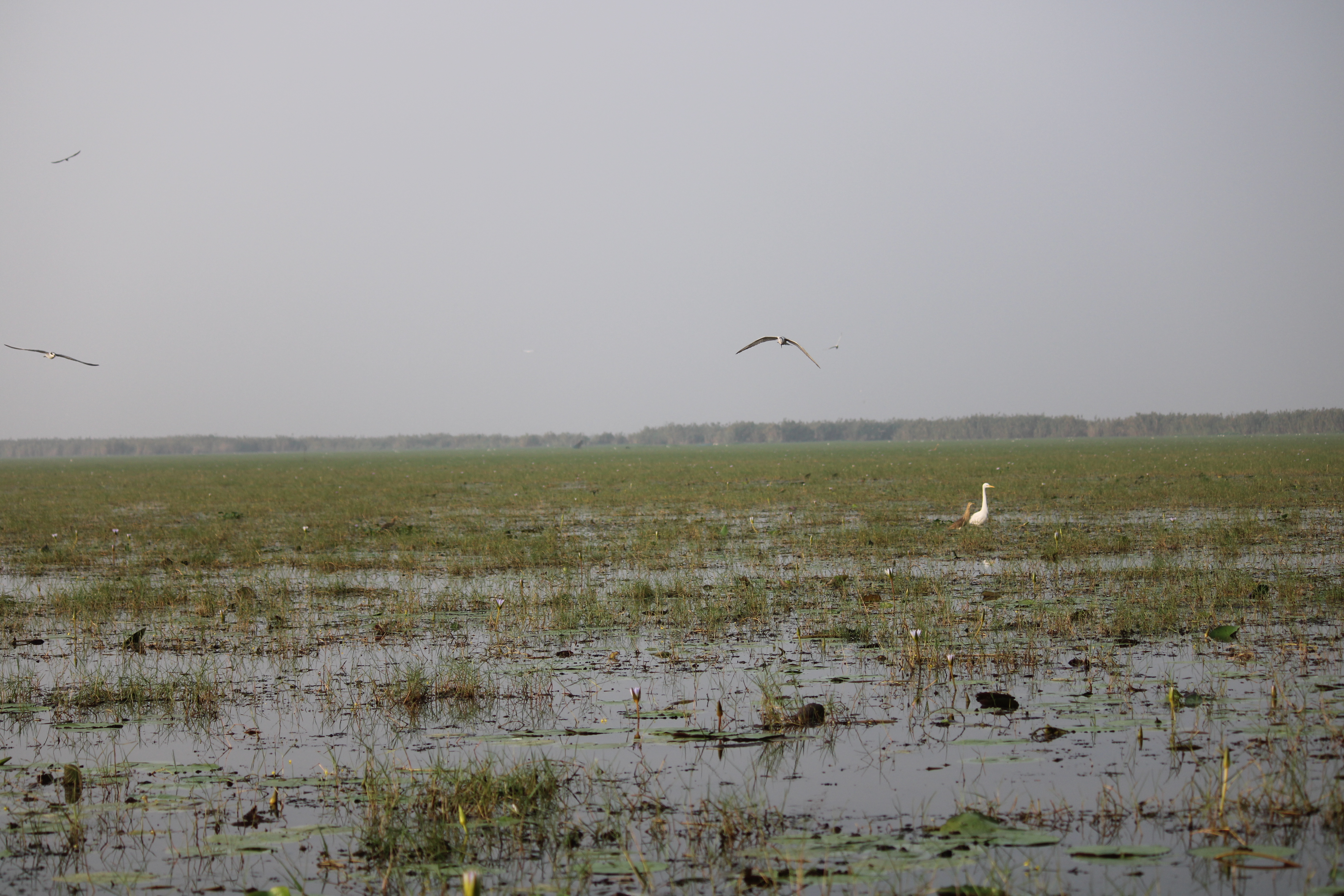
Mangalajodi Wetland

== Reference Links ==
Publications Mangalajodi Blog Mangalajodi Ecotourism Odisha Ecotourism
