= Rameswar, Odisha =

Village in Odisha

Rameswar ରାମେଶ୍ୱର
- Village
- Location in Odisha, India
- Coordinates: 19.98°N 85.45°E
- Country: India
- State: Odisha
- District: Khordha
- Tehsil: Tangi
- Time zone: UTC+5:30 (IST)
- PIN: 752019

Rameswar (also spelled Rameshwar) is a village located in the Khordha district of the Indian state of Odisha. It is situated along National Highway 16 (NH-16). The village has gained significant administrative and economic importance as the designated starting point of the upcoming Rameswar–Paradip Coastal Highway.

== Geography and Transport ==
Rameswar is located in the coastal region of Odisha within the Khordha district. It serves as a key transportation junction due to its location on the Kolkata-Chennai National Highway 16.

The village is the western terminal of the proposed 346-kilometer Rameswar–Paradip Coastal Highway. In November 2025, the Government of India's Public Private Partnership Appraisal Committee (PPPAC) approved an investment of ₹8,300 crore (US$1 billion) for the development of the stretch connecting Rameswar to Paradip. This infrastructure project aims to reduce travel time between the two locations significantly.

Additionally, the Cabinet of India has approved a six-lane Capital Region Ring Road project that connects Rameswar to Tangi, designed to decongest traffic around the cities of Bhubaneswar and Cuttack.

== Demographics ==
As per the 2011 Census of India, Rameswar falls under the administrative jurisdiction of the Khordha district. The local language spoken is Odia.
