= Pratapsasan =

- Census town
- Location in Odisha, India Pratapsasan (India)
- Coordinates: 20.2298°N 85.8611°E
- Country: India
- State: Odisha
- District: Khordha

Population (2001)
  - Total: 11,970

Languages
  - Official: Oriya
- Time zone: UTC+5:30 (IST)
- Vehicle registration: OD
- Website: odisha.gov.in

Pratapsasan is a census town in Khordha district in the Indian state of Odisha.

== Demographics ==
As of 2001 India census, Pratapsasan had a population of 11,970. Males constitute 52% of the population and females 48%. Pratapsasan has an average literacy rate of 66%, higher than the national average of 59.5%: male literacy is 74%, and female literacy is 58%. In Pratapsasan, 11% of the population is under 6 years of age.
