= Nirakarpur =

- Village
- Location in Odisha, India Nirakarpur (India)
- Coordinates: 19.991336°N 85.533284°E
- India: Nirakarpur
- State: Odisha
- District: Khordha

Government
  - Type: BJD
  - Body: India

Area Village in Odisha
  - Total: 51 km^{2} (20 sq mi)

Population (2011)
  - Total: 7,980

Other languages- English, Odia, Hindi
  - Official: Odia
- Time zone: UTC+5:30 (IST)
- Postal pin: 752019
- Vehicle registration: OD-02
- Website: odisha.gov.in

Nirakarpur is a village in Khordha district, in the state of Odisha, India. The name Nirakarpur meaning, the endless place. The place, which has no end. It is located 26 km (16 mi) south of District headquarter Khurda, 23 km (14 mi) from block headquarter Tangi and 52 km (32 mi) from state capital Bhubaneswar. Nirakarpur Police Station is situated on the spot. It has control over six Local Village (GPs) Administrative Areas.

== Notable features ==
The 'Kshetrabasi D.A.V. College' which was India's first rural based science college, was established in 1959. The college is now full-fledged science college along with commerce and humanities streams. Nirakarpur is a small township area comprising a vegetable market over more than one hundred years, shopping malls, showrooms, Bus & Taxi stands, Govt. Health & Wellness Center, Sub-Post Office, and a Railway station along with public and private sector establishments. Eight pairs of Express Trains halt at Nirakarpur[NKP] station. 'Chitrakut' Hill is situated in western part of this small township. There are caves and temples on the 'Chitrakut' hill, such as 'Hanumaan Mandir' at the heart and 'Bhairavi Mandir' at the foot of the Hill which is a picnic spot with natural scenery.

"Maa Narayani Baba Kapileswar Mandir" at Kapileswar (Baligaan) 2 km. approx. in southern part of Nirakarpur Township on Nirakarpur - Bhusandapur Road. 'Maa Narayani' temple was built during the Ninth century and the 'Viijayaa Rath Yaatraa' is being observed as a festival during the 'Navaraatra' festival since ninth century, which was established by the 'Gajapati Maharaja Kapilendra Dev' of Shreekshetra Puri, during his dynasty[Between 1400 - 1500]. There is a portrait statue of Goddess 'Mahishaa-Marddinee' [of Eighteen handed] at "Maa Narayani" temple which is one of the eight places they are found in India and the only place in Odisha state. The car festival[named as Vijayaa Ratha-Yaatraa] of "Baba Kapileswar Dev" during "Shukla Paksha Ashtami Tithi to Trayodashi Tithi' in the month of 'Chaitra' as per Odia Lunar calendar [March - April] is unique in its kind. One cannot believe without witnessing the uniqueness individually in the festival days. The "Ashokaashtami Vijayaa Ratha-Yaatraa"(Car Festival) of "Baba Kapileswar" visits to the with His Brother "Baba Graameswar" to His Brother-in-Law's Residence ['Shree-Shree Radhamohan Jew' temple] at adjacent village Dia. During the festival, there are cultural programs with various types of colourful fire-crackers [Bhuin-Champaa, Chakra, Akashdeepa, Gachha etc.; Bhuin-Champaa is the famous one amongst all] are fired on the sky during second half of last night. Here the Chariot pulls during mid-night hours which is unique.

The Mandakini River, locally called the Malaguni, flows along the northern side of the area. A dam on this river at Rameswar [2 miles approx.] which is a picnic spot with natural beauty, and an Way-side Amenity Center[restaurant and lodging](operated by OTDC) namely 'Neelambu' for motorists at Rameswar [5 km] on NH-16 which is situated on the foot of a hill on the bank of this river, and, staying at the resort has unique experience of sun-set and the nature. Beside these sites, another picnic spots are 'Totaa Bhagavati' [2 miles approx.] and,'Maa Ugratara Mandir' at Mulijhargarh is beautiful picnic spot with natural scenery which is 11 kilometre via Railway station - Kashipur-Mormorsingh-Haripur road. A temple of Lord Shiva is situated on the New Jagannath Sadak [Patta-Joshipur village, 6(six) kilometre distance towards Puri] which is similar to the Temple situated at Humma village on the bank of 'Mahanadi' river in Sambalpur district. [These temples are called 'Bakra Mandir']. 'Shaanti Aananda Aashram' Karamalaa Matha(Shaanti-Dhaam) the holy place of 'Santha Abhiraam Paramahansa' is about 20(twenty)kms by road from Nirakarpur.

== Transportation ==
NH 16 is 5 km (3.1 mi) from the village. The state capital [Bhubaneswar] is well connected with Nirakarpur by road(52 km) and rail(45 km). The railway station is 1 km (0.62 mi) from the Bus stand on the New Jagannath Sadak. By road, the state capital Bhubaneswar can be reached in 90(ninety)minutes. Nirakarpur Railway Station is a railway station on the East Coast Railway network in the state of Odisha. It serves Nirakarpur area. Its code is NKP. It has four platforms. Passenger, MEMU, Eight pairs of Express trains halt at Nirakarpur railway station, and, connected with Nua(New) Jaganatha Sadak from Saranakul of Nayagarh district [through Rameswar Junction and Jankia on NH16] to ShreeJagannath Dham Puri[Shreekshetra]. Bus services to Bhubaneswar, Khordha, Puri, Sarankul, Odagaon, Maninageswari Temple Ranpur, Brahmapur, Tarataini, Singhashini, Hinjilikatu are available. Other villages connected to this small township (Nirakarpur) along with other forty-five surrounding villages, depend on the Nirakarpur Railway Station and Bus stand for their daily transport needs.
