= Maa Ugra Tara =

Coordinates: 19.958432°N 85.468350°E

- Ugratara devi worshipped by Angiras and Vashista Rishi

Religion
- Affiliation: Hinduism
- District: khordha
- Deity: Goddess Ugratara

Location
- Location: Mulajharigarh village, Bhusandapur 65 kilometers from State capital Bhubaneswar
- State: Orissa
- Country: India

The Goddess Ugratara is the tutelary deity of Eastern Ganga dynasty kings of erstwhile Kalinga dynasty. Her ancient temple lies at Mulajharigarh village, Bhusandapur 65 kilometers from State capital Bhubaneswar, Orissa, India. The icon of Mother Tara is three-eyed and Chaturbhuja, holding potent weapons as sword, dagger, blue lotus and a drinking cup in her hands. She stands over a corpse on burning flames of funeral pyre. Serpent anklets and a serpent on crown are visible which clearly dates back to the time of the 11th-century Tantrik text Sadhanamala Tantra. When later kings of Gajapati dynasty revered goddess Kali or Shyamakaali she had less importance and her worship received less attention. But many people belonging to Vasishtha Gotra revere her as Ishta devi. She is one among ten Mahavidya in Hindu Tantrik theology. She is very popular as Ugratara due to her fierce aspect, but benevolent to the adorers as Ekajata/Neela-Saraswati. Nearby railway station is Bhushandapur in Khordha district which is accessible from Bhubaneswar and Balugaon by local passenger trains. The main festivals here are Chaitra parba, Raja Parba, Sharadiya Durga Puja. She is worshipped in tantrik way and offered all tantrik fivefold paraphrenalias.

== Notes ==
the equating relation between the buddhist and Tantric goddess Tara

- seek here the blessings of maa Ugra Tara
- Tara Worship in Bhusandapur
