= Jatani =

- Town
- Location in Odisha, India Jatani (India)
- Coordinates: 20.17°N 85.7°E
- Country: India
- State: Odisha
- District: Khordha
- Elevation: 36 m (118 ft)

Population (2011)
  - Total: 63,697

Languages
  - Official: Odia
- Time zone: UTC+5:30 (IST)
- PIN: 752050
- Telephone code: 0674
- Vehicle registration: OD-02
- Website: odisha.gov.in

Jatani, also spelled as Jatni, is a town in the Indian state of Odisha. It is also a municipality in Khordha district in Odisha.

Jatani is famous for its celebration of the festival of Ganesh Chaturthi.

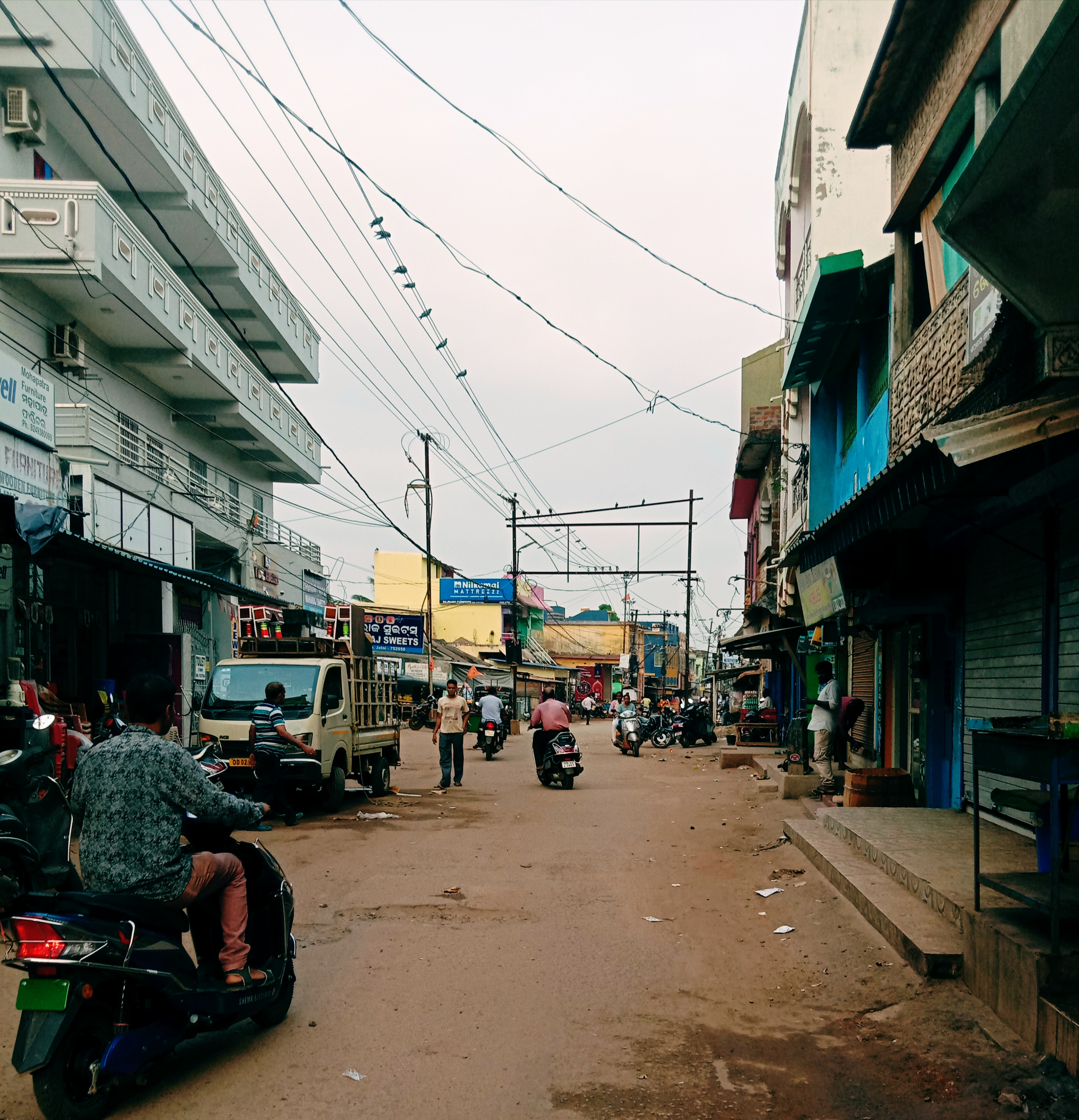
Raja Bazar, Jatani

== Geography ==
Jatani is located at 20.09°N 85.42°E. It has an average elevation of 36 metres (118 feet).

== Demographics ==
As of 2011 India census, Jatani had a population of 63,697. Males constitute 52% of the population and females 48%. Jatani has an average literacy rate of 78%, higher than the national average of 59.5%: male literacy is 83%, and female literacy is 72%. In Jatani, 11% of the population is under 6 years of age.

== Education ==
=== Premier Public Higher Education Institutes ===
- National Institute of Science Education and Research (NISER)
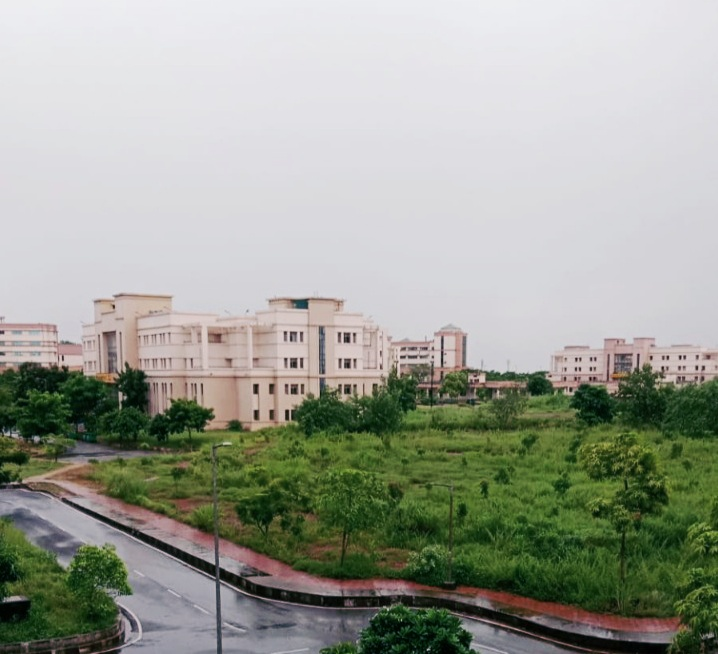
  NISER, Jatani
- Indian Institute of Technology, Bhubaneswar

=== Private Engineering Colleges ===
- Centurion University of Technology & Management
- Konark Institute of Science and Technology
- Orissa Engineering College (OEC)

== Politics ==
Current MLA from Jatani Assembly Constituency is Sura Routray of INC from May 2019, successor to Bhagirathi Badajena, who won the seat in State elections of 2014. Earlier Sarat Paikary won in 1990 as JD candidate and 2004 as Biju Janta Dal candidate. Winner of this seat in 2000, 1995, 1985, 1980 and 1977 was Suresh Kumar Routray, who represented INC in 2000, 1995 and 1985, represented INC(I) in 1980 and JNP in 1977.

Jatani is part of Bhubaneswar (Lok Sabha constituency).
