= Jankia =

Village in Odisha

Coordinates: 20°02′N 85°31′E

Jankia is a village in Khordha Tehsil in Khordha district of Odisha state, India. It is 18 km from district headquarters Khordha and 50 km from state capital Bhubaneswar on the Howrah–Chennai National Highway-No-16. It is around 55 km from Puri on the new Jagannath road. Jankia's postal code is 752020 and postal head office is Jankia. Odia is the local language.

Nearby villages to Jankia are: Jankia-Nuagaon (2 km), Ramabili (2 km), Olasingh (4 km), Chhannagiri (4 km), Rameswar (4 km), Kalarajhar (7 km), and Gopinathpur (9 km). Jankia is surrounded by Ranapur Tehsil to the west, Tangi Tehsil to the south, Begunia Tehsil to the north, Khordha Tehsil to the north. Khordha, Tangi, Jatani, Bhubaneswar, and Puri are the nearby cities to Jankia.

== Transport ==
It is well connected with Bhubaneswar, Khordha, Puri, Berhampur etc. Golabai railway station and Nirakarpur railway station are the very nearby railway stations to Jankia. However, Bhubaneswar railway station is a major railway station 48 km near to Jankia.
