= Tangi, Odisha =

Tangi
- Town
- Location in Odisha, India Tangi (India)
- Coordinates: 19°55′22.72″N 85°23′37.30″E
- Country: India
- State: Odisha
- District: Khordha

Government
  - Type: Nagar Panchayat
  - Body: Tangi NAC

Population (2011)
  - Total: 24,642

Languages
  - Official: Odia
- Time zone: UTC+5:30 (IST)
- Postal pin: 752023
- Vehicle registration: OD-02
- Website: odisha.gov.in

Tangi is a town and a Notified Area Council in district of Khordha in the eastern Indian state of Odisha. It is 65 km from the state capital Bhubaneswar and 38 km from the district headquarter Khordha.

== Population ==
As of the 2011 census, Tangi sub-district had 31410 households and 152037 inhabitants.
