= Khordha district =

Khordha district Khurda district
- District of Odisha
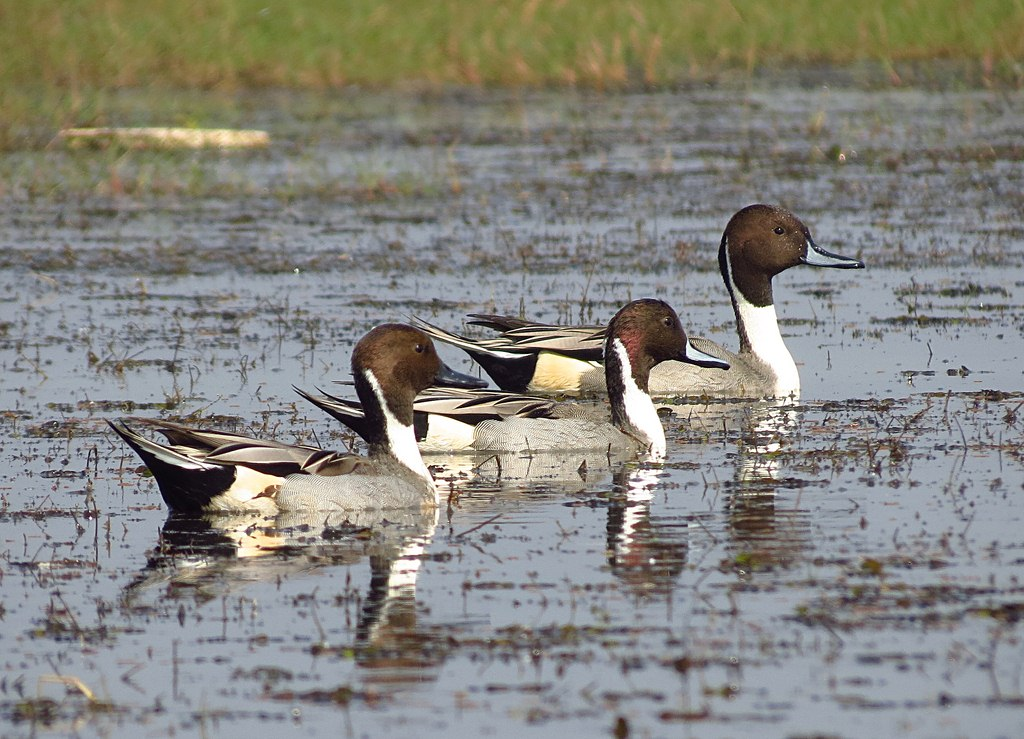
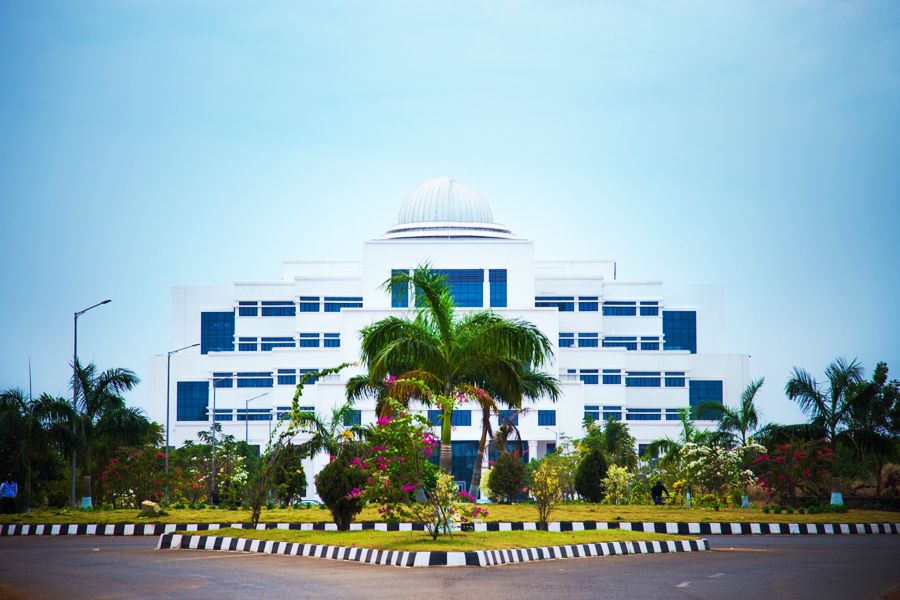
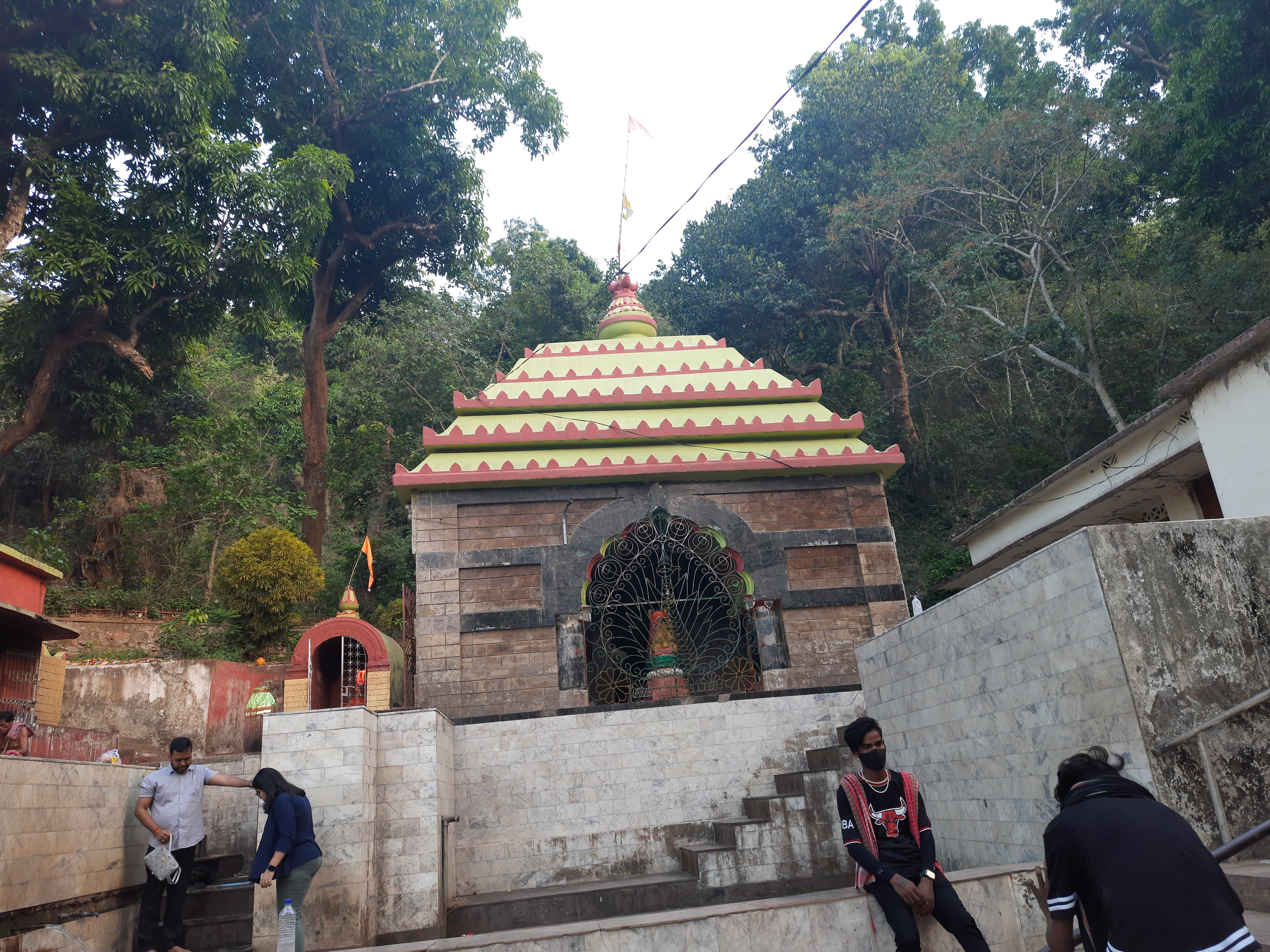
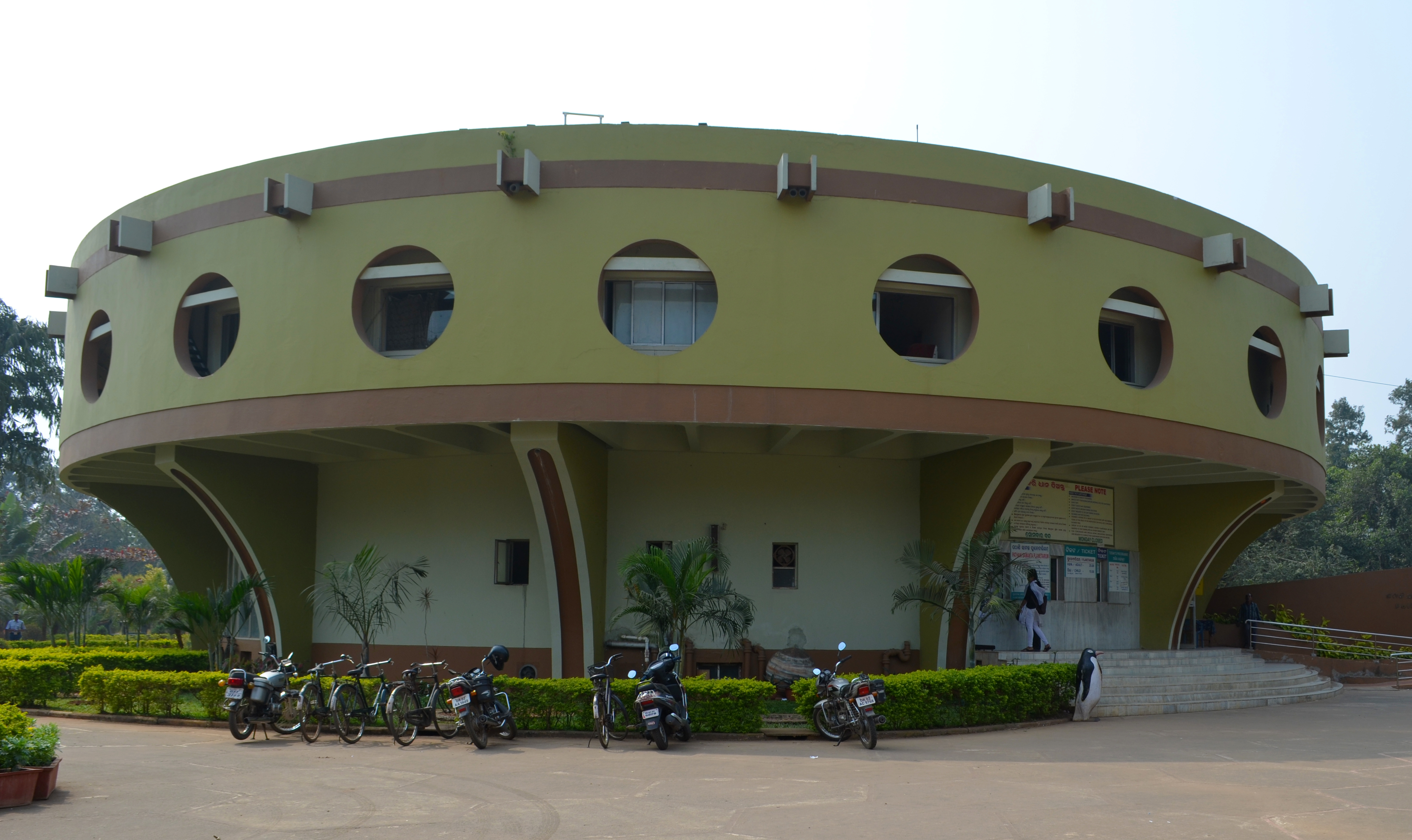
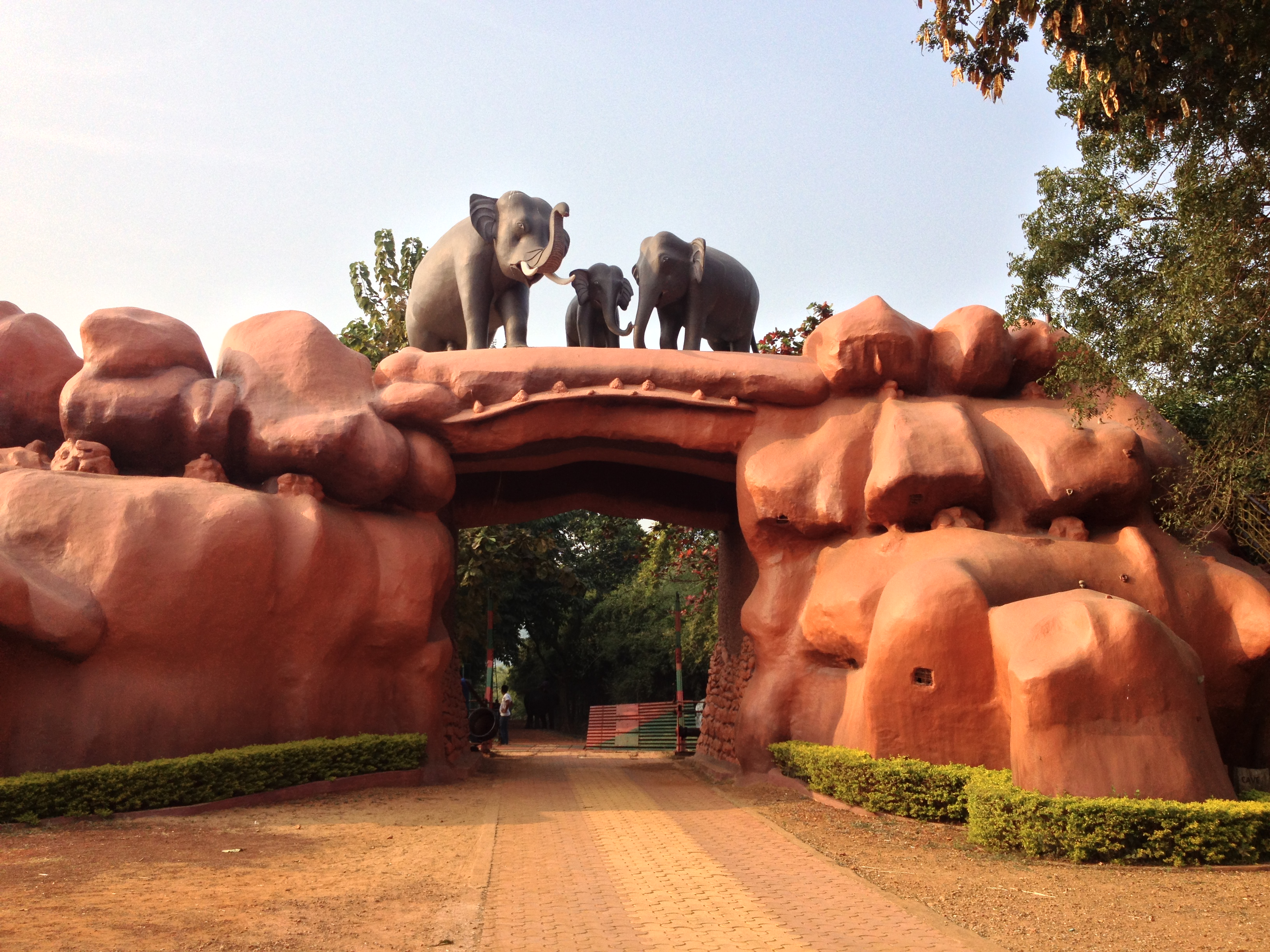
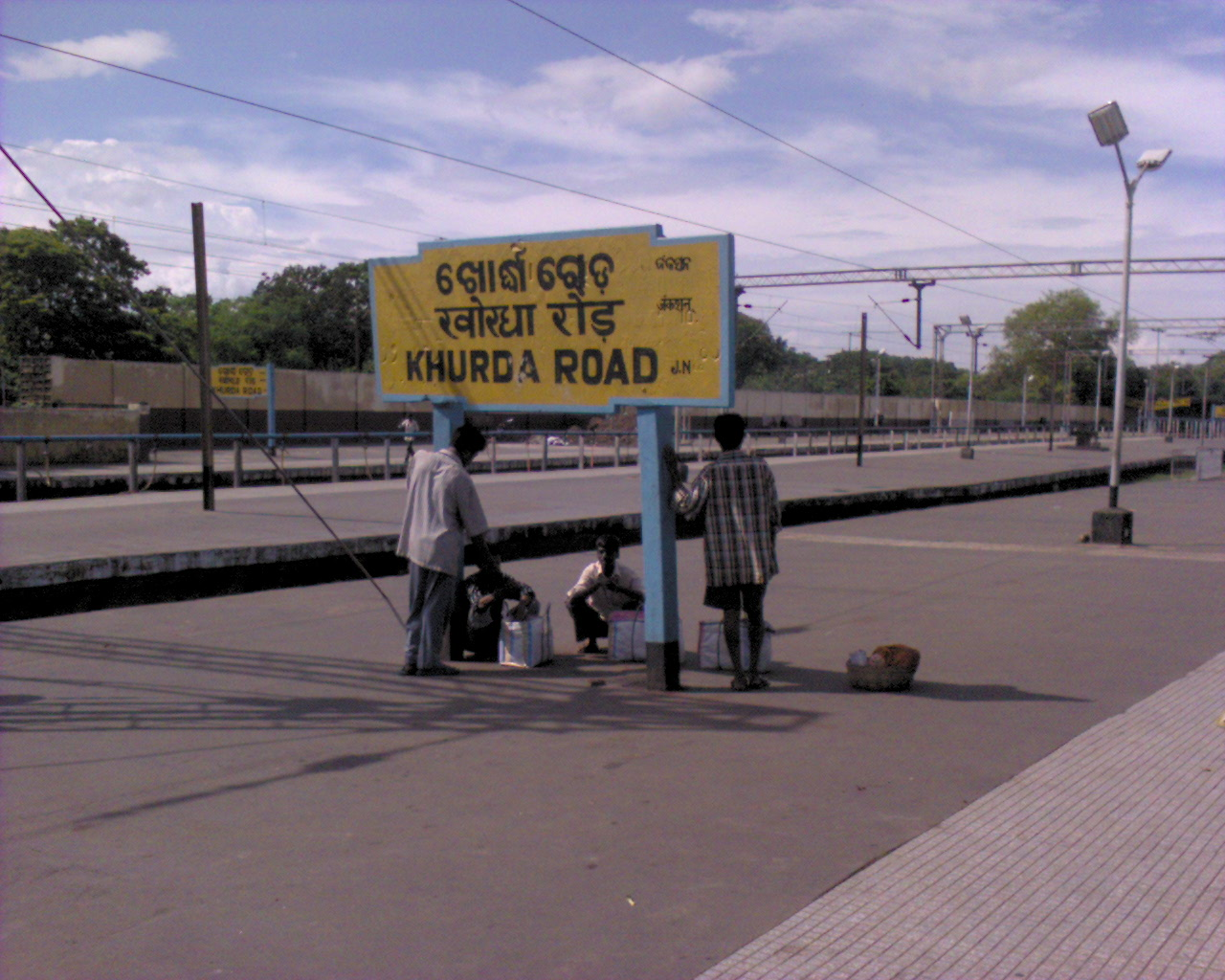
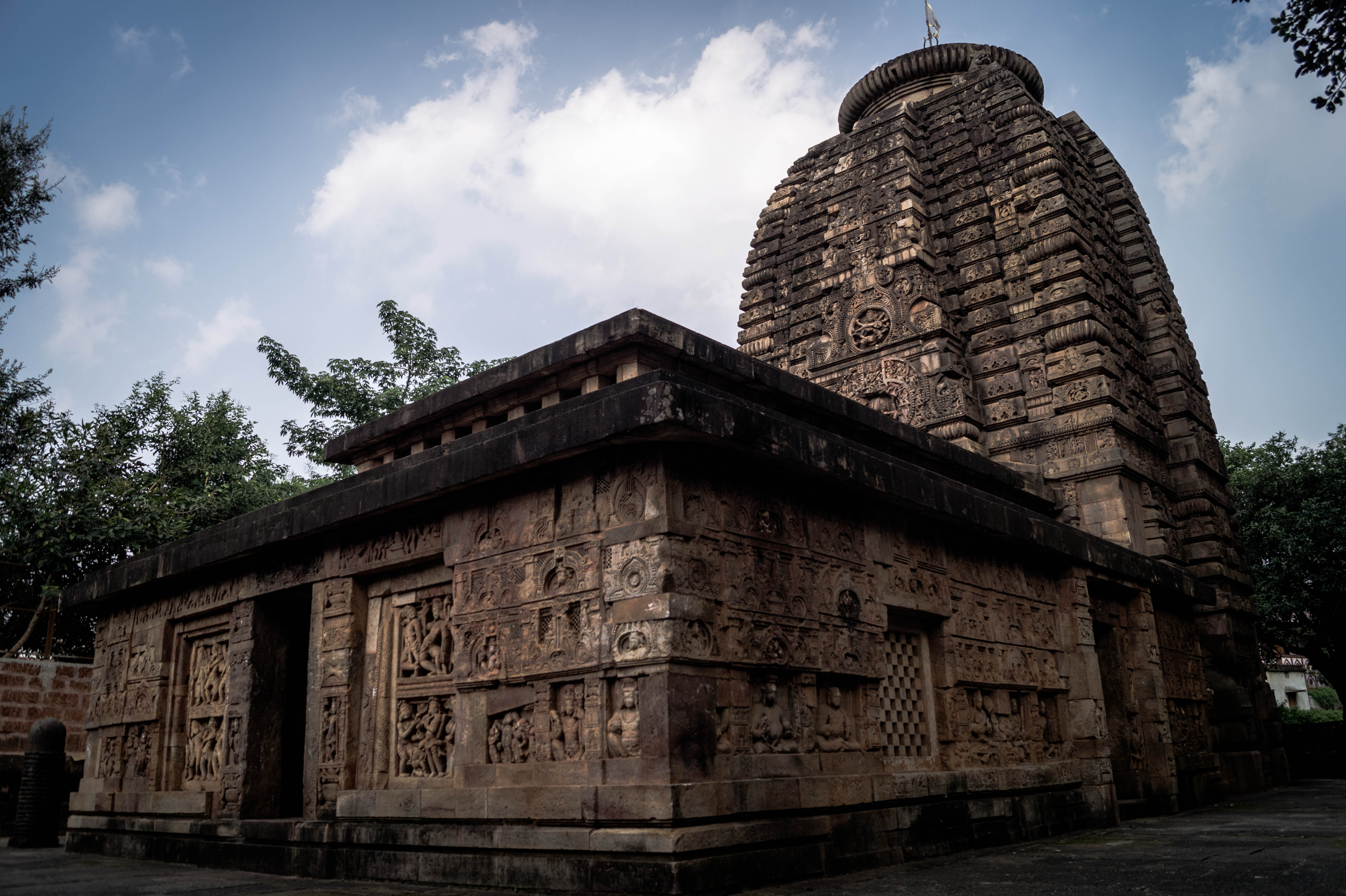
- 'From Zigzag from the top': Mangalajodi, IIT Bhubaneswar, Maa Barunei Temple, Pathani Samanta Planetarium, Chandaka Elephant Sanctuary, Khurda Road Junction railway station, Parsurameswara Temple
- Nickname: Paikagada
- Interactive map of Khordha district
- Coordinates: 20.166°N 85.666°E
- Country: India
- State: Odisha
- CD Blocks and Tahasils: 10
- Established: April 1, 1993; 33 years ago
- Headquarters: Khordha

Government
  - Collector & District Magistrate: Shri Amrit Ruturaj, IAS
  - Superintendent of Police: Ms. Sagarika Nath, IPS

Area
  - Total: 2,813 km^{2} (1,086 sq mi)
  - Rank: 24
- Elevation: 568 m (1,864 ft)

Population (2025 (projection))
  - Total: 2,704,000
  - Rank: 5
  - Density: 961.3/km^{2} (2,490/sq mi)

Languages
  - Official: Odia, English
- Time zone: UTC+5:30 (IST)
- PIN: 751 xxx, 752 xxx
- Telephone code: 674, 6755, 6756
- Vehicle registration: OD-02/OD-33, OD-33K
- Nearest city: Bhubaneswar
- Sex ratio: 1.108 ♂/♀
- Literacy: 92.8%
- Lok Sabha constituency: 2
- Vidhan Sabha constituency: 6
- Climate: Aw (Köppen)
- Precipitation: 1,443 millimetres (56.8 in)
- Avg. summer temperature: 41.4 °C (106.5 °F)
- Avg. winter temperature: 9.5 °C (49.1 °F)
- Website: www.khordha.nic.in

Khordha district is an administrative district of the state of Odisha, India. It was formed on April 1, 1993, by the division of former Puri District into Puri, Khordha and Nayagarh districts. In the year 2000 the district name was changed to Khordha. The district headquarters is Khordha Town. The capital city of Bhubaneswar is located in this district. Khordha is the most urbanized of all the districts of Odisha.

Khordha Road, the railway station that serves the town, is also the divisional headquarters of the East Coast Railway of the Indian Railways, and contains its own division. Khordha is known for its brass utensils, cottage industries, railway coach manufacturing and cable manufacturing unit and consumer food manufacturing unit of various MNCs like Coca-Cola, Pepsi, Unilever, ITC etc.

== History ==
It was the capital of Odisha from 1568 to 1803. It is also known for its fort, often described as the "last independent fort". The commander who kept it free from British East India Company was Bakshi Jagabandhu, popularly called 'Paika Bakshi'.

The Savaras tribal group, who are still to be found in the district in some pockets, once heavily populated the area. Khurda came into prominence when the first Rajas of the Khordha dynasty, Ramachandra Deva, made it the capital of his kingdom during the latter part of the 16th century. Khurda suffered repeated onslaughts from Muslim and Maratha cavalry but its royal house retained independence till 1804, when the British East India Company dispossessed Raja of his territory following the Second Anglo-Maratha War.

British government took Odisha under its rule in 1803 but could only include Khurda in 1827. The Paikas of Khurda are known for protesting against the British rule in Odisha.

== Geography ==
It is also the district headquarters of Khurda district located at 20.11° N 85.40° E. The area of the district is 2,813 km^{2} (1,086 sq mi). The district is bordered by Cuttack district to the north and east, Puri district to the south, Ganjam district to the west, and Nayagarh district to the northwest. The Daya and Kuakhai Rivers flow through Khurda. The forested area is 618.67 km^{2} (238.87 sq mi). The district is mainly flat coastal plain, with some hill ranges in the west. It borders the Chilika Lake.

=== Climate ===
Bhubaneswar

Climate chart (precipitation, max. and min. temperature)
J	F	M	A	M	J	J	A	S	O	N	D
12 28 16	24 32 19	24 35 22	22 37 25	56 38 27	196 35 26	325 32 25	330 31 25	288 32 25	208 31 23	37 30 19	28 28 15
- █ Average max. and min. temperatures in °C
- █ Precipitation totals in mm
- Source: IMD
Imperial conversion
J	F	M	A	M	J	J	A	S	O	N	D
0.5 83 60	1 89 65	1 95 72	0.9 99 77	2.2 100 80	7.7 96 79	13 89 77	13 89 77	11 89 77	8.2 89 73	1.5 86 66	1.1 82 60
- █ Average max. and min. temperatures in °F
- █ Precipitation totals in inches

- Temperature: 41.4 (max), 9.5 (min)
- Rainfall: 1443 mm (avg)

== Economy ==
It is renowned for its brass utensils cottage industries, cable factory, spinning mills, watch repairing factory, railway coach repairing factory, oil industries, Coca-Cola bottling plant and small metal industries, or sms group, Iocl gas bottling plant.

== Divisions ==
- Parliamentary constituencies: 2
- Assembly constituencies: 6
- Subdivisions: 2
- Villages: 1,561
- Blocks: 10
- Grama panchayat: 168
- Tehsils: 08
- Towns: 6
  - Municipality: 2 (Khordha, Jatni)
  - Municipal Corporation: 1 (Bhubaneshwar)
  - N.A.C: 3 (Tangi, Balugaon, Banpur )

=== Blocks ===
1. Balianta
2. Balipatna
3. Banapur
4. Begunia
5. Bhubaneswar
6. Bolagarh
7. Chilika
8. Jatni
9. Khordha
10. Tangi

=== Subdivisions ===
1. Bhubaneswar: consists of 4 blocks, viz. Balianta, Balipatana, Jatni, Bhubaneswar.
2. Khurda: consists of 6 blocks, viz. Tangi, Khorda sadara, Banapur, Begunia, Bolgarh and Chilika.

== Demographics ==
Historical population
Year	Pop.	±%
1901	470,409	—
1911	479,645	+2.0%
1921	431,482	−10.0%
1931	478,128	+10.8%
1941	516,719	+8.1%
1951	557,718	+7.9%
1961	658,073	+18.0%
1971	858,554	+30.5%
1981	1,132,182	+31.9%
1991	1,502,014	+32.7%
2001	1,877,395	+25.0%
2011	2,251,673	+19.9%
Source: Census of India

Religions in Khordha district (2011)
Religion	Percent
Hinduism	95.38%
Islam	3.73%
Christianity	0.56%
Other or not stated	0.33%

Block	Hindu	Muslim	Other
Bhubaneswar	842912	29,123	13,328
Khorda	127,013	11,618	1,347
Khorda Sadar	59,569	2,394	77
Lingaraj	1	188	0
Bolagad	86,954	3,704	136
Begunia	94,397	2,641	128
Chandaka	54,195	788	485
Nandankanan	17,622	14	34
Mancheswar	4,895	210	12
Balianta	89,674	1,929	125
Balipatna	121,309	10,902	585
Airfield (Kapila Prasad)	13,121	84	240
Uttara	12,908	11	22
Khandagiri	2,571	0	1
Tamando	16,061	48	297
Jatani	114,118	10,603	1,684
Jankia	82,922	1,475	211
Nirakarpur	36,252	1,670	58
Tangi	148,209	3,663	20,165
Balugaon	111,716	1,762	280
Banapur	111,213	1,233	766

According to the 2011 census Khordha district has a population of 2,251,673, roughly equal to the nation of Latvia or the US state of New Mexico. This gives it a ranking of 201st in India (out of a total of 640). The district has a population density of 799 inhabitants per square kilometre (2,070/sq mi). Its population growth rate over the decade 2001-2011 was 19.65%. Khordha has a sex ratio of 925 females for every 1000 males, and a literacy rate of 87.51%. 48.16% of the population lives in urban areas. Scheduled Castes and Scheduled Tribes make up 13.21% and 5.11% of the population respectively.

Languages of Khordha district (2011)
1. Odia (92.1%)
2. Urdu (1.98%)
3. Telugu (1.69%)
4. Hindi (1.55%)
5. Bengali (1.38%)
6. Others (1.27%)

At the time of the 2011 Census of India, 92.13% of the population in the district spoke Odia, 1.98% Urdu, 1.69% Telugu, 1.55% Hindi, 1.38% Bengali and 0.43% Santali as their first language.

== Politics ==
=== Vidhan sabha constituencies ===
The following are the eight Vidhan sabha constituencies of Khordha district and their elected members.

=== Lok Sabha constituencies ===
During the 1952 general election, Pandit Lingraj Mishra was elected from the Khurda (Lok Sabha constituency). From 1957 onwards, members were elected from Bhubaneswar (Lok Sabha constituency).
