= Champagarh =

Village in Odisha, India

Champagarh ଚମ୍ପାଗଡ଼
- Village
- Location in Odisha, India
- Coordinates: 19.9716°N 85.4350°E
- State: Odisha
- District: Nayagarh district
- Tehsil: Ranapur
- Time zone: UTC+5:30 (IST)
- PIN: 752024
- Lok Sabha constituency: Puri
- Vidhan Sabha constituency: Ranpur

Champagarh, is a village in the Ranapur tehsil of Nayagarh district in the Indian state of Odisha. It serves as a local administrative unit with a Branch Post Office (B.O.) assigned the PIN code 752024.

== Geography ==
Champagarh is located in the coastal region of Odisha, falling under the administrative jurisdiction of the Nayagarh district. It is situated near the town of Chandapur. The village operates under the Puri postal division.

== Administration ==
The village acts as a Branch Post Office (B.O.) which reports to the Chandapur Sub-Office (S.O.). It falls under the Ranpur Assembly constituency.

== See also ==
- Raj-Ranpur
- Chandpur, Odisha
- Mayurjhalia
- Katakasahar
