= Sabyasachi Panda =

Indian Maoist leader and former politician (born 1958)

- Born: 19 July 1968 (age 58); Mayurjhalia, Raj-Ranpur, Nayagarh, Odisha, India
- Other name: Babu Panda
- Occupations: Politician, former Maoist leader
- Organization: Ranpur Assembly constituency
- Known for: Terrorist and Naxalite-Maoist
- Criminal charge: 50
- Criminal penalty: In custody Of Odisha
- Criminal status: Serving life sentence (convicted 2019)
- Spouse: Subhashree Panda
- Parent: Ramesh Chandra Panda (father)

Sabyasachi Panda (also known by his alias Babu Panda) is an Indian former Naxalite-Maoist leader and the founder of the Odisha Maowadi Party (OMP) and former Politician for the Ranpur Assembly constituency in the Odisha Legislative Assembly from Mayurjhalia, Ranpur, in Nayagarh district state of Odisha. He was formerly a top commander of the Communist Party of India (Maoist) in the state of Odisha. He is currently serving a life sentence following his conviction in 2019 for waging war against the state, although he has been acquitted in several other cases due to lack of evidence. He was wanted by the state police of several states in India for his involvement in criminal activities He came into international news in 2012, for his alleged engineering of the kidnapping of two Italians nationals He is also alleged to have involved and wanted in more than 50 criminal cases, including the murder of Swami Laxamananda Saraswati and four of his aides in Kandhamal district in 2008 that had triggered communal violence in the region. He was expelled by the CPI(Maoist) and then he floated a new party called the Communist Party of India (Marxist–Leninist-Maoist). He was also wanted in the abduction case of two Italian tourists, who were released later in March 2012 On 18 July 2014 Odisha Police raided a Maoist hideout in Ganjam district on the basis of intelligence inputs and arrested Sabyasachi Panda from Berhampur 45-year-old Sabyasachi Panda carried a cash reward of Rs 5 lakh on his head.

Panda was captured on 18 July 2014 by Indian security forces in Ganjam District, Odisha.

== Early life and education ==
Sabyasachi Panda was born on 19 July 1972 in Mayurjhalia, Raj-Ranpur, Nayagarh district, Odisha in a Brahmin family. He came from a political family. His father, Ramesh Chandra Panda, was a three-time Member of the Legislative Assembly, for the Ranpur Assembly constituency, representing the Communist Party of India (Marxist). His mother’s name is Krishna Devi. His grandfather, Madan Sundar Panda, was a freedom fighter who played a role in the Ranpur Praja rebellion. Panda completed his early schooling in Odisha and went on to graduate in Mathematics from a government college, Samanta Chandra Sekhar (Autonomous) College, Puri, Odisha. He is married to Subhashree or Mili Panda from Nimapara, Odisha.

== Murder of Swami Laxmananda Saraswati and his followers ==
Panda has been implicated in the 2008 murder of Swami Lakshmanananda Saraswati and four of his followers in Kandhamal district. The eighty-four-year-old monk had dedicated his life to Ghar Vapsi and to the ancient Vedic and Aryan traditions of the Khond vanavasis and they revered him. The murder of Swami Lakshmananda Saraswati, combined with Christian Charity and upliftment efforts of the Panna Christian community, would trigger communal violence between the two groups. He was expelled by the CPI(Maoist) and then he floated a new party called the Communist Party of India (Marxist–Leninist-Maoist).

== Capture ==
On 18 July 2014 Odisha Police raided a Maoist hideout in Ganjam district on the basis of intelligence inputs and captured Panda in Berhampur, where he been hiding. The arrest was successfully carried out by the Odisha Police.
