= Ramesh Chandra Panda =

Member of Odisha Legislative Assembly (1935–2003)

Shri Ramesh Chandra Panda ଶ୍ରୀ
- ରମେଶ ଚନ୍ଦ୍ର ପଣ୍ଡା (ଓଡ଼ିଆ)
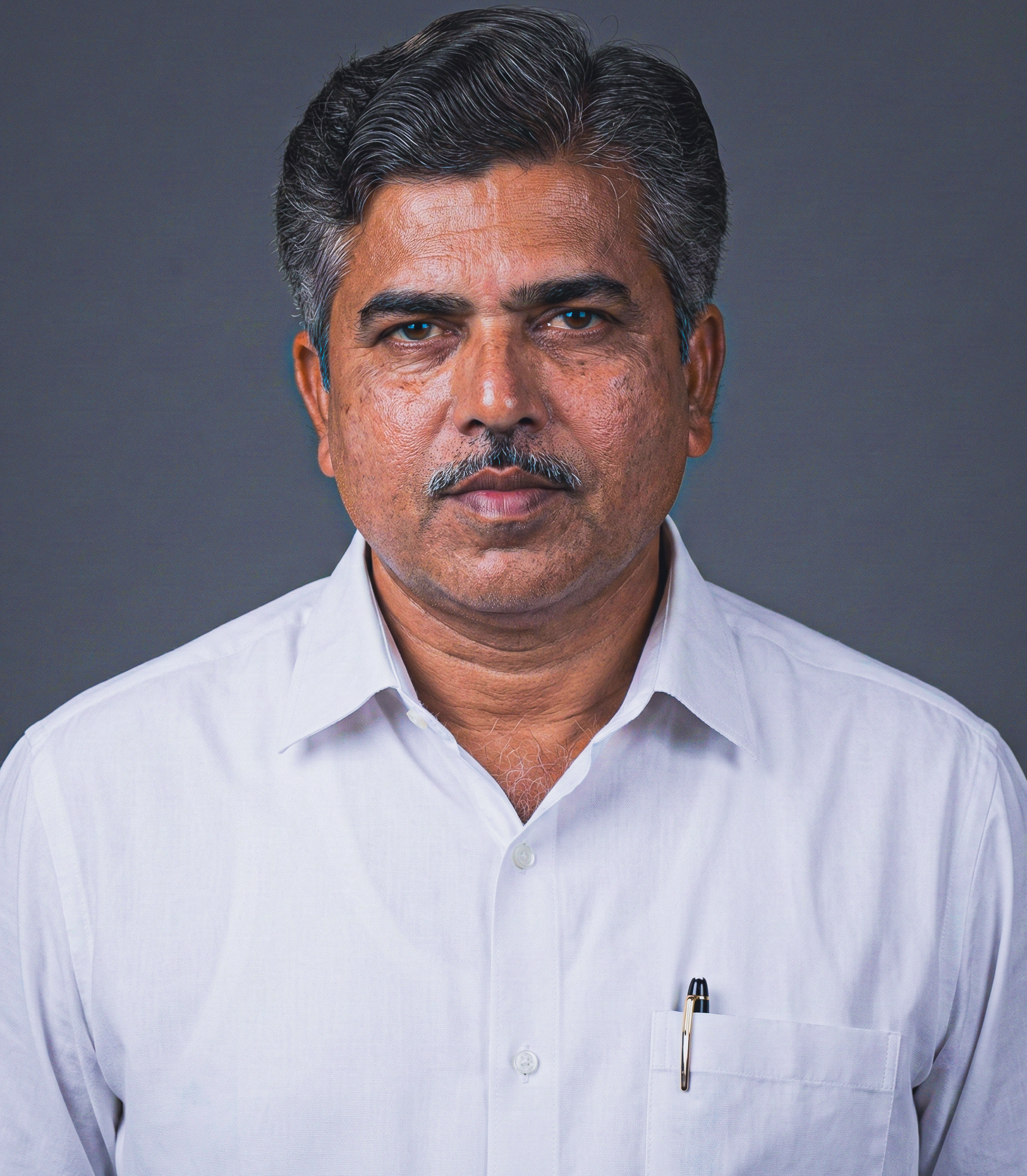
- Ramesh Chandra Panda in 1985

Member of the Odisha Legislative Assembly
- In office 1971–1974
- Preceded by: Brajendra Chandra Bir. Baj. Narendra Mohapatra Singh Deo
- Succeeded by: Ramakanta Mishra
- Constituency: Ranpur Assembly constituency

Ranpur Assembly constituency
- In office 1977–1980

Personal details
- Born: 24 November 1935 Mayurjhalia, Raj-Ranpur, Nayagarh, Odisha, India
- Died: 18 December 2003 (aged 68) Mayurjhalia, Raj-Ranpur, Nayagarh, Odisha, India
- Party: Indian National Congress (I),Biju Janata Dal
- Spouse: Krishna Kumari Panda (m. 1956–2003)
- Children: Sabyasachi Panda (Younger Son), Siddharth Panda (Elder Son)
- Parent: Madan Sundar Panda (father)
- Education: Ravenshaw College Cuttack
- Occupation: Politician, MLA, Social work Political Activist, Independent politician,

Ramesh Chandra Panda, also known as Ramesh Panda, (IPA: [ରମେଶ ଚନ୍ଦ୍ର ପଣ୍ଡା];24 November 1935 – 18 December 2003) was an Indian Social activist and a former Member of the Legislative Assembly (MLA) for the Ranpur Assembly constituency in the Odisha Legislative Assembly from Mayurjhalia village in tehsil of Ranpur, in Nayagarh district state of Odisha. He was a member of the Indian National Congress. He had been a member of the Communist Party of India. He served as a member of the Odisha Legislative Assembly for three terms and was elected to the 5th, 6th and 7th Odisha Legislative Assembly from Ranpur Assembly constituency in the 1971 Odisha Legislative Assembly election, 1974 Odisha Legislative Assembly election and 1977 Odisha Legislative Assembly election, 1980 Odisha Legislative Assembly election's respectively. He has credited with the establishment of Arjuna Rout Memorial College (A.R.M. College) in 1992, located in Mayurjhalia, in the college located area of Borabarjhar, tehsil of Ranpur in the Nayagarh district of Odisha, following his death in 2003, his family and supporters established a charitable foundation in his name, a statue of Ramesh Panda was erected on the campus of Arjuna Rout Memorial College to commemorate his role as the institution's founder and his lifelong service to the Ranpur region.

== Early life ==
Ramesh Chandra Panda, was born on November 24, 1935, in Mayurjhalia, Raj-Ranpur, Nayagarh, Odisha. His parents married in 1931. His father's name is Madan Sundar Panda, was a freedom fighter who participated in the Ranpur Praja rebellion. and there is no mention of the mother's name in official files. Ramesh Panda married Krishna Kumari Panda on September 11, 1956. They had three daughters and two sons. His son Sabyasachi Panda, also known as Babu Panda, is a politician and a Naxalite-Maoist leader. Sabyasachi was born on July 19, 1972, in the same village as his father. He has been involved in violent revolutionary activities and was arrested once in 2014. His daughter-in-law, Subhashree Panda, also known as Mili Panda, is also a politician and lawyer has gained recognition as Sabyasachi Panda's spouse.

=== Education and political life ===
Ramesh Chandra Panda started his political career when he was a student in Ravenshaw College Cuttack. He joined the Student's Federation, a front of the undivided Communist Party of India (CPI) and later became a fulltime CPI activist. In 1964 after the split in the CPI, Ramesh joined the Communist Party of India (Marxist) (CPI(M)). He operated out of his base in Ranpur block in the undivided Puri district and was elected the chairman of Ranpur block in 1967. He was elected to the Odisha assembly from Ranpur Assembly Constituency the same year. Panda was a three-time representative of Ranpur Assembly constituency, initially elected on a CPI(M) ticket. He later joined the Biju Janata Dal (BJD) before his passing.

=== Younger daughter-in-law ===
Subhashree Panda, also known as Mili Panda, is the daughter-in-law of Ramesh Chandra, linked through her marriage to Sabyasachi Panda. This family connection places both individuals in the public eye, particularly given the controversial nature of Sabyasachi Panda's Maoist leadership, which has shaped Mili's political challenges and Ramesh's legacy.

=== Elder sons ===
Sidhharth Panda, also commonly known by his alias Tukuna Panda, is also an Indian politician. He graduated Mayurjhalia Nodal High School and studied in Prashanth Autonomous College Khordha. He studied Law and English Literature at Utkal University.

=== Madan Sundar Panda's father ===
Madan Sundar Panda was a freedom fighter who played a role in the Ranpur Praja rebellion, was born on August 7, 1873 in a village Mayurjhalia in the Ranpur region of Nayagarh district, Odisha. He is best remembered for his active role in the historic Ranpur Praja rebellion, a significant local uprising against princely rule during the British Raj, following the Ranpur Praja Rebellion, Madan Sundar Panda was arrested by the British authorities and tried for his role in the uprising, including his involvement in the death of a top British official. He was convicted and sentenced to a lengthy term of imprisonment — serving a full 12 years behind bars for his leadership in the rebellion.

== Death ==
Ramesh Chandra Panda died on December 18, 2003, at the age of 68, in his native village of Mayurjhalia, Raj-Ranpur, Nayagarh, Odisha. At the time of his before death his was a politician from Odisha, India, and served as a Member of the Legislative Assembly (MLA) three times Ramesh Chandra Panda's was also a Member of the Communist Party of India (Marxist) and played a significant role in Odisha's politic's.

== Gallery ==
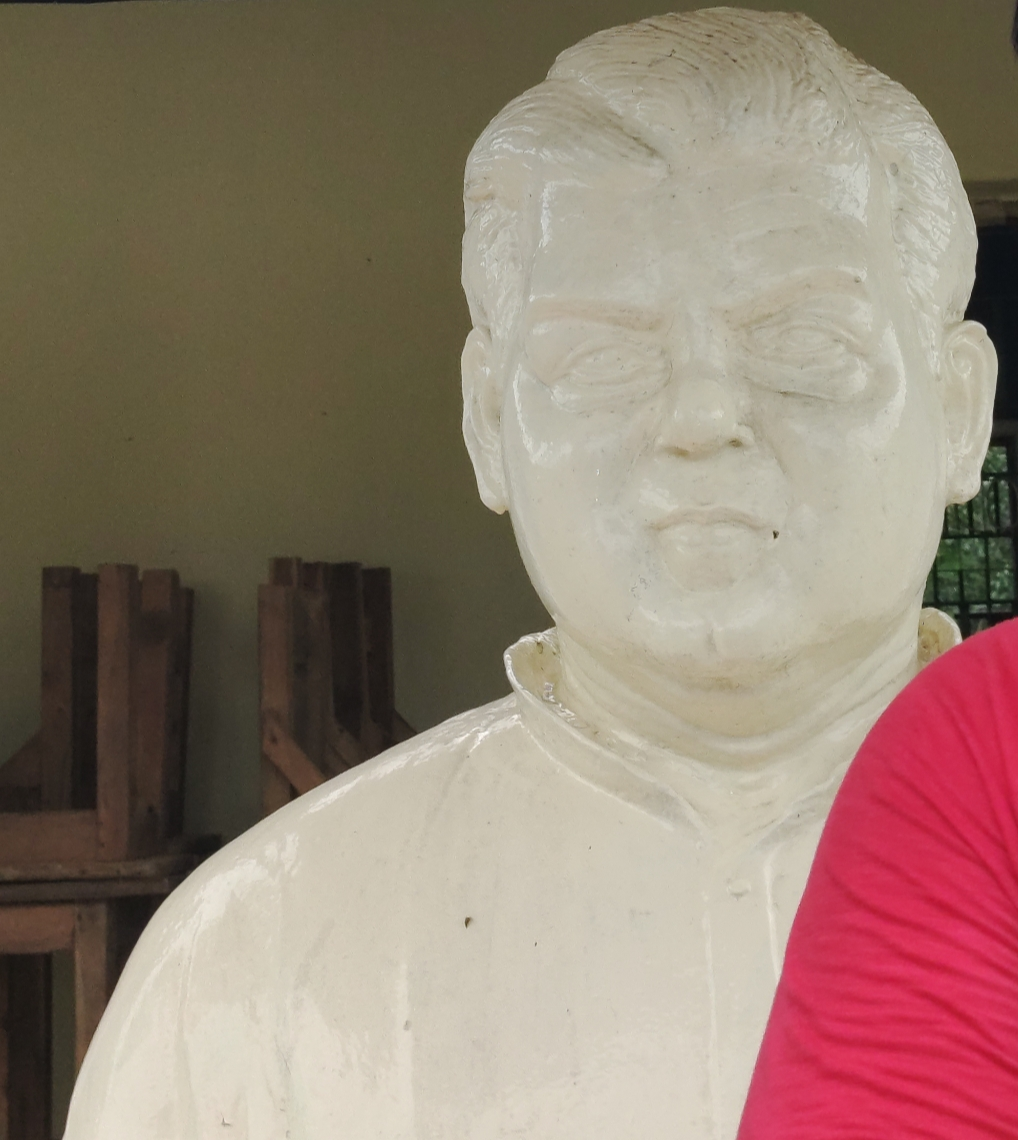
Ramesh Chandra Panda, Statues, A R M College Mayurajhalia In College in Borabarjhar, Odisha

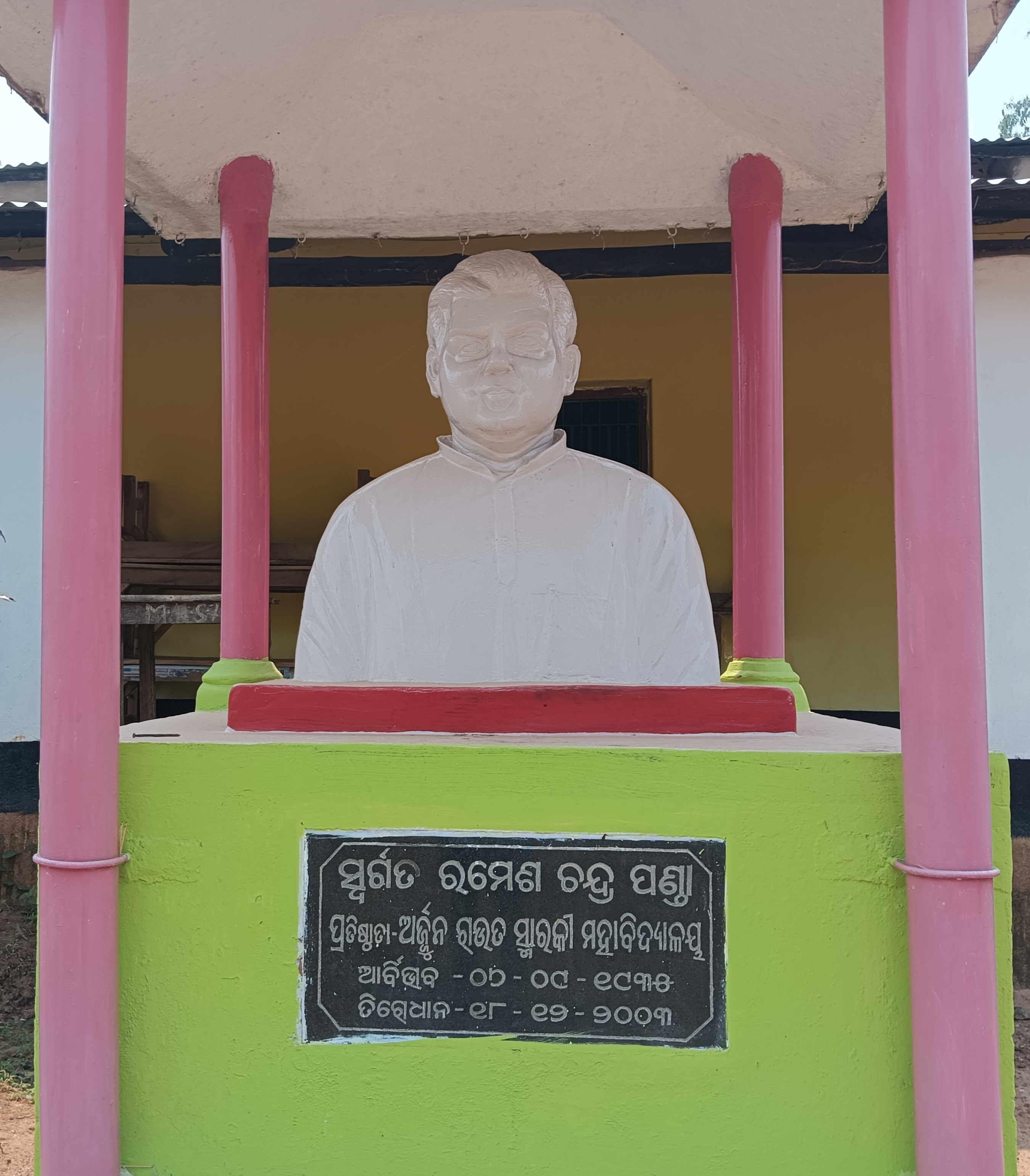
Late Ramesh Chandra Panda Foundation-Arjuna Rout Memorial College (Statue —2025) Mayurajhalia In College in Borabarjhar, Odisha

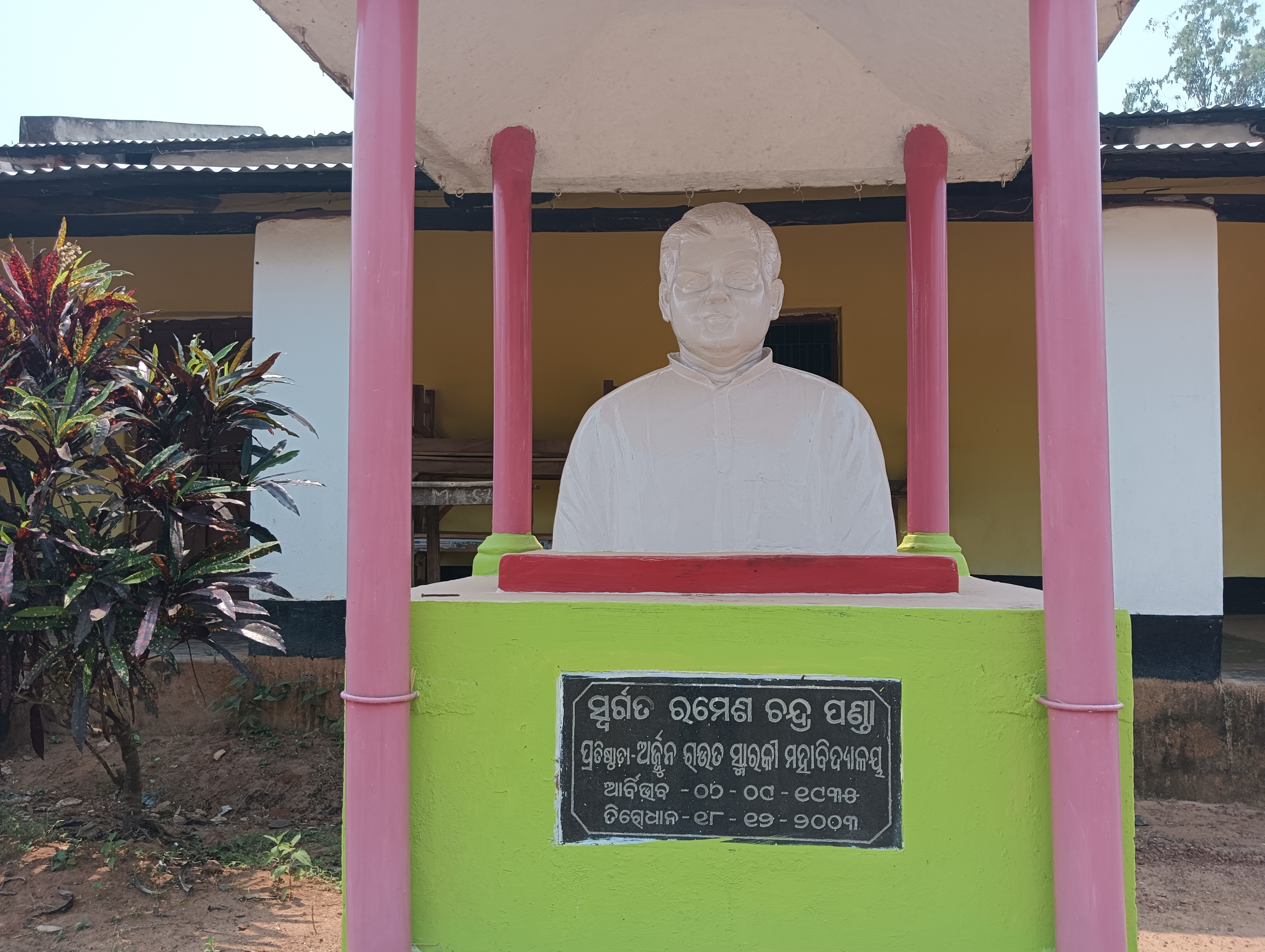
Late Ramesh Chandra Panda Foundation-Arjuna Rout Memorial College (Statue—2025) In Mayurajhalia In College in Borabarjhar, Odisha

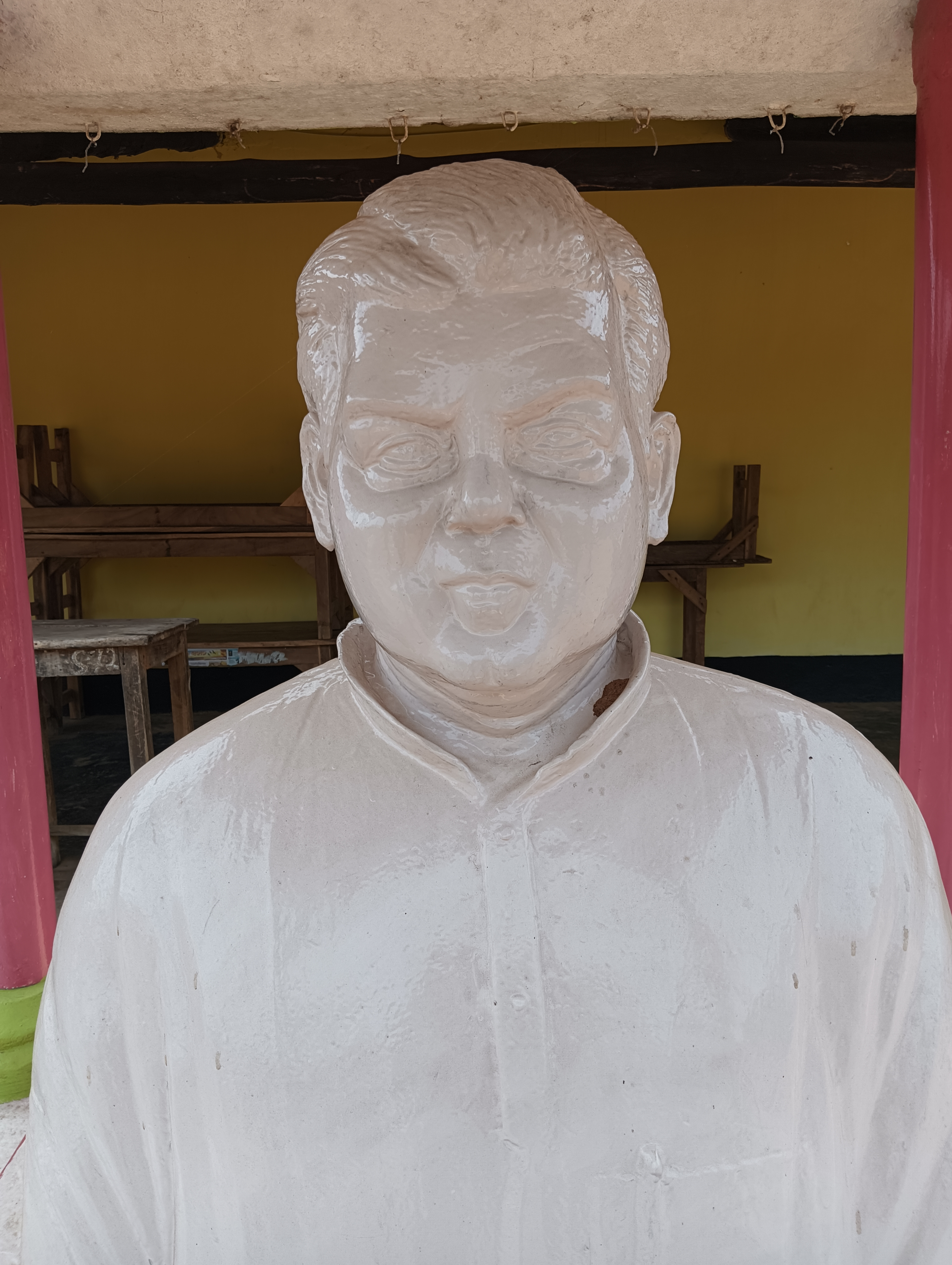
Late Ramesh Chandra Panda Foundation-Arjuna Rout Memorial College (Statue —2025) Mayurajhalia In College in Borabarjhar, Odisha
