= Mayurjhalia =

Village in Odisha

Mayurjhalia ମୟୁରଝଲିଆ Borabarjhar
- Village In Odisha
- Mayurajhalia
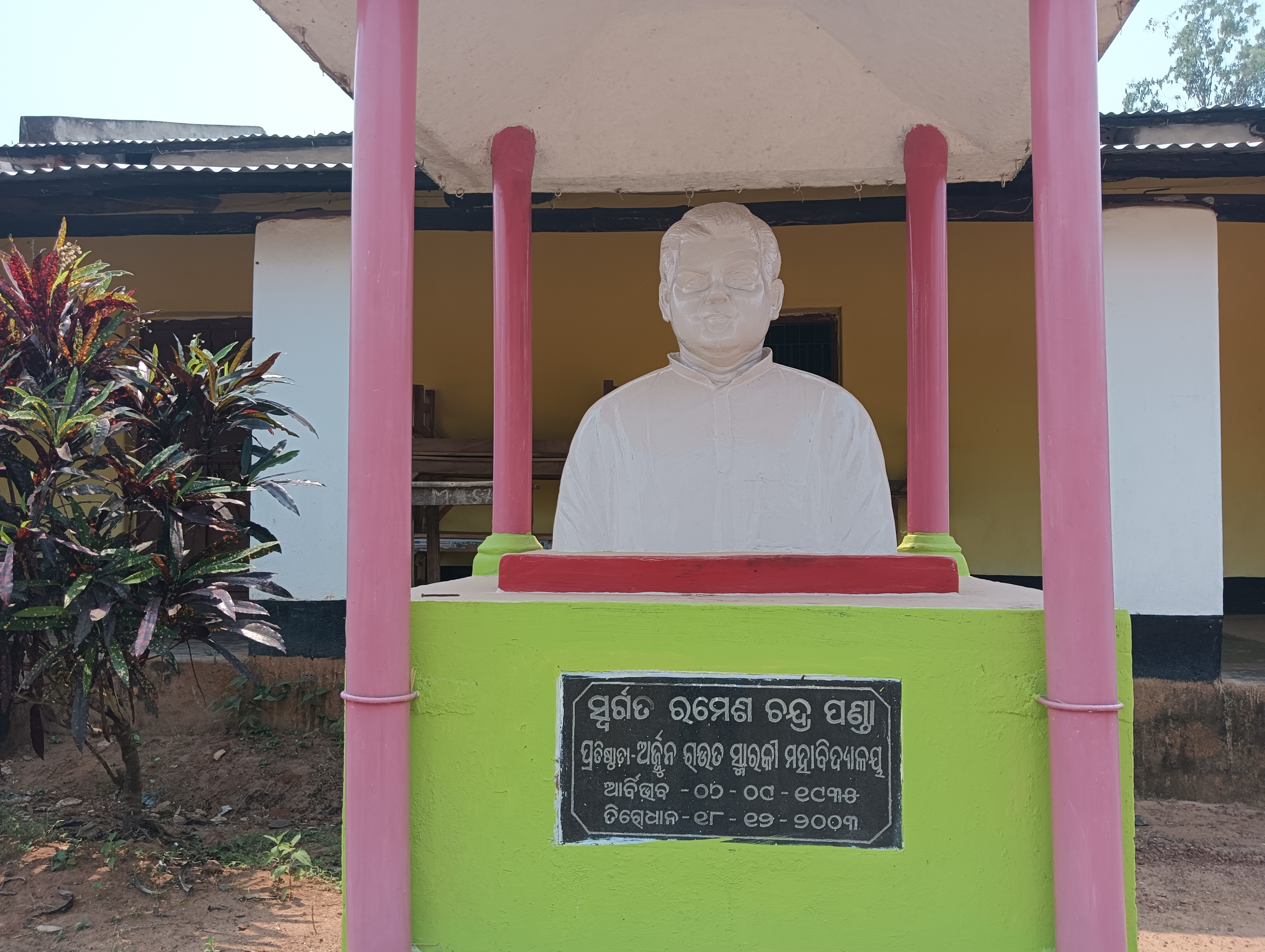
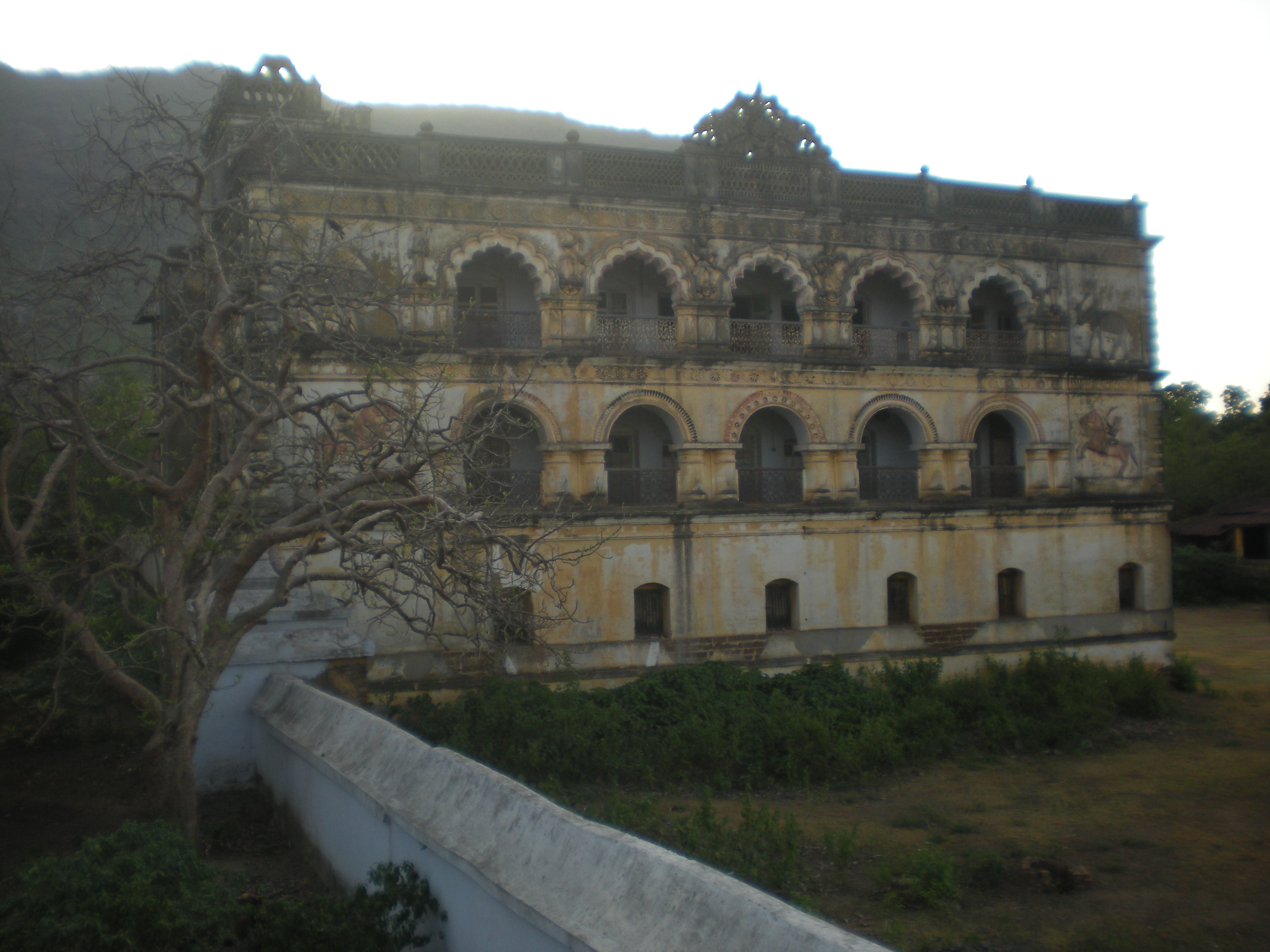
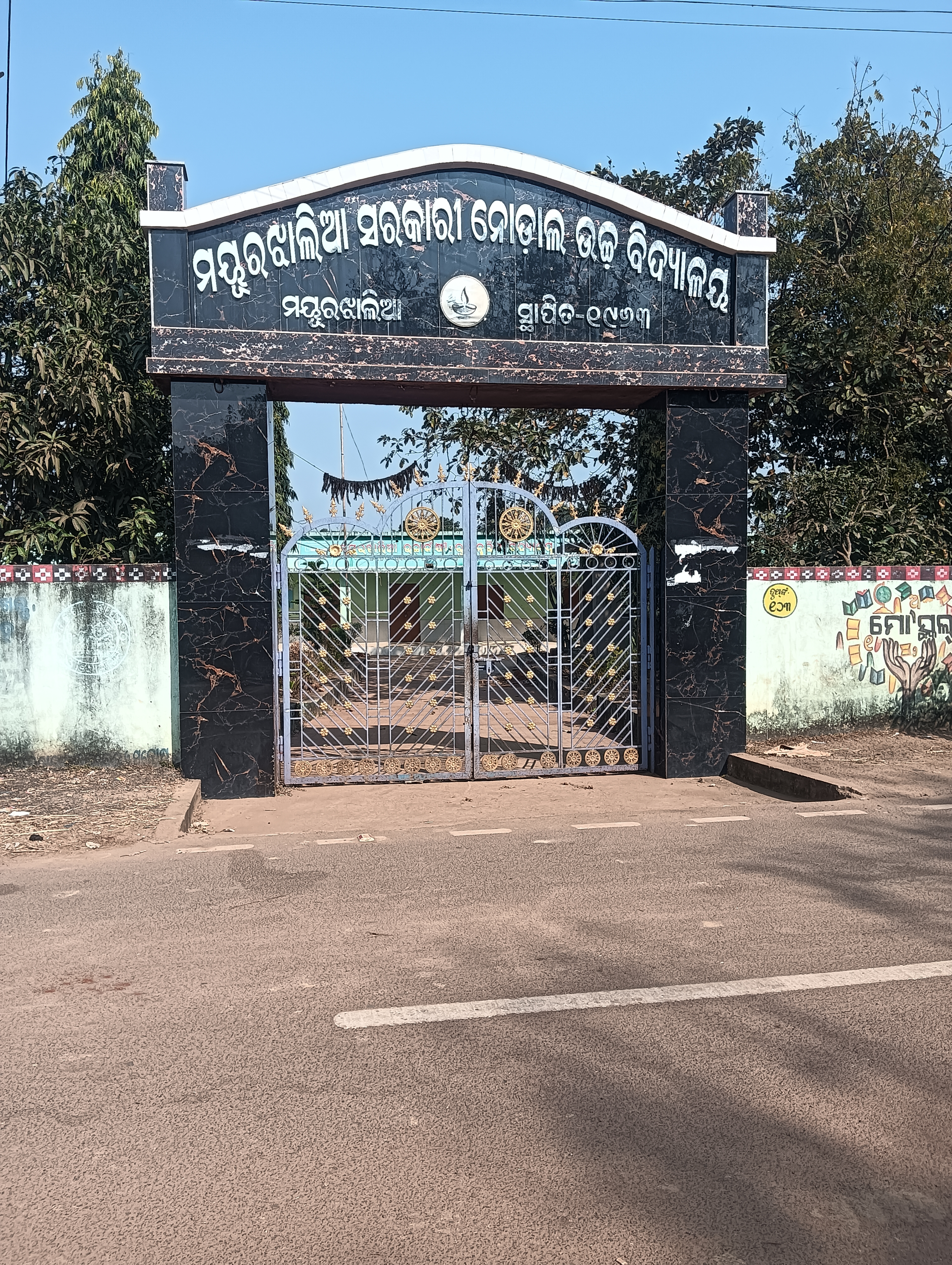
- Late, Ramesh Chandra Panda, at the college Arjuna Rout Memorial College in a village Mayurjhalia Raj-Ranpur, Nayagarh, Odisha Raj Mahal of Ranapur State at the Raj-Ranpur, Odisha, India Mayurajhalia High School, is a government-managed, co-educational high school in the rural area of Mayurjhalia, Nayagarh, Odisha, India.
- Nickname: MYJ
- Location in Odisha, India Mayurjhalia (India)
- Country: India
- State: Odisha
- District: Nayagarh district
- Tehsil: Ranapur
- Established: February 13, 1676
- Founder: Ramesh Chandra Panda
- Named for: Mayurajhalia

Government
  - Type: Panchayati Raj and Tahsildar
  - Body: Ranpur Assembly Constituency

Area Village
  - Total: 3.50 km^{2} (1.35 sq mi)

Population (2011)
  - Total: 5,064
  - Density: 1,450/km^{2} (3,750/sq mi)

Languages
  - Official: Oriya
- Time zone: UTC+5:30 (IST)
- PIN: 752025
- Vehicle registration: OD-25
- Website: odisha.gov.in

Mayurjhalia, (also spelled as Mayurajhalia), is a prominent Indian village in Odisha and Gram Panchayat situated in the Ranpur tehsil of the Nayagarh district in Odisha, are maintained under Mayurjhalia Mouza within the Ranpur tehsil administration. It operates under the jurisdiction of the Chandpur Police Station and is governed by its own Gram Panchayat Office. It is sometimes referred to in abbreviations simply as MYJ or MJL and commonly known as Mayurjhalia or administrative records spelled as Mayurajhalia.

== Gram Panchayat ==
The Gram Panchayat includes sub-villages such as Borabarjhar, Jokagadia, Bokakhai, and Jharapada.

== Geography ==
Mayurjhalia is located about 15 km away from the sub-district headquarter, Ranapur, and approximately 45 km from the district headquarter, Nayagarh. The total geographical area of the village is about 318 hectares (3.18 km²).

== History ==
Historical records about Mayurjhalia are limited, but it has been part of the traditional Ranapur region of Nayagarh. Local oral traditions suggest the village has existed for several centuries under small feudal estates before the integration of Nayagarh into the Odisha state after independence.

== Demographics ==
According to the 2011 Census of India:

- Total population: 1,925 (1,016 males and 909 females)
- Number of households: 431
- Children aged 0-6: 210 (116 males, 94 females) → about 10.9% of total population.
- Sex ratio: 895 females per 1,000 males, lower than the Odisha state average.
- Literacy rate: about 85.42% overall; male literacy ~91.89%, female literacy ~78.28%.

== Administration ==
Mayurjhalia, is a Gram Panchayat governed by a Sarpanch, elected under the Panchayati Raj system. The village PIN code is 752025.

== Temples and landmarks ==
Mayurjhalia hosts several small temples dedicated to Hindu deities. Among them, the Jagannath temple and Shiva temple are places of local worship and cultural gathering.

== Education ==
The village has educational institutions including the Arjuna Rout Memorial Higher Secondary School, in Mayurjhalia.

== Culture ==
Festivals such as Rath Yatra, Durga Puja, and Makar Sankranti are widely celebrated in the village. Local folk performances, including Odissi and Pala, are sometimes staged during festive seasons.

== Infrastructure and connectivity ==
Mayurjhalia is connected by road, with both public and private bus services available. The nearest railway station is more than 10 km away.

== Nearby places ==
Nearby villages and towns include Gopalpur, Narasinghpur, and Ranapur.

== See also ==
- Borabarjhar
- Nayagarh
- Raj-Ranpur
- Itamati
- Chandpur
