= Kesiapalli =

- Village
- Location in Orissa state of India
- Coordinates: 20.141220°N 85.376644°E
- Country: India
- State: Orissa
- District: Nayagarh

Area
  - Total: 0.46 km^{2} (0.18 sq mi)

Population
  - Total: 269
  - Density: 580/km^{2} (1,500/sq mi)
- Time zone: UTC+5:30 (IST)
- Postal code: 752026

Kesiapalli is a small census village in Nayagarh district of Indian state, Odisha. It is administered under Kulasara Grampanchayat and comes under the Ranapur tehsil. The small village had a population of 269 in 2011. It has a total area of 46 hectares out of which 1.01 hectares are irrigated land, 40.65 hectares are unirrigated land and 4.74 hectares are non-agricultural land.
