= Borabarjhar =

Village in Odisha, India

Borabarjhar ବୋରବାରଝର
- Village
- Location in Odisha, India
- Country: India
- State: Odisha
- District: Nayagarh district
- Tehsil: Ranapur

Area
  - Total: 3.50 km^{2} (1.35 sq mi)

Population (2011)
  - Total: 1,475
  - Density: 421/km^{2} (1,090/sq mi)
- Time zone: UTC+5:30 (IST)
- PIN: 752025
- Vehicle registration: OD-25

Borabarjhar, also located within closely associated with the area village of Hariharpur, are essentially two names for the same village both fall under the same local as a single integrated community is a village in the Ranapur tehsil of Nayagarh district in the Indian state of Odisha. It falls under the administrative jurisdiction of the Mayurjhalia gram panchayat.

== Geography ==
Borabarjhar is located in the Ranapur block of Nayagarh district. The total geographical area of the village is 350 hectares (860 acres). It is situated approximately 15 kilometres (9.3 mi) from the sub-district headquarters Ranapur and 45 kilometres (28 mi) from the district headquarters Nayagarh.

== Demographics ==
As of the 2011 Census of India, Borabarjhar had a total population of 1,475, of which 727 were males and 748 were females. The village has a sex ratio of 1029 females per 1000 males, which is higher than the Odisha state average. The literacy rate of the village was recorded as 84.31%.

== Administration ==
The village is administered by a Sarpanch, who is the elected representative of the village under the Constitution of India and the Panchayati Raj act. The village operates under the specific postal code (PIN) of 752025, served by the Mayurjhalia branch post office.
