= Katakasahar =

Village in Odisha, India

Katakasahar କଟକସହର
- Village
- Country: India
- State: Odisha
- District: Nayagarh
- Tehsil: Ranapur

Government
  - Type: Gram Panchayat

Area
  - Total: 0.76 km^{2} (0.29 sq mi)

Population (2011)
  - Total: 655
  - Density: 860/km^{2} (2,200/sq mi)
- Time zone: UTC+5:30 (IST)
- PIN: 752024
- Telephone code: 06755
- Vehicle registration: OD-25
- Census code: 406971

Katakasahar (also spelled Katakasahara) is a village in the Ranapur Tehsil of Nayagarh district in the Indian state of Odisha. It falls under the administrative jurisdiction of the Ranapur Community Development Block.

== Geography ==
Katakasahar is located in the eastern part of Nayagarh district. The village covers a total geographical area of 76 hectares (190 acres). It is situated approximately 30 kilometres (19 mi) from the district headquarters Nayagarh and is part of the Ranapur police station jurisdiction.

== Demographics ==
According to the 2011 Census of India, Katakasahar had a total population of 655, split between 334 males and 321 females. The village comprises approximately 150 households. The literacy rate and other socio-economic indicators are recorded in the Primary Census Abstract of the District Census Handbook.

== Administration ==
The village is administered by a Sarpanch, who is the elected representative of the village under the Constitution of India and the Panchayati Raj act.

== Transport ==
The village is connected by local district roads to the tehsil headquarters in Ranapur. The nearest major railway station is Khurda Road Junction, while the nearest airport is Biju Patnaik International Airport in Bhubaneswar.

== See also ==
- Nayagarh district
- Ranapur, Odisha
