= Surama Padhy =

Speaker of Odisha Legislative Assembly

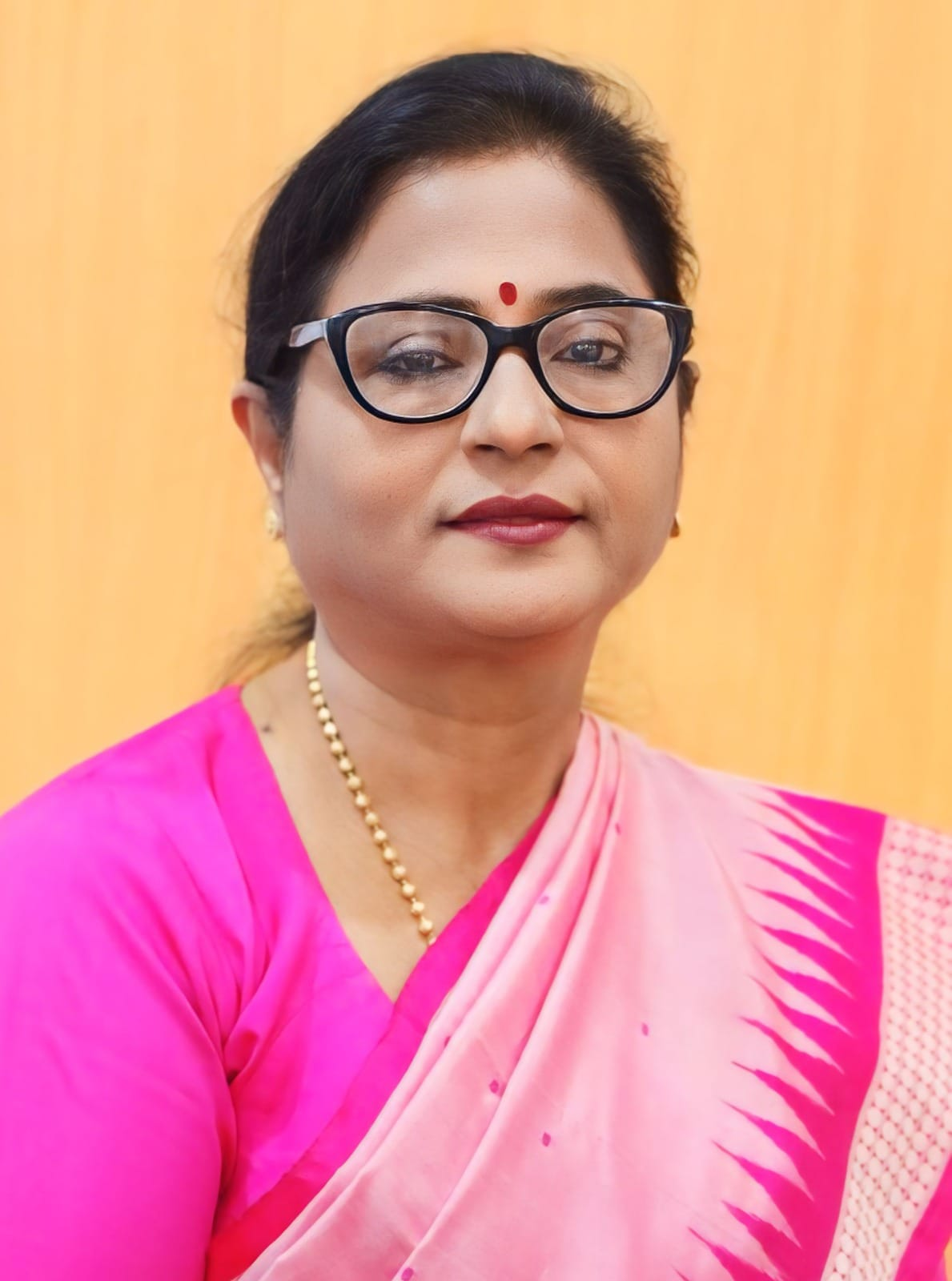

24th Speaker of the Odisha Legislative Assembly
- Incumbent
- Assumed office 20 June 2024
- Deputy: Bhabani Shankar Bhoi
- Chief Minister: Mohan Charan Majhi
- Preceded by: Pramila Mallik

Minister of State (Independent Charge) for Cooperation Government of Odisha
- In office 18 May 2004 – 9 March 2009
- Preceded by: Arabinda Dhali
- Succeeded by: Naveen Patnaik

Member of the Odisha Legislative Assembly
- Incumbent
- Assumed office 4 June 2024
- Preceded by: Satyanarayana Pradhan
- Constituency: Ranpur
- In office 16 May 2004 – 16 May 2009
- Preceded by: Ramakanta Mishra
- Succeeded by: Satyanarayana Pradhan
- Constituency: Ranpur

President of the BJP Mahila Morcha
- In office 2000 – 2002
- Preceded by: Maya Singh
- Succeeded by: Kanta Tai Nalawade

Personal details
- Born: 29 December 1960 (age 65) Raj-Ranpur
- Party: Bharatiya Janata Party
- Spouse: Bipin Bihari Padhy
- Children: Alee Padhy (daughter), Ashutosh Padhy (son)
- Parents: Harischandra Padhy (father); Urmila Padhy (mother)
- Education: Master of Arts; Bachelor of Laws
- Alma mater: Utkal University
- Profession: Advocate; Politician

Surama Padhy, also spelt as Surma Padhi, is an Indian politician from Odisha. She is a Member of Odisha Legislative Assembly from Ranpur Assembly constituency in Nayagarh district. She is currently serving as the 24th Speaker of Odisha Legislative Assembly from 2024. She represents Bharatiya Janata Party. She won the 2024 Odisha Legislative Assembly election.

== Early life and education ==
Padhy is from Ranpur. She married Bipin Bihari Padhy, a chartered accountant. She completed her Master of Arts degree in 1982 at Ravenshaw College which is affiliated with Utkal University.

== Career ==
Padhy won the 2024 Odisha Legislative Assembly election from Ranpur Assembly constituency representing the Bharatiya Janata Party. She defeated Satyanarayan Pradhan of the Biju Janata Dal by a margin of 15,544 votes. Earlier, she lost thrice from Ranpur, the last time in the 2019 Odisha Legislative Assembly election to Pradhan by 4,251 votes. She is also a former minister of state for cooperation in the 2004 Naveen Patnaik BJD government which had an alliance with BJP.
