= Ranpur Assembly constituency =

Constituency of the Odisha legislative assembly in India

Coordinates: 20.06°N 85.34°E

Ranpur
- Constituency No. 119 for the Odisha Legislative Assembly
- Ranpur Assembly constituency in Nayagarh district

Constituency details
- Country: India
- Region: East India
- State: Odisha
- Division: Central Division
- District: Nayagarh
- Lok Sabha constituency: Puri
- Established: 1951
- Total electors: 2,09,600 (Note: as on 2024) (Note: as data published by election commission)
- Reservation: None

Member of Legislative Assembly
- 17th Odisha Legislative Assembly
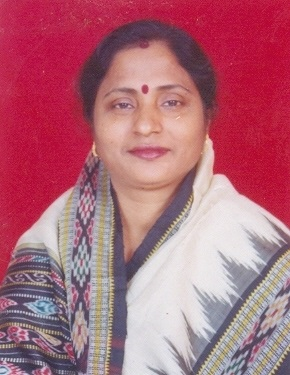
- Incumbent Surama Padhy
- Party: Bharatiya Janata Party
- Elected year: 2024

Ranpur, also written as Raj-Ranpur, is a Vidhan Sabha constituency of Nayagarh district, Odisha.

This constituency includes Ranpur block and 18 Gram panchayats of Odagaon block. Those 18 Gram panchayats are Gotisahi, Solapata, Bhaliadihi, Magarabandha, Saranakul, Sikharpur, Angisingi, Dimisara, Godipada, Haridabandha, Panchumu, Kajalaipalli, Golagaon, Barasahi, Godipalli, P Manpur, Mayurjhalia, Borabarjhar, Hariharpur and Badagorada.

== Elected members ==
Vote share of winning candidates
2024	52.27%
2019	46.66%
2014	44.47%
2009	54.48%
2004	48.13%
2000	46.68%
1995	51.75%
1990	54.93%
1985	63.40%
1980	51.49%
1977	23.12%

Since its formation in 1951, 17 elections have been held here till date.

List of members elected from Ranpur constituency are:

Year	Member	Party
2024	Surama Padhy	Bharatiya Janata Party
2019	Satyanarayan Pradhan	Biju Janata Dal
2014	Rabinarayan Mohapatra	Biju Janata Dal
2009	Satyanarayan Pradhan	Biju Janata Dal
2004	Surama Padhy	Bharatiya Janata Party
2000	Ramakanta Mishra	Indian National Congress
1995	Ramakanta Mishra	Indian National Congress
1990	Sarat Chandra Mishra	Janata Dal
1985	Ramakanta Mishra	Indian National Congress
1980	Ramakanta Mishra	Indian National Congress (I)
1977	Ramesh Chandra Panda	Communist Party of India (Marxist)
1974	Ramesh Chandra Panda	Communist Party of India (Marxist)
1971	Ramesh Chandra Panda	Communist Party of India (Marxist)
1967	Brajendra Chandra Bir. Baj. Narendra Mohapatra Singh Deo	Indian National Congress
1961	Ram Chandra Ram	Communist Party of India
1957	Basanta Manjari Devi	Indian National Congress
1951	Basanta Manjari Devi	Indian National Congress

== Election results ==
=== 2024 ===
Voting were held on 25 May 2024 in 3rd phase of Odisha Assembly Election & 6th phase of Indian General Election. Counting of votes was on 4 June 2024. In 2024 election, Bharatiya Janata Party candidate Surama Padhy defeated Biju Janata Dal candidate Satyanarayan Pradhan by a margin of 15,544 votes.

2024 Odisha Vidhan Sabha Election, Ranpur
Party	Candidate	Votes	%	±%
BJP	Surama Padhy	81,439	52.27	
BJD	Satyanarayan Pradhan	65,895	42.29	
INC	Bibhu Prasad Mishra	4,952	3.18	
NOTA	None of the above	675	0.43	
Majority		15,544	9.98	
Turnout		1,55,815	74.34	
BJP gain from BJD				

=== 2019 ===
In 2019 election, Biju Janata Dal candidate Satyanarayan Pradhan defeated Bharatiya Janata Party candidate Surama Padhy by a margin of 4,251 votes.

2019 Odisha Legislative Assembly election: Ranpur
Party	Candidate	Votes	%	±%
BJD	Satyanarayan Pradhan	69,849	46.66	▲2.19
BJP	Surama Padhy	65,598	43.82	▲11.38
INC	Subhashree Panda	9,215	6.16	▼6.37
NOTA	None of the above	615	0.41	
Majority		4,251	2.84	
Turnout		1,49,706	70.51	
BJD hold				

=== 2014 ===
In 2014 election, Biju Janata Dal candidate Rabinarayan Mohapatra defeated Bharatiya Janata Party candidate Surama Padhy by a margin of 16,426 votes.

2014 Vidhan Sabha Election, Ranpur
Party	Candidate	Votes	%	±%
BJD	Rabinarayan Mohapatra	60,705	44.47	▼1.01
BJP	Surama Padhy	44,279	32.44	▲4.94
INC	Satyajit Pattnaik	17,110	12.53	▼9.03
NOTA	None of the above	720	0.53	−
Majority		16,426	12.03	▼5.95
Turnout		1,36,501	73.78	▲5.5
Registered electors		1,85,016		
BJD hold				

=== 2009 ===
In 2009 election, Biju Janata Dal candidate Satyanarayan Pradhan defeated Bharatiya Janata Party candidate Surama Padhy by a margin of 21,601 votes.

2009 Vidhan Sabha Election, Ranpur
Party	Candidate	Votes	%	±%
BJD	Satyanarayan Pradhan	54,643	45.48	−
BJP	Surama Padhy	33,042	27.50	−
INC	Ramakanta Mishra	25,898	21.56	−
Majority		21,601	17.98 (Note: % of total valid votes)	−
Turnout		1,20,162	68.28 (Note: 2004 Voter turnout was 68.70%)	▼0.42
BJD gain from BJP				
