= Rabinarayan Mohapatra =

Indian politician

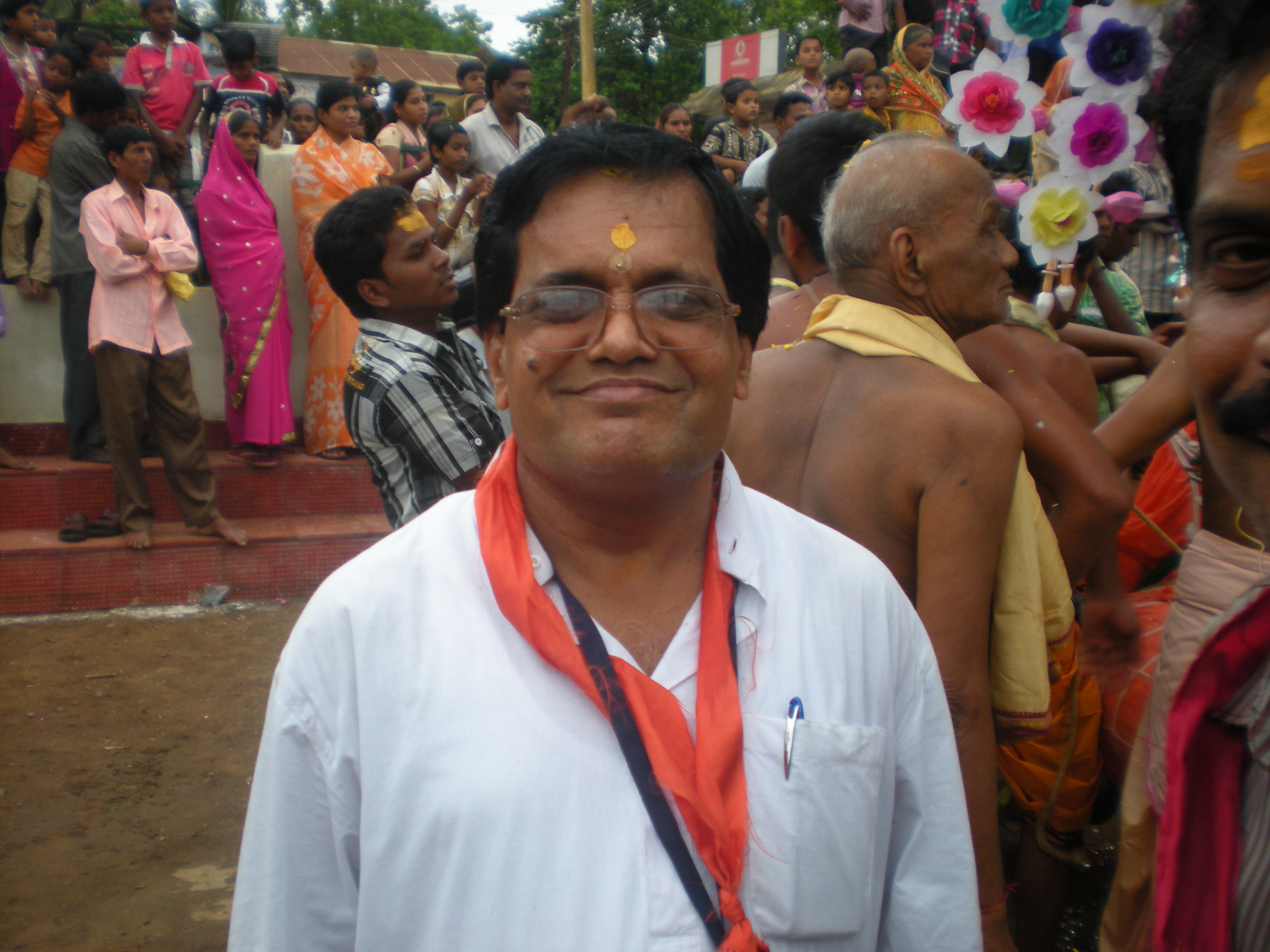

Member of Parliament, Rajya Sabha
- In office 2012–2014
- Constituency: Odisha

Personal details
- Born: 4 July 1957 (age 68)
- Party: Biju Janata Dal
- Other political affiliations: Janata Dal
- Spouse: Indira Devi

Rabinarayan Mohapatra is an Indian politician from the Biju Janata Dal party. He is a Member of the Parliament of India representing Orissa in the Rajya Sabha, the upper house of the Indian Parliament.
