= Chandpur, Odisha =

Village in Odisha, India

Chandpur Chandpur
- Village
- Chandpur
- Location in Odisha, India
- Coordinates: 19°56′26″N 85°24′16″E
- Country: India
- State: Odisha
- District: Nayagarh district
- Tehsil: Ranpur

Population (2011)
  - Total: 5,565
- Time zone: UTC+5:30 (IST)
- PIN: 752024
- Telephone code: 06755

Chandpur is a Village in the Nayagarh district of the Indian state of Odisha. It falls under the jurisdiction of the Ranpur Tehsil. The village is significant in the region for housing the Chandpur Police Station, which serves the local administrative. Tangi notified area council of Khordha district is the neighbour town of Chandpur

== Administration ==
Chandpur is administered as a Census Town within the Nayagarh district. It contains a police station that covers the surrounding villages in the Ranpur block.
