= Raj-Ranpur =

Town City in Odisha, India

Coordinates: 20.062819°N 85.344887°E

Raj-Ranpur, also written as Ranapurgarh, Ranapur or Ranpur, is a town and a Notified Area Council in the district of Nayagarh in the eastern Indian state of Odisha. The town is also known as Ranpurgarh or simply Ranpur as per the modern usage. The town is historically significant especially during the British Raj when it was the capital of the princely state of Ranpur. The martyrs Shaheed Raghu-Dibakar (Raghunath Mohanty and Dibakar Parida) who were hanged for their resistance to British rule belong to this place. Rajsunakhala and Tangi are the nearest Town of Raj-Ranpur, which in almost 10 to 20 km from the town. Rajsunakhala is the most important business centre in Ranpur block under Nayagarh district.

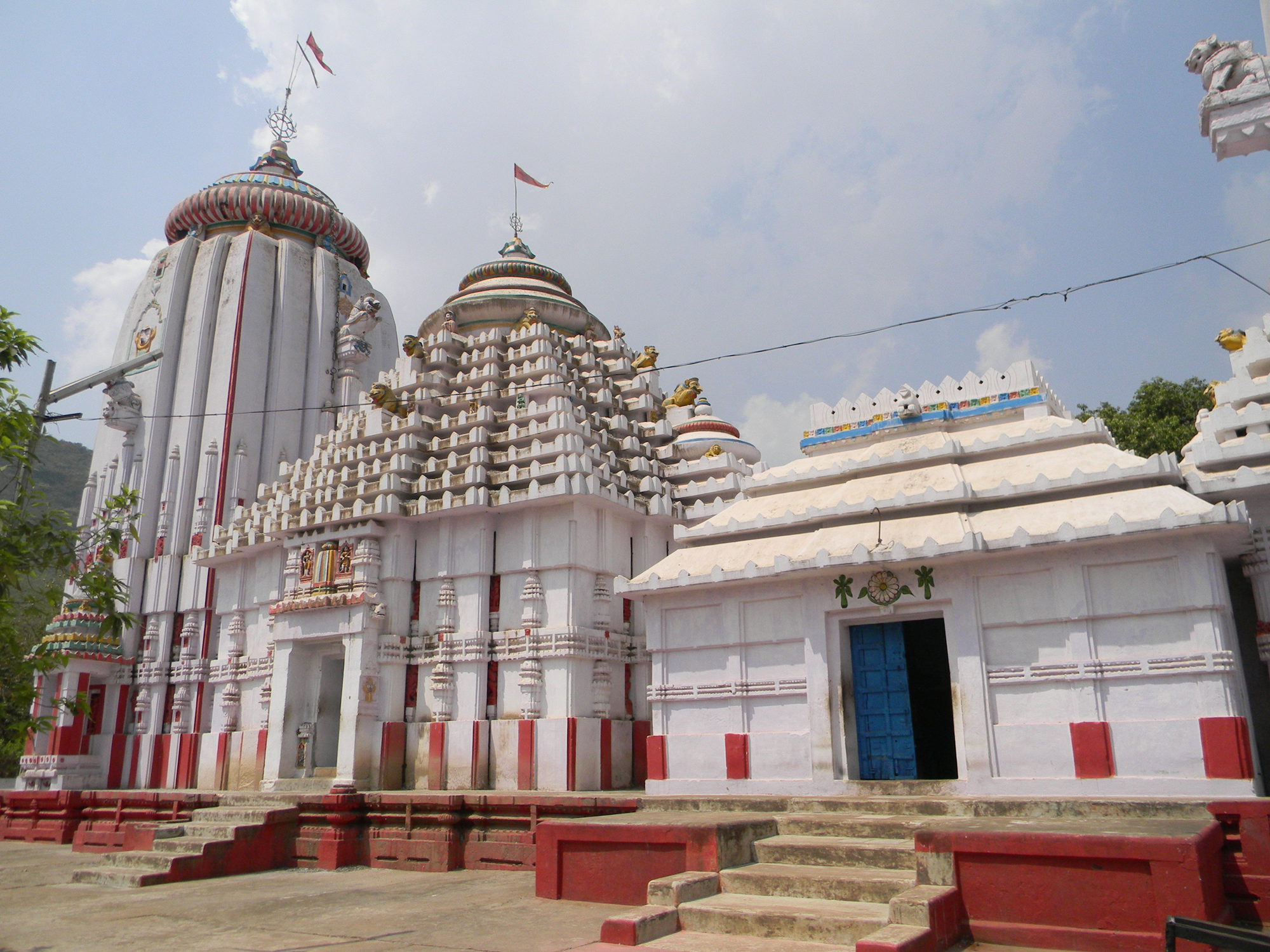
Ranapur Jagannath Temple

== Location and Geography ==
The Raj-Ranpur town is situated at the foothills of Maninag Hills which is a hill-system covering the whole of Ranpur and much of the surrounding areas. It is one of the most important towns in the Nayagarh district and also one of the important places in Odisha. New Jagannath Sadak passes through Raj-Ranpur and it connects Raj-Ranpur with Puri. It is situated at a distance of 63 kilometres south-west of the state capital Bhubaneswar. Also 13 Kilometers from Rajsunakhala. The area covering the town and the surrounding areas experiences a tropical climate as is experienced in most parts of the state. There are numerous fountains and water streams originating and running through the Maninag Hills. Mandakini (also known as Malaguni) is the traditional river associated with the place. Presently this river is in a very bad condition and has almost dried up. It is said that one of the poets of Odisha, Kabibara Radhanath Ray (Poet Radhanath Ray) composed many of his poems sitting beside the Malaguni river while enjoying its beauty.

The area is home to one of the biggest biodiversities in the state of Odisha. The varied vegetation includes Coconut trees, Mango trees, teakwood among others. There is also a protected rubber plantation in the area. Apart from these, the place is also important in the agriculture map. Crops like paddy, sugarcane, moong (green gram) are grown in the area making the people of Ranpur self-sufficient in terms of foodgrains available to the people. The crops in this area have faced drought many times because of many factors including the changing climate and the absence of a proper farm irrigation system in the area. This place is known for its cashew plantation. The king's palace is one of the oldest palaces of Odisha.

== History ==
The area which is now part of the Ranpur town and the surrounding villages have continuously been inhabited by humans since the ancient times. The Maninag Hills has many rocks and geological features which indicate the continuous inhabitation of the area by humans and other animals. As per the traditional legend associated with the place, there used to be an Asura (Demon) named Ranasura who was creating trouble for the population and making their life miserable. The king of Ranpur was able to defeat the demon and kill him. The place has taken its name from the demon and was known as Ranasurapura during the ancient times. The name had changed to Ranpur with due course of time.

Irrespective of the assertion that the place has seen continuous human habitation since ancient times, for many scholars and historians, the place was a vast wilderness almost till early medieval times. During the later medieval times, the Kingdom of Ranpur was established. The rulers of Ranpur were in continuous battle with the rulers of surrounding small kingdoms. Many times battles were fought between the rulers of Nayagarh and Ranpur with several military reverses inflicted on each other. Ranpur is also known as dwitiya Shreekhetra of Odisha as per historical data.

Since late medieval times, the rulers of Ranpur have shown their allegiance to the prominent rulers of Odisha. Ranpur has remained as a vassal kingdom of the Surya dynasty of Odisha which had famous kings like Kapilendra Deva, Purushottama Deva and Prataparudra Deva. After 1568, when Odisha fell to the Afghans of Bengal, the rulers showed their allegiance to the Afghans. Shortly afterwards in 1592, Odisha became part of the Mughal Empire after the successful military campaign of Man Singh against the Afghans of Bengal. The rulers of Ranpur again showed allegiance to the Mughals.

In 1803, the British occupied Odisha and started administering it as a part of Bengal Presidency. Modern Odisha became a Division within the Bengal Presidency. The rulers of Ranpur along with rulers of other small states and estates within Odisha showed their allegiance to the British. Ranpur formed part of an administrative unit under the British known as the Odisha Tributary States which consisted many princely states of Odisha. Initially the Odisha Tributary States was attached administratively to the Bengal Presidency. On 1 April 1912, Odisha was separated from Bengal and formed part of a new province called Bihar and Odisha. Accordingly, the Odisha Tributary States came to be attached with the Province of Bihar and Odisha and its administration came under the Governor of Bihar and Odisha. The Odisha Tributary States was also known as the Odisha States Agency. On 1 April 1936, Odisha and Bihar became separate provinces and the Odisha States Agency now became associated with the newly formed Odisha province which consisted of six districts: Balasore, Cuttack, Puri, Ganjam, Koraput, Sambalpur. Meanwhile, on 1 April 1933, the Odisha States Agency was merged with the Eastern States Agency which directly came under the administration of the Governor-General instead of a provincial Governor. After India achieved its independence, Ranpur along with the other 23 princely states within the Odisha States were merged with the Province of Odisha. After the independence and merger, many small and medium-sized princely states were made part of surrounding districts or part of newly formed districts. As such Ranpur became part of the Puri district in 1949.

By the end of 1950, Odisha had 13 districts. Between 1949 and 1993, Ranpur formed part of the Nayagarh Sub-Division within Puri district. In 1993, during the Janata Dal government of Odisha, the Chief Minister of the state Biju Patnaik resolved to increase the number of districts from 13 to 30. As per this resolution, the erstwhile Puri district was trifurcated into three districts, namely Nayagarh, Puri and Khordha in 1993. With this division and creation of new districts, Ranpur became part of the Nayagarh district on 1 April 1993 and this status continues till today.

== Demographics and culture ==
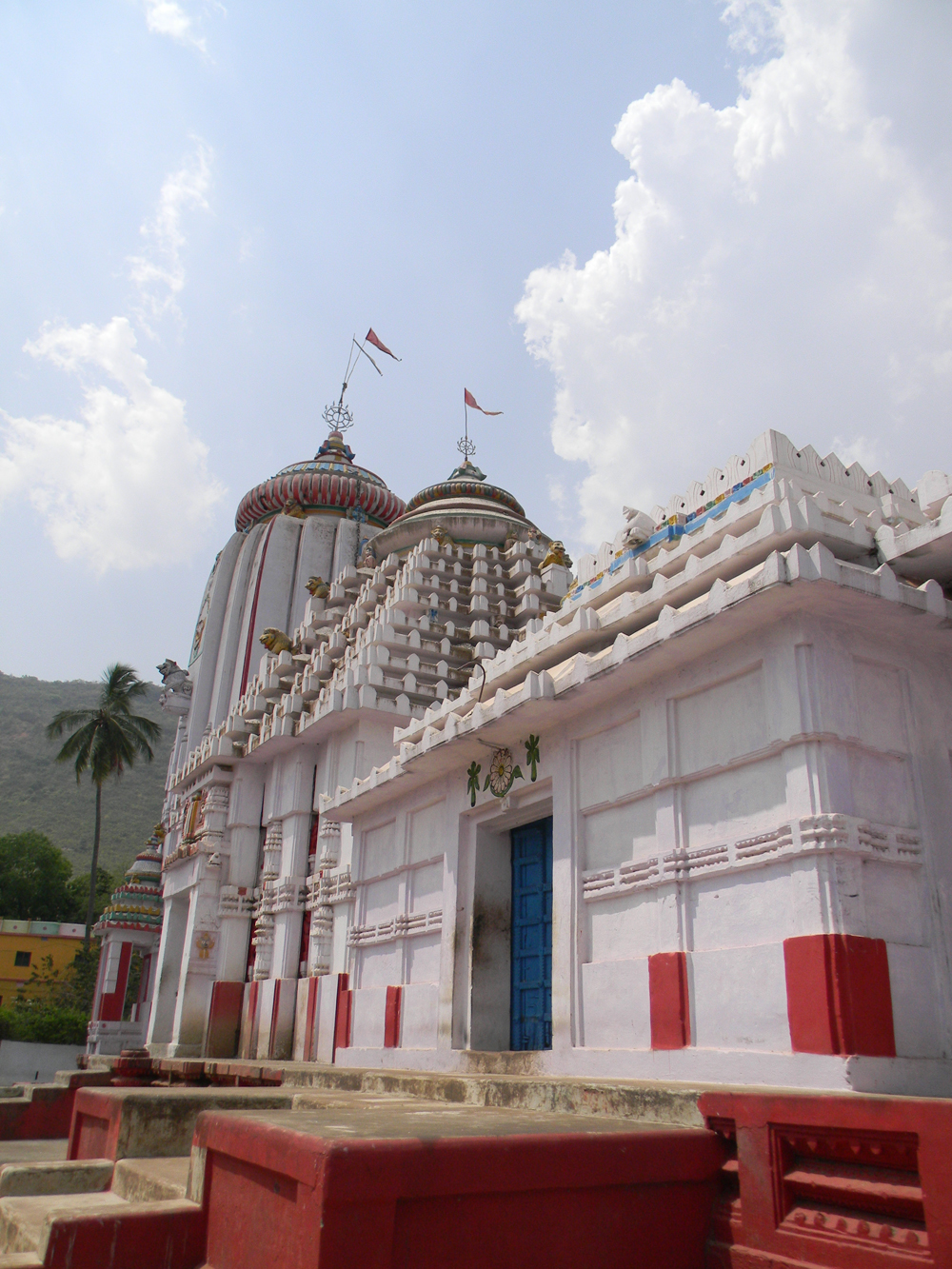
Ranapur Jagannath Temple

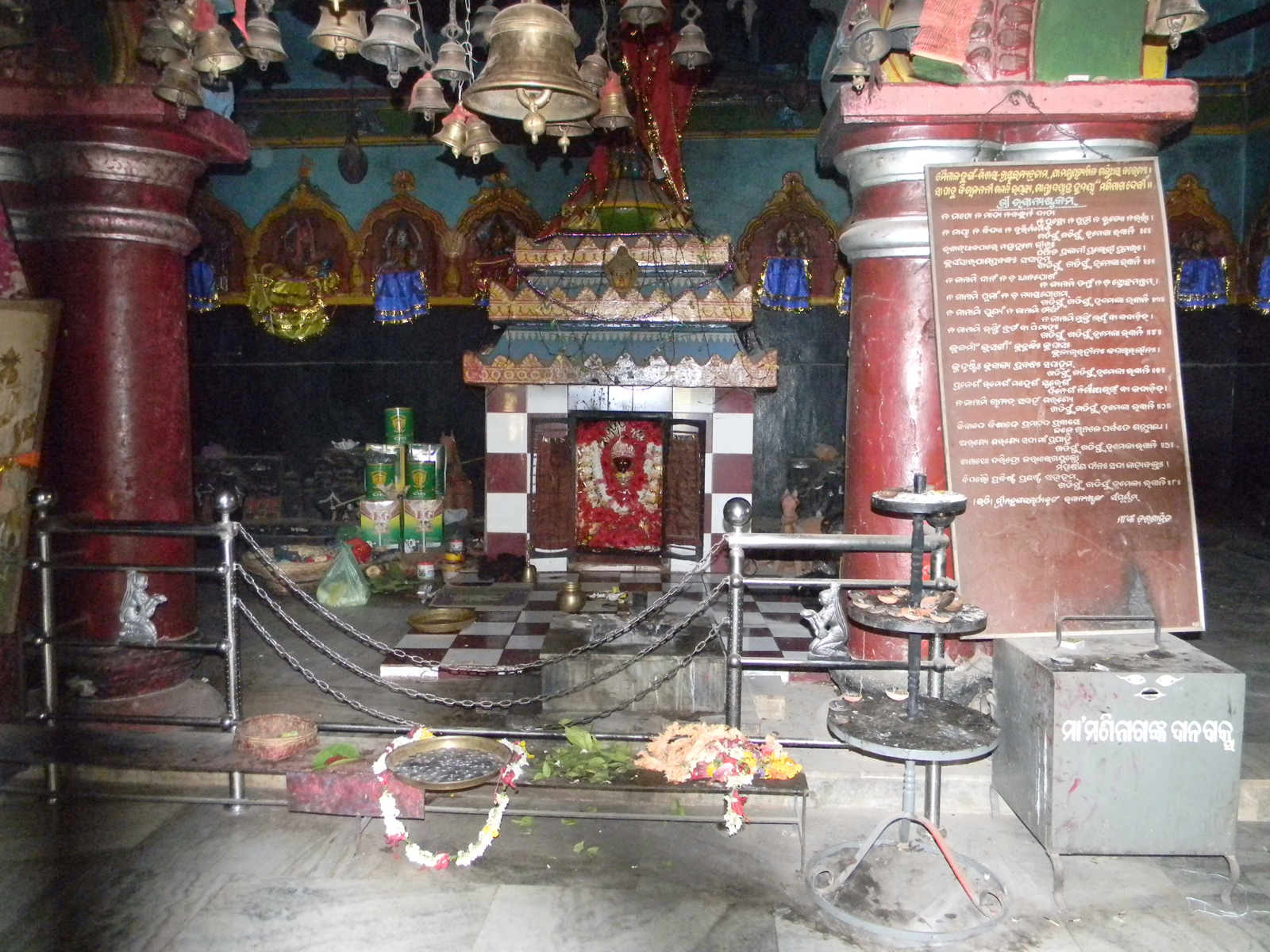
Maninaaga Devi, Ranpur

The town is famous for its magnificent Jagannath Temple (Jagannath Mandir in Oriya) which is situated in the main market area of the town. The Hindu deities Lord Jagannath, Lord Balabhadra and Goddess Subhadra are worshipped in this temple along with other Hindu Gods and Goddesses. The sanctum sanctorum (Garbha Gruha in Oriya) of the temple houses the three main deities whereas other Gods and Goddesses are worshipped elsewhere within the temple compound.

Also famous is the Rath Yatra (Ratha Jatra in Oriya), the Chariot Festival which falls in June/July every year. The three deities Lord Jagannath, Lord Balabhadra and Goddess Subhadra visit the Gundicha Temple riding on these three chariots specially designed and decorated for each of them. The devotees pull the chariots with all the enthusiasm and devotion. After nine days, the deities are brought back to the main Temple. The festival attracts a huge crowd from surrounding areas and elsewhere in the district of Nayagarh and other places.

The town is also home to two temples dedicated to Shiva. The Swapneshwar Mandir dates from the medieval times whereas the Chandeshwar Mandir is relatively new.

Among other sites in the town, is the Royal Palace (Rajaprasada in Oriya) which is situated at the main market area near the Jagannath Temple. Ranpur was one of the 26 princely Indian States which were merged with the modern province of Odisha after India achieved independence in 1947. Owing to its small area and population the native state of Ranpur was placed under Category 'C' states within the Odisha States Agency which was an administrative unit of India during the British rule.

Ranpur is also a Legislative Assembly constituency which consists of the town and surrounding areas including nearby small towns of Chandpur and Raj-Sunakhala. as well as numerous small villages such as Kesiapalli. Ranpur also is one of the 8 Tehsils within the Nayagarh district. It is also one of the 8 C.D. Blocks in the district.

The town's roads connect to other places within the districts of Nayagarh and Khordha including Bhubaneswar, the state capital of Odisha. It has a hospital with proper infrastructure and amenities. The town is also home to the civil court of Ranpur which is one of the lower level courts subordinated to the Odisha High Court.

Maa Maninaga temple is also a temple in the history of Ranpur. A small temple built on the hilltop, it overlooks the town of Ranpur and has a birds eye view over a long distance. It is a short but arduous trek to the top, and offers views of the surroundings. However, due to the slash-and-burn method of cultivation by the locals, the green canopy of the hills has completely vanished and is in urgent need of afforestation.

== Politics ==
Ranpur is one of the 147 Legislative Assembly constituencies of Odisha. There are a total of four assembly constituencies within the district of Nayagarh. The other three constituencies are: Daspalla, Khandapada and Nayagarh. Ranpur has its own representation in the State Legislative Assembly of Odisha ever since the first General Elections were conducted in 1952 after India became a republic.

Leaders from different political parties have been representing Ranpur in the Vidhan Sabha. There have been elected MLAs from parties like the Indian National Congress, Communist Party of India, Communist Party of India (Marxist), Janata Party, Janata Dal, Bharatiya Janata Party and the Biju Janata Dal. Shri Ramakanta Mishra from the Congress holds the record for winning the most Vidhan Sabha elections from Ranpur. Among the earlier MLAs since 1952, notable are Raja Brajendra Chandra and Basanta Manjari Devi, both of whom belonged to the Congress Party.

Current MLA of Ranpur (Odisha Vidhan Sabha constituency) is Surama Padhy.
