= Bhubaneswar Lok Sabha constituency =

Lok Sabha constituency in Odisha

Coordinates: 20.325984°N 85.819077°E

Bhubaneswar OD-18
- Lok Sabha constituency
- Interactive Map Outlining Bhubaneswar Lok Sabha constituency

Constituency details
- Country: India
- Region: East India
- State: Odisha
- Assembly constituencies: Jayadev; Bhubaneswar Central; Bhubaneswar North; Ekamra-Bhubaneswar; Jatani; Begunia; Khurda
- Established: 1952
- Total electors: 16,75,019 (Note: as on 2024) (Note: as data published by election commission)
- Reservation: None

Member of Parliament
- 18th Lok Sabha
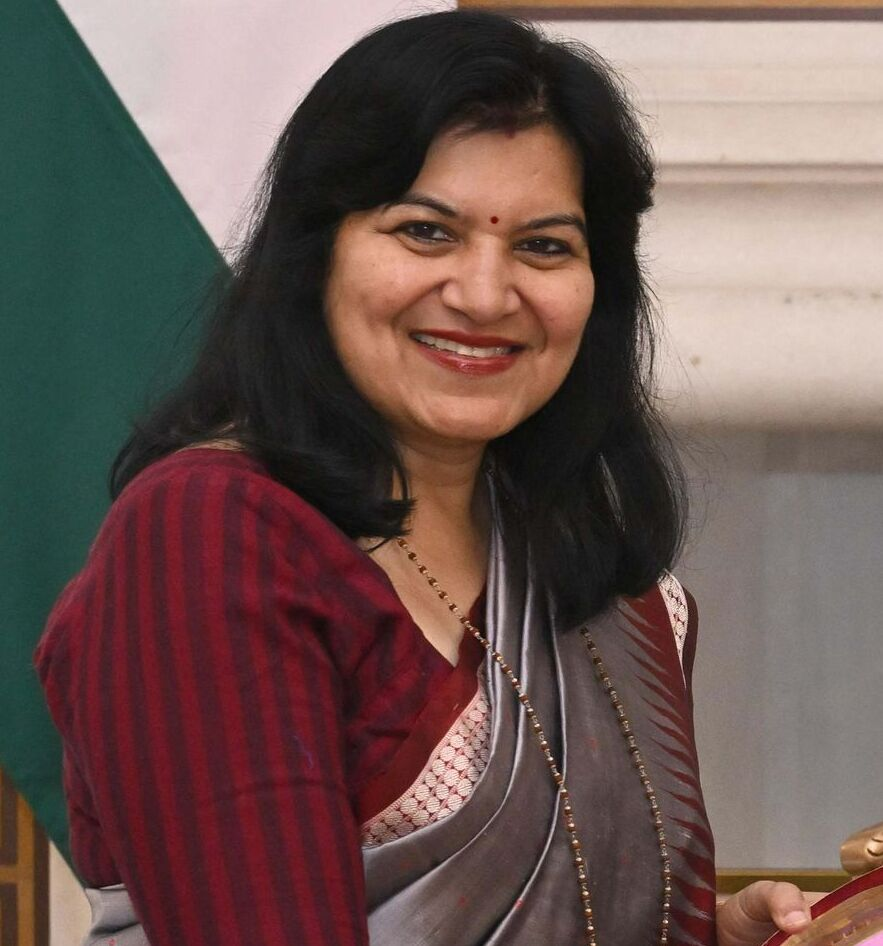
- Incumbent Aparajita Sarangi
- Party: BJP
- Elected year: 2024

Bhubaneswar Lok Sabha Constituency is one of the 21 Lok Sabha (Parliamentary) Constituencies in Odisha state in eastern India.

== Assembly Segments ==
Assembly Constituencies which constitute this Parliamentary Constituency, after delimitation of Parliamentary Constituencies and Legislative Assembly Constituencies of 2008 are:

#	Name	District	Member	Party	Leading (in 2024)
111	Jayadev (SC)	Khurda	Naba Kishor Mallick	BJD	BJD
112	Bhubaneswar Central	Khurda	Ananta Narayan Jena	BJD	BJP
113	Bhubaneswar North	Khurda	Susant Kumar Rout	BJD	BJP
114	Ekamra-Bhubaneswar	Khurda	Babu Singh	BJP	BJP
115	Jatani	Khurda	Bibhuti Bhusan Balabantaray	BJD	BJD
116	Begunia	Khurda	Pradip Kumar Sahu	BJD	BJD
117	Khurda	Khurda	Prasanta Kumar Jagadev	BJP	BJP

Assembly Constituencies which constituted this Parliamentary Constituency, before delimitation of Parliamentary Constituencies and Legislative Assembly Constituencies of 2008 are: Bhubaneswar, Jatani, Khurda, Begunia, Nayagarh, Khandapada and Daspalla.

== Elected members ==
Vote share of winning candidates
2024	47.36%
2019	48.43%
2014	49.25%
2009	56.31%
2004	51.32%
1999	66.27%
1998	57.61%
1996	47.45%
1991	43.48%
1989	58.51%
1984	60.07%
1980	62.53%
1977	44.9%
1971	49.89%

Since its formation in 1952, 18 elections have been held till date.

List of members elected from Bhubaneswar constituency are

Year	Member	Party
As Khurda Constituency
1952	Lingaraj Misra	Indian National Congress
As Bhubaneswar Constituency
1957	Nrusinha Charan Samantasinhar	Indian National Congress
1962	Raja Purna Chandra Bhanja Deo	Indian National Congress
1967	Chintamani Panigrahi	Indian National Congress
1971	Chintamani Panigrahi	Indian National Congress
1977	Sivaji Patnaik	Communist Party of India (Marxist)
1980	Chintamani Panigrahi	Indian National Congress (I)
1984	Chintamani Panigrahi	Indian National Congress
1989	Sivaji Patnaik	Communist Party of India (Marxist)
1991	Sivaji Patnaik	Communist Party of India (Marxist)
1996	Soumya Ranjan Patnaik	Indian National Congress
1998	Prasanna Kumar Patasani	Biju Janata Dal
1999	Prasanna Kumar Patasani	Biju Janata Dal
2004	Prasanna Kumar Patasani	Biju Janata Dal
2009	Prasanna Kumar Patasani	Biju Janata Dal
2014	Prasanna Kumar Patasani	Biju Janata Dal
2019	Aparajita Sarangi	Bharatiya Janata Party
2024	Aparajita Sarangi	Bharatiya Janata Party

== Election results ==
=== 2024 ===
Voting were held on 25th May 2024 in 6th phase of Indian General Election. Counting of votes was on 4th June 2024. In 2024 election, Bharatiya Janata Party candidate Aparajita Sarangi defeated Biju Janata Dal candidate Manmath Routray by a margin of 35,152 votes.

2024 Indian general election: Bhubaneswar
Party	Candidate	Votes	%	±%
BJP	Aparajita Sarangi	512,519	47.36	▼1.09
BJD	Manmath Routray	4,77,367	44.11	▼1.96
INC	Syed Yashir Nawaz	66,362	6.13	
NOTA	None of the above	8,302	0.77	▼0.16
CPI(M)	Suresh Chandra Panigrahy	4148		
Majority		35,152	3.25	▲0.87
Turnout		10,83,541	64.69	▲5.52
BJP hold				

=== 2019 ===
In 2019 election, Bharatiya Janata Party candidate Aparajita Sarangi defeated Biju Janata Dal candidate Arup Mohan Patnaik by a margin of 23,839 votes.

2019 Indian general election: Bhubaneswar
Party	Candidate	Votes	%	±%
BJP	Aparajita Sarangi	486,991	48.45	▲20.45
BJD	Arup Mohan Patnaik	4,63,152	46.07	▼3.18
CPI(M)	Janardan Pati	23,026	2.29	
AITC	Niranjan Sahoo	19,410	1.56	
NOTA	None of the above	6,156	0.61	
Majority		23,839	2.38	
Turnout		10,05,624	59.17	
BJP gain from BJD		Swing		

=== 2014 ===
In 2014 election, Biju Janata Dal candidate Prasanna Kumar Patasani defeated Bharatiya Janata Party candidate Prithviraj Harichandan by a margin of 1,89,477 votes.

2014 Indian general elections: Bhubaneswar
Party	Candidate	Votes	%	±%
BJD	Prasanna Kumar Patasani	439,252	49.25	▼7.06
BJP	Prithviraj Harichandan	2,49,775	28.00	▲14.79
INC	Bijay Mohanty	1,45,783	16.34	▼4.43
AOP	Sunjoy Hans	29,505	3.31	
NOTA	None of the above	8,140	0.91	
AAP	Bismaya Mahapatra	7,112	0.80	
Majority		1,89,477	21.25	▼14.30
Turnout		8,91,958	58.38	▲9.24
BJD hold				

=== 2009 ===
In 2009 election, Biju Janata Dal candidate Prasanna Kumar Patasani defeated Indian National Congress candidate Santosh Mohanty by a margin of 2,52,760 votes.

2009 Indian general elections: Bhubaneswar
Party	Candidate	Votes	%	±%
BJD	Prasanna Kumar Patasani	400,472	56.31	
INC	Santosh Mohanty	1,47,712	20.77	
BJP	Archana Nayak	93,980	13.21	
Bira Oriya Party	Nabaghan Parida	22,325	3.14	
Majority		2,52,760	35.55	
Turnout		7,11,041	49.14	
BJD hold				
