= Anubhav Patnaik =

Indian politician

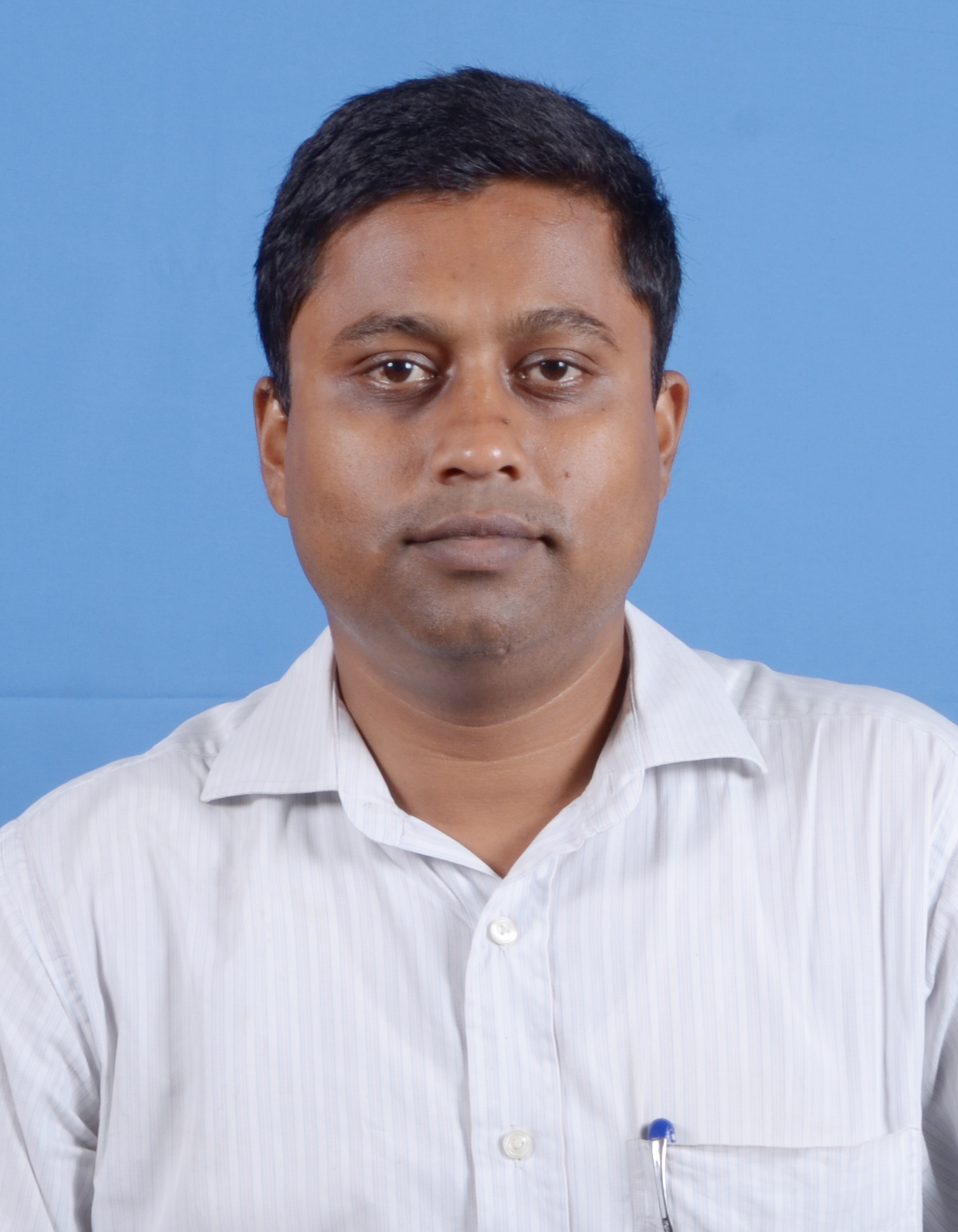
Anubhav Patnaik

Anubhav Patnaik (born 15 Aug 1980) is an Indian politician currently serving as the Advisor to E & IT Department of Odisha Government in the rank of Minister of State. He was the sitting MLA from Khandapada constituency for the state assembly of Odisha from 2014-2019. He is the son of Late Arun Kumar Patnaik, an erstwhile MLA of the state assembly. He has also been appointed as spokesperson by the ruling party of Odisha, Biju Janata Dal and secretary in charge of “Women Empowerment” for BJD.

== Early life ==
Patnaik was born on 15 Aug 1980 at Cuttack in a Karan family, Odisha in India. He is the son of Late Arun Kumar Patnaik, former MLA of state assembly . His father was a renowned personality of Odisha starting his political career in 1970s as president of Ravenshaw College, Cuttack and later first NSUI president of Odisha. To honour the sacrifices of Late Arun Kumar Patnaik, Khandapada celebrates his birth anniversary as “Jagrat Khandapada Divas” on 12 September. His mother Smt. Bijayalaxmi Patnaik, has also been the Member of Legislative Assembly from Khandapada Constituency in the year 2000 as a candidate of Biju Janata Dal, and again in the year 2004 as Independent candidate.

Patnaik has a corporate experience of 10 years. After MBA he joined Godrej & Boyce Mfg. Co. Ltd. as Sales Executive in 2004, meanwhile helping his mother Bijayalaxmi Patnaik for the welfare of his homeland. Later he got promoted to ASM in 2007 and then as AGM to Godrej & Boyce Mfg. Co. Ltd. handling Karnataka state in Bangalore from 2011.

== Education ==
Patnaik was educated at the DAV public school, Bhubaneswar in 1996 and later BJB College, Bhubaneswar in 1998. He did his graduation degree with Economics from BJB College, Bhubaneswar in 2001. He has done MBA with Marketing and HR from MICM, Bhubaneswar in 2003.

== Political career ==
Patnaik was inspired by his parents' effort for gradual evolution in the manner of living of his people. Biju Patnaik, former Chief Minister of Odisha, is his political idol, inspiring him to leave his job and contest as the MLA candidate. In 2014 defeating Shri Soumya Ranjan Patnaik, he was elected as an MLA of Biju Janata Dal from Khandapada assembly constituency.

He has been one of the four advisors to Biju Yuva Janata Dal, the Youth Wing of Biju Janata Dal. In 2019 he has been given charge as party’s state spokesperson by BJD. He was appointed as Advisor for the department of Electronics & Information Technology, Govt of Odisha, in the rank of Minister of State in 2019 and again reappointed in 2022. He is also secretary in charge of “Women Empowerment” for BJD from 2021.

The vision of Patnaik is to make our society a developed one, initiating from his own Khandapada Constituency with his slogan “Asa Gadhiba Shrestha Khandapada”.

== Outreach ==
He has been invited by NASSCOM to share his experience as an MLA in areas of agriculture and digital technology. He has been invited by Tata Trusts to its School and Community Science Programme He served as a member of the board of governors at Xavier University Bhubaneswar, IIIT Bhubaneswar and a member of Odisha State Housing Board. He has attended the roadshow held by Odisha Govt in the run up to the third Make in Odisha Conclave.

Patnaik has participated in the “Professional Fellows Program on Governance and Society, South and Central Asia” held in U.S. This was a project that brought together professionals and emerging leaders from India, Pakistan, Nepal and the U.S., sponsored by the U.S. State Department and administered by World Learning. This program was designed for an exchange of ideas, strategies, and best practices in legislative process and policymaking, while developing sustainable and enduring linkages with professional counterparts.

During the visit Patnaik was presented with Certificate of Achievement as Delegate from India, for the U.S. State Department’s ‘Legislative Fellows Program for South & Central Asia’. And also got recognized in the Ohio State Journal by Senator Yuko as a participant of this prestigious program.

== Child-Friendly Constituency ==
Patnaik has taken a lead in making his constituency Khandapada, the first Child-Friendly Constituency (CFC) in Odisha. He has collaborated with UNICEF and Kalinga Kusum Foundation in implementing the CFC.

He has played an important role in shaping the CFC so that no child is left behind in his constituency. Due to CFC, children in the constituency have been empowered through this initiative and have participated in Gram sabha meetings to raise issues related to child rights, nutrition and welfare. He shared his experience in CFC at the International Association for Adolescent Health (IAAH).

Child-Friendly Constituency is an initiative that allows communities and children within the constituency to proactively engage with their elected representatives and service providers on issues that concern children.

== Award ==
Patnaik is the recipient of Aadarsh Yuva Vidhayak Puraskar (Ideal Youth MLA) from Bharatiya Chhatra Sansad.
