= Shashi Bhusan Behera =

Indian politician (born 1953)

- ସଶୀ ଭୂଷଣ ବେହେରା
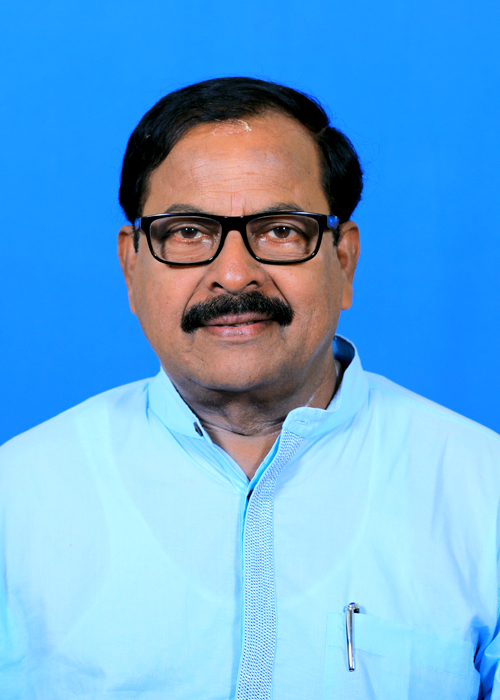

Member: Legislative Assembly of Odisha
- In office 2014–2019
- Preceded by: Arabinda Dhali
- Succeeded by: Arabinda Dhali
- Constituency: Jayadev

Member: Rajya Sabha
- In office 2010–2014
- Constituency: Odisha

Member: Finance and Excise minister's office
- Preceded by: Raghab Chandra Sethi
- Constituency: Balipatna

Personal details
- Born: 12 February 1953 (age 73) Nuapatna, Khurda district, Odisha, India
- Party: Biju Janata Dal
- Other political affiliations: Janata Dal
- Spouse: Suprabha Kumari Mohanty
- Children: One son and one daughter
- Parents: Late Shri Madhusudan Behera (father); Late Shri Shrimati Harshamani Behera (mother)
- Education: Graduate Educated at Ravenshaw College, Utkal University, Cuttack (Orissa)
- Profession: Political and Social Worker
- Bande Utkala Janani

Shashi Bhusan Behera (Odia: ସଶୀ ଭୂଷଣ ବେହେରା) is an Indian politician from Odisha and a member of the Biju Janata Dal party. He served as Minister of Finance & Excise, Public Enterprise Agriculture & Farmers' Empowerment, Fisheries & Animal Resources Development for Odisha from 2014 to 2019. He was a member of Rajya Sabha from 2010 to 2014 and served as member of the Odisha Legislative Assembly from Balianta & Balipatna (2004 – 2009), Jayadev (2014 – 2019) and Kendrapara (2019 – 2024).

== Early life and education ==
Shashi Behera, fondly called "Mantu" by his mother, was born on 12 Feb 1953 to Madhusudan Behera and Harshamani Behera of Nuapatna. Born at Jobra, Cuttack, Behera received his elementary education at Jobra Patitapaban School, later he shifted to Nuapatna where he received his Secondary Education at Banguari High School. Upon passing the 10th Examination (which then was 11th Class Examination) he was admitted to Ravenshaw University for further higher education. During his early days of university he was attracted to the social justice movement, especially working for the development of fishers and the labourers of different fields and getting them to the mainstream of society.

On 10 February 1989, he was married to Suprabha Mohanty, who supported him in his profession and also took care of his family. He admits that it is truly said "Behind a successful man there is a women" and credits his success to his wife.

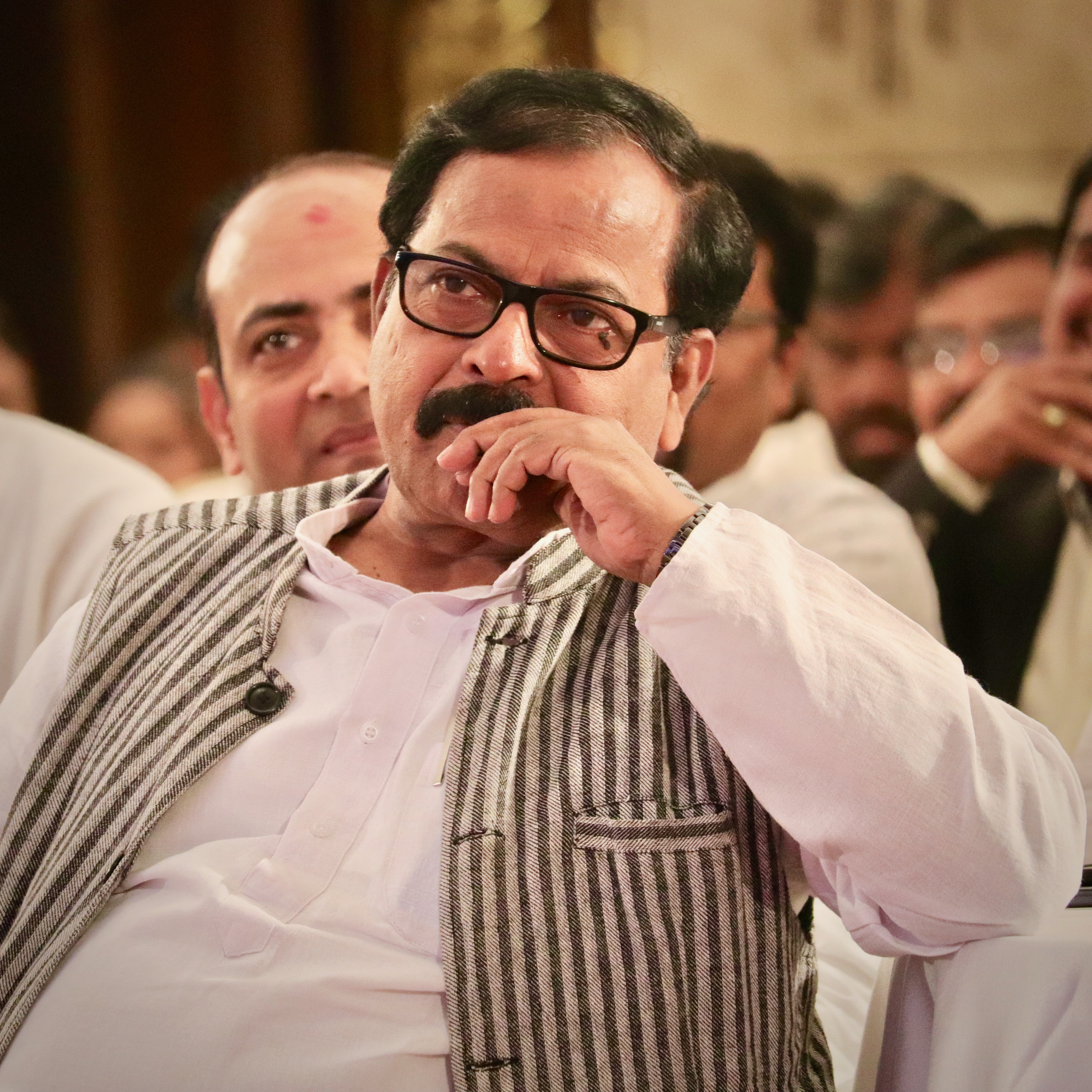
Shashi Behera in 2019

== Political career ==
Behera wanted to work for the upliftment of peoples who were not regarded as the part of the mainstream society. And it is because of his and Sj Akulananda Behera’s effort that the fisherman society was included in the Schedule Caste category of Odisha and that the poor and innocent peoples who never were regarded as part of the mainstream society now started to be included.

In 2004, Behera won from Balipatna on a Biju Janata Dal ticket. Within a year, the Speaker of the Odisha Legislative Assembly selected him for the Utkalmani Gopabandhu Samman, the assembly's award for its best legislator. In office, he focused on development work in Balianta and Balipatna, and pushed to rename the constituency after Jayadeva, the poet whose Gita Govinda is recited before Lord Jagannath every day.

By 2009, Behera expected to contest in Jaydev constituency. However, Naveen would assign Behera to work for the party at the national level. In 2010, he would be given a Rajya Sabha seat, the upper house of National Parliament, and made him leader of the Biju Janata Dal Parliamentary Party. In 2014, Behera was called mid-term to resign from his Rajya Sabhaseat to contest from Jaydev constituency. He would win the seat, and returned to the Odisha Legislative Assembly. He was assigned the Ministry of Finance and Excise and was later given with Public Enterprise and upon the resignation of the Agriculture Minister was given with additional charge of Ministry of Agriculture and Farmers' Empowerment, Fisheries & Animal Resources Development until 2019. In 2019, Behera would win from Kendrapara constituency and serve as MLA until 2024.

Behera also was former General Secretary and Vice–President of State Yuva Biju Janata Dal, President of Orissa Dalit Sena, Vice President of Samatamancha, State Executive Member of H.M.S. (Hindu Mazdoor Sabha), General Secretary of All Orissa Kaibarta Mahasangha, Secretary of Cuttack Homeopathic Medical College and Hospital.
