= Balipatna Assembly constituency =

Former constituency of the Odisha Legislative Assembly

Balipatna
- Former constituency for the Odisha Legislative Assembly

Constituency details
- Country: India
- Region: East India
- State: Odisha
- District: Khordha
- Lok Sabha constituency: Bhubaneswar
- Established: 1961
- Abolished: 2008
- Reservation: SC

Balipatna was an Assembly constituency from Khordha district of Odisha. It was established in 1961 and abolished in 2008. After 2008 delimitation, It was subsumed by the Jayadev Assembly constituency. This constituency was reserved for Schedule Castes.

== Elected members ==
Between 1961 & 2008, 11 elections were held.

List of members elected from Balipatna constituency are:

Year	Member	Party
1961	Gopinath Bhoi	Indian National Congress
1967	Harihar Bhoi	Orissa Jana Congress
1971	Basanta Kumar Behera	Indian National Congress
1974	Gopinath Bhoi	Utkal Congress
1977	Gopinath Bhoi	Janata Party
1980	Basant Kumar Behera	Indian National Congress (I)
1985	Raghab Chandra Sethi	Indian National Congress
1990	Hrushikesh Nayak	Janata Dal
1995	Hrushikesh Nayak	Janata Dal
2000	Raghab Chandra Sethy	Biju Janata Dal
2004	Sashi Bhusan Behera	Biju Janata Dal
2009 onwards: See Jayadev
