= Khandapada Assembly constituency =

Constituency of the Odisha legislative assembly in India

Coordinates: 20.27°N 85.17°E

Khandapada
- Constituency No. 120 for the Odisha Legislative Assembly
- Khandapada Assembly constituency in Nayagarh district

Constituency details
- Country: India
- Region: East India
- State: Odisha
- Division: Central Division
- District: Nayagarh
- Lok Sabha constituency: Cuttack
- Established: 1951
- Total electors: 1,85,935 (Note: as on 2024) (Note: as data published by election commission)
- Reservation: None

Member of Legislative Assembly
- 17th Odisha Legislative Assembly
- Incumbent Dusmanta Kumar Swain
- Party: Bharatiya Janta Party
- Elected year: 2024

Khandapada is a Vidhan Sabha constituency of Nayagarh district, Odisha.

This constituency includes Khandapada, Khandapada block and Bhapur block.

== Elected members ==
Vote share of winning candidates
2024	50.72%
2019	74.34%
2014	47.19%
2009	54.71%
2004	31.30%
2000	69.54%
1995	50.86%
1990	64.77%
1985	51.43%
1980	49.24%
1977	42.68%

Since its formation in 1951, 17 elections were held till date.

List of members elected from Khandapada constituency are:

Year	Member	Party
2024	Dusmanta Kumar Swain	Bharatiya Janata Party
2019	Soumya Ranjan Patnaik	Biju Janata Dal
2014	Anubhav Patnaik	Biju Janata Dal
2009	Siddharth Sekhar Singh	Biju Janata Dal
2004	Bijayalaxmi Pattnaik	Independent politician
2000	Bijayalaxmi Pattnaik	Biju Janata Dal
1995	Bibhuti Bhusan Singh Mardaraj	Indian National Congress
1990	Aruna Kumar Pattanaik	Janata Dal
1985	Bibhuti Bhusan Singh Mardaraj	Indian National Congress
1980	Bibhuti Bhusan Singh Mardaraj	Independent politician
1977	Satyasundar Mishra	Independent politician
1974	Satyasundar Mishra	Independent politician
1971	Banshidhar Pattanaik	Indian National Congress (R)
1967	Raja Saheb Harihar Singh Mardaraj Bhramarabara Roy	Indian National Congress
1961	Raja Saheb Harihar Singh Mardaraj Bhramarabara Roy	Indian National Congress
1957	Raja Saheb Harihar Singh Mardaraj Bhramarabara Roy	Indian National Congress
1951	Raja Saheb Harihar Singh Mardaraj Bhramarabara Roy	Independent politician

== Election results ==
=== 2024 ===
Voting were held on 25 May 2024 in 3rd phase of Odisha Assembly Election & 6th phase of Indian General Election. Counting of votes was on 4 June 2024. In 2024 election, Bharatiya Janata Party candidate Dusmanta Kumar Swain defeated Biju Janata Dal candidate Sabitri Pradhan by a margin of 7,343 votes.

2024 Odisha Vidhan Sabha Election, Khandapada
Party	Candidate	Votes	%	±%
BJP	Dusmanta Kumar Swain	75,557	50.72	
BJD	Sabitri Pradhan	68,214	45.79	
Independent	Anubhav Patnaik	1,817	1.22	
INC	Baijayanti Mala Mohanty	1,373	0.92	
NOTA	None of the above	597	0.4	
Majority		7,343	4.93	
Turnout		1,48,964	80.12	
BJP gain from BJD				

=== 2019 ===
In 2019 election, Biju Janata Dal candidate Soumya Ranjan Patnaik defeated Independent candidate Dusmanta Kumar Swain by a margin of 81,430 votes.

2019 Vidhan Sabha Election, Khandapada
Party	Candidate	Votes	%	±%
BJD	Soumya Ranjan Patnaik	100,038	74.34	
Independent	Dusmanta Kumar Swain	18,608	13.83	
BJP	Siddharth Sekhar Singh	14,014	10.41	
NOTA	None of the above	1,020	0.76	
Majority		81,430	60.51	
Turnout		1,34,565	73.67	
BJD hold				

=== 2014 ===
In 2014 election, Biju Janata Dal candidate Anubhav Patnaik defeated Aama Odisha Party candidate Soumya Ranjan Patnaik by a margin of 601 votes.

2014 Vidhan Sabha Election, Khandapada
Party	Candidate	Votes	%	±%
BJD	Anubhav Patnaik	62,257	47.19	▼7.52
AOP	Soumya Ranjan Patnaik	61,656	46.73	−
BJP	Shiba Prasad Bhanja	3,895	2.95	▼0.01
INC	Binodini Mohanty	1,877	1.42	▼38.37
NOTA	None of the above	719	0.54	−
Majority		601	0.45	▼14.47
Turnout		1,31,940	81.07	▲8.39
Registered electors		1,62,747		
BJD hold				

=== 2009 ===
In 2009 general election, Biju Janata Dal candidate Siddharth Sekhar Singh defeated Indian National Congress candidate Soumya Ranjan Patnaik by a margin of 16,814 votes.

2009 Vidhan Sabha Election, Khandapada
Party	Candidate	Votes	%	±%
BJD	Siddharth Sekhar Singh	61,654	54.71	▲27.93
INC	Soumya Ranjan Patnaik	44,840	39.79	▲21.09
BJP	Bijayalaxmi Pattnaik	3,332	2.96	−
Majority		16,814	14.92 (Note: % of total valid votes)	−
Turnout		1,12,696	72.68 (Note: 2004 Voter turnout was 66.96%)	▲5.72
BJD gain from Independent				
