= Sivaji Patnaik =

Indian politician (1930–2022)

Member of Parliament, Lok Sabha
- In office 1977–1980
- Preceded by: Chintamani Panigrahi
- Succeeded by: Chintamani Panigrahi
- Constituency: Bhubaneswar, Odisha
- In office 1989–1996
- Preceded by: Chintamani Panigrahi
- Succeeded by: Soumya Ranjan Patnaik

Personal details
- Born: 10 August 1930 OlaSingh, Khordha District, British Raj
- Died: 23 May 2022 (aged 91) Bhubaneswar, Odisha, India
- Party: Communist Party of India (Marxist)
- Spouse: Pratibha
- Children: Nibedita, Biswajeet, Nachiketa, Geetimaya
- Education: Ravenshaw University

Sivaji Patnaik (10 August 1930 – 23 May 2022) was an Indian politician, belonging to the Communist Party of India (Marxist). He was elected to the Lok Sabha the lower house of Indian Parliament from Bhubaneswar in Odisha.

He died on 23 May 2022 at Bhubaneswar, aged 91.
