= Jayadev Assembly constituency =

Constituency of the Odisha legislative assembly in India

Coordinates: 21.00°N 83.09°E

Jayadev
- Constituency No. 111 for the Odisha Legislative Assembly
- Jayadev Assembly constituency in Khordha district

Constituency details
- Country: India
- Region: East India
- State: Odisha
- Division: Central Division
- District: Khordha
- Lok Sabha constituency: Bhubaneswar
- Established: 2008
- Total electors: 1,83,354 (Note: as on 2024) (Note: as data published by election commission)
- Reservation: SC

Member of Legislative Assembly
- 17th Odisha Legislative Assembly
- Incumbent Naba Kishor Mallick
- Party: Biju Janata Dal
- Elected year: 2024

Jayadev is a Vidhan Sabha constituency of Khordha district, Odisha, India.

This constituency includes Balianta block and Balipatna block.

The constituency was formed in 2008 Delimitation after subsuming Balipatna Assembly constituency and went for polls in 2009 election.

== Elected members ==
Elected members from the Jayadev constituency are:

Year	Member	Party
Before 2009: See Balipatna
2009	Arabinda Dhali	Biju Janata Dal
2014	Shashi Bhusan Behera	Biju Janata Dal
2019	Arabinda Dhali	Biju Janata Dal
2024	Naba Kishor Mallick	Biju Janata Dal

== Election results ==
Vote share of winning candidates
2024	52.02%
2019	44.72%
2014	56.65%
2009	57.47%

=== 2024 ===
Voting were held on 25th May 2024 in 3rd phase of Odisha Assembly Election & 6th phase of Indian General Election. Counting of votes was on 4th June 2024. In 2024 election, Biju Janata Dal candidate Naba Kishor Mallick defeated Bharatiya Janata Party candidate Arabinda Dhali candidate by a margin of 21,473 votes.

2024 Odisha Legislative Assembly election: Jayadev
Party	Candidate	Votes	%	±%
BJD	Naba Kishor Mallick	76,790	52.02	▲7.30
BJP	Arabinda Dhali	55,317	37.47	▲17.03
INC	Krishna Chandra Sagaria	8,277	5.61	
NOTA	None of the above	1,271	0.86	▲0.18
Majority		21,473	14.55	
Turnout		1,47,629	80.52	
BJD hold				

=== 2019 ===
In 2019 election, Biju Janata Dal candidate Arabinda Dhali defeated Independent candidate Naba Kishor Mallick by a margin of 18,700 votes.

2019 Odisha Legislative Assembly election: Jayadev
Party	Candidate	Votes	%	±%
BJD	Arabinda Dhali	63,000	44.72	▼11.93
Independent	Naba Kishor Mallick	44,300	31.45	−
BJP	Narendranath Nayak	28,798	20.44	▲4.16
NOTA	None of the above	964	0.68	
Majority		18,700	13.27	
Turnout		1,40,871	75.55	
BJD hold				

=== 2014 ===
In 2014 election, Biju Janata Dal candidate Shashi Bhusan Behera defeated Indian National Congress candidate Benudhar Bhoi by a margin of 40,951 votes.

2014 Odisha Legislative Assembly election: Jayadev
Party	Candidate	Votes	%	±%
BJD	Shashi Bhusan Behera	69,637	56.65	−
INC	Benudhar Bhoi	28,686	23.34	−
BJP	Basanta Kumar Nayak	20,007	16.28	−
NOTA	None of the above	1,138	0.93	−
Majority		40,951	33.31	
Turnout		1,22,919	73.3	
Registered electors		1,65,515		
BJD hold				

=== 2009 ===
In 2009 election, Biju Janata Dal candidate Arabinda Dhali defeated Independent candidate Narendranath Nayak by a margin of 43,604 votes.

2009 Odisha Legislative Assembly election: Jayadev
Party	Candidate	Votes	%	±%
BJD	Arabinda Dhali	59,888	57.47	−
Independent	Narendranath Nayak	16,284	15.63	−
INC	Nalini Behera	11,786	11.31	−
BJP	Hrusikesha Nayak	10,749	10.31	−
Majority		43,604	41.84 (Note: %of total valid votes)	−
Turnout		1,04,226	65.19	−
Registered electors		1,59,890		
BJD win (new seat)				
