= Arup Patnaik =

Indian police officer (born 1955)

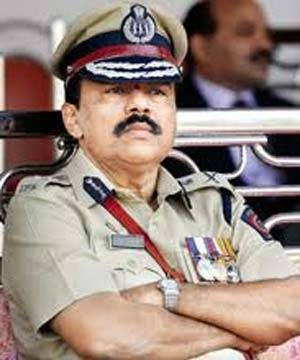
- Born: 8 September 1955 (age 71); Bhubaneswar, Odisha, India
- Education: Mayo College, Delhi University
- Police career
- Country: Indian Police Service
- Department: Mumbai Police
- Service years: 1979–2015
- Awards: President's Police Medal (2003); Indian Police Medal (1994)
- Other work: Convenor, Odisha Mo Parivar & Lok Sabha 2019 Elections BJD Candidate Bhubaneswar Parliamentary Constituency. Managing Trustee, Konark Cancer Foundation.

Arup Patnaik (born 8 September 1955) is a retired Indian Police Service officer who served as the 36th Police Commissioner of Mumbai. He retired on 30 September 2015 after a 36-year career with the Maharashtra Police. He is a recipient of the President's Police Medal for Distinguished Service (2003) and the Indian Police Medal for Meritorious Services (1994).

Patnaik previously served as the Chairman of Odisha's State Youth Welfare Board, holding the rank and status of a minister of state. After his retirement, Arup Patnaik co-founded the Konark Cancer Foundation.

== Early life ==
Patnaik was born on 8 September 1955 in Bhubaneswar, Odisha, in a Karan family. He studied until Class 6 at Pyarimohan Academy in Cuttack before attending Mayo College, Ajmer, where he passed his Indian School Certificate examination in 1971.

He completed his B.Sc. Chemistry honors degree from Delhi University. While pursuing postgraduate studies in chemistry, he joined the State Bank of India as a Probationary Officer in 1976 and worked there until 1979.

== Police career ==
Patnaik joined the Indian Police Service (IPS) in 1979. He was posted as probationary assistant superintendent of police in Nasik from 1981 to 1982 and as Superintendent of Police in Latur from 1983 to 1986. Patnaik was then transferred to Nagpur (1986–1988), followed by a posting as Superintendent of Police in Jalgaon (1988–1991). In Mumbai, he served as Deputy Commissioner of Police Zone VII from March 1991 until March 1994.

He led the investigation into the Bombay riots from 1992 to 1993. He was involved in the 1993 operation at Mumbra that led to the seizure of approximately 1500 kg of RDX. Patnaik went on deputation to the Central Bureau of Investigation in March 1994 and supervised investigations into the Harshad Mehta securities scam. He served as Additional Commissioner of Police for South Mumbai from 1999 to 2001.

Following his promotion to Inspector General of Police, he headed the State Reserve Police Force (SRPF) from 2001 to 2005. He returned to the Mumbai Police as Joint Commissioner of Police, Law & Order (2005–2007). In 2007, Patnaik was promoted to Additional Director-General of Police, Maharashtra, serving from July 2007 to February 2011. From February 2011 to August 2012, Patnaik served as Commissioner of Police, Mumbai.

Patnaik was transferred from his position as Commissioner of Police following the Azad Maidan riots and was succeeded by Satyapal Singh in 2012. Patnaik joined the Biju Janata Dal in 2018. In the 2019 general election, he contested the Bhubaneswar Lok Sabha constituency. The election was won by BJP candidate Aparajita Sarangi. On October 25, 2019, Odisha Chief Minister Naveen Patnaik appointed Arup Patnaik Convenor of the Biju Janata Dal social service wing, 'Odisha Mo Parivar'. On October 30, 2019, Arup Patnaik was inducted as a Co-Opted Member of the House Committee of the Odisha Assembly concerning environmental pollution in the state.

== Personal life ==
Arup Patnaik is married to Vidhurita, a former Senior Executive with Bennett, Coleman and Company Limited (The Times Group). They have two children, Chirantan and Tanmay.

Along with neurosurgeon B. K. Misra and cardiac surgeon Ramakanta Panda, he co-founded the Konark Cancer Foundation. The foundation supports cancer patients undergoing treatment at Tata Memorial Hospital, providing assistance with food, accommodation, and medication.

== In popular culture ==
- Hussain Zaidi's 2002 book, Black Friday, detailed the 1993 Mumbai bombings, which involved 13 explosions and killed 250 people. Zaidi dedicated a chapter to Patnaik's involvement in the post-attack investigation. The book was adapted into a film by Anurag Kashyap, also titled Black Friday, where Sharad Ponkshe played Patnaik.
