= Naba Kishor Mallick =

Indian politician

Member of Odisha Legislative Assembly
- Incumbent
- Assumed office 4 June 2024
- Preceded by: Arabinda Dhali
- Constituency: Jayadev

Personal details
- Party: Biju Janata Dal
- Profession: Politician

Naba Kishor Mallick is an Indian politician. He was elected to the Odisha Legislative Assembly from Jayadev as a member of the Biju Janata Dal.
