= Dusmanta Kumar Swain =

Indian politician

Member of the Odisha Legislative Assembly
- Incumbent
- Assumed office 4 June 2024
- Preceded by: Soumya Ranjan Patnaik
- Constituency: Khandapada

Personal details
- Party: Bharatiya Janata Party
- Profession: Politician

Dusmanta Kumar Swain is an Indian politician. He was elected to the Odisha Legislative Assembly from Khandapad as a member of the Bharatiya Janata Party.
