= Prasanna Kumar Patasani =

Indian politician

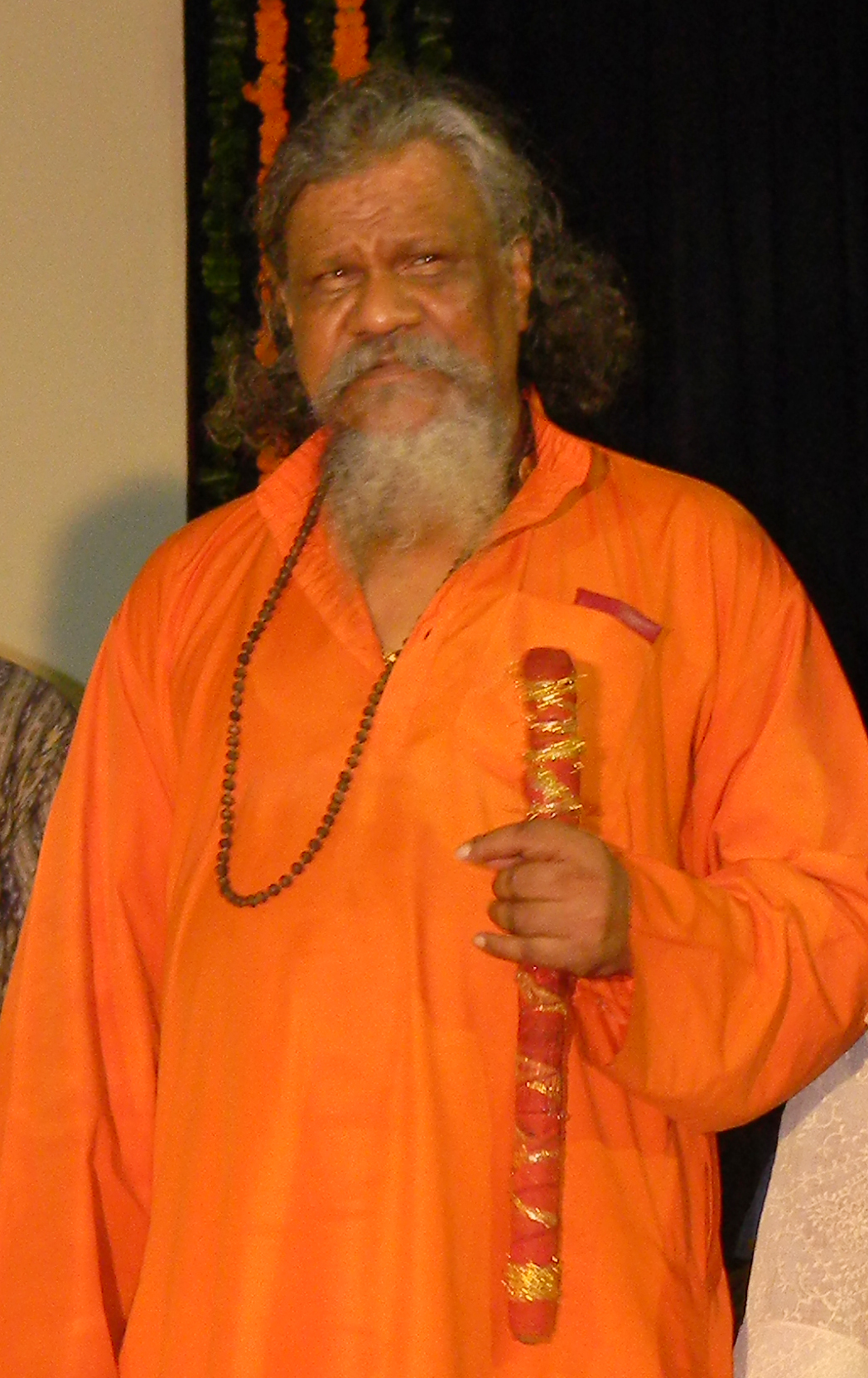

Member: 12th, 13th, 14th, 15th and 16th Lok Sabha
- In office 1998–2019
- Preceded by: Soumya Ranjan Patnaik
- Succeeded by: Aparajita Sarangi
- Constituency: Bhubaneswar

Personal details
- Born: 27 April 1946 (age 80) Khurda, Orissa Province, British India
- Party: Bharatiya Janata Party (2024-present)
- Other political affiliations: Biju Janata Dal (1997-2024)
- Spouse: Bijayalaxmi Patasani
- Children: 2 Sons And 1 Daughter
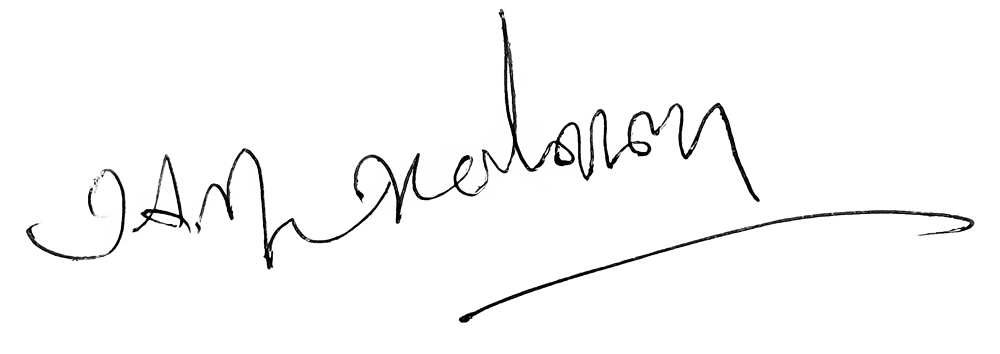
- Signature
- As of 22 September, 2006

Prasanna Kumar Patasani (born 27 April 1946) is an Indian lawyer, philosopher, poet, and former member of Lok Sabha, the lower house of the Indian Parliament. He represented the Bhubaneswar constituency of Odisha from 1998 to 2019. He's elected as a Member of Parliament for five terms. He was the senior vice president and founder member of the Biju Janata Dal.he was working as a Member of State Planning Board, Government of Odisha with a Cabinet Minister status. He is also famous for promoting yoga in India and in international countries. He was the person who started Yoga in India, by doing it in a small village of Odisha. Dr. Prasanna Patasani is one of the few Indian politicians having zero cases registered against him.

== Early life ==
Patasani joined the Maharishi Mahesh Yogi ashram at Rishikesh and went through yoga ashanas trainings. He went to Switzerland to join the ashram of Maharishi Mahesh Yogi's Ashram. In Switzerland he was the student of Maharishi Mahesh Yogi with Ravi Shankar. With the team of Maharishi Mahesh Yogi he travelled extensively worldwide and about one hundred countries. Around 1980's he returned to India and was the founder President of Maharishi College of Natural Law in Bhubaneswar, the state capital of Orissa. Thereafter he actively took part and open around hundreds of institutions, out of which 20-30 institutions are in the name of Patasani and he is the founder father of various educational institutions in the state of Orissa. In 1980s the people of the eastern region used to travel towards the southern states for higher and technical educations, where after upon the active leadership of Prasanna Patasani not only the state of Orissa became the hub of the technical education in the state but also in the entire eastern region Orissa became the hub for the technical education behind almost all the institutions, Prasanna Patasani has played the major role for establishment of such institutions. Apart from the educational institutions, Prasanna Patasani has written many books and poems and film songs besides acting in various movies and songs which were acclaimed not only in the state of Orissa but also spread worldwide.

Prasanna Patasani has been elected for the eighth time (four times as Member of Legislative Assembly and four times as the Member of Parliament from Bhubaneswar the state capital of Orissa). He is a great follower of Shri Biju Patnaik.

Patasani has published 60 books, in different languages, and has written about 100 articles. He has spoken in Japan, US, and UK at Oxford University on "the future of human civilization". He had gone underground for about 12 years to save him from imprisonment on the alleged involvement with the Maoists and their cause. During the period of his underground he joined his guru, Maharishi Mahesh Yogi, who taught him the Patanjali Yoga Sutra, which changed his life. He still carries the "blessing wand" his guru gave him.

== See also ==
- Indian general election, 2014 (Odisha)
- Indian general election, 2009 (Odisha)
