= Aparajita Sarangi =

Indian politician

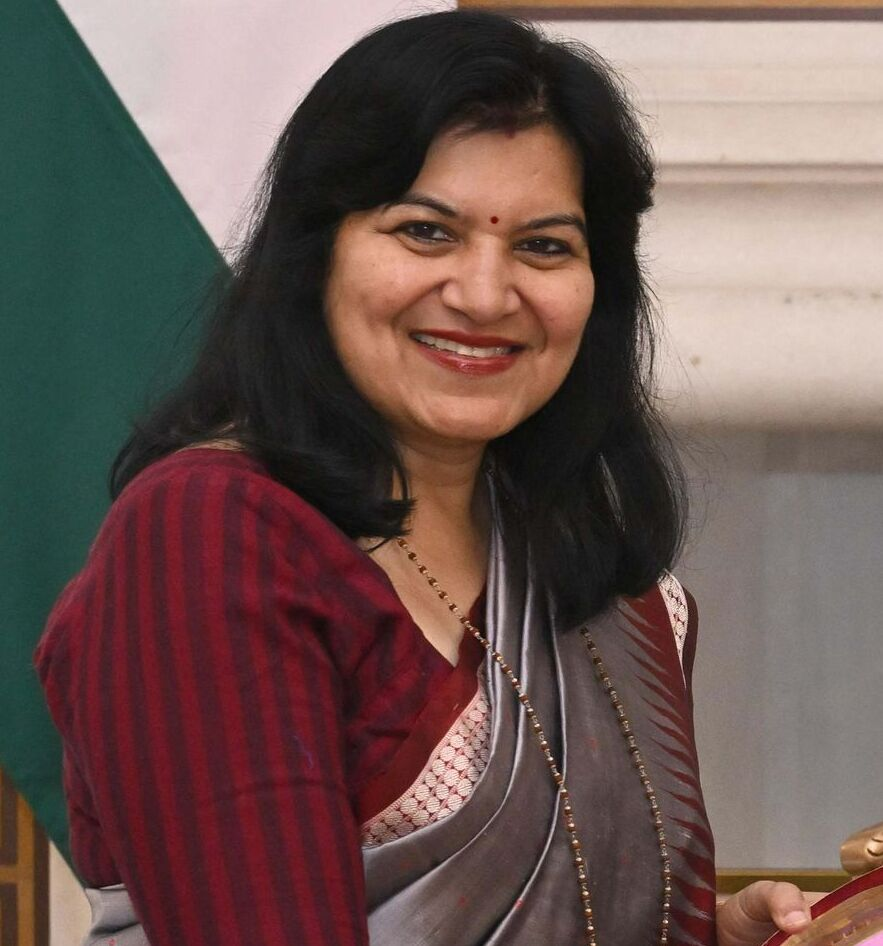
- Sarangi in 2025

Member of Parliament, Lok Sabha
- Incumbent
- Assumed office 25 May 2019
- Preceded by: Prasanna Kumar Patasani
- Constituency: Bhubaneswar

Personal details
- Born: Aparajita Mishra; 8 October 1969 (age 57) Muzaffarpur, Bihar, India
- Party: Bharatiya Janata Party
- Spouse: Santosh Kumar Sarangi
- Children: Archita Sarangi, Shikhar Sarangi
- Occupation: Politician

Aparajita Sarangi (née Mishra; born 8 October 1969) is an Indian politician from the Bharatiya Janata Party and the incumbent Member of Parliament from Bhubaneswar. A former Odisha cadre Indian Administrative Service (IAS) officer of the 1994 batch, Sarangi quit her job and joined the BJP on 27 November 2018 to contest the 2019 Indian general election. She was fielded against Biju Janata Dal's Arup Patnaik.

Sarangi was awarded with the Shakti Samman in 2012. She had last served as the Joint Secretary in the Ministry of Rural Development and has also worked as Bhubaneswar Municipal Commissioner and secretary of the state's mass education department. Her husband, Santosh Sarangi, is also an IAS officer of the same batch.

== Early life and education ==
Aparajita was born to Ajit Mishra and Kusum Mishra in Muzaffarpur district of Bihar on 8 October 1969. Her father Ajit was a professor of English.

She passed matriculation from Mount Carmel School, Bhagalpur, Bihar. She graduated in English (Honours) from S.M. College, Bhagalpur University. She cleared the Civil Services Examination in 1994 at the age of 24.

== Civil service ==
Aparajita joined the Indian Administrative Service from 1994 batch of Odisha cadre.

In 1996 she served as Sub-Collector of three Sub-Divisions and Additional District Magistrate. From 1998 to 2006 she served as Collector and District Magistrate of Nuapada, Koraput, and Bargarh. From 2006 to 2009 she served as the Municipal Commissioner of Bhubaneswar. In 2009 she was appointed Secretary in various departments like School Education, Panchayati Raj and Textile in Government of Odisha. In 2013 she moved to Central government as Joint Secretary for Ministry of Rural Development in the Government of India. She retired as a civil servant in 2018 after taking voluntary retirement.

== Politics ==
After taking retirement as a civil servant, Aparajita Sarangi joined the Bharatiya Janata Party and later contested elections and won.

She was later appointed as member of parliamentary committees. She was also appointed as a spokesperson of the Bharatiya Janata Party.
