= Khandapada =

Town in Nayagarh Odisha, India

- Town
- Location in Odisha, India Khandapada (India)
- Coordinates: 20.27°N 85.18°E
- Country: India
- State: Odisha
- District: Nayagarh

Government
  - MLA: Dusmanta Kumar Swain (BJP)
  - Officers: Anita Panda (OAS), Tahasildar, Khandapada; Sipra Sethi (OAS), BDO, Khandapada; Trupti Mohanty(ORS) Add. Tdl, Khandapada
- Elevation: 65 m (213 ft)

Population (2011)
  - Total: 9,038

Languages
  - Official: Odia
- Time zone: UTC+5:30 (IST)
- PIN: 752077
- Vehicle registration: OD

Khandapada (also spelt as Khandapara) is a town and a Notified Area Council in Nayagarh district in the Indian state of Odisha. It is located in the valley of nine mountains.

== Geography ==
Khandapada is located at 20.27°N 85.18°E. It has an average elevation of 65 m (213 ft).

== History ==
During the British Raj era, Khandapada was the capital of Khandpara State. It was one of several princely states of the Eastern States Agency. The instrument of accession to the Indian Union was signed by the last ruler of the state on 1 January 1948.

== Demographics ==
As of 2001 India census, Khandapada had a population of 8754. Males constitute 52% of the population and females 48%. Khandapada has an average literacy rate of 75%, higher than the national average of 59.5%: male literacy is 82%, and female literacy is 67%. In Khandapada, 12% of the population is under 6 years of age.

== Politics ==
Shri Soumya Ranjan Patnaik is a member of 16th Assembly of Odisha (2019 - 2024) elected from Khandapada assembly constituency.Previously Anubhav Patnaik son of late Arun Pattanaik who won the seat in the state election in 2014. MLA from Khandapada Assembly Constituency is BJD candidate Siddharth Singh, who won the seat in State elections in 2009. Bibhuti Bhushan Singh Mardaraj of INC won this seat in 1995, 1985 and also in 1980 as an independent candidate. Arun Kumar Pattanaik of JD won this seat in 1990 and Satyasundar Mishra won it in 1977 as independent candidate.

Khandapada is now part of Cuttack (Lok Sabha constituency).

== Khandapada Block Panchayat List ==
SL No	Panchayats Name	Villages in	Village Details
1	Badabananpur	14	1.Banapur 2.Banjhapalli 3.Baradakhala 4.Bhramarbar Parasad 5.Chaitanpur 6.Ghanasalia 7.Kotabarkali 8.Kumundi 9.Nayan Sagar 10.Nrusinghapurpatana 11.Pattakukuta 12.Ratanpur 13.Sana Banapur 14.Tankupada
2	Banamalipur	17	1.Bahada 2.Banamalipur 3.Banamalipur Patana 4.Basantapur 5.Basudeipur 6.Jadunathpur 7.Jaganathpur 8.Jalajhari 9.Manikapur 10.Nimapatana 11.Ostia 12.Pathuria 13.Purusottampur 14.Ramachandiprasad 15.Ramachandraprasad 16.Ramachandrapur 17.Udaypur
3	Benagadia	13	1.Barkoli 2.Benagadia 3.Ghodamaridwar 4.Gopinathpur 5.Ijjat Ghodamaridwar 6.Kadua 7.Madhaberani 8.Mareikana 9.Muraripur 10.Pathardwar 11.Patta Barakoli 12.Suliapahad 13.Tentuliapalli
4	Bodasa	5	1.Bodasa 2.Golasahi 3.Gouda Bodasa 4.Padiabhanga(UI) 5.Pana Nuagaon
5	Gadiasahi	8	1.Gadiasahi 2.Kunjabeli 3.Natabarpur Sasan 4.Patharganda 5.Pitamahula 6.Rakesia 7.Sadhuapalli 8.Sarpokhari
6	Gunthuni	3	1.Anlamada 2.Gunthuni 3.Raghunathpur
7	Jagannathprasad	9	1.Darda 2.Gunthuni(2) 3.Hatakata 4.Jagannathprasad 5.Kaduapada 6.Kaduapatana 7.Kuahara 8.Mahulpada 9.Putusahi
8	Jogipalli	9	1.Badahamara 2.Balaspada 3.Budhijhari 4.Jamusahi 5.Jogiapalli 6.Krushnaprasad 7.Laxmiprasad 8.Tangisahinuagaon 9.Tentuliapalli
9	Kantilo	1	1.Kantilo
10	Khalisahi	9	1.Baradabari 2.Basudeipur 3.Girdharpur 4.Ichhapur 5.Khalisahi 6.Kismat Ichhapur 7.Kottapokhari 8.Puania 9.Singhimundia
11	Kiajhara	20	1.Bada Khajuria 2.Badajhad 3.Bhanrapalli 4.Bhodangapalli 5.Budhi Jhanda Sasan 6.Giridipalli 7.Gochhabari 8.Jakelapalli 9.Kiajhara 10.Kiajharpatana 11.Koduanpalli 12.Mangarajpur 13.Manikapur 14.Panaspodar 15.Petapalli 16.SanaKhajuria 17.Satagochhia 18.Serajanga 19.Serenda 20.Takeria
12	Koska	26	1.Ambaatha(Krushnapur) 2.Anlapata 3.Badapokharia 4.Balabhadraprasad 5.Dukhapalli 6.Goudapatana 7.Guriabari 8.Kandhapathara 9.Koska 10.Kusumada 11.Luharkhani 12.Madhupur 13.Nuapada 14.Pankal 15.Pathara 16.Raimba 17.Ramchandrapur 18.Ratakhandi 19.Ratakhandi 20.Ratanpur 21.Rugabadu 22.Sapua 23.Saradhapur 24.Singibari 25.Singipur 26.Solapokhari
13	Kumbharapada	3	1.Jakela 2.Khadagprasad 3.Kumabharpada
14	Maradarajpur	5	1.Chaupalli 2.Giridipatana 3.Harichandanpur 4.Mardarajpur 5.Saljharia
15	Ranichheli	9	1.Gohiriapada 2.Kalapangi 3.Khuntabati 4.Mangalpur 5.Manikpur 6.Mardarajprasad 7.Natabaraprasad 8.Nuagohiriapada 9.Ranichheli
16	Ranipada	5	1.Biridihi 2.Girigiria 3.Gopalipada 4.Ranipada 5.Subalaya
17	Salajharia	5	1.Kaithapalli 2.Kunjabiharipur 3.Kusumitara 4.Sahaspur 5.Salajharia
18	Sidhamula	8	1.Balaramprasad 2.Barapurikia 3.Ghodamaridwar 4.Hatiapalli 5.Kanasingh 6.Nagajha 7.Rajkiari 8.Sidhamula
19	Sikharapur	5	1.Barapalli 2.Gandasahi 4.Sikharpur 5.Ujalanga
20	Singhapada	14	1.Baraganda 2.Bedanki 3.Dattapokhari 4.Hariharprasad 5.Khuntubandha 6.Kismat Baraganda 7.Kunjabihariprasad 8.Kutunisira 9.Nuagaon 10.Nuapalli 11.Rupapalli 12.Sambarbindha 13.Singhapada 14.Tikiribari
	Total Villages	188	
