= Chintamani Panigrahi =

Indian Odia-language writer

5th Governor of Manipur
- In office 10 July 1989 – 19 March 1993
- Chief Minister: Rajkumar Jaichandra Singh; Rajkumar Ranbir Singh; Rajkumar Dorendra Singh
- Preceded by: K. V. Krishna Rao
- Succeeded by: K. V. Raghunatha Reddy

Member of Parliament, Lok Sabha
- In office 1980–1989
- Preceded by: Sivaji Patnaik
- Succeeded by: Sivaji Patnaik
- Constituency: Bhubaneswar
- In office 1967–1977
- Preceded by: Purna Chandra Bhanj Deo
- Succeeded by: Sivaji Patnaik
- Constituency: Bhubaneswar
- In office 1957–1962
- Preceded by: Loknath Mishra
- Succeeded by: B. Mishra
- Constituency: Puri

Personal details
- Born: 22 March 1922 Puri, Bihar and Orissa Province, British India (Now in Odisha, India)
- Died: 29 April 2000 (aged 78) Bhubaneswar, Odisha, India
- Party: Indian National Congress
- Other political affiliations: Communist Party of India
- Education: University of Calcutta

Chintamani Panigrahi (22 March 1922 – 29 April 2000) was an Indian Independence Movement activist, a political and social leader from Odisha. He served as the Governor of Manipur from 1989 to 1993. He was born to Sri Gopinath Panigrahi and Smt Gelhi Devi in Biswanathpur, Puri district, Orissa (India). He was the first cousin of Shri. Bhagawati Charan Panigrahi (the founder of Communist Party in Orissa) and he was the first cousin of Legendary Oriya author Padmabhushan Kalindi Charan Panigrahi. Legendary Iron lady and former Chief Minister of Orissa Smt. Nandini Satpathy was his niece.

== Early life and independence movement ==
He was an active member of the "Bichinna Utkal Abkash Bahini" which was constituted on 17 May 1938 under the chairmanship of Sri Sukanta Rao, then Principal of Ravenshaw Collegiate School. Its aim was protecting the Oriya language and culture in parts of Utkal (Orissa) that were separated in the reorganization of states. They visited Medinipur, Bankura, Singhbhum, Seraikela, Kharsawan, Chainbasa, Chakradharpur, Tarala, Tikili and Manjusha in the summer holidays to interact with people in Oriya and preach national integrity.

In the 9 August 1942 revolution, he and his friends hoisted the Indian National Flag at Ravenshaw College and subsequently took leave of absence from the college. His passion for higher studies and his wish to be a part of the freedom struggle took him to Kolkata, where he got admission into Vidyasagar College under the University of Calcutta to finish his M.A. He joined the Paschim Banga Chhatra Congress and used to write handbills and posters against the British Government at night. On 16 August 1946, there was a massive Hindu-Muslim riot in Bengal. A peace march was organized under the leadership of Sri Panigrahi by Utkal Bahini and medical assistance as well as food was given to the affected, preaching the mantra of "United we win, divided we fall".

== Journalism and politics ==
He was a journalist, an author, a writer and a labour leader. He was the editor of "Daily Prajatantra" (1947–1951) and "Daily Matrubhumi" (1951–1956). He was secretary of the All Utkal Bank Employees Association and became vice-president of the World Democratic Youth Federation. He was elected to the 2nd Lok Sabha in 1957 from Puri constituency as a Communist Party of India candidate. Later, he joined the Indian National Congress. He was re-elected to the Lok Sabha in 1967, 1971, 1980 and 1984 from Bhubaneswar constituency. He was also Minister of State for Home Affairs (1986–88), Minister of State in the Ministry of Defence (1988–89) and Governor of Manipur from 10 July 1989 to 19 March 1993.

There are several works to his credit which include "Juga Sahitya" (Oriya), "Journey through blue mountain" and "With the people". He was fondly called the "People’s Governor" by the residents of Manipur because of his contribution to the development of the state and its people.

He died on 29 April 2000 at the Kalinga Hospital in Bhubaneswar.
