= Arabinda Dhali =

Indian politician

Arabinda Dhali is an Indian politician and a former Member of Legislative assembly, Odisha. He belongs to the Bharatiya Janta Party.

== Political career ==
- Dhali is a sixth-term member of the Odisha Legislative Assembly and represented the Malkangiri from 1992 to 2000 and the Jayadev constituency from 2009 to 2014.
- He was a former transport and corporation minister in BJD-BJP alliance.
- On 30 April 2006, he left BJP to join Bharatiya Janshakti Party.
- On 24 March 2008, he joined the Samajwadi Party.
- In 2019, he joined Biju Janata Dal and won as an MLA from Jayadev Assembly constituency in 2019 Odisha Legislative Assembly election.
- On 3 March 2024, he left BJD and joined Bharatiya Janata Party.
- In 2024 Odisha Legislative Assembly election, he contested for Jayadev assembly segment in Khurda district and lost.
