= Aama Odisha Party =

- Chairman: Soumya Ranjan Patnaik
- Founded: 26 November 2013; 12 years ago
- Headquarters: 185, VIP Colony, IRC Village, Nayapalli, Bhubaneswar
- Ideology: Social democracy
- Colours: Earth Yellow
- ECI Status: State Party
- Alliance: None
- Seats in Rajya Sabha: 0 / 245
- Seats in Lok Sabha: 0 / 543
- Seats in State Legislative Assembly: 0 / 147 (Odisha)

The Aama Odisha Party (AOP) was a state political party of the Indian state of Odisha led by Soumya Ranjan Patnaik. It was founded on 26 November 2013. Aama Odisha Party was allotted pot symbol by the Election Commission of India.

On 22 March 2014, Suparno Satpathy quit the Indian National Congress and joined AOP.

On 5 March 2018, Soumya Ranjan Patnaik merged Aama Odisha Party with Biju Janata Dal and he was nominated by Naveen Patnaik as a BJD MP to Rajya Sabha.
