= Soumya Ranjan Patnaik =

Indian politician and journalist

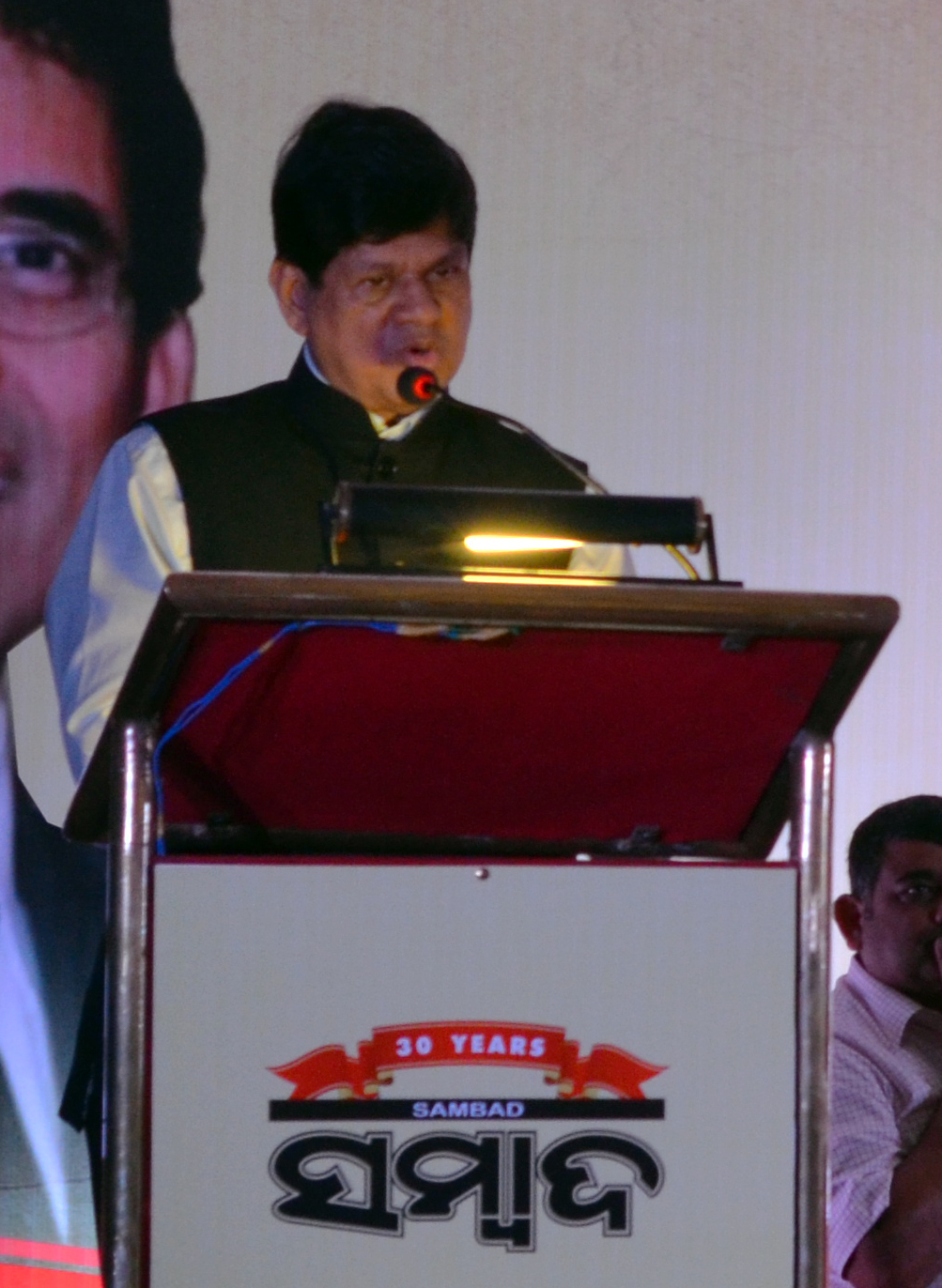

Member of the Odisha Legislative Assembly
- In office 24 May 2019 – 4 June 2024
- Preceded by: Anubhav Patnaik
- Succeeded by: Dusmanta Kumar Swain
- Constituency: Khandapada

Member of Parliament, Rajya Sabha
- In office 4 April 2018 – 4 April 2019
- Preceded by: Ananga Udaya Singh Deo
- Succeeded by: Achyuta Samanta

Member of Parliament, 11th Lok Sabha
- In office 1 June 1996 – 4 December 1997
- Preceded by: Sivaji Patnaik
- Succeeded by: Prasanna Kumar Patasani
- Constituency: Bhubaneswar

Personal details
- Born: 18 August 1952 (age 74) Anandapur, Kendujhar, Odisha, India
- Party: Independent
- Other political affiliations: Indian National Congress; Bharatiya Janata Party; Aama Odisha Party; Biju Janata Dal
- Spouse: Sudatta Patnaik
- Children: Tallina Patnaik; Tanaya Patnaik
- Relatives: Niranjan Patnaik (brother); Janaki Ballabh Patnaik (father-in-law); Jayanti Patnaik (mother-in-law)
- Education: Ravenshaw University; Utkal University; Banaras Hindu University
- Profession: Politician, journalist, media baron, film producer
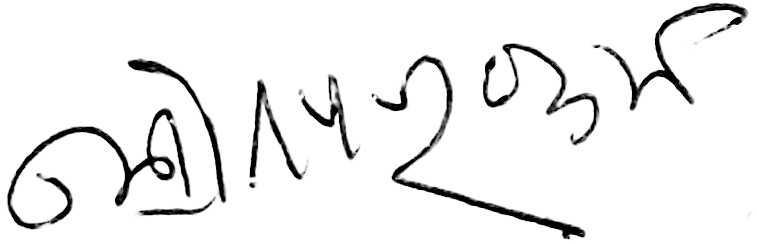
- Signature
- Website: soumyapatnaik.in

Soumya Ranjan Patnaik (born 18 August 1952) is an Indian politician, veteran journalist, and media entrepreneur from Odisha. He is the founder and editor-in-chief of Sambad, the largest-circulated Odia daily newspaper, as well as a feature film producer and successful business personality.

Patnaik has served in various legislative roles across his career, including as a Member of Parliament in both the 11th Lok Sabha (1996–1997) and the Rajya Sabha (2018–2019), and as a Member of the Odisha Legislative Assembly representing the Khandapada constituency from 2019 to 2024. He is part of a prominent political family, being the son-in-law of former Odisha Chief Minister Janaki Ballabh Patnaik.

== Early life and education ==
Patnaik was born on 18 August 1952 in Anandapur in the Kendujhar district of Odisha into a prominent Karan family. He completed his foundational education locally before pursuing higher studies at Ravenshaw University (then Ravenshaw College) and graduating from Utkal University. He later attended Banaras Hindu University (BHU), where he earned his postgraduate degree.

== Political career ==
Patnaik began his active political career with the Indian National Congress. He contested and was successfully elected to the 11th Lok Sabha from the Bhubaneswar constituency in 1996. Following internal party disputes, he was expelled from the Congress in October 2013, after which he floated his own regional political outfit called the Aama Odisha Party (AOP).

On 6 March 2018, Patnaik merged the Aama Odisha Party into the ruling Biju Janata Dal (BJD). The same day, he was nominated by BJD president Naveen Patnaik to the Rajya Sabha, representing Odisha. He resigned his Rajya Sabha seat the following year to contest the 2019 Odisha Legislative Assembly election, winning the Khandapada constituency by the highest victory margin recorded in that state election cycle.

In September 2023, following a series of critical signed editorial columns in his newspaper Sambad questioning the functioning and governance style of the state administration, Patnaik was removed from his post as BJD vice president and subsequently expelled from the party on allegations of anti-party activities.

== Media and filmography ==
Aside from his political career, Patnaik is a dominant figure in Odisha's media ecosystem. Through his conglomerate, Eastern Media Limited, he operates the Odia language daily Sambad and the major regional television news channel Kanak News. He is also a regular columnist, writing the widely read op-ed series "Ama Gharara Halchal".

As a feature film producer, Patnaik has backed several major cinematic releases in the Odia and Hindi industries:

Year	Film	Language	As Producer	As Writer	Director
2005	Babu I Love You	Odia	Yes	Yes	Sanjay Nayak
2007	To Pain Nebi Mu Sahe Janama	Odia	Yes	No	Sanjay Nayak
2008	Chaati Chiri Dele Tu	Odia	Yes	No	S.K. Muralidharan
2008	Nei Jaa Re Megha Mate	Odia	Yes	No	S.K. Muralidharan
2009	Suna Chadhei Mo Rupa Chadhei	Odia	Yes	Yes	Himanshu Parija
2010	Tu Thile Mo Dara Kahaku	Odia	Yes	No	Dilip Panda
2013	Mo Duniya Tu Hi Tu	Odia	Yes	No	Sudhakar Basanta
2013	Shivalika	Hindi	Yes	No	Biman Sengupta & Bhagabat Kar
2014	Tu Aau Mu	Odia	Yes	No	Nishikant Dalabehera
2018	Downup The Exit 796	Hindi	Yes	No	Jaimin Bal

== Personal life ==
Patnaik is married to Sudatta Patnaik, the daughter of the former Chief Minister of Odisha, Janaki Ballabh Patnaik, and veteran member of parliament Jayanti Patnaik. The couple has two daughters, Tallina Patnaik and Tanaya Patnaik. His elder brother, Niranjan Patnaik, is a senior politician who previously served as the president of the Odisha Pradesh Congress Committee.
