= 2000 Orissa Legislative Assembly election =

- 17 & 22 February 2000

All 147 seats in the Orissa Legislative Assembly 74 seats needed for a majority
- Registered: 2,41,88,320 (▲9.57%)
- Turnout: 59.10% (▼14.54pp)
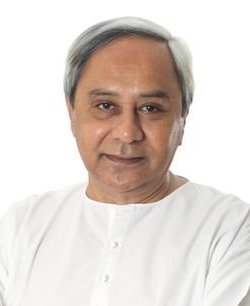

	Majority party	Minority party	Third party
Leader	Naveen Pattanaik		Hemananda Biswal
Party	BJD	BJP	INC
Alliance	NDA	NDA
Leader's seat	Hinjili		Laikera
Seats before	New	9	80
Seats won	68	38	26
Seat change	New	▲29	▼54
Popular vote	29.40%	18.20%	33.78%
CM before election
Hemananda Biswal
INC
Elected CM
Naveen Patnaik
Biju Janata Dal (NDA)

Elections to the Orissa Legislative Assembly were held in February 2000 to elect members of the 147 constituencies in Orissa, India. The BJP and BJD fought election together as NDA. The National Democratic Alliance won the most seats and Naveen Pattanaik was appointed as the Chief Minister of Orissa. The number of constituencies was set as 147 by the recommendation of the Delimitation Commission of India.

== Parties and alliances ==
=== National Democratic Alliance ===
As per prepoll alliance, seats where divided into 4:3 ratio.

Party	Flag	Symbol	Leader	Contesting Seats
Biju Janata Dal			Naveen Patnaik	84
Bharatiya Janata Party			Jual Oram	63

=== United Progressive Alliance ===
Party	Flag	Symbol	Leader	Contesting Seats
Indian National Congress			Hemananda Biswal	145

=== Others ===
Party	Flag	Symbol	Contesting Seats
Trinamool Congress			36
Communist Party of India			29
Communist Party of India (Marxist)			15
Janata Dal (Secular)			24
Jharkhand Mukti Morcha			21

== List of Candidates ==
Constituency		NDA		INC	
#	Name	Party	Candidate	Party	Candidate
1	Karanjia (ST)	BJD	Raghunath Hembram	INC	Sukanti Nayak
2	Jashipur (ST)	BJP	Bhanu Charan Naik	INC	Sudhir Chandra Naik
3	Bahalda (ST)	BJP	Laxman Soren	INC	Saiba Sushil Kumar Hansdah
4	Rairangpur (ST)	BJP	Droupadi Murmu	INC	Laxman Majhi
5	Bangriposi (ST)	BJD	Chaitanya Prasad Majhi	INC	Gouri Naik
6	Kuliana (ST)	BJP	Sananda Marndi	INC	Baidyanath Singh
7	Baripada	BJP	Bimal Lochan Das	INC	Dinakrushna
8	Baisinga (ST)	BJP	Kandra Soren	INC	Kuanria Majhi
9	Khunta (ST)	BJP	Golak Naik	INC	Saraswati Hembram
10	Udala (ST)	BJP	Bhaskar Madhei	INC	Rabaneswar Madhei
11	Bhograi	BJD	Dr. Kamala Das	INC	Kartikeswar Patra
12	Jaleswar	BJP	Aswini Patra	INC	Jayanarayan Mohanty
13	Basta	BJD	Raghunath Mohanty	INC	Debiprasanna Chand
14	Balasore	BJP	Jiban Pradip Dash	INC	Gopanarayan Das
15	Soro	BJP	Sk. Salimuddin Mohammed	INC	Kartik Mohapatra
16	Simulia	BJD	Parsuram Panigrahi	INC	Padma Lochan Panda
17	Nilgiri	BJP	Shyamananda Mohapatra	INC	Sukumar Nayak
18	Bhandaripokhari (SC)	BJD	Ratha Das	INC	Kumar Sree Chiranjibi
19	Bhadrak	BJD	Prafulla Samal	INC	Biren Palei
20	Dhamnagar	BJP	Manmohan Samal	INC	Jagannath Rout
21	Chandbali (SC)	BJP	Bishnu Charan Sethi	INC	Netrananda Mallick
22	Basudevpur	BJD	Bijayshree Routray	INC	Meenakshee Nayak
23	Sukinda	BJD	Prafulla Chandra Ghadai	INC	Jayakrishna Behura
24	Korai	BJP	Sanchita Mohanty		
25	Jajpur (SC)	BJD	Suryamani Jena	INC	Amiya Kanta Mallick
26	Dharamsala	BJD	Kalpataru Das	INC	Kangali Charan Panda
27	Barchana	BJD	Amar Prasad Satpathy	INC	Sitakanta Mohapatra
28	Bari-Derabisi	BJD	Debasis Nayak	INC	Kulamani Rout
29	Binjharpur (SC)	BJD	Pramila Mallik	INC	Anadi Charan Das
30	Aul	BJD	Pratap Keshari Deb	INC	Dolagovinda Nayak
31	Patamundai (SC)	BJD	Tapash Kumar Das	INC	Ganeswar Behera
32	Rajnagar	BJD	Nalini Kant Mohanty	INC	Bijay Pradhan
33	Kendrapara	BJP	Bed Prakash Agarwalla	INC	Bhagabat Prasad Mohanty
34	Patkura	BJD	Atanu Sabyasachi Nayak	INC	Umakanta Nayak
35	Tirtol	BJD	Debashish Samantaray	INC	Basanta Kumar Biswal
36	Ersama	BJD	Damodar Rout	INC	Bijay Kumar Nayak
37	Balikuda	BJD	Raghunandan Das	INC	Umesh Chandra Swain
38	Jagatsinghpur (SC)	BJD	Bishnu Charan Das	INC	Arakhita Bhoi
39	Kissannagar	BJD	Pratap Jena	INC	Bira Kishore Parida
40	Mahanga	BJD	Sarat Kumar Kar	INC	Sk. Matlub Ali
41	Salepur (SC)	BJD	Kalandi Behera	INC	Prakash Chandra Behera
42	Gobindpur	BJD	Panchanan Kanungo	INC	Rabindra Kumar Mallick
43	Cuttack Sadar	BJP	Nibedita Pradhan	INC	Bijaylakshmi Sahoo
44	Cuttack City	BJP	Samir Dey	INC	Syed Mustafiz Ahmed
45	Choudwar	BJD	Rajkishore Ram	INC	Kailash Chandra Baral
46	Banki	BJD	Pravat Tripathy	INC	Debasis Patnaik
47	Athgarh	BJD	Ranendra Pratap Swain	INC	Janaki Ballav Patnaik
48	Baramba	BJD	Debi Mishra	INC	Laxmi Devi
49	Balipatna (SC)	BJD	Raghab Chandra Sethi	INC	Benudhar Bhoi
50	Bhubaneswar	BJP	Biswabhusan Harichandan	INC	Dr. Jagannath Mohapatra
51	Jatni	BJD	Sarat Paikray	INC	Suresh Kumar Routray
52	Pipli	BJD	Pradeep Maharathy	INC	Yudhistir Samantaray
53	Nimapara (SC)	BJP	Baidhar Malik	INC	Rabindra Kumar Sethy
54	Kakatpur	BJD	Surendra Nath Naik	INC	Satyabrata Patra
55	Satyabadi	BJD	Chandramadhab Mishra	INC	Prasad Kumar Harichandan
56	Puri	BJD	Maheswar Mohanty	INC	Bipin Dash
57	Brahmagiri	BJD	Ajaya Jena	INC	Lalatendu Bidyadhar Mohapatra
58	Chilka	BJP	Bibhuti Bhusan Harichandan	INC	Debendranath Mansingh
59	Khurda	BJD	Minati Harichandan	INC	Dillip Srichandan
60	Begunia	BJP	Prashanta Nanda	INC	Kailash Chandra Mohapatra
61	Ranpur	BJP	Surama Padhy	INC	Ramakanta Mishra
62	Nayagarh	BJD	Bhagabat Behera	INC	Sitakanta Mishra
63	Khandapara	BJD	Bijayalaxmi Pattnaik	INC	Bibhuti Bhusan Singh Mardaraj
64	Daspalla	BJP	Sukanta Kumara Panigrahi	INC	Harihar Karan
65	Jaganathprasad (SC)	BJD	Madhaba Nando Behera	INC	Simanchala Behera
66	Bhanjanagar	BJD	Bikram Keshari Arukha	INC	B. Dandpani Patro
67	Suruda	BJP	Ananta Narayan Singh Deo	INC	Usha Rani Panda
68	Aska	BJD	Debaraj Mohanty	INC	Uma Charan Bisoyi
69	Kavisuryanagar	BJD	Ladu Kishore Swain	INC	Govinda Chandra Bisoyi
70	Kodala	BJD	Rama Krushna Patnaik	INC	Udayanath Pradhan
71	Khallikote	BJD	V. Sugnana Kumari Deo	INC	Trinath Samantara
72	Chatrapur	BJP	Rama Chandra Panda	INC	Daniel Das
73	Hinjili	BJD	Naveen Patnaik	INC	Udayanath Nayak
74	Gopalpur (SC)	BJD	Rama Chandra Sethy	INC	Trinath Behera
75	Berhampur	BJD	Ramesh Ch. Chyau Patnaik	INC	Bikram Kumar Panda
76	Chikati	BJD	Usha Devi	INC	Chintamani Dyan Samantara
77	Mohana	BJD	Surjya Narayana Patro	INC	Prasanta Chandra Swain
78	Ramagiri (ST)	BJP	Bharat Paik	INC	Haladhar Karji
79	Parlakhemundi	BJP	Venkata Ramana	INC	Trinath Sahu
80	Gunupur (ST)	BJP	Ramurty Gamango	INC	Bhagirathi Gomango
81	Bissam-Cuttack (ST)	BJD	Sarangadhar Kadraka	INC	Dambarudhar Ulaka
82	Rayagada (ST)	BJD	Lalbihari Himirika	INC	Ulaka Ramachandra
83	Lakshmipur (ST)	BJD	Bibhisana Majhi	INC	Gaura Chandra Muduli
84	Pottangi (ST)	BJD	Jayaram Pangi	INC	Rama Chandra Kadam
85	Koraput	BJD	Iswar Chandra Panigrahi	INC	Tara Prasad Bahinipati
86	Malkangiri (SC)	BJP	Arabinda Dhali	INC	Nimai Chandra Sarkar
87	Chitrakonda (ST)	BJP	Gangadhar Nayak	INC	Mamta Madhi
88	Kotpad (ST)	BJP	Sadan Naik	INC	Basudev Majhi
89	Jeypore	BJD	Rabi Narayan Nanda	INC	Gupta Prasad Das
90	Nowrangpur	BJP	Subas Chandra Dash	INC	Habibulla Khan
91	Kodinga (ST)	BJP	Domburu Majhi	INC	Sadan Nayak
92	Dabugam (ST)	BJD	Bhagaban Majhi	INC	Bhujabal Majhi
93	Umarkote (ST)	BJP	Dharmu Gond	INC	Parama Pujari
94	Nawapara	BJP	Basanta Kumar Panda	INC	Prem Kumar Azad
95	Khariar	BJD	Durjyodhan Majhi	INC	Rajshree Debi
96	Dharamgarh (SC)	BJD	Bira Sipka	INC	Bharat Bemal
97	Koksara	BJD	Roshni Singh Deo	INC	Sunil Chandra Nayak
98	Junagarh	BJP	Himanshu Shekhar Meher	INC	Bhupinder Singh
99	Bhawanipatna (SC)	BJP	Pradipta Kumar Naik	INC	Dusmanta Naik
100	Narla (ST)	BJD	Balabhadra Majhi	INC	Kumar Mani Sabar
101	Kesinga	BJP	Dhaneswar Majhi	INC	Jaganath Pattanaik
102	Balliguda (ST)	BJP	Surendra Kanhar	INC	Sahura Mallik
103	Udayagiri (ST)	BJD	Saluga Pradhan	INC	Nagarjun Pradhan
104	Phulbani (SC)	BJD	Bishnu Priya Behera	INC	Abhimanyu Behera
105	Boudh	BJD	Satchidananda Dalal	INC	Sujit Kumar Padhi
106	Titilagarh (SC)	BJD	Jogendra Behera	INC	Dambarudhar Chhatria
107	Kantabanji	BJP	Subash Chandra Agrawal	INC	Santosh Singh Saluja
108	Patnagarh	BJP	Kanak Vardhan Singh Deo	INC	Rajani Prusty
109	Saintala	BJD	Jagneswar	INC	Surendra Singh Bhoi
110	Loisingha	BJP	Bal Gopal Mishra		
111	Bolangir	BJD	Anang Udaya Singh Deo	INC	Md. Muzafar Hussain Khan
112	Sonepur (SC)	BJD	Kunduru Kushal	INC	Achyutananda Biswal
113	Binka	BJD	Niranjan Pujari	INC	Banamali Hota
114	Birmaharajpur	BJD	Baishnaba Padhan	INC	Rama Chandra Pradhan
115	Athmallik	BJD	Nagendra Kumar Pradhan	INC	Amarnath Pradhan
116	Angul	BJD	Adwait Prasad Singh	INC	Ramesh Jena
117	Hindol (SC)	BJD	Anjali Behera	INC	Maheswar Naik
118	Dhenkanal	BJP	Krushna Chandra Patra	INC	Nabin Chandra Narayan Das
119	Gondia	BJD	Nabin Nanda	INC	Sidheswari Prasad Mishra
120	Kamakhyanagar	BJD	Brahmananda Biswal	INC	Premalata Mohapatra
121	Pallahara	BJP	Dharmendra Pradhan	INC	Durga Prasad Sahoo
122	Talcher (SC)	BJP	Mahesh Sahoo	INC	Arjun Behera
123	Padampur	BJD	Bijaya Singh Bariha	INC	Satya Bhusan Sahu
124	Melchhamunda	BJP	Sirish Kumar Bohidar	INC	Prakash Chandra Debta
125	Bijepur	BJD	Ashok Kumar Panigrahy	INC	Ripu Nath Seth
126	Bhatli (SC)	BJP	Bimbadhar Kuanr	INC	Mohan Nag
127	Bargarh	BJD	Ananda Acharya	INC	Nabin Kumar Padhan
128	Sambalpur	BJP	Jaya Narayan Mishra	INC	Anand Jena
129	Brajarajnagar	BJP	Suresh Pujari	INC	Anup Kumar Sai
130	Jharsuguda	BJD	Kishore Kumar Mohanty	INC	Birendra Chandra Pandey
131	Laikera (ST)	BJP	Brundaban Majhi	INC	Hemanand Biswal
132	Kuchinda (ST)	BJP	Rabinarayan Naik	INC	Panu Chandra Nayak
133	Rairakhol (SC)	BJD	Durjodhan Sohela	INC	Abhimanyu Kumar
134	Deogarh	BJP	Subash Chandra Panigrahi	INC	Indukanta Pradhan
135	Sundargarh	BJP	Shankarsan Naik	INC	Kishore Chandra Patel
136	Talsara (ST)	BJP	Indramani Kalo	INC	Gajadhar Majhi
137	Rajgangpur (ST)	BJD	Mangala Kisan	INC	Damayanti Roudia
138	Biramitrapur (ST)	BJP	Sukdev Pradhan	INC	Remis Kerketta
139	Rourkela	BJD	Ajit Das	INC	Pravat Mohapatra
140	Raghunathpali (ST)	BJP	Shankar Oram	INC	Anil Minz
141	Bonai (ST)	BJP	Dayanidhi Kisan	INC	Janardan Dehury
142	Champua (ST)	BJP	Harihar Soren	INC	Madhaba Sardar
143	Patna (ST)	BJP	Gourahari Naik	INC	Mansingh Munda
144	Keonjhar (ST)	BJP	Mohan Charan Majhi	INC	Jagadish Naik
145	Telkoi (ST)	BJD	Niladri Nayak	INC	Prana Ballav Nayak
146	Ramchandrapur	BJP	Sri Akshya Mishra	INC	Sri Niranjan Patnaik
147	Anandapur (SC)	BJP	Sri Mayadhar Jena	INC	Sri Jayadev Jena

== Results ==
Party	Votes	%	+/–	Seats	+/–
Indian National Congress	4,770,654	33.78	–5.30	26	+12
Biju Janata Dal	4,151,895	29.40	New	68	New
Bharatiya Janata Party	2,570,074	18.20	+10.32	38	+12
Jharkhand Mukti Morcha	301,729	2.14	+0.20	3	–1
Communist Party of India	172,398	1.22	–0.49	1	Steady
Bahujan Samaj Party	162,184	1.15	+0.65	0	0
Janata Dal (Secular)	118,978	0.84	New	1	New
Trinamool Congress	110,056	0.78	New	1	New
Communist Party of India (Marxist)	109,256	0.77	+0.11	1	+1
Janata Dal (United)	48,135	0.34	New	0	New
Nationalist Congress Party	34,986	0.25	New	0	New
Samajwadi Party	20,480	0.14	New	0	New
Shiv Sena	18,794	0.13	New	0	New
Bharipa Bahujan Mahasangh	6,815	0.05	New	0	New
Communist Party of India (Marxist–Leninist) Liberation	4,198	0.03	–0.02	0	0
Samata Party	3,732	0.03	–0.29	0	0
Samajwadi Janata Party (Rashtriya)	3,051	0.02	–1.34	0	0
Samajwadi Jan Parishad	2,412	0.02	New	0	New
Rashtriya Janata Dal	2,078	0.01	New	0	New
Bira Oriya Party	1,520	0.01	New	0	New
Proutist Sarva Samaj Samiti	1,341	0.01	–0.05	0	0
Jharkhand Party	1,209	0.01	–0.03	0	0
All India Forward Bloc	795	0.01	+0.01	0	0
Odisha Communist Party	630	0.00	–0.16	0	0
Ajeya Bharat Party	559	0.00	New	0	New
Revolutionary Socialist Party	294	0.00	New	0	New
Independents	1,506,216	10.66	+0.15	8	+2
Total	14,124,469	100.00	–	147	0
Valid votes	14,124,469	98.81			
Invalid/blank votes	170,284	1.19			
Total votes	14,294,753	100.00			
Registered voters/turnout	24,188,320	59.10			
Source: Election Commission of India

=== District wise results ===
District	Seats					
District	Seats	BJD	BJP	INC	IND	OTH
Mayurbhanj	10	—N/a	6	—N/a	2	2
Balasore	7	3	1	2	—N/a	1
Bhadrak	5	2	1	1	1	—N/a
Jajpur	7	6	—N/a	—N/a	—N/a	1
Kendrapara	5	3	1	—N/a	—N/a	1
Jagatsinghpur	4	3	—N/a	1	—N/a	—N/a
Cuttack	10	7	2	—N/a	1	—N/a
Khurda	6	1	3	1	1	—N/a
Puri	6	3	1	2	—N/a	—N/a
Nayagarh	4	2	—N/a	2	—N/a	—N/a
Ganjam	12	8	1	2	—N/a	1
Gajapati	3	1	—N/a	2	—N/a	—N/a
Rayagada	3	2	1	—N/a	—N/a	—N/a
Koraput	5	3	—N/a	2	—N/a	—N/a
Malkangiri	2	—N/a	1	1	—N/a	—N/a
Nowrangpur	4	—N/a	—N/a	4	—N/a	—N/a
Nawapara	2	1	1	—N/a	—N/a	—N/a
Kalahandi	6	3	3	—N/a	—N/a	—N/a
Kandhamal	3	2	1	—N/a	—N/a	—N/a
Boudh	1	—N/a	—N/a	—N/a	1	—N/a
Balangir	6	2	2	2	—N/a	—N/a
Subarnapur	3	3	—N/a	—N/a	—N/a	—N/a
Angul	5	3	2	—N/a	—N/a	—N/a
Dhenkanal	3	2	1	—N/a	—N/a	—N/a
Bargarh	5	3	1	1	—N/a	—N/a
Sambalpur	3	1	2	—N/a	—N/a	—N/a
Jharsuguda	3	1	—N/a	2	—N/a	—N/a
Deogarh	1	—N/a	1	—N/a	—N/a	—N/a
Sundergarh	7	2	3	1	—N/a	1
Keonjhar	6	1	3	—N/a	2	—N/a
Total	147	68	38	26	8	7

== Elected members ==
District	AC. No.	Constituency	Member	Party
Mayurbhanj	1	Karanjia (ST)	Padma Charan Haiburu	Independent
Mayurbhanj	2	Jashipur (ST)	Bhanu Charan Naik	Bharatiya Janata Party
Mayurbhanj	3	Bahalda (ST)	Laxman Soren	Bharatiya Janata Party
Mayurbhanj	4	Rairangpur (ST)	Droupadi Murmu	Bharatiya Janata Party
Mayurbhanj	5	Bangriposi (ST)	Purusottama Naik	Independent
Mayurbhanj	6	Kuliana (ST)	Sudam Marndi	Jharkhand Mukti Morcha
Mayurbhanj	7	Baripada	Kishore Dash	Jharkhand Mukti Morcha
Mayurbhanj	8	Baisinga (ST)	Kandra Soren	Bharatiya Janata Party
Mayurbhanj	9	Khunta (ST)	Golak Bihari Naik	Bharatiya Janata Party
Mayurbhanj	10	Udala (ST)	Bhaskara Madhei	Bharatiya Janata Party
Balasore	11	Bhograi	Kamala Das	Biju Janata Dal
Balasore	12	Jaleswar	Jayanarayan Mohanty	Indian National Congress
Balasore	13	Basta	Raghunath Mohanty	Biju Janata Dal
Balasore	14	Balasore	Jiban Pradip Dash	Bharatiya Janata Party
Balasore	15	Soro	Kartik Mohapatra	Indian National Congress
Balasore	16	Simulia	Parsuram Panigrahi	Biju Janata Dal
Balasore	17	Nilgiri	Pradipta Panda	Communist Party of India (Marxist)
Bhadrak	18	Bhandaripokhari (SC)	Ratha Das	Biju Janata Dal
Bhadrak	19	Bhadrak	Biren Palei	Indian National Congress
Bhadrak	20	Dhamnagar	Manas Ranjan Mallik	Independent
Bhadrak	21	Chandbali (SC)	Bishnu Charan Sethi	Bharatiya Janata Party
Bhadrak	22	Basudevpur	Bijayshree Routray	Biju Janata Dal
Jajpur	23	Sukinda	Prafulla Chandra Ghadai	Biju Janata Dal
Jajpur	24	Korai	Ashok Kumar Das	Janata Dal (Secular)
Jajpur	25	Jajpur (SC)	Surjyamani Jena	Biju Janata Dal
Jajpur	26	Dharamsala	Kalpataru Das	Biju Janata Dal
Jajpur	27	Barchana	Amar Prasad Satpathy	Biju Janata Dal
Jajpur	28	Bari-Derabisi	Debasis Nayak	Biju Janata Dal
Jajpur	29	Binjharpur (SC)	Pramila Mallik	Biju Janata Dal
Kendrapara	30	Aul	Pratap Keshari Deb	Biju Janata Dal
Kendrapara	31	Patamundai (SC)	Tapash Kumar Das	Biju Janata Dal
Kendrapara	32	Rajnagar	Nalini Kanta Mohanty	Biju Janata Dal
Kendrapara	33	Kendrapara	Bed Prakash Agarwal	Bharatiya Janata Party
Kendrapara	34	Patkura	Trilochan Behera	All India Trinamool Congress
Jagatsinghpur	35	Tirtol	Debashish Samantaray	Biju Janata Dal
Jagatsinghpur	36	Ersama	Damodar Rout	Biju Janata Dal
Jagatsinghpur	37	Balikuda	Umesh Chandra Swain	Indian National Congress
Jagatsinghpur	38	Jagatsinghpur (SC)	Bishnu Charan Das	Biju Janata Dal
Cuttack	39	Kissannagar	Pratap Jena	Biju Janata Dal
Cuttack	40	Mahanga	Sarat Kumar Kar	Biju Janata Dal
Cuttack	41	Salepur (SC)	Kalindi Behera	Biju Janata Dal
Cuttack	42	Gobindpur	Panchanan Kanungo	Biju Janata Dal
Cuttack	43	Cuttack Sadar	Nibedita Pradhan	Bharatiya Janata Party
Cuttack	44	Cuttack City	Samir Dey	Bharatiya Janata Party
Cuttack	45	Choudwar	Bidhubhusan Praharaj	Independent
Cuttack	46	Banki	Pravat Tripathy	Biju Janata Dal
Cuttack	47	Athgarh	Ranendra Pratap Swain	Biju Janata Dal
Cuttack	48	Baramba	Debi Prasad Mishra	Biju Janata Dal
Khurda	49	Balipatna (SC)	Raghaba Chandra Sethi	Biju Janata Dal
Khurda	50	Bhubaneswar	Biswabhusan Harichandan	Bharatiya Janata Party
Khurda	51	Jatni	Suresh Kumar Routray	Indian National Congress
Puri	52	Pipli	Pradeep Maharathy	Biju Janata Dal
Puri	53	Nimapara (SC)	Baidhar Malik	Bharatiya Janata Party
Puri	54	Kakatpur	Surendra Nath Naik	Biju Janata Dal
Puri	55	Satyabadi	Prasad Kumar Harichandan	Indian National Congress
Puri	56	Puri	Maheswar Mohanty	Biju Janata Dal
Puri	57	Brahmagiri	Lalatendu Bidyadhar Mohapatra	Indian National Congress
Khurda	58	Chilka	Bibhuti Bhusan Harichandan	Bharatiya Janata Party
Khurda	59	Khurda	Jyotirindra Nath Mitra	Independent
Khurda	60	Begunia	Prashanta Nanda	Bharatiya Janata Party
Nayagarh	61	Ranpur	Ramakanta Mishra	Indian National Congress
Nayagarh	62	Nayagarh	Bhagabat Behera	Biju Janata Dal
Nayagarh	63	Khandapara	Bijayalaxmi Pattnaik	Biju Janata Dal
Nayagarh	64	Daspalla	Hariharan Karan	Indian National Congress
Ganjam	65	Jaganathprasad (SC)	Simanchala Behera	Indian National Congress
Ganjam	66	Bhanjanagar	Bikram Keshari Arukha	Biju Janata Dal
Ganjam	67	Suruda	Usha Rani Panda	Indian National Congress
Ganjam	68	Aska	Debaraj Mohanty	Biju Janata Dal
Ganjam	69	Kavisuryanagar	Nityananda Pradhan	Communist Party of India
Ganjam	70	Kodala	Ram Krushna Patnaik	Biju Janata Dal
Ganjam	71	Khallikote	V. Sugnana Kumari Deo	Biju Janata Dal
Ganjam	72	Chatrapur	Rama Chandra Panda	Bharatiya Janata Party
Ganjam	73	Hinjili	Naveen Patnaik	Biju Janata Dal
Ganjam	74	Gopalpur (SC)	Rama Chandra Sethy	Biju Janata Dal
Ganjam	75	Berhampur	Ramesh Chandra Chyau Patnaik	Biju Janata Dal
Ganjam	76	Chikiti	Usha Devi	Biju Janata Dal
Gajapati	77	Mohana	Surjya Narayan Patro	Biju Janata Dal
Gajapati	78	Ramagiri (ST)	Haladhar Karji	Indian National Congress
Gajapati	79	Parlakhemundi	Trinath Sahu	Indian National Congress
Rayagada	80	Gunupur (ST)	Rammurthy Gamango	Bharatiya Janata Party
Rayagada	81	Bissam-cuttack (ST)	Sarangadhar Kadraka	Biju Janata Dal
Rayagada	82	Rayagada (ST)	Lal Bihari Himirika	Biju Janata Dal
Koraput	83	Lakshmipur (ST)	Bibhisana Majhi	Biju Janata Dal
Koraput	84	Pottangi (ST)	Jayaram Pangi	Biju Janata Dal
Koraput	85	Koraput	Tara Prasad Bahinipati	Indian National Congress
Malkangiri	86	Malkangiri (SC)	Arabinda Dhali	Bharatiya Janata Party
Malkangiri	87	Chitrakonda (ST)	Mamta Madhi	Indian National Congress
Koraput	88	Kotpad (ST)	Basudev Majhi	Indian National Congress
Koraput	89	Jeypore	Rabi Narayan Nanda	Biju Janata Dal
Nowrangpur	90	Nowrangpur	Habibulla Khan	Indian National Congress
Nowrangpur	91	Kodinga (ST)	Sadan Nayak	Indian National Congress
Nowrangpur	92	Dabugam (ST)	Bhujabal Majhi	Indian National Congress
Nowrangpur	93	Umarkote (ST)	Parama Pujari	Indian National Congress
Nawapara	94	Nawapara	Basanta Kumar Panda	Bharatiya Janata Party
Nawapara	95	Khariar	Duryodhan Majhi	Biju Janata Dal
Kalahandi	96	Dharamgarh (SC)	Bira Sipka	Biju Janata Dal
Kalahandi	97	Koksara	Rosni Singh Deo	Biju Janata Dal
Kalahandi	98	Junagarh	Himansu Sekhar Meher	Bharatiya Janata Party
Kalahandi	99	Bhawanipatna (SC)	Pradipta Kumar Naik	Bharatiya Janata Party
Kalahandi	100	Narla (ST)	Balabhadra Majhi	Biju Janata Dal
Kalahandi	101	Kesinga	Dhaneswar Majhi	Bharatiya Janata Party
Kandhamal	102	Balliguda (ST)	Surendra Kanhar	Bharatiya Janata Party
Kandhamal	103	Udayagiri (ST)	Saluga Pradhan	Biju Janata Dal
Kandhamal	104	Phulbani (SC)	Bishnu Priya Behera	Biju Janata Dal
Boudh	105	Boudh	Pradip Kumar Amat	Independent
Balangir	106	Titilagarh (SC)	Jogendra Behera	Biju Janata Dal
Balangir	107	Kantabanji	Santosh Singh Saluja	Indian National Congress
Balangir	108	Patnagarh	Kanak Vardhan Singh Deo	Bharatiya Janata Party
Balangir	109	Saintala	Surendra Singh Bhoi	Indian National Congress
Balangir	110	Loisingha	Balgopal Mishra	Bharatiya Janata Party
Balangir	111	Bolangir	Ananga Udaya Singh Deo	Biju Janata Dal
Subarnapur	112	Sonepur (SC)	Kunduru Kushal	Biju Janata Dal
Subarnapur	113	Binka	Niranjan Pujari	Biju Janata Dal
Subarnapur	114	Birmaharajpur	Baishnaba Padhan	Biju Janata Dal
Angul	115	Athmallik	Nagendra Kumar Pradhan	Biju Janata Dal
Angul	116	Angul	Adwait Prasad Singh	Biju Janata Dal
Dhenkanal	117	Hindol (SC)	Anjali Behera	Biju Janata Dal
Dhenkanal	118	Dhenkanal	Krushna Chandra Patra	Bharatiya Janata Party
Dhenkanal	119	Gondia	Nabin Nanda	Biju Janata Dal
Angul	120	Kamakhyanagar	Brahmananda Biswal	Biju Janata Dal
Angul	121	Pallahara	Dharmendra Pradhan	Bharatiya Janata Party
Angul	122	Talcher (SC)	Mahesh Sahoo	Bharatiya Janata Party
Bargarh	123	Padampur	Bijaya Ranjan Singh Bariha	Biju Janata Dal
Bargarh	124	Melchhamunda	Prakash Chandra Debta	Indian National Congress
Bargarh	125	Bijepur	Ashok Kumar Panigrahy	Biju Janata Dal
Bargarh	126	Bhatli (SC)	Bimbadhar Kuanr	Bharatiya Janata Party
Bargarh	127	Bargarh	Ananda Acharya	Biju Janata Dal
Sambalpur	128	Sambalpur	Jayanarayan Mishra	Bharatiya Janata Party
Jharsuguda	129	Brajarajnagar	Anup Kumar Sai	Indian National Congress
Jharsuguda	130	Jharsuguda	Kishore Kumar Mohanty	Biju Janata Dal
Jharsuguda	131	Laikera (ST)	Hemananda Biswal	Indian National Congress
Sambalpur	132	Kuchinda (ST)	Rabi Narayan Naik	Bharatiya Janata Party
Sambalpur	133	Rairakhol (SC)	Durjodhan Sohela	Biju Janata Dal
Deogarh	134	Deogarh	Subash Chandra Panigrahi	Bharatiya Janata Party
Sundergarh	135	Sundargarh	Shankarsan Naik	Bharatiya Janata Party
Sundergarh	136	Talsara (ST)	Gajadhar Majhi	Indian National Congress
Sundergarh	137	Rajgangpur (ST)	Mangala Kisan	Biju Janata Dal
Sundergarh	138	Biramitrapur (ST)	George Tirkey	Jharkhand Mukti Morcha
Sundergarh	139	Rourkela	Ajit Das	Biju Janata Dal
Sundergarh	140	Raghunathpali (ST)	Shankar Oram	Bharatiya Janata Party
Sundergarh	141	Bonai (ST)	Dayanidhi Kisan	Bharatiya Janata Party
Keonjhar	142	Champua (ST)	Saharai Oram	Independent
Keonjhar	143	Patna	Gourahari Naik	Bharatiya Janata Party
Keonjhar	144	Keonjhar (ST)	Mohan Charan Majhi	Bharatiya Janata Party
Keonjhar	145	Telkoi (ST)	Niladri Nayak	Biju Janata Dal
Keonjhar	146	Ramchandrapur	Badri Narayan Patra	Independent
Keonjhar	147	Anandapur (SC)	Mayadhar Jena	Bharatiya Janata Party

== Analysis & Govt Formation ==
Due to poor handling of 1999 Odisha cyclone and rise in corruption & criminal cases etc. led to rise of unpopularity of Congress, which eventually led to their dismissal performance in 2000 election.

Chief Minister Naveen Patnaik along with 14 Cabinet Ministers, 6 Minister of State with Independent Charges and 4 Minister of State were administered the oath of office and secrecy by Governor M. M. Rajendran at the Raj Bhavan, Bhubaneswar on 5 March 2000. The BJD had the larger share of representation in the ministry with 16 ministers including the Chief Minister while the BJP had 9.

== See also ==
- List of constituencies of the Odisha Legislative Assembly
- 2000 elections in India
