= Kalahandi Lok Sabha constituency =

Lok Sabha Constituency in Odisha

Coordinates: 19.871834°N 83.102733°E

Kalahandi OD-08
- Lok Sabha constituency
- Interactive Map Outlining Kalahandi Lok Sabha constituency

Constituency details
- Country: India
- Region: East India
- State: Odisha
- Assembly constituencies: Nuapada; Khariar; Lanjigarh; Junagarh; Dharmgarh; Bhawanipatna; Narla
- Established: 1952
- Total electors: 17,02,038 (Note: as on 2024) (Note: as data published by election commission)
- Reservation: None

Member of Parliament
- 18th Lok Sabha
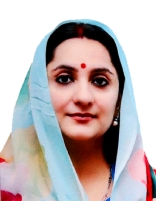
- Incumbent Malvika Devi
- Party: BJP
- Elected year: 2024

Kalahandi Lok Sabha constituency is one of the 21 Lok Sabha (parliamentary) constituencies in Orissa state in eastern India.

== Assembly Segments ==
Before delimitation in 2008, the legislative assembly segments, which constituted this parliamentary constituency were: Khariar, Dharamgarh, Koksara, Junagarh, Bhawanipatna, Narla and Kesinga.

Following delimitation, this constituency currently comprises the following legislative assembly segments:

#	Name	District	Member	Party	Leading (in 2024)
71	Nuapada	Nuapada	Jay Dholakia	BJP	BJP
72	Khariar	Nuapada	Adhiraj Mohan Panigrahi	BJD	BJD
77	Lanjigarh (ST)	Kalahandi	Pradip Kumar Dishari	BJD	BJD
78	Junagarh	Kalahandi	Dibya Shankar Mishra	BJD	BJP
79	Dharmgarh	Kalahandi	Sudhir Ranjan Pattjoshi	BJP	BJP
80	Bhawanipatna (SC)	Kalahandi	Sagar Charan Das	INC	BJP
81	Narla	Kalahandi	Manorama Mohanty	BJD	BJP

== Elected Members ==
Vote share of winning candidates
2024	38.74%
2019	35.18%
2014	25.16%
2009	28.25%
2004	47.35%
1999	57.89%
1998	56.55%
1996	35.15%
1991	30.65%
1989	46.57%
1984	47.6%
1980	51.16%
1977	64.6%
1971	56.88%

Since its formation in 1952, 16 elections have been held till date. It was a two member constituency for 1952 & 1957

List of members elected from Kalahandi constituency are

Year	Member	Party
As Kalahandi Balangir Constituency
1952 (Note: It was a 2 member constituency)	Girdhari Bhoi	AIGP
1952	Rajendra Narayan Singh Deo	AIGP
As Kalahandi Constituency
1957 (Note: It was a 2 member constituency)	Bijaya Chandra Pradhan	AIGP
1957	Pratap Keshari Deo	AIGP
1962	Pratap Keshari Deo	AIGP
1967	Pratap Keshari Deo	SWA
1971	Pratap Keshari Deo	SWA
1977	Pratap Keshari Deo	Independent
1980	Rasa Behari Behara	Indian National Congress (I)
1984	Jagannath Patnaik	INC
1989	Bhakta Charan Das	JD
1991	Subhash Chandra Nayak	INC
1996	Bhakta Charan Das	SAP
1998	Bikram Keshari Deo	BJP
1999	Bikram Keshari Deo	BJP
2004	Bikram Keshari Deo	BJP
2009	Bhakta Charan Das	INC
2014	Arka Keshari Deo	BJD
2019	Basanta Kumar Panda	BJP
2024	Malvika Devi	BJP

== Election results ==
=== 2024 ===
Voting were held on 13th May 2024 in 4th phase of Indian General Election. Counting of votes was on 4th June 2024. In 2024 election, Bharatiya Janata Party candidate Malvika Devi defeated Biju Janata Dal candidate Lambodhar Nial by a margin of 1,33,813 votes.

2024 Indian general election: Kalahandi
Party	Candidate	Votes	%	±%
BJP	Malvika Devi	544,303	40.79	▲5.53
BJD	Lambodhar Nial	4,10,490	30.77	▼2.31
INC	Droupadi Majhi	3,03,199	22.72	▼3.27
NOTA	None of the above	19,715	1.48	
Majority		1,33,813	10.02	
Turnout		13,38,480	78.64	▲2.23
BJP hold				

=== 2019 ===
In 2019 election, Bharatiya Janata Party candidate Basanta Kumar Panda defeated Biju Janata Dal candidate Puspendra Singhdeo by a margin of 26,814 votes.

2019 Indian general elections: Kalahandi
Party	Candidate	Votes	%	±%
BJP	Basanta Kumar Panda	433,073	35.26	▲7.12
BJD	Puspendra Singhdeo	4,06,260	33.08	▼0.11
INC	Bhakta Charan Das	3,19,202	25.99	▼1.57
NOTA	None of the above	21,199	1.73	
BMP	Kamalini Yadav	15,864	1.29	
API	Chhabilal Nial	12,409	1.01	
BSP	Premananda Bag	10,448	0.85	
Majority		26,814	2.18	
Turnout		12,30,929	76.41	
BJP gain from BJD				

=== 2014 ===
In 2014 election, Biju Janata Dal candidate Arka Keshari Deo defeated Bharatiya Janata Party candidate Pradeep Kumar Naik by a margin of 56,347 votes.

2014 Indian general elections: Kalahandi
Party	Candidate	Votes	%	±%
BJD	Arka Keshari Deo	370,871	33.19	−
BJP	Pradeep Kumar Naik	3,14,524	28.14	−
INC	Bhakta Charan Das	3,07,967	27.56	−
NOTA	None of the above	20,880	1.87	−
SP	Siba Hati	18,869	1.69	−
BSP	Saroj Kumar Naik	14,115	1.26	−
Majority		56,347	5.04	−
Turnout		11,17,831	75.83	
Registered electors		14,74,135		
BJD gain from INC				

=== 2009 ===
In 2014 election, Indian National Congress candidate Bhakta Charan Das defeated Biju Janata Dal candidate Subash Chandra Nayak by a margin of 1,54,037 votes.

2009 Indian general elections: Kalahandi
Party	Candidate	Votes	%	±%
INC	Bhakta Charan Das	401,736	28.25	
BJD	Subash Chandra Nayak	2,47,699	17.42	
BJP	Bikram Keshari Deo	2,21,851	15.6	
Majority		1,54,037	10.83	
Turnout		9,79,000	68.85	
INC gain from BJP				
