= Dhenkanal Assembly constituency =

Constituency of the Odisha legislative assembly in India

Coordinates: 20.65°N 85.59°E

Dhenkanal
- Constituency No. 55 for the Odisha Legislative Assembly

Constituency details
- Country: India
- Region: East India
- State: Odisha
- Division: Northern Division
- District: Dhenkanal
- Lok Sabha constituency: Dhenkanal
- Established: 1951
- Total electors: 2,71,942 (Note: as on 2024) (Note: as data published by election commission)
- Reservation: None

Member of Legislative Assembly
- 17th Odisha Legislative Assembly
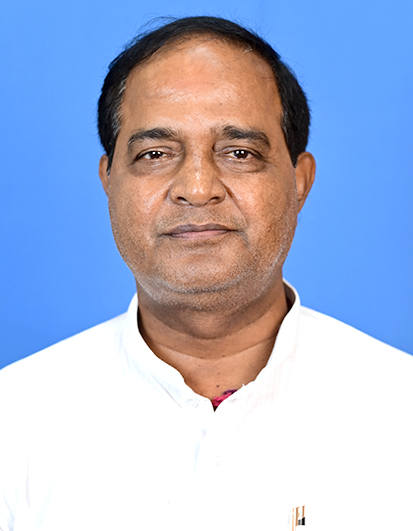
- Incumbent Krushna Chandra Patra
- Party: Bhartiya Janta Party
- Elected year: 2024

Dhenkanal is a Vidhan Sabha constituency of Dhenkanal district, Odisha. After 2008 delimitation, Gondia, Odisha Assembly constituency was subsumed into this constituency.

This constituency includes Dhenkanal, Gondia block and 20 GPs (Baladiabandha, Baliamba, Beltikiri, Bhaliabolkateni, Bhapur, Chandrasekhar Prasad, Dhirapatana, Gobindpur, Kaimati, Kakudibhag, Kankadahad, Kankadpal, Madhusahupatna, Mangalpur, Manipur, Nadiali, Nagiapasi, Sankarpur, Saptasajya and Talabarkote) of Dhenkanal block.

== Elected members ==
Vote share of winning candidates
2024	52.57%
2019	46.92%
2014	39.39%
2009	35.28%
2004	49.17%
2000	34.59%
1995	52.61%
1990	47.49%
1985	64.09%
1980	59.11%
1977	80.07%

Since its formation in 1951, 17 elections have been held till date. It was a 2 member constituency in 1957.

List of members elected from Dhenkanal constituency are:

Year	Member	Party
2024	Krushna Chandra Patra	Bharatiya Janata Party
2019	Sudhir Kumar Samal	Biju Janata Dal
2014	Saroj Kumar Samal	Biju Janata Dal
2009	Nabin Nanda	Nationalist Congress Party
2004	Sudhir Kumar Samal	Indian National Congress
2000	Krushna Chandra Patra	Bharatiya Janata Party
1995	Nabin Chandra Narayan Das	Indian National Congress
1990	Tathagata Satapathy	Janata Dal
1985	Nandini Satpathy	Independent politician
1980	Nandini Satpathy	Indian National Congress (Urs)
1977	Nandini Satpathy	Janata Party
1974	Nandini Satpathy	Indian National Congress
1971	Surendra Mohan Patnaik	Indian National Congress (R)
1967	Ratnaprava Devi	Swatantra Party
1961	Ratnaprava Devi	Swatantra Party
1957 (Note: It was a 2 member constituency)	Kalia Dehuri	Ganatantra Parishad
1957	Shankar Pratap Singh Deo Mahendra Bahadur Raja	Ganatantra Parishad
1951	Baisnab Charan Patnaik	Communist Party of India

== Election results ==
=== 2024 ===
Voting was held on 25 May 2024 in the 3rd phase of the Odisha Assembly Election & 6th phase of the Indian General Election. The counting of votes was on 4 June 2024. In 2024 election, Bharatiya Janata Party candidate Krushna Chandra Patra defeated Biju Janata Dal candidate Sudhir Kumar Samal by a margin of 20,439 votes.

2024 Odisha Vidhan Sabha Election, Dhenkanal
Party	Candidate	Votes	%	±%
BJP	Krushna Chandra Patra	1,06,529	52.57	
BJD	Sudhir Kumar Samal	86,090	42.48	
INC	Susmita Singh Deo	4,630	2.28	
NOTA	None of the above	1,983	0.98	
Majority		20,439	10.09	
Turnout		2,02,637	74.51	
BJP gain from BJD				

=== 2019 ===
In 2019 election, Biju Janata Dal candidate Sudhir Kumar Samal defeated Bharatiya Janata Party candidate Krushna Chandra Patra by a margin of 20,640 votes.

2019 Odisha Legislative Assembly election: Dhenkanal
Party	Candidate	Votes	%	±%
BJD	Sudhir Kumar Samal	89,536	46.92	
BJP	Krushna Chandra Patra	68896	36.11	
INC	Nabin Nanda	24788	12.99	
NOTA	None of the above	1265	0.66	
Majority		20,640	10.81	
Turnout		190810	74.9	
BJD hold				

=== 2014 ===
In 2014 election, Biju Janata Dal candidate Saroj Kumar Samal defeated Bharatiya Janata Party candidate Krushna Chandra Patra by a margin of 3,294 votes.

2014 Vidhan Sabha Election, Dhenkanal
Party	Candidate	Votes	%	±%
BJD	Saroj Kumar Samal	69,083	39.39	new
BJP	Krushna Chandra Patra	65,789	37.52	▲9.2
INC	Sidheswari Prasad Mishra	30,571	17.43	▼13.07
NOTA	None of the above	2,036	1.16	
Majority		3,294	1.88	
Turnout		1,75,360	76.74	12.16
Registered electors		2,28,498		
BJD gain from NCP				

=== 2009 ===
In 2009 election, Nationalist Congress Party candidate Nabin Nanda defeated Indian National Congress candidate Sudhir Kumar Samal by a margin of 6,933 votes.

2009 Vidhan Sabha Election, Dhenkanal
Party	Candidate	Votes	%	±%
NCP	Nabin Nanda	51,118	35.28	−
INC	Sudhir Kumar Samal	44,185	30.50	−
BJP	Krushna Chandra Patra	41,032	28.32	−
Majority		6,933	4.79 (Note: %of total valid votes)	−
Turnout		1,44,914	64.58	−
Registered electors		2,24,399		
NCP gain from INC				
