= Bhawanipatna Assembly constituency =

Constituency of the Odisha legislative assembly in India

Coordinates: 19.91°N 83.16°E

Bhawanipatana
- Constituency No. 80 for the Odisha Legislative Assembly

Constituency details
- Country: India
- Region: East India
- State: Odisha
- Division: Southern Division
- District: Kalahandi
- Lok Sabha constituency: Kalahandi
- Established: 1951
- Total electors: 2,34,424 (Note: as on 2024) (Note: as data published by election commission)
- Reservation: SC

Member of Legislative Assembly
- 17th Odisha Legislative Assembly
- Incumbent Sagar Charan Das
- Party: Indian National Congress
- Elected year: 2024

Bhawanipatana (Odia: ଭବାନୀପାଟଣା) is a Bidhan Sabha constituency of Kalahandi district, Odisha. After 2008 Delimitation, Kesinga Assembly constituency was subsumed into this constituency.

This constituency includes the district HQ town Bhawanipatna, Kesinga, 25 Gram panchayats (Madiguda, Chahagaon, Karlapada, Chheliamal, Kalam, Karlaguda, Thuapadar, Dadpur, Deypur, Gudialipadar, Kamthana, Kuliamal, Gand-Barajhola, Medinipur, Seinpur, Palsijharan, Udepur, Matia, Borda, Kendupati, Gurujung, Borbhata, Dumuria, Artal and Palana) of Bhawanipatna block and 17GPs (Adhamunda, Balsi, Boria, Chancher, Deogaon, Fatakmal, Gaigaon, Gokuleswar, Kandel, Kikia, Kundabandha, Laitara, Nasigaon, Pastikudi, Patharla, Sirol and Utkela) of Kesinga block.

== Elected members ==
Vote share of winning candidates
| 2024 | 37.39% |
| 2019 | 38.00% |
| 2014 | 43.36% |
| 2009 | 36.47% |
| 2004 | 49.24% |
| 2000 | 55.91% |
| 1995 | 23.94% |
| 1990 | 49.33% |
| 1985 | 45.51% |
| 1980 | 71.99% |
| 1977 | 52.67% |

Since its formation in 1951, 18 elections were held till date including in one bypoll in 1957. It was a 2 member constituency for 1952 & 1957.

List of members elected from Bhawanipatna constituency are:

| Year | Member | Party |
|---|---|---|
| 2024 | Sagar Charan Das | Indian National Congress |
| 2019 | Pradipta Kumar Naik | Bharatiya Janata Party |
| 2014 | Anam Naik | Biju Janata Dal |
| 2009 | Dusmanta Naik | Indian National Congress |
| 2004 | Pradipta Kumar Naik | Bharatiya Janata Party |
| 2000 | Pradipta Kumar Naik | Bharatiya Janata Party |
| 1995 | Pradipta Kumar Naik | Bharatiya Janata Party |
| 1990 | Ajit Das | Janata Dal |
| 1985 | Bhakta Charan Das | Janata Party |
| 1980 | Dayanidhi Naik | Indian National Congress (I) |
| 1977 | Dayanidhi Naik | Indian National Congress |
| 1974 | Jagamohan Nayak | Swatantra Party |
| 1971 | Dayanidhi Naik | Swatantra Party |
| 1967 | Dayanidhi Naik | Swatantra Party |
| 1961 | Anchal Majhi | Swatantra Party |
| 1957 (bypoll) (Note: Resignation of Pratap Keshari Deo on his election to Lok Sabha) | Chandra Sekhar Pradhan | Ganatantra Parishad |
| 1957 (Note: It was a 2 member constituency) | Karunakar Bhoi | Ganatantra Parishad |
| 1957 | Pratap Keshari Deo | Ganatantra Parishad |
| 1951 (Note: It was a 2 member constituency) | Janardan Majhi | Ganatantra Parishad |
| 1951 | Jogesh Chandra Singh Deo | Ganatantra Parishad |

== Election results ==
=== 2024 ===
Voting were held on 13 May 2024 in 1st phase of Odisha Assembly Election & 4th phase of Indian General Election. Counting of votes was on 4 June 2024. In 2024 election, Indian National Congress candidate Sagar Charan Das defeated Bharatiya Janata Party candidate Pradipta Kumar Naik by a margin of 13,741 votes.

2024 Odisha Vidhan Sabha Election, Bhawanipatna
| Party | Candidate | Votes | % | ±% |
|---|---|---|---|---|
| INC | Sagar Charan Das | 67,085 | 37.39 | ▲15.39 |
| BJP | Pradipta Kumar Naik | 53,344 | 29.73 | ▼8.27 |
| BJD | Latika Naik | 50,897 | 28.37 | ▼6.63 |
| NOTA | None of the above | 1,469 | 0.82 | |
| Majority | | 13,741 | 7.63 | |
| Turnout | | 1,79,420 | 76.54 | |
| INC gain from BJP | | | | |

=== 2019 ===
In 2019 election, Bharatiya Janata Party candidate Pradipta Kumar Naik defeated Biju Janata Dal candidate Dusmanta Naik by a margin of 4,684 votes.

2019 Odisha Legislative Assembly election: Bhawanipatna
| Party | Candidate | Votes | % | ±% |
|---|---|---|---|---|
| BJP | Pradipta Kumar Naik | 63,063 | 38.00 | |
| BJD | Dusmanta Naik | 58,379 | 35.00 | |
| INC | Sagar Charan Das | 35494 | 22.00 | |
| NOTA | None of the above | 1,743 | 1.06 | |
| Majority | | 4,684 | 3.00 | |
| Turnout | | 1,64,611 | 71.81 | |
| BJP gain from BJD | | | | |

=== 2014 ===
In 2014 election, Biju Janata Dal candidate Anam Naik defeated Indian National Congress candidate Dusmanta Naik by a margin of 10,814 votes.

2014 Odisha Legislative Assembly election, Bhawanipatna
| Party | Candidate | Votes | % | ±% |
|---|---|---|---|---|
| BJD | Anam Naik | 54,825 | 43.26 | |
| INC | Dusmanta Naik | 44,011 | 34.73 | |
| BJP | Dayanidhi Naik | 32,449 | 25.60 | |
| NOTA | None of the above | 1,083 | 0.73 | |
| Majority | | 10,814 | 8.53 | |
| Turnout | | 149261 | 72.46 | |
| BJD gain from INC | | | | |

=== 2009 ===
In 2009 election, Indian National Congress candidate Dusmanta Naik defeated Bharatiya Janata Party candidate Pradipta Kumar Naik by a margin of 2,195 votes.

2009 Odisha Legislative Assembly election, Bhawanipatna
| Party | Candidate | Votes | % | ±% |
|---|---|---|---|---|
| INC | Dusmanta Naik | 46,215 | 36.47 | ▼4.92 |
| BJP | Pradipta Kumar Naik | 44,020 | 34.73 | ▼14.51 |
| BJD | Jayanta Kumar Naik | 25,733 | 20.30 | new |
| Majority | | 2,195 | 1.73 (Note: %of total valid votes) | − |
| Turnout | | 1,26,809 | 64.33 | − |
| INC gain from BJP | | Swing | 0.97 (Note: 2004 Voter turnout was 63.36%) | |
