= Kapil Narayan Tiwari =

Indian activist and politician (1929–2022)

Member of the Orissa Legislative Assembly
- In office 1977–1980
- Preceded by: Anupa Singh Deo
- Succeeded by: Anupa Singh Deo
- Constituency: Khariar

Personal details
- Born: 4 June 1929 Khariar, Madras Presidency, British Raj
- Died: 21 September 2022 (aged 93) Khariar, Odisha, India
- Party: Independent; Indian National Congress (I); Bharatiya Janata Party
- Spouse: R. P. Devi
- Children: 2
- Education: Sambalpur University; Rajendra University

Kapil Narayan Tiwari (4 June 1929 – 21 September 2022) was an Indian activist and politician who served in the Orissa Legislative Assembly from 1977 to 1980, representing the Khariar Assembly constituency. Initially elected as an independent, Tiwari joined the Indian National Congress (I) during his tenure in the assembly.

== Biography ==
=== Education and activism ===
Kapil Narayan Tiwari was born on 4 June 1929 in the town of Khariar, then part of the British Raj. After graduating from Raja Artatran High School, Tiwari began attending Sambalpur University in the late 1940s, where he became a student leader, serving as vice president of the students' union from 1948 to 1949. He then began attending Rajendra University, where he was president of the students' union from 1951 to 1952.

In the 1960s, Tiwari, who was described as being "an ardent follower of Ram Manohar Lohia", became an activist. In 1965, Tiwari and MP Kishen Pattnaik filed a public interest litigation with the Supreme Court of India, requesting greater resources to deal with a drought in the Kalahandi and Nuapada districts, which forced the government to institute several special developmental projects in the area. Tiwari also organized relief centers for people affected by the drought. In 1974, he created the Rairakhol Bhimabhoi Krushak Sangharsa Samiti, an activist group affiliated with the National Alliance of People's Movements.

=== Political career ===
Tiwari made his first run for the Orissa Legislative Assembly in the 1974 election, campaigning for the Khariar constituency as an independent candidate. Tiwari was defeated, placing fourth with 8% of the vote. In the 1977 Orissa Legislative Assembly election, Tiwari again ran as an independent for the Khariar constituency, winning with 56% of the vote. Tiwari was regarded as a leader in the socialist movement during his time in the assembly, and he raised awareness of issues such as child trafficking, poverty, starvation, and migration. Tiwari was also recognized for his "great oratory skill". At some point during his tenure, Tiwari joined the Indian National Congress (I).

Tiwari stood for re-election in 1980; however, he was defeated by independent candidate Anupa Singh Deo, receiving 31% of the vote compared to Deo's 40%. Another independent candidate, Duryodhan Majhi, placed third with 23% of the vote. In the 1985 election, Tiwari ran as an independent candidate in a rematch against Deo and Majhi. In a narrow three-way race, Tiwari placed third with 22% of the vote, while Deo and Majhi received 26% and 24%, respectively. In the 1990 election, Tiwari again for the assembly, standing as a Bharatiya Janata Party candidate. Tiwari placed fifth with just 6% of the vote.

=== Death ===
Tiwari died on 21 September 2022 at the age of 93, having been bedridden for several months. His death was commemorated by Naveen Patnaik, the chief minister of Odisha, who stated that Tiwari had "dedicated efforts to the development and welfare of the people of the undivided Kalahandi district".
