= Manorama Mohanty =

Indian politician

Member of the Odisha Legislative Assembly
- Incumbent
- Assumed office 4 Jun 2024
- Preceded by: Bhupinder Singh
- Constituency: Narla

Personal details
- Born: 1 June 1980 (age 45) Narla, Odisha, India
- Party: Biju Janata Dal

Manorama Mohanty (born 1980) is an Indian politician from Odisha. She is an MLA from Narla Assembly Constituency in Kalahandi District. She represents Biju Janata Dal Party. She won the 2024 Odisha Legislative Assembly election.

== Early life and education ==
Mohanty hails from Narla. She married Durga Prasad Mohanty. She completed her Secondary Examination in 2021 from Bihar Board of Open Schooling and Examination, Patna.

== Career ==
Mohanty made her political debut winning the 2024 Odisha Legislative Assembly election from Narla Assembly Constituency representing Biju Janata Dal Party. She defeated Bhakta Charan Das of Indian National Congress by a margin of 5,205 votes.
