= Dhaneswar Majhi =

Indian politician (1941–2024)

Member: 15th Odisha Legislative Assembly
- In office 2014–2019
- Preceded by: Bhupinder Singh
- Succeeded by: Bhupinder Singh
- Constituency: Narla

Member: 12th, 13th Odisha Legislative Assembly
- In office 2000–2009
- Constituency: Kesinga

Member of Parliament, Rajya Sabha
- In office 1978–1984
- Constituency: Odisha

Member: 5th, 6th Odisha Legislative Assembly
- In office 1971–1977
- Preceded by: Anchal Majhi
- Succeeded by: Tejraj Majhi
- Constituency: Narla

Personal details
- Born: 5 July 1941
- Died: 9 October 2024 (aged 83) Kesinga, Kalahandi district, Odisha, India
- Citizenship: Indian
- Party: Biju Janata Dal
- Other political affiliations: Bharatiya Janata Party, Swatantra Party, Janata Party
- Spouse: Tilottam Majhi
- Parent: Amar Majhi (father)
- Occupation: Politician

Dhaneswar Majhi (5 July 1941 – 9 October 2024) was an Indian politician. He was a Member of Parliament, representing Odisha in the Rajya Sabha the upper house of India's Parliament as a member of the Janata Party.

In the 1971, 1974, 2000, 2004, and 2014 Odisha Vidhansabha elections, Majhi was elected from Kesinga and Narla Vidhan Sabha constituency to the 5th, 6th, 12th, 13th, and 15th Odisha Legislative Assemblies respectively.

Majhi died in Kesinga on 9 October 2024, at the age of 83.
