= Subasini Jena =

Indian politician

Subasini Jena (born 1967) is an Indian politician from Odisha. She is a member of the Odisha Legislative Assembly from Basta Assembly constituency in Balasore district. She represents the Biju Janata Dal Party. She won the 2024 Odisha Legislative Assembly election.

== Early life and education ==
Subasini is from Basta, Balasore district, Odisha. She married Rabindra Kumar Jena, a businessman. She also runs her own business. She completed her intermediate (plus two) in Arts in 1986 at F.M. College which is affiliated with Utkal University.

== Career ==
Subasini won the 2024 Odisha Legislative Assembly election from Basta Assembly constituency representing Biju Janata Dal. She polled 83,314 votes to garner 43.66 percentage of vote share and defeated Bijan Nayak of Indian National Congress by a margin of 20,377 votes. She is one of the top three high-asset winning MLAs of Odisha with over Rs.135 cr, according to the affidavit filed with the Election Commission of India.
