= Bhupinder Singh (politician) =

Indian politician

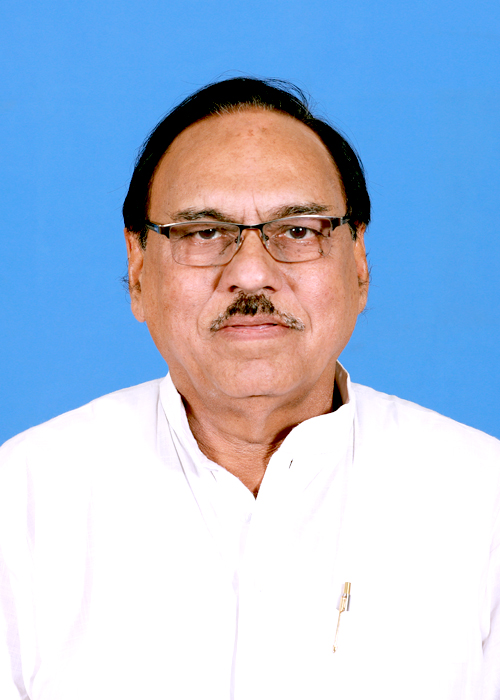

Member of the Odisha Legislative Assembly
- In office 2019–2024
- Preceded by: Dhaneswar Majhi
- Succeeded by: Manorama Mohanty
- Constituency: Narla
- In office 2009–2014
- Preceded by: Balabhadra Majhi
- Succeeded by: Dhaneswar Majhi
- Constituency: Narla
- In office 1995–2000
- Preceded by: Kiran Chandra Singh Deo
- Succeeded by: Dhaneswar Majhi
- Constituency: Kesinga
- In office 1980–1990
- Preceded by: Nagendranath Choudhury
- Succeeded by: Kiran Chandra Singh Deo
- Constituency: Kesinga

Member of Parliament, Rajya Sabha
- In office 26 June 2014 – 1 July 2016
- Preceded by: Shashi Bhusan Behera
- Succeeded by: Bishnu Charan Das
- Constituency: Odisha

Leader of Opposition' in the Odisha Legislative Assembly
- In office 27 May 2009 – 10 March 2014
- Preceded by: Ramachandra Ulaka
- Succeeded by: Narasingha Mishra
- Constituency: Narla

Personal details
- Born: 13 April 1951 (age 75)
- Party: Biju Janata Dal
- Other political affiliations: Indian National Congress
- Spouse: Inderjeet Kaur
- Children: Deljit Singh and Neetu Singh
- Education: Sambalpur University
- Profession: Politician

Bhupinder Singh is an Indian politician. He was elected to the Rajya Sabha in 2014 from Odisha. He is the former Leader of Opposition in the Odisha Legislative Assembly representing from Narla constituency. He is a member of the Biju Janata Dal (BJD) political party. He had left Congress and joined BJD in March 2014.

Bhupinder Singh was again elected as a member of the Legislative Assembly in the 2019 Odisha State Election from Narla (Odisha Vidhan Sabha constituency). He got 53264 votes which is 31.12% of total ballots while his nearest contestant Aniruddha Padhan got 44244 votes which is 25.85% of total votes.

He was the first youth to get Gold medals for his state Odisha in the national games of India 400 and 800 meters on 14 and 17 January 1970. Further adding to his achievements he has received the Indira Gandhi Priyadarshani Award on national integration.
