= Arka Keshari Deo =

Indian politician

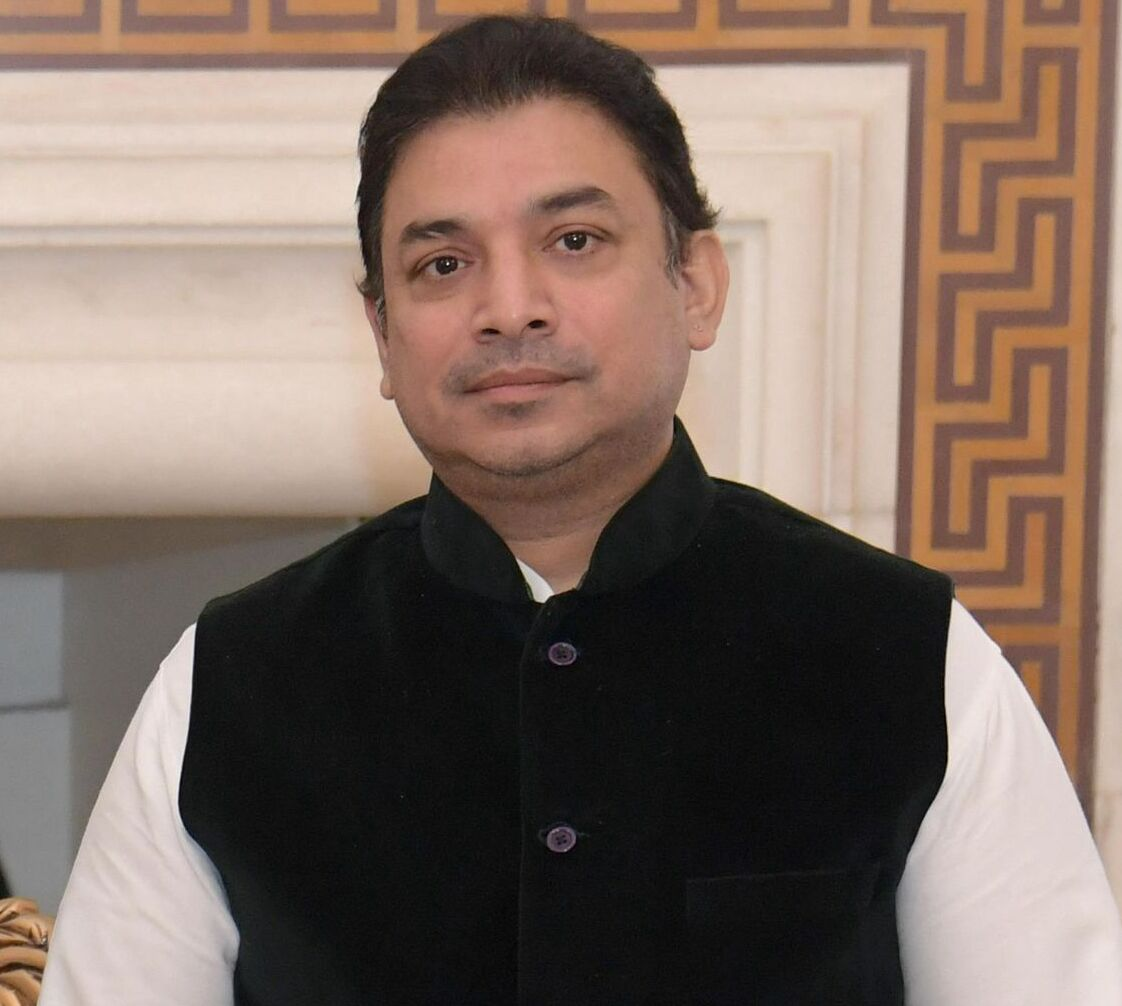
- Deo in 2024

Member of Parliament, Lok Sabha
- In office 18 May 2014 – 20 May 2019
- Preceded by: Bhakta Charan Das
- Succeeded by: Basanta Kumar Panda
- Constituency: Kalahandi

Personal details
- Born: 17 October 1978 (age 47) New Delhi, India
- Party: Bharatiya Janata Party (since 2023)
- Other political affiliations: Biju Janata Dal (2013–2023)
- Spouse: Malvika Devi (m. 2006)
- Children: 1 son
- Parent: Bikram Keshari Deo (father)
- Education: Osmania University (BA)
- Profession: Politician

Arka Keshari Deo is an Indian politician. He was elected to the 16th Lok Sabha in 2014 from Kalahandi constituency in Odisha.He was a member of the Biju Janata Dal from 2013 till 2023. Arka joined BJD in 2013 after death of his father Bikram Keshari Deo. He joined in BJP in September 2023 along with his wife Malvika Devi in Bhubaneswar.

== See also ==
- 2014 Indian general election in Odisha
