= Khariar Assembly constituency =

Constituency of the Odisha legislative assembly in India

Coordinates: 20.29°N 82.76°E

Khariar
- Constituency No. 72 for the Odisha Legislative Assembly

Constituency details
- Country: India
- Region: East India
- State: Odisha
- Division: Southern Division
- District: Nuapada
- Lok Sabha constituency: Kalahandi
- Established: 1961
- Total electors: 2,53,164 (Note: as on 2024) (Note: as data published by election commission)
- Reservation: None

Member of Legislative Assembly
- 17th Odisha Legislative Assembly
- Incumbent Adhiraj Mohan Panigrahi
- Party: Biju Janata Dal
- Elected year: 2024

Khariar is a Vidhan Sabha constituency of Nuapada district, Odisha.

This constituency includes Khariar NAC, Khariar block, Boden block and Sinapali Block.

== Elected members ==
Vote share of winning candidates
2024	46.89%
2019	33.52%
2014	34.42%
2009	37.07%
2004	54.18%
2000	61.08%
1995	49.41%
1990	49.05%
1985	25.78%
1980	40.04%
1977	55.68%

Since its formation in 1961, 14 elections were held till date.

List of members elected from Khariar constituency are:

Election	Name	Party
2024	Adhiraj Mohan Panigrahi	Biju Janata Dal
2019	Adhiraj Mohan Panigrahi	Indian National Congress
2014	Duryodhan Majhi	Bharatiya Janata Party
2009	Hitesh Kumar Bagartti	Bharatiya Janata Party
2004	Duryodhan Majhi	Biju Janata Dal
2000	Duryodhan Majhi	Biju Janata Dal
1995	Duryodhan Majhi	Janata Dal
1990	Duryodhan Majhi	Janata Dal
1985	Anupa Singh Deo	Indian National Congress
1980	Anupa Singh Deo	Independent politician
1977	Kapil Narayan Tiwari	Independent politician
1974	Anupa Singh Deo	Utkal Congress
1971 -1973 : Constituency did not exist
1967	Anupa Singh Deo	Indian National Congress
1961	Anupa Singh Deo	Swatantra Party

== Election results ==
=== 2024 ===
Voting were held on 13 May 2024 in 1st phase of Odisha Assembly Election & 4th phase of Indian General Election. Counting of votes was on 4 June 2024. In 2024 election, Biju Janata Dal candidate Adhiraj Mohan Panigrahi defeated Bharatiya Janata Party candidate Hitesh Kumar Bagartti by a margin of 9,618 votes.

2024 Vidhan Sabha Election, Khariar
Party	Candidate	Votes	%	±%
BJD	Adhiraj Mohan Panigrahi	93,246	46.89	▲13.37
BJP	Hitesh Kumar Bagartti	83,628	42.05	
INC	Kamal Chandra Tandi	13,330	6.7	
NOTA	None of the above	2436	1.22	
Majority		9,618	4.84	
Turnout		1,98,876	78.56	
BJD gain from INC				

=== 2019 ===
In 2019 election, Indian National Congress candidate Adhiraj Mohan Panigrahi defeated Biju Janata Dal candidate Lambodar Nial by a margin of 2,857 votes.

2019 Vidhan Sabha Election, Khariar
Party	Candidate	Votes	%	±%
INC	Adhiraj Mohan Panigrahi	59,308	33.52	▲3.37
BJD	Lambodar Nial	56,451	31.90	▲3.39
BJP	Ritarani Bagartti	52,245	29.53	▼4.89
NOTA	None of the above	1,360	0.77	
Majority		2,857	1.62	
Turnout		1,76,935	74.18	
INC gain from BJP				

=== 2014 ===
In 2014 election, Bhartiya Janta Party candidate Duryodhan Majhi defeated Indian National Congress candidate Adhiraj Mohan Panigrahi by a margin of 7,126 votes.

2014 Vidhan Sabha Election, Khariar
Party	Candidate	Votes	%	±%
BJP	Duryodhan Majhi	57,533	34.42	▼2.65
INC	Adhiraj Mohan Panigrahi	50,407	30.15	▲9.90
BJD	Lambodar Nial	47,655	28.51	▼0.64
NOTA	None of the above	2,198	1.31	−
Majority		7,126	4.26	▼3.65
Turnout		1,67,170	76.8	▲9.49
Registered electors		2,17,682		
BJP hold				

=== 2009 ===
In 2009 election, Bharatiya Janata Party candidate Hitesh Kumar Bagartti defeated Biju Janata Dal candidate Duryodhan Majhi by a margin of 11,366 votes.

2009 Vidhan Sabha Election, Khariar
Party	Candidate	Votes	%	±%
BJP	Hitesh Kumar Bagartti	53,238	37.07	−
BJD	Duryodhan Majhi	41,872	29.15	−
INC	Baishampayan Meher	29,080	20.25	−
Majority		11,366	7.91 (Note: % of total valid votes)	−
Turnout		1,43,709	67.31	
BJP gain from BJD				
