= Junagarh Assembly constituency =

Constituency of the Odisha legislative assembly in India

Coordinates: 19.86°N 82.94°E

Junagarh
- Constituency No. 78 for the Odisha Legislative Assembly

Constituency details
- Country: India
- Region: East India
- State: Odisha
- Division: Southern Division
- District: Kalahandi
- Lok Sabha constituency: Kalahandi
- Established: 1951
- Total electors: 2,46,605 (Note: as on 2024) (Note: as data published by election commission)
- Reservation: None

Member of Legislative Assembly
- 17th Odisha Legislative Assembly
- Incumbent Manoj Meher
- Party: Bharatiya Janata party
- Elected year: 2024

Junagarh is a Vidhan Sabha constituency of Kalahandi district, Odisha, India.

This constituency includes Junagarh, Junagarh block and Golamunda block.

== Elected members ==
Vote share of winning candidates
2024	38.64%
2019	45.83%
2014	34.21%
2009	31.48%
2004	36.36%
2000	47.62%
1998 (bypoll)	39.21%
1995	32.81%
1990	43.02%
1985	51.65%
1980	46.67%
1977	43.67%

Since its formation in 1951, 17 elections were held till date including in one bypoll in 1998. It was a 2-member constituency in 1952.

List of members elected from Junagarh constituency are:

Year	Member	Party
2024	Dibya Shankar Mishra	Biju Janata Dal
2019	Dibya Shankar Mishra	Biju Janata Dal
2014	Dibya Shankar Mishra	Biju Janata Dal
2009	Gobardhan Dash	Indian National Congress
2004	Himansu Sekhar Meher	Bharatiya Janata Party
2000	Himansu Sekhar Meher	Bharatiya Janata Party
1998 (bypoll) (Note: Resignation of Bikram Keshari Deo on his election to Lok Sabha)	Himansu Sekhar Meher	Bharatiya Janata Party
1995	Bikram Keshari Deo	Bharatiya Janata Party
1990	Bikram Keshari Deo	Bharatiya Janata Party
1985	Bikram Keshari Deo	Janata Party
1980	Maheswar Barad	Indian National Congress (I)
1977	Maheswar Barad	Indian National Congress
1974	Udit Pratap Deo	Swatantra Party
1971	Trinath Sarab	Swatantra Party
1967	Maheswar Naik	Swatantra Party
1961	Maheswar Naik	Swatantra Party
1957-61 : Constituency did not exist
1951	Pratap Keshari Deo	Ganatantra Parishad
1951	Dayanidhi Naik	Ganatantra Parishad

== Election results ==
=== 2024 ===
Voting were held on 13 May 2024 in 1st phase of Odisha Assembly Election & 4th phase of Indian General Election. Counting of votes was on 4 June 2024. In 2024 election, Biju Janata Dal candidate Dibya Shankar Mishra defeated Bharatiya Janata Party candidate Manoj Kumar Meher by a margin of 1,338 votes.

2024 Vidhan Sabha Election, Junagarh
Party	Candidate	Votes	%	±%
BJD	Dibya Shankar Mishra	77,037	38.64	▼7.19
BJP	Manoj Kumar Meher	75,699	37.97	▲7.38
INC	Tuleswar Naik	39,492	19.81	▲2.12
NOTA	None of the above	2,735	1.37	▲0.12
Majority		1,338	0.67	▼14.57
Turnout		1,99,354	80.84	
BJD hold				

=== 2019 ===
In 2019 election, Biju Janata Dal candidate Dibya Shankar Mishra defeated Bharatiya Janata Party candidate Manoj Kumar Meher by a margin of 27,859 votes.

2019 Vidhan Sabha Election, Junagarh
Party	Candidate	Votes	%	±%
BJD	Dibya Shankar Mishra	83,789	45.83	▲11.62
BJP	Manoj Kumar Meher	55,930	30.59	▲2.40
INC	Anil Kumar Singh Deo	32,343	17.69	▼5.78
NOTA	None of the above	2,290	1.25	
Majority		27,859	15.24	
Turnout		1,82,838	78.55	
BJD hold				

=== 2014 ===
In 2014 election, Biju Janata Dal candidate Dibya Shankar Mishra defeated Bharatiya Janata Party candidate Anil Kumar Singh Deo by a margin of 17,728 votes.

2014 Vidhan Sabha Election, Junagarh
Party	Candidate	Votes	%	±%
BJD	Dibya Shankar Mishra	56,443	34.21	−
BJP	Anil Kumar Singh Deo	46,498	28.19	−
INC	Gobardhan Dash	38,715	23.47	−
NOTA	None of the above	2747	1.67	−
Majority		17,728	6.02	
Turnout		1,64,973	75.96	
BJD gain from INC				

=== 2009 ===
In 2009 election, Indian National Congress candidate Gobardhan Dash defeated Biju Janata Dal candidate Bira Sipka by a margin of 6,537 votes.

2009 Vidhan Sabha Election, Junagarh
Party	Candidate	Votes	%	±%
INC	Gobardhan Dash	45,349	31.48	−
BJD	Bira Sipka	38,812	26.94	−
BJP	Himansu Sekhar Meher	34,334	23.83	−
Majority		6,537	4.54 (Note: %of total valid votes)	−
Turnout		1,44,053	69.76	−
INC gain from BJP		Swing	2.79 (Note: 2004 Voter turnout was 66.97%)	
