= Anam Naik =

Indian politician

- ଅନାମ ନାଏକ

Member: 15th Odisha Legislative Assembly
- In office 2014–2019
- Preceded by: Dushmant Naik
- Succeeded by: Pradipta Kumar Naik
- Constituency: Bhawanipatna

Personal details
- Party: Biju Janata Dal
- Occupation: Politician

Anam Naik is an Indian politician and a senior member of the Biju Janata Dal. He is BJD MLA from Bhawanipatna.
