= Hitesh Kumar Bagartti =

Indian politician

Member of the Odisha Legislative Assembly
- In office 2009–2014
- Preceded by: Duryodhan Majhi
- Succeeded by: Duryodhan Majhi
- Constituency: Khariar

Personal details
- Born: 1 July 1966 (age 60) Khariar, Odisha, India
- Party: Bharatiya Janata Party
- Spouse: Reeta Rani Bagartti
- Children: 1 daughter, 1 son
- Education: Khariar Autonomous College, Khariar
- Profession: Politician, Agriculture

Hitesh Kumar Bagartti is an Indian politician and member of the Bharatiya Janata Party. Bagartti is a former member of the Odisha Legislative Assembly from the Khariar constituency in Nuapada district.

== Early life ==
Hitesh Kumar Bagartti was born in 1966 to Kunja Bihari Bagartti in a Hindu Gouda (Yadav) family, which caste is the dominant caste group in Nuapada district of Odisha.
