= Bikram Keshari Deo =

Indian politician

Member of Parliament, Lok Sabha
- In office 1998–2009
- Preceded by: Bhakta Charan Das
- Succeeded by: Bhakta Charan Das
- Constituency: Kalahandi

Member of Odisha Legislative Assembly
- In office 1985–1998
- Preceded by: Maheswar Barad
- Succeeded by: Himansu Sekhar Meher
- Constituency: Junagarh

Personal details
- Born: 26 November 1952 Bhawanipatna, Kalahandi, Odisha
- Died: 7 October 2009 (aged 56)
- Party: Bharatiya Janata Party
- Spouse: Nayanshree Devi (m. 1974–2009)
- Children: 1 Son (Arka Keshari Deo), 2 Daughters
- Parents: Pratap Keshari Deo (father); Kasturika Moohini Devi (mother)
- Education: Bachelor of Arts
- Alma mater: Delhi University

Bikram Keshari Deo (26 November 1952 – 7 October 2009) was a member of the 12th, 13th and 14th Lok Sabha of India. He represented the Kalahandi constituency of Orissa and was a member of the Bharatiya Janata Party (BJP).

He died on 7 October 2009 after suffering a cardiac arrest.
