= Bihar School Examination Board =

Examination Board in Bihar

- बिहार विद्यालय परीक्षा समिति

- Abbreviation: BSEB
- Formation: 1952 (74 years ago)
- Type: Governmental Board of Education
- Legal status: Active
- Headquarters: Patna, Bihar, India
- Location: Campus 1 - Sinha Library Road, Patna - 800017, Bihar. Campus 2 - Buddh Marg, Patna - 800001, Bihar
- Region served: Patna
- Official language: Hindi; English
- Owner: Government of Bihar
- Chairman: Anand Kishor, IAS
- Secretary: Pramod Kumar
- Parent organization: Education Department of Bihar
- Affiliations: 22,28,573 schools (8 December 2023)
- Staff: 900
- Website: www.biharboard.net.in

The Bihar School Examination Board (abbreviated BSEB) is a statutory body under section 3 of the Bihar School Examination Act - 1952, which is functioning under the Government of Bihar devised to conduct examinations at secondary and senior secondary standards in both government and private schools belonging to the state of Bihar.

The exam is conducted based on a syllabus as prescribed by the Government of Bihar. It is headquartered in the capital of the state, Patna. Along with school examinations, it also conducts departmental examinations such as Diploma in Physical Education, Certificate in Physical Education and Teachers Eligibility Test (TET) for Bihar state, Simultala Residential Entrance Examinations (for admission to Simultala Awasiya Vidyalaya), Examination for Diploma in Elementary Education etc.

The board conducts secondary and senior secondary school examinations twice a year. One is the annual board examinations in February–March and the other is a supplementary examination held in May–June of every year.

== Bihar Board 10th subjects ==
As per the syllabus, math, science, and social science, two language subjects are compulsory subjects for Class 10 students. Apart from this, they can choose one optional subject which can be a language subject or an elective subject.

== Bihar Board 12th subjects ==
There are three streams in Class 12 i.e. arts, commerce, and science stream. For arts, there are a lot of subjects available from which 5 subjects a student needs to choose. Commerce stream students need to appear for English, Hindi, Statistical Mathematics, Business studies, and Accountancy subjects. Science stream students have Physics, Chemistry, Biology, and Mathematics as main subjects and two are electives which are also compulsory.

Along with these subjects, students have the option to choose one additional subject while filling application form.

== Bihar Board Exam Pattern ==
The pattern for both matriculation and intermediate exams is decided by the Bihar School Examination Board. In the examination, each paper will consist of 50% objective-type questions carrying 1 mark each. OMR sheets for 1-mark MCQs are also provided to the students. The paper will also consist of descriptive-type questions. In addition, there are subjects which have a provision for practicals, with a weightage of 30 practicals + 70 written.

== Bihar Board Syllabus ==
The syllabus for the Bihar School Examination Board (BSEB) varies depending on the class and stream (Science, Commerce, Arts).

Class 10th (Matriculation) Syllabus: The class 10th syllabus covers core subjects like Mathematics, Science, Social Science, English, and Hindi. It also includes optional subjects like Sanskrit, Urdu, etc. The syllabus is designed to prepare students for the Secondary School Examination (Class 10th board exam).

Class 12th (Intermediate) Syllabus: The class 12th syllabus varies depending on the stream chosen by the students, such as Science, Commerce, or Arts. The science stream includes subjects like Physics, Chemistry, Biology, and Mathematics, and the Commerce stream includes subjects like Accountancy, Economics, Business Studies, etc. The arts stream includes subjects like History, Political Science, Geography, etc.

== See also ==
- Education in Bihar
- Bihar Board of Open Schooling and Examination
- Bihar Combined Entrance Competitive Examination Board
