= Malvika Devi =

Member of the Lok Sabha

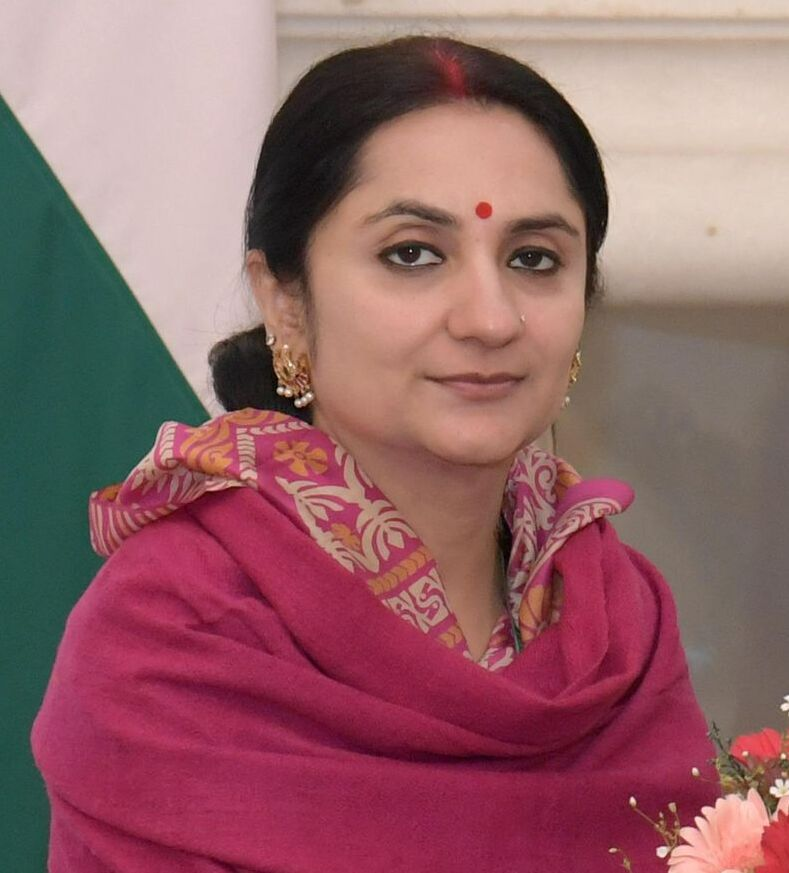
- Malvika in 2024

Member of Parliament, Lok Sabha
- Incumbent
- Assumed office 4 June 2024
- Preceded by: Basanta Kumar Panda
- Constituency: Kalahandi

Personal details
- Born: Malvika Singh; 10 June 1980 (age 46) New Delhi, India
- Party: Bharatiya Janata Party (since 2023)
- Other political affiliations: Biju Janta Dal (2013–2023)
- Spouse: Arka Keshari Deo (m. 2006)
- Children: 1 son
- Education: Delhi University, Jesus and Mary College

Malvika Devi or Malvika Keshari Deo, popularly known as Rani Maa is an Indian politician from New Delhi in India. She is married to Arka Keshari Deo, a former Member of Parliament, Lok Sabha. Devi has been elected as a BJP member from Kalahandi Lok Sabha constituency in 2024 Indian general election in Odisha.
