= Basta Assembly constituency =

Constituency of the Odisha legislative assembly in India

Coordinates: 21.70°N 87.06°E

Basta
- Constituency No. 37 for the Odisha Legislative Assembly

Constituency details
- Country: India
- Region: East India
- State: Odisha
- Division: Central Division
- District: Balasore
- Lok Sabha constituency: Balasore
- Established: 1951
- Total electors: 2,46,159 (Note: as on 2024) (Note: as data published by election commission)
- Reservation: None

Member of Legislative Assembly
- 17th Odisha Legislative Assembly
- Incumbent Subasini Jena
- Party: Biju Janata Dal
- Elected year: 2024

Basta is a Vidhan Sabha constituency of Balasore district, Odisha.

Area of this constituency includes all 28 GPs of Baliapal block and 17 GPs (Kainagiri, Naikudi, Mukulishi, Irda, Sahada, Chakuri, Darada, Barungadia, Patrajhada, Brahmanda, Sadanandapur, Kudia, Baharda, Mathani, Dudhahansa, Routpada and Gadapada) of Basta block.

== Elected members ==
Vote share of winning candidates
2024	43.66%
2019	41.96%
2014	47.69%
2009	50.68%
2004	55.83%
2000	53.36%
1995	47.34%
1990	46.23%
1985	67.84%
1980	52.77%
1977	56.66%

Since its formation in 1951, 18 elections were held till date including one bypoll in 1958.

List of members elected from Basta constituency are:

Year	Member	Party
2024	Subasini Jena	Biju Janata Dal
2019	Nityananda Sahoo	Biju Janata Dal
2014	Nityananda Sahoo	Biju Janata Dal
2009	Raghunath Mohanty	Biju Janata Dal
2004	Raghunath Mohanty	Biju Janata Dal
2000	Raghunath Mohanty	Biju Janata Dal
1995	Raghunath Mohanty	Janata Dal
1990	Raghunath Mohanty	Janata Dal
1985	Bhupal Chandra Mohapatra	Indian National Congress
1980	Bhupal Chandra Mohapatra	Indian National Congress (I)
1977	Maheswar Baug	Janata Party
1974	Chintamani Jena	Indian National Congress
1971	Chintamani Jena	Communist Party of India
1967	Chintamani Jena	Indian National Congress
1961	Maheswar Baug	Praja Socialist Party
1958 (bypoll) (Note: Resignation of Akshaya Narayana Praharaja)	Akshaya Narayana Praharaja	Indian National Congress
1957	Akshaya Narayana Praharaja	Indian National Congress
1951	Trilochan Senapati	Indian National Congress

== Election Results ==
=== 2024 ===
Voting were held on 1 June 2024 in 4th phase of Odisha Assembly Election & 7th phase of Indian General Election. Counting of votes was on 4 June 2024. In 2024 election, Biju Janata Dal candidate Subasini Jena defeated Indian National Congress candidate Bijan Nayak by a margin of 20,377 votes.

2024 Odisha Vidhan Sabha Election, Basta
Party	Candidate	Votes	%	±%
BJD	Subasini Jena	83,314	43.66	▲1.70
INC	Bijan Nayak	62,937	32.99	▼2.03
BJP	Rabindra Nath Andia	42,732	22.40	▲0.83
NOTA	None of the above	403	0.21	▼0.05
Majority		20,377	10.67	
Turnout		1,90,803	77.51	
BJD hold				

=== 2019 ===
In 2019 election, Biju Janata Dal candidate Nityananda Sahu defeated Indian National Congress candidate Bijan Nayak by a margin of 11,864 votes.

2019 Vidhan Sabha Election, Basta
Party	Candidate	Votes	%	±%
BJD	Nityananda Sahoo	71,737	41.96	▼5.73
INC	Bijan Nayak	59,873	35.02	▼8.67
BJP	Raghunath Mohanty	36,874	21.57	▲14.63
NOTA	None of the above	441	0.26	
Majority		11,864	6.94	
Turnout		1,70,957	75.33	
BJD hold				

=== 2014 ===
In 2014 election, Biju Janata Dal candidate Nityananda Sahoo defeated Indian National Congress candidate Jay Narayan Mohanty by a margin of 6,433 votes.

2014 Vidhan Sabha Election, Basta
Party	Candidate	Votes	%	±%
BJD	Nityananda Sahoo	76,737	47.69	▼2.99
INC	Jay Narayan Mohanty	70,304	43.69	▼0.51
BJP	Shyama Prasad Behera	11,165	6.94	▲3.73
NOTA	None of the above	604	0.38	−
Majority		6,433	39.97	33.48
Turnout		1,60,922	80.14	2.96
Registered electors		2,00,793		
BJD hold				

=== 2009 ===
In 2009 election, Biju Janata Dal candidate Raghunath Mohanty defeated Indian National Congress candidate Jay Narayan Mohanty by a margin of 9,530 votes.

2009 Vidhan Sabha Election, Basta
Party	Candidate	Votes	%	±%
BJD	Raghunath Mohanty	74,472	50.68	−
INC	Jaynarayan Mohanty	64,942	44.20	−
BJP	Arabinda Behera	4,713	3.21	−
Majority		9,530	6.49 (Note: %of total valid votes)	−
Turnout		1,46,933	77.18	−
BJD hold				
