= Dharmagarh Assembly constituency =

Constituency of the Odisha legislative assembly in India

Coordinates: 19.87°N 82.78°E

Dharmagarh
- Constituency No. 79 for the Odisha Legislative Assembly

Constituency details
- Country: India
- Region: East India
- State: Odisha
- Division: Southern Division
- District: Kalahandi
- Lok Sabha constituency: Kalahandi
- Established: 1957
- Total electors: 2,61,881 (Note: as on 2024) (Note: as data published by election commission)
- Reservation: None

Member of Legislative Assembly
- 17th Odisha Legislative Assembly
- Incumbent Sudhir Ranjan Pattjoshi
- Party: Bharatiya Janata Party
- Elected year: 2024

Dharmagarh is a Vidhan Sabha constituency of Kalahandi district, Odisha. After 2008 Delimitation, Koksara Assembly constituency was subsumed into this constituency.

This constituency includes Dharmgarh block, Kalampur block, Koksara block, and 2 Gram panchayats (Bandigaon and Ranamal) of Jaipatana block.

== Elected members ==
Vote share of winning candidates
2024	41.84%
2019	34.75%
2014	32.76%
2009	35.83%
2004	48.25%
2000	42.44%
1995	31.64%
1990	54.66%
1985	61.45%
1980	51.80%
1977	41.57%

Since its formation in 1957, 16 elections were held till date. It was a 2-member constituency in 1957.

Year	Member	Party
2024	Sudhir Ranjan Pattjoshi	Bharatiya Janata Party
2019	Mousadhi Bag	Biju Janata Dal
2014	Puspendra Singh Deo	Biju Janata Dal
2000	Puspendra Singh Deo	Biju Janata Dal
2004	Bira Sipka	Biju Janata Dal
2009	Bira Sipka	Biju Janata Dal
1995	Bira Sipka	Janata Dal
1990	Bharat Bhusan Bemal	Janata Dal
1985	Jugaram Behera	Indian National Congress
1980	Gajanan Nayak	Indian National Congress
1977	Gajanan Nayak	Indian National Congress (I)
1974	Dayanidhi Naik	Swatantra Party
1971	Lochan Dhangada Majhi	Swatantra Party
1967	Lochan Dhangada Majhi	Swatantra Party
1961	Mukunda Naik	Swatantra Party
1957 (Note: It was a 2 member constituency)	Janardan Majhi	Ganatantra Parishad
1957	Birakeshari Deo	Ganatantra Parishad

== Election results ==
=== 2024 ===
Voting were held on 13 May 2024 in 1st phase of Odisha Assembly Election & 4th phase of Indian General Election. Counting of votes was on 4 June 2024. In 2024 election, Bharatiya Janata Party candidate Sudhir Ranjan Pattjoshi defeated Biju Janata Dal candidate Puspendra Singh Deo by a margin of 18,927 votes.

2024 Odisha Legislative Assembly election: Dharmagarh
Party	Candidate	Votes	%	±%
BJP	Sudhir Ranjan Pattjoshi	87,890	41.84	▲15.28
BJD	Puspendra Singh Deo	68,963	32.83	▼1.92
INC	Rasmirekha Rout	41,269	19.65	▼2.02
BSP	Tirtharaj Durga	2,167	1.03	▲0.05
NOTA	None of the above	2,105	1.00	▼0.12
Majority		18,927	9.01	▲0.82
Turnout		2,10,054	80.21	
BJP gain from BJD				

=== 2019 ===
In 2019 election, Biju Janata Dal candidate Mousadhi Bag defeated Bharatiya Janata Party candidate Anant Pratap Deo by a margin of 16,098 votes.

2019 Odisha Legislative Assembly election: Dharmagarh
Party	Candidate	Votes	%	±%
BJD	Mousadhi Bag	68,291	34.75	▲1.99
BJP	Anant Pratap Deo	52,193	26.56	▲2.63
INC	Digambar Duria	42,593	21.67	▲3.32
NOTA	None of the above	2,210	1.12	
Majority		16,098	8.19	
Turnout		1,96,538	78.5	
BJD hold				

=== 2014 ===
In 2014 election, Biju Janata Dal candidate Puspendra Singh Deo defeated Bharatiya Janta Party candidate Rabindra Pattjoshi by a margin of 16,158 votes.

2014 Odisha Legislative Assembly election: Dharmagarh
Party	Candidate	Votes	%	±%
BJD	Puspendra Singh Deo	59,931	32.76	
BJP	Rabindra Pattjoshi	43,773	23.93	
INC	Tushar Ranjan Pattjoshi	33,569	18.35	
NOTA	None of the above	3,669	2.01	
Majority		16,158	8.83	
Turnout		1,82,992	78.19	
BJD hold				

=== 2009 ===
In 2009 election, Biju Janata Dal candidate Puspendra Singh Deo defeated Indian National Congress candidate Rahasbihari Behera by a margin of 22,906 votes.

2009 Odisha Legislative Assembly election, Dharmagarh
Party	Candidate	Votes	%	±%
BJD	Puspendra Singh Deo	56,470	35.83	▼12.42
INC	Rahasbihari Behera	33,564	21.30	▼14.45
BJP	Janardan Panda	31,573	▲20.03	−
Majority		22,906	14.53 (Note: %of total valid votes)	−
Turnout		1,57,621	71.66	−
BJD hold		Swing	7.14 (Note: 2004 voter turnout was 64.52%)	
