= Saptasajya =

Saptasajya Sapta Sajya
- Village
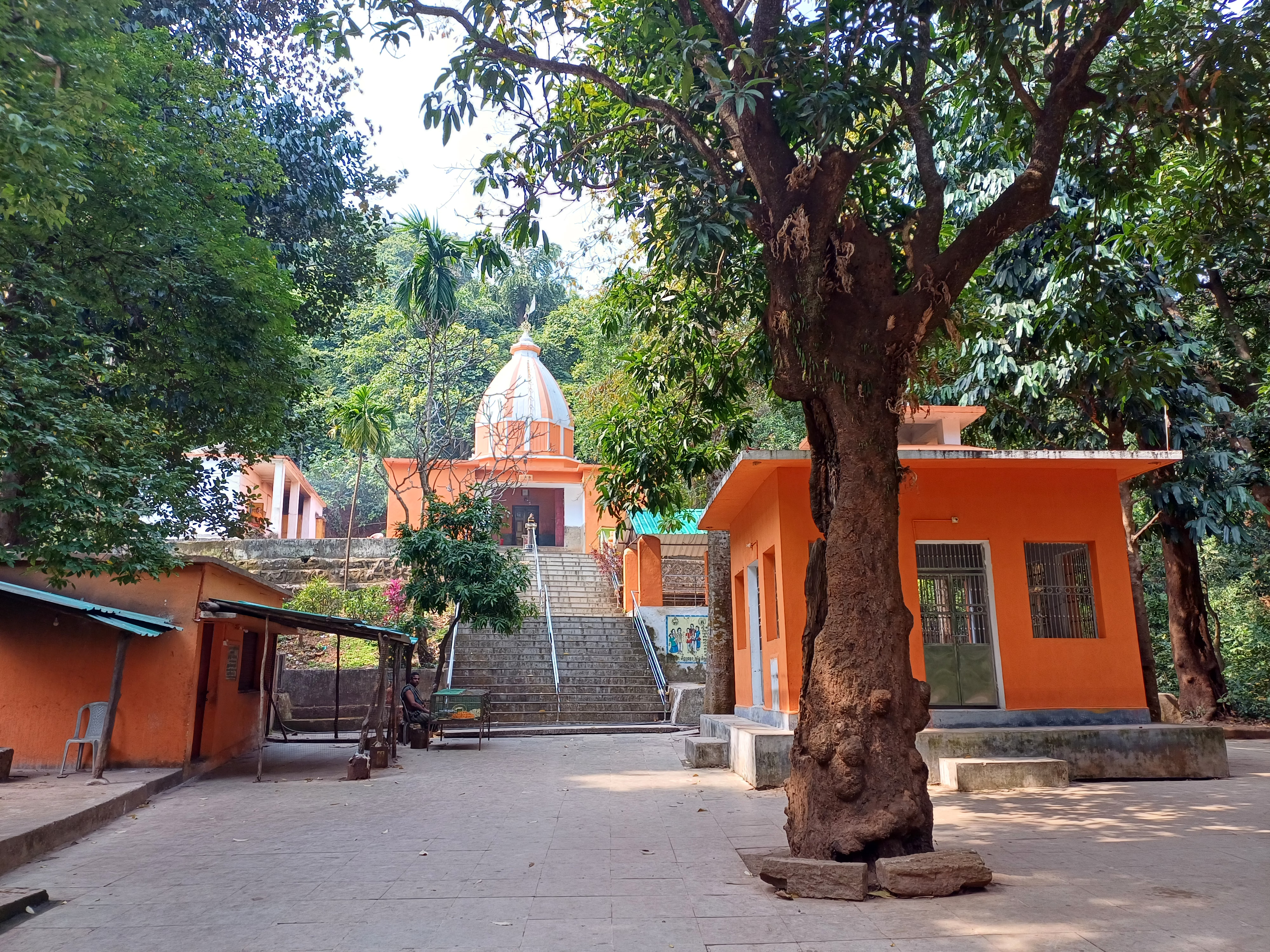
- Renowned Heritage of Saptasajya Village

- Location within Odisha Location within India
- Coordinates: 20.5746131°N 85.5478763°E
- Country: India
- State: Odisha
- District: Dhenkanal

Government
  - Body: Gram panchayat
- Elevation: 77.2 m (253 ft)

Population (2011)
  - Village: 1,091
  - Rural: 1,091
- Postal code: 759013
- Website: Official Website

Saptasajya is a village in Dhenkanal district, Odisha, India. Important establishments include ICAR Saptasajya Mango germplasm bank, a high school, Teakwood garden and a bee farm.

== Geography ==
This small village is situated at a distance of 11 kilometres (6.8 mi) from Dhenkanal and is well connected by road transport. The government constructed the road in 1982. Nearby villages include Badagila, Sadeibereni, Badrapalli, Kamning, Padmanavpur and Patrabhag.

== Demography ==
According to the 2011 census, there are total 268 families residing in Saptasajya comprising 1091 persons. With 548 males and 543 females, the sex ratio of Saptasajya (991 women per 1000 men) which is higher than Odisha state average of 979. However, among children Saptasajya has 809 girls per 1000 boys, vastly lower than Odisha average of 941.

Saptasajya village has higher literacy rate compared to Odisha. In 2011, literacy rate of Saptasajya village was 85.81% compared to 72.87% of Odisha. Male literacy stands at 88.02% while female literacy rate was 83.65%.

== Mythology ==
Mythologically this place finds its mention in many legends. According to folklore, it derives the name from the surrounding seven hills. There is a different folklore that the Saptarishi had their ashramas in this place thereby giving the place its name as the Seven Beds or Seven Homes. There is also a mythological story, that, Rama during his exile or vanvasa had spent seven days in this spot. Another folklore goes that the Pandavas during their 12 years of exile and one year of Agyata Vasa (incognito exile) had chosen these mountains for shelter

== Tourism ==
Saptasajya is a popular tourist hub for offbeat genre crowd who want to relax and move away from busy life. It is advised in most tourism sites that a daily excursion to the village from nearby tourism hub Dhenkanal is the best option. There are no hotels or suitable urban accommodation provision noted in the village.

The reserve forest boasts of rich flora and fauna and is a good retreat from busy urban life. Nearest airport is Biju Patnaik Airport at Bhubaneswar. The nearest bus and railway station is at Dhenkanal.

=== Temples ===
Apart from the natural environment of the place, there are many old temples that attract visitor attention. There is one particular Raghunath temple complex with main deity being Rama that attracts tourists and locals alike. Inside the temple complex Annapurna temple was constructed in 1982, the 1st floor Kali temple in 1985 and the Surya Narayan temple in 1990. The temples of Rameswaram Shiva, Ganesha, Mahavir, and the Navagraha temple with one room for each graha are also present. Mahakali, Mata Saraswati, Sri Nrushingha temple are conceived to be built in the holy complex.

== Saptasajya Wildlife Sanctuary ==
The Saptasajya Wildlife Sanctuary (alternatively, Saptasajya Reserve Forest) is a relatively small protected forest reserve of 20 km^{2} (8 sq mi) in the Chota Nagpur Plateau region. It is a mixed deciduous forest dominated by the Sal tree. It got officially recognized as a sanctuary in 1970. The fauna mainly consists of wild goats, buffaloes, cows, leopard and a variety of birds.

== Gallery ==
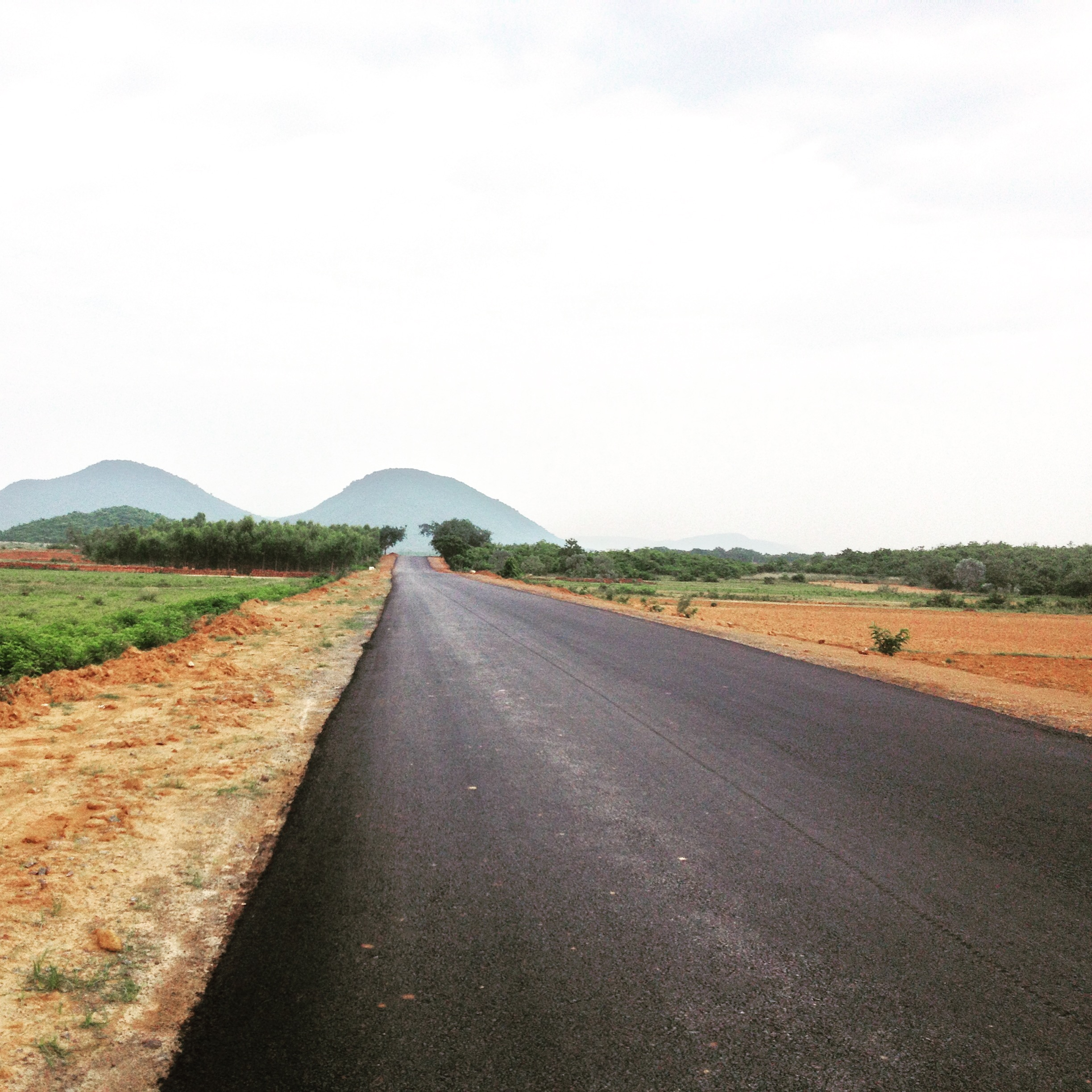
Scenic Saptasajya Road

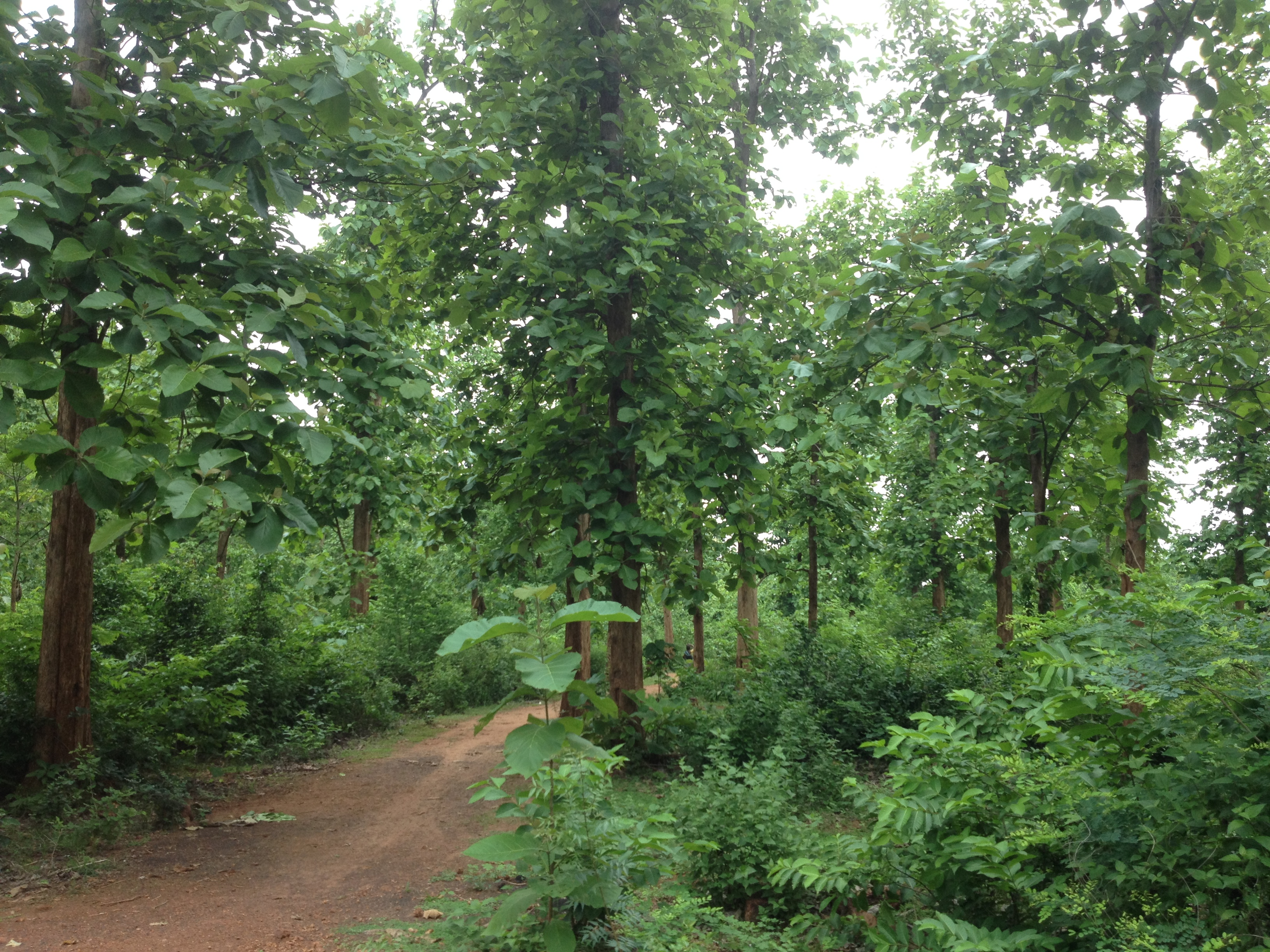
Teakwood Garden

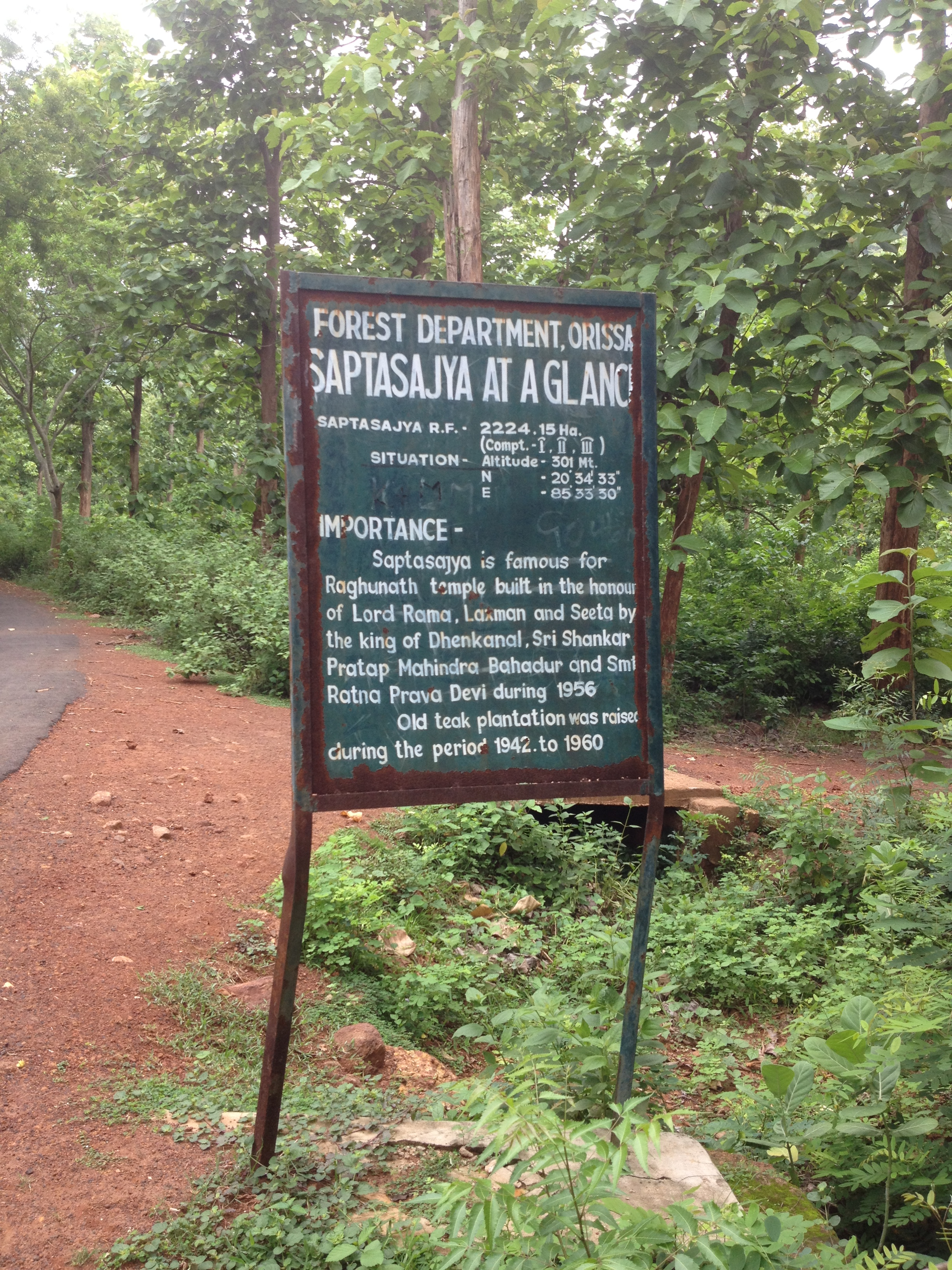
Saptasajya Reserve Forest

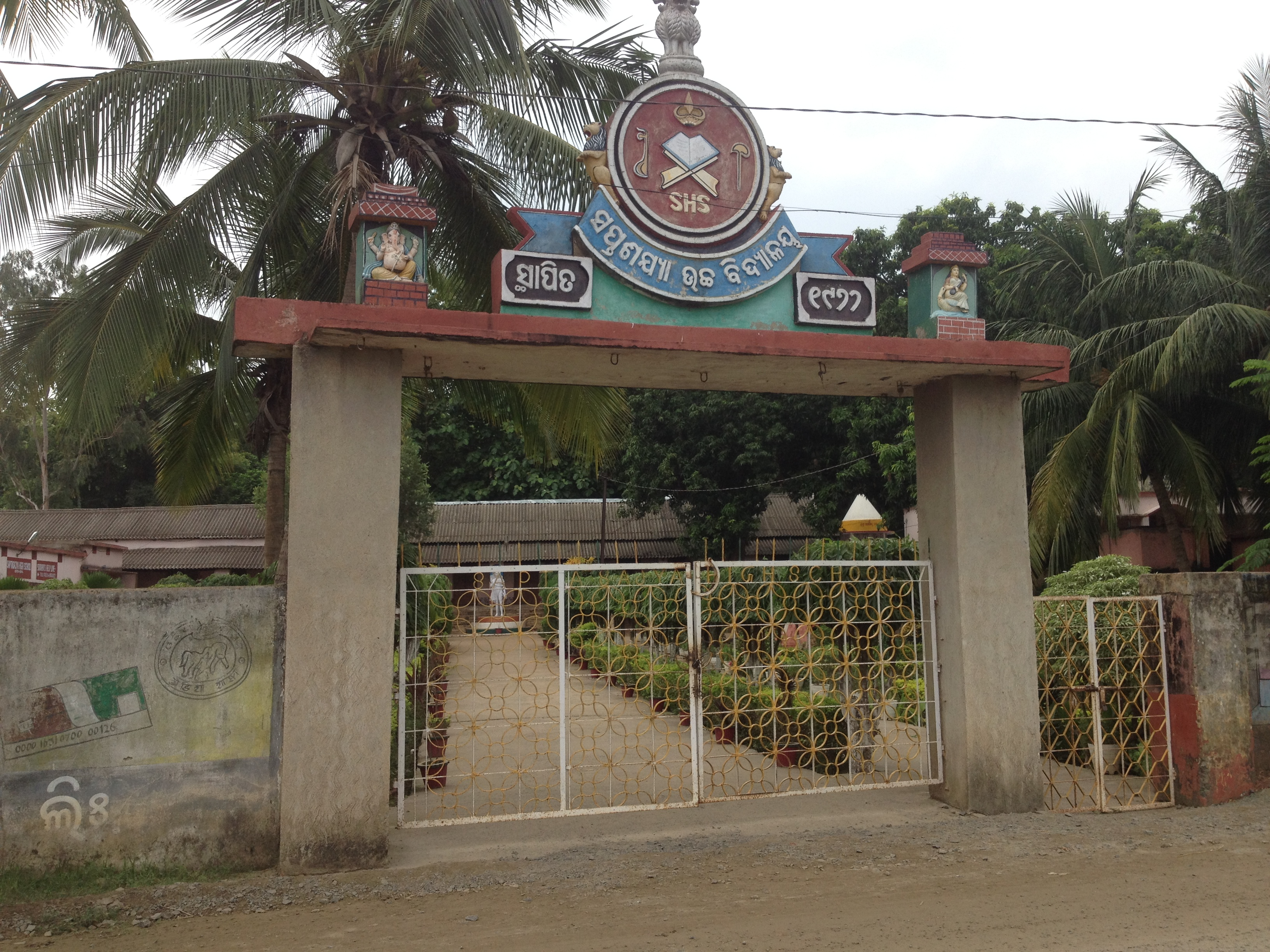
Saptasajya High School

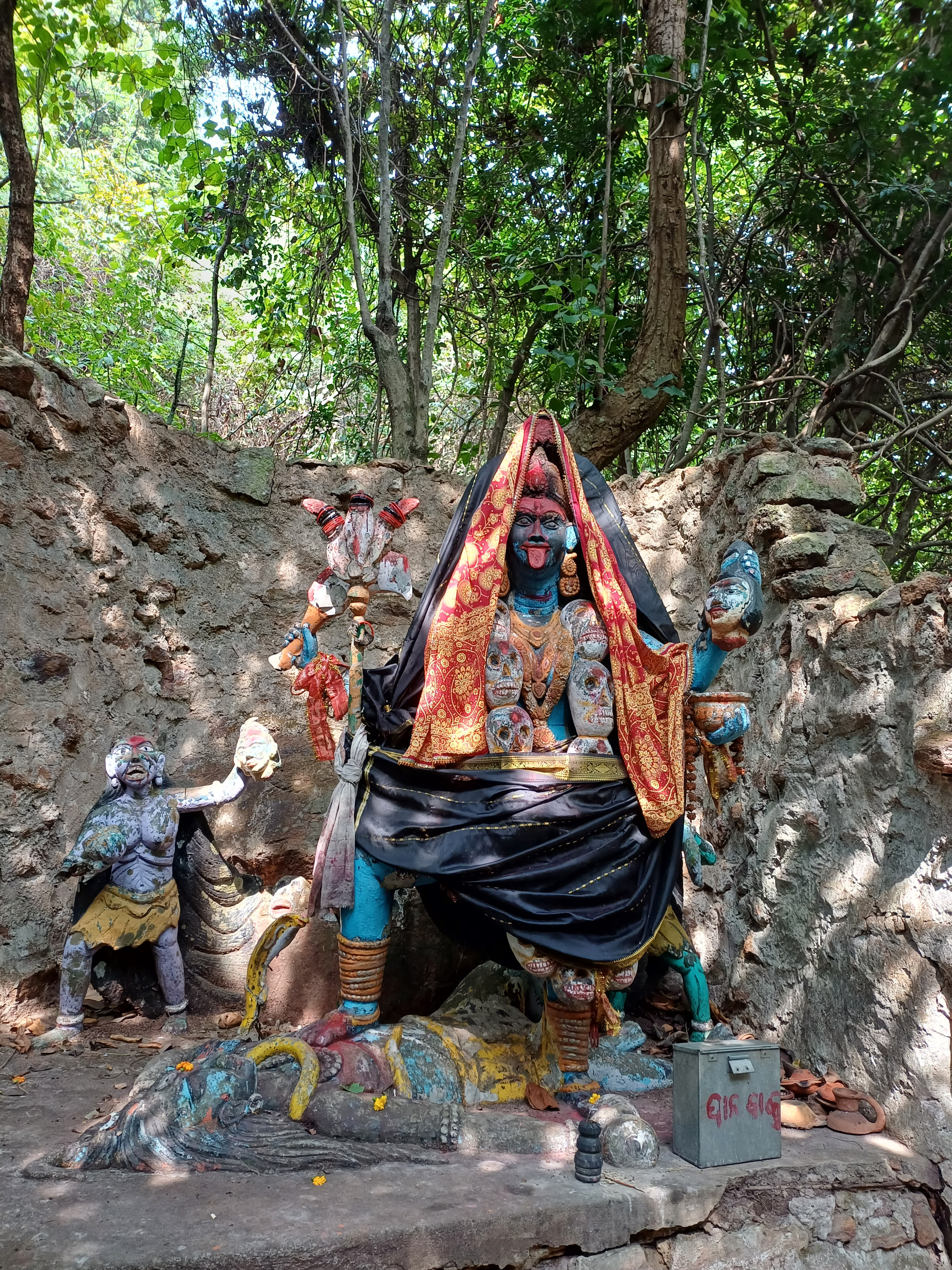

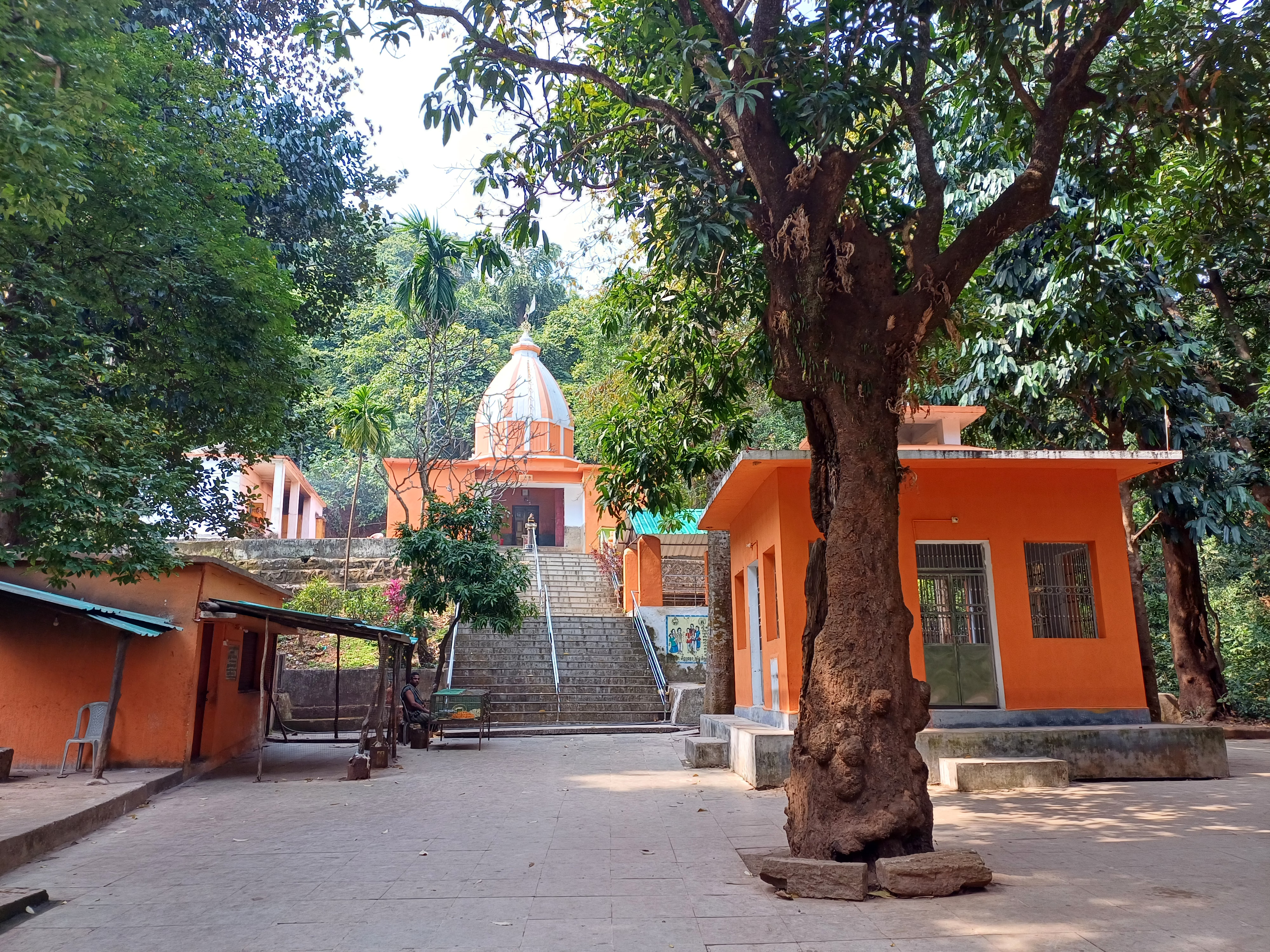

== See also ==
- Sapthagiri
