= Pradipta Kumar Naik =

Indian politician

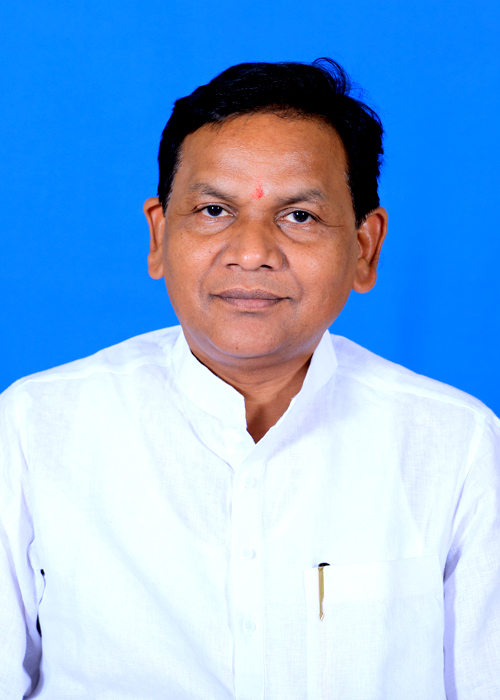

Leader of the Opposition Odisha Legislative Assembly
- In office 25 June 2019 – 30 July 2022
- Chief Minister: Naveen Patnaik
- Preceded by: Narasingha Mishra
- Succeeded by: Jayanarayan Mishra

Minister of Labour & Employment Government of Odisha
- In office 5 February 2008 – 19 May 2009
- Chief Minister: Naveen Patnaik
- In office 18 May 2004 – 29 April 2006
- Chief Minister: Naveen Patnaik

Member of Odisha Legislative Assembly
- In office 2019–2024
- Preceded by: Anam Naik
- Succeeded by: Sagar Charan Das
- Constituency: Bhawanipatna
- In office 1995–2009
- Preceded by: Dusmanta Naik
- Succeeded by: Ajit Das
- Constituency: Bhawanipatna

Personal details
- Born: 14 June 1966 (age 59) Bhawanipatna, Odisha, India
- Party: Bharatiya Janata Party
- Spouse: Pramila Naik
- Children: 3 son
- Parent: Kirshani Naik (father)
- Education: Bachelor of Arts; Bachelor of Laws
- Alma mater: Sambalpur University
- Profession: Advocate, Politician

Pradipta Kumar Naik (born 14 June 1966) is an Indian politician. He won the Vidhan sabha seat of Bhawanipatna Odisha four times with two times as Minister in Odisha. He became a Member of the Legislative Assembly in 1995 at the very young age of 27. He was elected to the Odisha Legislative Assembly from Bhawanipatna in the 2019 Odisha Legislative Assembly election as a member of the BJP. He is Leader of Opposition in Odisha Legislative Assembly.
