= Mousadhi Bag =

Indian politician

Member of the Odisha Legislative Assembly
- Incumbent
- Assumed office April 2019
- Preceded by: Puspendra Singh Deo
- Constituency: Dharmagarh

Personal details
- Born: Majhiguda, Kalahandi district, Odisha
- Party: Biju Janata Dal
- Education: Master of Education, Sambalpur University
- Profession: Politician, teacher

Mousadhi Bag is a politician from Odisha in India. He is currently serving as Member of Legislative Assembly of Dharmagarh after being elected in the 2019 Odisha Legislative Assembly election.

== Early life ==
Mr. Bag was born to Keshab Bag in a Hindu Gopal (Yadav) family of Majhiguda village (Kalahandi).

State Legislative Assembly
Preceded by Puspendra Singh Deo (BJD)	Member of the Odisha Legislative Assembly from Dharmagarh Assembly constituency 2019–	Incumbent
