= Bihar Board of Open Schooling and Examination =

State open school board

The Bihar Board of Open Schooling and Examination(BBOSE) is the board of education for open education, which is administered by the Government of Bihar.

== See also ==
- Bihar School Examination Board
