= Bhakta Charan Das =

Indian politician (born 1958), Advocate & Journalist

President Odisha Pradesh Congress Committee
- Incumbent
- Assumed office 11 February 2025
- Preceded by: Sarat Pattanayak

Member of Parliament, Lok Sabha
- In office 2009–2014
- Preceded by: Bikram Keshari Deo
- Succeeded by: Arka Keshari Deo
- Constituency: Kalahandi
- In office 1996–1998
- Preceded by: Subhash Chandra Nayak
- Succeeded by: Bikram Keshari Deo
- Constituency: Kalahandi
- In office 1989–1991
- Preceded by: Jagannath Patnaik
- Succeeded by: Subhash Chandra Nayak
- Constituency: Kalahandi

Member of Odisha Legislative Assembly
- In office 1985–1990
- Preceded by: Dayanidhi Naik
- Succeeded by: Ajit Das
- Constituency: Bhawanipatna

Minister of State in Ministry of Railways Government of India
- In office 21 November 1990 – 21 June 1991
- Prime Minister: Chandra Shekhar

Deputy Minister Ministry of Youth Affairs & Sports (India)
- In office 23 April 1990 – 5 November 1990
- Prime Minister: V. P. Singh

Personal details
- Born: 26 November 1958 (age 67) Bhawanipatna, Odisha, India
- Spouse: Sunanda Das
- Children: Sagar Charan Das
- Parents: Dibakar Das (father); Bilasha Das (mother)
- Education: B.A., LL.B.
- Alma mater: Sambalpur University
- Profession: Politician, Advocate, Journalist

Bhakta Charan Das (born 26 November 1958) is an Indian politician, advocate and former Minister of State in the Ministry of Railways in India hailing from the state of Odisha. He served as a Member of Parliament in the 15th Lok Sabha, representing the Kalahandi constituency. Das has served as a Minister of State under two prime ministers of India, they being V.P Singh and Chandra Shekhar.

He is currently the President of Odisha Pradesh Congress Committee the provincial outfit of the Indian National Congress party. He is active in electoral politics and had contest for the Odisha Legislative Assembly in 2024 from Narla Assembly Constituency. Though having been placed at second position Bhakta managed an overall 12% increase in the voteshare of the Congress in Narla.

Apart from electoral politics Das is a noted and influential social activist who has been fighting for the rights of both Scheduled Caste & Scheduled Tribe peoples of Odisha through numerous social movements and people engaging activities.

As President of the Odisha Pradesh Congress Committee he has been vocal in raising many issues which have plaguing the people of Odisha. Currently in his tenure as president the state unit of the Congress Party has conducted numerous outreach programs (padayatras), rallies, protests, state-wide strikes and protests in the Odisha Legislative Assembly to highlight the woes of the people of Odisha.

== Political career ==
=== Parliament and Ministry ===
Das contested the 1989 Lok Sabha election from the Kalahandi Lok Sabha Constituency as a candidate of the Janata Party. He was later appointed Deputy Minister of Sports and Youth Affairs in the Union Government under Prime Minister V.P. Singh later being elevated as a Minister of State in the Ministry of Railways of India.

== Personal life ==
Bhakta is married to Sunanda Das and together they have two sons Kranti being the elder and Sagar Charan Das being the younger sibling who is also currently a lawmaker representing the Bhawanipatna Assembly Constituency in the Legislative Assembly of Odisha.

== See also ==
- Kalahandi (Lok Sabha constituency)
- Indian general election in Orissa, 2009
- Indian National Congress
- Odisha Pradesh Congress Committee
