= Adhiraj Mohan Panigrahi =

Indian politician

Member of Odisha Legislative Assembly
- Incumbent
- Assumed office 23 May 2019
- Preceded by: Duryodhan Majhi
- Constituency: Khariar

Personal details
- Born: 14 July 1976 (age 49) Khariar, Odisha, India
- Party: Biju Janata Dal (2024 - Present)
- Other political affiliations: Indian National Congress
- Spouse: Priyadassini Panigrahi
- Children: 1 Son
- Education: Graduate
- Profession: Social worker, Producer, Politician

Adhiraj Mohan Panigrahi (born 14 July 1976) is an Indian politician from Odisha, currently serving as an MLA in the Odisha Legislative Assembly. He was elected to the 16th and 17th Odisha Legislative Assembly from the Khariar Assembly constituency in 2019 and 2024, respectively.

== Early life ==
Panigrahi is from Khariar in Nuapada district.

== Political career ==
In the 2014 assembly elections, he was defeated in the Khariar Vidhan Sabha constituency by BJP candidate Duryodhan Majhi. However, in 2019, he was successfully elected as an MLA from INC. Before the assembly elections 2024, he resigned from INC and joined BJD, subsequently winning as an MLA from BJD.
