= Balsi =

Balsi, Kesinga
- Village
- Location in Odisha, India Balsi, Kesinga (India)
- Coordinates: 20.2°N 83.23°E
- Country: India
- State: Odisha
- District: Kalahandi
- Established: 1857
- Named for: Balsi

Government
  - Type: Panchayat
  - Body: Panchayat
  - Rank: 1st
- Elevation: 2,000 m (6,600 ft)

Population (2011)
  - Total: 3,169

Languages
  - Official: Odia, Odia
- Time zone: UTC+5:30 (IST)
- Postal code: 766012
- Vehicle registration: OD 08

Balsi is a village in Kesinga Block Kalahandi district in the India state of Odisha, near the east coast of India. This Village belongs to Odisha.

== Location ==
Balsi village is in Kesinga block of Kalahandi district in Odisha. It is one of the 4 villages of Balsi Panchayat of Kalahandi district. As per the administration register, the village number of Balsi is 422360. The village has 510 homes. According to Census 2011, Balsi's population is 3169. Out of this, 60% are males while the females count 40% here. This village has 254 kids in the age group of 0–6 years. Out of this 134 are boys and 120 are girls.

The nearest village of this Panchayat is

1. Balsi
2. Rengali
3. Kokodmal
4. Masanibandha

== Geography ==
Balsi is located at 20.2°N 83.23°E. It has an average elevation of 187 metres (614 ft).Another landmark of Balsi is Kandadangar Hill (old mountain) at the Last of the Village. This mountain has a profound effect on the climate of Balsi.

== Transport ==
Kandel Road Railway Station is the major railhead in Balsi Village. It is 12 km nearest considered as the gateway of Kalahandi.

National Highway 26 passes through the Kesinga. Balsi is well connected to major cities and towns in Odisha. Balsi to Kesinga is 14 kilometres (8.7 mi) by the road of PMGSY.

== Economy ==
Balsi noted for Peda and Khuaa. Apart from being a railhead for the region, Kesinga also serves as the place of enormous business activity. It is the economic heart of the surrounding area, where farmers can get a fair price for produce. There are scores of rice mills in Kesinga. A godown of FCI gives the storage facility for farmers and rice mill owners.

== Schools and colleges ==
Balsi High School, Balsi is the Purely oldest School in Balsi Panchayat & it is also known as JUVP, Balsi The Nearest School of Balsi Panchayat Government Girls High School Kesinga and Kesinga Vidyapitha Kesinga.

Nearest College in Balsi Panchayat

Kesinga Mahavidyalaya is the oldest college in the Kesinga region. It is affiliated by ||Sambalpur University|| Art's and Science. The school offers Honors in Degrees for both the Arts and Sciences. Other colleges, Narla and Muskuti college are the ones nearest to Balsi.

== Language and literature ==
The language spoken by the people of Kalahandi is the Kalahandia dialect of Oriya, locally known as Kalahandia . Local weekly newspapers such as Arjji and Kalahandi Express publish articles in standard Odia and Kalahandia language. Other languages include Kui, Bhatri (another dialect of Odia), Parji, Bhunjia, spoken by approximately 7000 Bhunjia Adivasis.

== Areas of Balsi ==
1. Member pada
2. Mandir Pada
3. Sundhi Pada
4. Upar Pada
5. Gaud Pada
6. Tarini Pada
7. Harijan Pada
8. Tulsi pada

Village area of Balsi includes nearby sub-urban areas like Masanibandha, Station area, Kesinga road, Rengali, Rupra Road, Rayagada, Rampur, Narla, Vishakapatnam and Koraput.
