= Sagar Charan Das =

Indian politician

Member of Odisha Legislative Assembly
- Incumbent
- Assumed office 4 Jun 2024
- Preceded by: Pradipta Kumar Naik
- Constituency: Bhawanipatna

Personal details
- Born: Bhawanipatna , Odisha India
- Party: Indian National Congress
- Parents: Bhakta Charan Das (father); Sunanda Das (mother)
- Education: Kalinga Institute of Industrial Technology

Sagar Charan Das is an Indian politician from Odisha. He is a Member of the Odisha Legislative Assembly from 2024, representing Bhawanipatna Assembly constituency as a Member of the Indian National Congress.

== See also ==
- 2024 Odisha Legislative Assembly election
- Odisha Legislative Assembly
