= Dibya Shankar Mishra =

Indian politician

Member of Odisha Legislative Assembly
- Incumbent
- Assumed office 26 May 2014
- Preceded by: Dibya Shankar Mishra
- Constituency: Junagarh

Personal details
- Party: Biju Janata Dal
- Profession: Politician

Dibya Shankar Mishra is an Indian politician who was elected to the Odisha Legislative Assembly from Junagarh as a member of the Biju Janata Dal.
