= Krushna Chandra Patra =

Indian politician

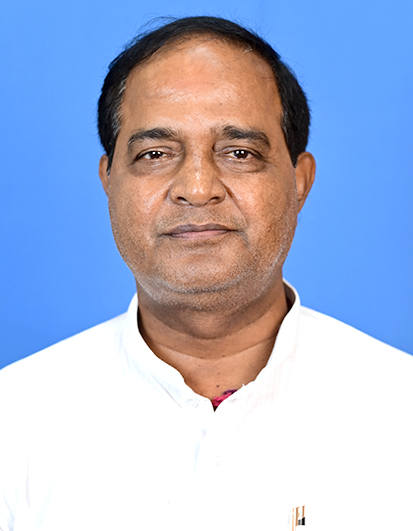

Minister of Food Supplies & Consumer Welfare Government of Odisha
- Incumbent
- Assumed office 12 June 2024
- Chief Minister: Mohan Charan Majhi
- Preceded by: Atanu Sabyasachi Nayak

Minister of Science & Technology Government of Odisha
- Incumbent
- Assumed office 12 June 2024
- Chief Minister: Mohan Charan Majhi
- Preceded by: Ashok Chandra Panda

Member of Odisha Legislative Assembly
- Incumbent
- Assumed office 2024
- Preceded by: Sudhir Kumar Samal
- Constituency: Dhenkanal
- In office 2000–2004
- Preceded by: Nabin Chandra Narayan Das
- Succeeded by: Sudhir Kumar Samal
- Constituency: Dhenkanal

Personal details
- Born: 25 February 1964 (age 61)
- Party: Bharatiya Janata Party
- Spouse: Gita Patra
- Parent: Madhusudan Patra (father)
- Education: Master of Science; Bachelor of Laws
- Profession: Businessman, Politician

Krushna Chandra Patra is an Indian politician and Minister of Food Suppliers, Consumer Welfare, Science & Technology Government of Odisha. He is a member of the Member of Odisha Legislative Assembly from Dhenkanal assembly constituency of Dhenkanal district.

He did his M.Sc. from Utkal University in 1988, and LLB, Utkal University in 1992.

On 12 June 2024, he took oath along with Chief Minister Mohan Charan Majhi took oath in Janata Maidan, Bhubaneswar. Governor Raghubar Das administered their oath. Prime Minister Narendra Modi, Home Minister Amit Shah, Defense Minister Rajnath Singh, along with Chief Ministers of 10 BJP-ruled states were present.
