= Narla Assembly constituency =

Constituency of the Odisha legislative assembly in India

Coordinates: 20.06°N 83.38°E

Narla
- Constituency No. 81 for the Odisha Legislative Assembly

Constituency details
- Country: India
- Region: East India
- State: Odisha
- Division: Southern Division
- District: Kalahandi
- Lok Sabha constituency: Kalahandi
- Established: 1967
- Total electors: 2,32,083 (Note: as on 2024) (Note: as data published by election commission)
- Reservation: None

Member of Legislative Assembly
- 17th Odisha Legislative Assembly
- Incumbent Manorama Mohanty
- Party: Biju Janata Dal
- Elected year: 2024

Narla is a Vidhan Sabha constituency of Kalahandi district, Odisha. After 2008 Delimitation, Kesinga Assembly constituency was subsumed into this constituency.

This constituency includes Narla block, Karlamunda block, Madanpur-Rampur block and 9 Gram panchayats (Belkhandi, Hatikhoj, Kantesir, Kashurpada, Nunmath, Paralsingha, Sirjapalli, Tundla and Turlakhman) of Kesinga block.

== Elected members ==
Vote share of winning candidates
2024	36.47%
2019	31.12%
2014	37.73%
2009	36.32%
2004	49.53%
2000	55.22%
1995	36.27%
1990	63.91%
1985	53.16%
1980	56.02%
1977	47.41%

Since its formation in 1967, 14 elections were held till date.

List of members elected from Narla constituency are:

Year	Member	Party
2024	Manorama Mohanty	Biju Janata Dal
2019	Bhupinder Singh	Biju Janata Dal
2014	Dhaneswar Majhi	Biju Janata Dal
2009	Bhupinder Singh	Indian National Congress
2004	Balabhadra Majhi	Biju Janata Dal
2000	Balabhadra Majhi	Biju Janata Dal
1995	Balabhadra Majhi	Janata Dal
1990	Balabhadra Majhi	Janata Dal
1985	Kumara Mani Sabar	Indian National Congress
1980	Tejraj Majhi	Indian National Congress (I)
1977	Tejraj Majhi	Indian National Congress
1974	Dhaneswar Majhi	Swatantra Party
1971	Dhaneswar Majhi	Swatantra Party
1967	Anchal Majhi	Swatantra Party

== Election results ==
=== 2024 ===
Voting were held on 13 May 2024 in 1st phase of Odisha Assembly Election & 4th phase of Indian General Election. Counting of votes was on 4 June 2024. In 2024 election, Biju Janata Dal candidate Manorama Mohanty defeated Indian National Congress candidate Bhakta Charan Das by a margin of 5,205 votes.

2024 Odisha Vidhan Sabha Election, Narla
Party	Candidate	Votes	%	±%
BJD	Manorama Mohanty	67,532	36.47	▲5.35
INC	Bhakta Charan Das	62,327	33.66	▲12.77
BJP	Aniruddha Padhan	47,417	25.61	▼0.24
NOTA	None of the above	1,300	0.7	
Majority		5,205	2.81	
Turnout		1,85,154	79.78	
BJD gain from				

=== 2019 ===
In 2019 election, Biju Janata Dal candidate Bhupinder Singh defeated Bharatiya Janata Party candidate Aniruddha Padhan by a margin of 15,768 votes.

2019 Vidhan Sabha Election, Narla
Party	Candidate	Votes	%	±%
BJD	Bhupinder Singh	53,264	31.12	▼6.61
BJP	Aniruddha Padhan	44,244	25.85	▲4.71
INC	Chittaranjan Mandal	35,753	20.89	▼6.36
NOTA	None of the above	1,236	0.72	
Majority		15,768	10.48	
Turnout		1,71,139	79	
BJD hold				

=== 2014 ===
In 2014 election, Biju Janata Dal candidate Dhaneswar Majhi defeated Indian National Congress candidate Jagannath Pattnayak by a margin of 15,768 votes.

2014 Vidhan Sabha Election, Narla
Party	Candidate	Votes	%	±%
BJD	Dhaneswar Majhi	56,783	37.73	−
INC	Jagannath Pattnayak	41,015	27.25	▼9.07
BJP	Artatrana Mohapatra	31,809	21.14	▲4.91
NOTA	None of the above	583	0.39	−
Majority		15,768	10.47	
Turnout		1,50,496	76.76	▲5.65
Registered electors		1,96,059		
BJD gain from INC				

=== 2009 ===
In 2009 election, Indian National Congress candidate Bhupinder Singh defeated Bharatiya Janata Party candidate Srikant Hota by a margin of 27,512 votes.

2009 Vidhan Sabha Election, Narla
Party	Candidate	Votes	%	±%
INC	Bhupinder Singh	49,748	36.32	−
BJP	Srikant Hota	22,236	16.23	−
Independent	Nilamani Sahu	17,044	12.44	−
NCP	Zakir Hussain	16,712	12.20	−
Majority		27,512	20.08 (Note: % of total valid votes)	−
Turnout		1,37,021	71.11	−
INC gain from BJD				
