= Duryodhan Majhi =

Indian politician

Member of Odisha Legislative Assembly
- In office 2014–2019
- Preceded by: Hitesh Kumar Bagartti
- Succeeded by: Adhiraj Mohan Panigrahi
- Constituency: Khariar
- In office 1990–2004
- Preceded by: Anupa Singh Deo
- Succeeded by: Hitesh Kumar Bagartti
- Constituency: Khariar

Personal details
- Born: 14 April 1938 (age 88) Khariar, Odisha, India
- Died: 11 January 2022 Khariar
- Party: Biju Janta Dal
- Other political affiliations: Bharatiya Janata Party
- Education: Ravenshaw University
- Profession: Politician

Duryodhan Majhi Duryodhan Majhi was an Indian politician. He was elected to the Odisha Legislative Assembly from Khariar, Odisha in the 1990, 1995, 2000, 2004 and 2014 as a member of the Biju Janata Dal.

== Biography ==
Majhi was a member of the Odisha Legislative Assembly from Khariar constituency in Nuapada district. He was five times MLA from Khariar constituency. He was first elected to Odisha Legislative Assembly in 1990 as a member of Janata Dal and again in 1995. Later he was elected as a member of Biju Janata Dal in 2000 and 2004 and as a member of Bharathiya Janata Party in 2009. He served as Minister of State for Information and Public Relations, Minister of State for Health, Family Welfare Minister of Planning and Coordination and Minister of State for Science and Technology between 2000 and 2009. He resigned from Biju Janata Dal in 2014 and fought 2014 Odisha Legislative Assembly election from the ticket of BJP. He was elected as a MLA in 2014 election. Just before the Odisha Vidhan Sabha election in 2019, he resigned from Bharatiya Janata Party and rejoined Biju Janata Dal. Majhi died in Bhubaneswar on 11 January 2022, at the age of 83.
