= Nabin Nanda =

Indian politician

Nabin Nanda is political leader of Dhenkanal District, Odisha. He was born to a lower middle class lower Brahmin family in the year 1959. He started his political career as Sarpanch of his home Gram Panchayat Deogan and now he is well known as a political stalwart of Joranda as well as in Gondia. He fought four assembly elections and won two times to state assembly as MLA from Gondia and Dhenkanal.

As usual, during his tenure as MLA, he tried to raise such issues as the widening of Dhenkanal to Bhapur Road, establishment of cold storage, 100 bedded medical at Dhenkanal town, Cremation Centre at Sriramchandrapur CHC, 33/11 kV electrical grid at Tolarposi Chaak, Pingua, establishment of the fire station at Sarakapatana of Chhadesh area of Dhenkanal Sadar Block, construction of Bisnupur Adibandha at Bhapur Grampanchayat, Baji Rout Setu (Bridge) over the river Bramhani at Mandar, second bypass road from Shyamacharanpur to Bhagabanpur etc. Some of these works were completed during his tenure as MLA.
