= Kesinga =

- Town
- Location in Odisha, India Kesinga (India)
- Coordinates: 20.2°N 83.23°E
- Country: India
- State: Odisha
- District: Kalahandi

Government
  - Body: N.A.C.
- Elevation: 187 m (614 ft)

Population (2001)
  - Total: 16,914

Languages
  - Official: Odia
- Time zone: UTC+5:30 (IST)
- Postal code: 766012
- Vehicle registration: OD 08
- Website: kalahandi.nic.in

Kesinga is a town and a notified area committee in Kalahandi district in the Indian state of Odisha, near India's east coast. It is also called the gate to Kalahandi. Kesinga is rich in agriculture, small industries, and start-ups as well.

== Geography ==
Kesinga is situated at 20.2°N 83.23°E and has an average elevation of 187 metres (614 feet). The rivers Tel and Uteh converge not far from Kesinga, providing fertile ground for summer sand crops such as cucumber and watermelon. Another landmark of Kesinga is the Buddhadangar, an old mountain in the town center. This mountain significantly influences the climate of Kesinga.

== Transport ==
Kesinga is the major railhead in the Kalahandi district. It is considered the gateway of Kalahandi.

National Highway 26 passes through the town. Kesinga is well connected to major cities and towns in Odisha. Kesinga to Balsi is 12 kilometres (7.5 mi) by the road of PMGSY.

== Village in Kesinga Block ==
Balsi, Kandel and Kurlupada are villages in Kesinga block of Kalahandi district in Odisha. Boringpadar is the neighbour village of Kesinga. Positioned in a rural area of the Kalahandi district of Odisha, it is among the 106 villages of Kesinga block of Kalahandi district. As per the administration register, the village number of Balsi is 422360. The village has 510 homes. According to Census 2011, Balsi's population is 1799, of which 888 are women, and 911 are men. This village has 254 kids in the age group of 0-6 years, of which 120 are girls, and 134 are boys.

== Economy ==
In addition to being a regional railhead, Kesinga is an economic center with numerous rice mills and a marketplace where farmers sell their produce. A godown of FCI provides farmers and rice mill owners with a storage solution.

== Industries ==
Kesinga has a handful of small and middle-scale industries providing goods from daily needs to industrial applications to the state of Odisha and nearby states. Many rice mills are operating in Kurlupada and Bagad region.

== School and College in Kesinga ==
Kesinga Vidyapitha, Kesinga is the oldest school in Kesinga. It is also known as Boys' High School.

Government Girls' High School Kesinga is the oldest school.

Kesinga Mahavidyalaya, Kesinga is oldest College in Kesinga Region Kalahandi District. It is affiliated by Sambalpur University Art's All Hons Subject Available Here. Numerous private institutions are also operating here; the leading ones are Saraswati Shishu Vidyamandir, Young Blood Public School, The Dronacharya School, Little Genius School and many more.
