= Pratap Keshari Deo =

Indian politician (1919–2001)

Member of Parliament, Lok Sabha
- In office 1957–1980
- Preceded by: Giridhari Bhoi
- Succeeded by: Rasa Behari Behara
- Constituency: Kalahandi, Odisha

Personal details
- Born: 5 October 1919 Bhawanipatna, Odisha, British India
- Died: 8 October 2001 (aged 82) New Delhi, India

Maharaja Pratap Keshari Deo (5 October 1919 – 8 October 2001) was an Indian politician. He was the last ruler of Kalahandi State from 1939 to 1947. Post-independence, he was elected from the Kalahandi constituency in Odisha to the Lower House of the Indian Parliament the Lok Sabha. He was deputy Leader of the Opposition, Orissa Legislative Assembly, 1952—1956.

== Maharaja of Kalahandi State ==
During the time Deo ruled Kalahandi, a major irrigation project was initiated on the Indravati River to build Indravati Dam, and along with engineer Bhubaneswar Behera and administrator Ram Chandra Patra he visualized and prepared the blueprint. This plan was disrupted by governmental changes in the early post-independence period. In 1948 Kalahandi lost its state status and was merged into Odisha

== Political career ==
Deo was a Member of Orissa Legislative Assembly and subsequently of the Lok Sabha. As a member of Swatantra Party Deo aligned with Rajendra Narayan Singh Deo who became the chief minister in 1967.

Deo initiated Kalahandi Science College in 1960, the predecessor of Kalahandi University.

As a member of parliament, Deo continued to push for the Indravati Dam and rail connectivity from Kesinga to Ambaguda via Bhawanipatna and Junagarh. In 1962-1963 he had pointed out in the Parliament that Parkers had done a railway line survey from Kesinga to Nabarangpur to join Kothavalasa-Kirandul (KK) line, because Koraput-Kothavalasa and Koraput-Rayagada are e-special category railway routes having many tunnels and high-level bridges; the speed is limited (often less than 50 kmph) and number of wagon can’t exceed 30 during mineral transportations in these two routes. Subsequently, Lanjigarh–Junagarh section under East Coast Railway Zone was completed in March 2014, which was sanctioned when local MP Bhakta Charan Das was minister of state for railway in 1990-91.

Deo had a special interest in archeology and established the archeology society of Kalahandi.

Deo died in New Delhi on 8 October 2001, at the age of 82.
