= Kalahandi (disambiguation) =

Kalahandi is a district of Odisha in India.

Kalahandi may also refer to:

- Kalahandi (Lok Sabha constituency), Parliament of India constituency covering the district
- Kalahandi State, a former princely state of India in the present-day district during the British Raj
- Kalahandi, an Odia dialect spoken in the district
- Kalahandi (poem), a Sahitya Akademi award winning Odia poem by Tapan Kumar Pradhan
