= Mukhiguda =

- Town
- Location in Odisha, India Mukhiguda (India)
- Coordinates: 19°28′20″N 82°59′50″E
- Country: India
- State: Odisha
- District: Kalahandi

Population (2001)
  - Total: 1,910

Languages
  - Official: Odia
- Time zone: UTC+5:30 (IST)
- PIN: 766026
- Sex ratio: 48.4:51.6 ♂/♀
- Website: odisha.gov.in
- It is home to India's largest power house

Mukhiguda is a census town in Kalahandi district in the Indian state of Odisha. Mukhiguda is one of the villages in Jayapatna tehsil. Mukhiguda is 7 km from its tehsil's main town, Jaipatna, is located 87 km from its district's main city, Bhawanipatna, and is located 510 km (320 mi) from its state's main city Bhubaneswar.

== History ==
Mukhiguda is famous for Indravati Power Plant, which is one of India's largest and Asia's second-largest power house. The hydro-electric project of Odisha produces 600 MW electricity and took almost 15 years for its completion. Now 1 MW solar project was completed and Running in Year 2022. And Generated Power given to TPWODL.

== Updates ==
1. New Administrative Building of Indravati Power Plant will make work processed and continue in March 2022.This 3 storey building has been made approximately Two years. Building have Canteen, GYM, Central AC facility.

2. Slowly one of the Pump Storage Power (PSP) plant also making work will processed.

== Demographics ==
As of 2001 India census, Mukhiguda had a population of 1,910. Males constitute 9,24 of the population and females 9,86.In Mukhiguda total literacy population is 6,69, So Mukhiguda has an average literacy rate of 35%, smaller than the national average of 59.5%: male literacy is 76%, and female literacy is 24%. In Mukhiguda, 13% of the population is under 6 years of age.

== Education ==
=== Schools ===
- Upper primary Project school
- Upper Indravati Project High school
- Saraswati sishu vidya mandir
- Swami Vivekananda English medium school
- venkateswar an english medium school

=== Colleges ===
- Indravati Mahavidyalaya

== See also ==
- Kalahandi district
- Bhawanipatna
- Jaipatna
- Junagarh
