= Girdhari Bhoi =

Indian politician

Member of Parliament, Lok Sabha
- In office 1952-1957
- Succeeded by: Pratap Keshari Deo
- Constituency: Kalahandi-Bolangir, Odisha

Personal details
- Born: 2 April 1903 Chiapadar, Kalahandi District, Orissa, British India
- Party: Ganatantra Parishad
- Spouse: Rambha Dei

Girdhari Bhoi was an Indian politician who belonged to Ganatantra Parishad. He was elected to the Lok Sabha, the lower house of the Parliament of India from Kalahandi-Bolangir, Odisha.
