= Ram Chandra Patra =

First IAS officer of kalahandi, odisha, India

Ram Chandra Patra, IAS (retd.), first Indian Administrative Service (IAS) members from Kalahandi, was a bureaucrat, social worker, and administrator from Kalahandi district in Orissa. He was born in Dharamgarh on 24 April 1919 of Kalahandi district and died in 2013. He obtained his B.A. degree from Patna University in 1937 and was the only candidate getting honours. Subsequently, he received first class in LL.B from Allahabad University in 1943 and worked as deputy collector, treasury officer, SDO & SDM in the erstwhile Kalahandi state. While working for the princely Kalahandi State he took various initiatives for development of roads in Kalahandi. Along with the idea of Professor Bhubaneswar Behera, Maharaja Pratap Kishore Deo and he took initiative for Indravati dam.

When Kalahandi lost its princely state status and joined union of India as a constituent he joined as civil servant to the Indian Government through UPSC test for Orissa, Bihar and Madhya Pradesh. He was among the first IAS employees from Kalahandi. During his career at the IAS he did not get opportunity to work in Kalahandi. After retiring he was involved in social work with poor people. He was among the first to take initiative to establish Panchayat College Dharamgarh in 1980 and served as first President to the college administrative board. He was members of various developmental committee of Kalahandi after his retirement. Despite serving as a commissioner to various Department of Orissa Government, Patra has lived a simple village life like Gandhi after his retirement in his home village of gambhariguda.

During LL.B Patra met all political leaders like Mohandas Karamchand Gandhi, Jawaharlal Nehru, Muhammad Ali Jinnah, Vallabhbhai Patel, Abul Kalam Azad, Dr. Rajendra Prasad, C. Rajagopalachari, Subhas Chandra Bose, Sarojini Naidu etc., attended AICC/Muslim/Hindu Maha Sabha Silver Jubilee, Banaras Hindu University. As student of Ravenshwa College attended Mahatma Gandhi's visit to Delang in Puri district in 1938, as a Sevadal member and joined in the procession to welcome Subash Chandra Bose the then president of Congress on an elephant at Cuttack. He also participated in Quit India movement in the year 1942. Since retirement, Patra is working for the upliftment of sick and poor of Kalahandi district and augmenting funds to the red cross society. Being a son of soil, his personality has been covered by various major media such as Samaja, Sambad including leading TV channels like ETV Oriya. He worked as a civil servant in the aftermath of natural calamities that hit Kendrapada region.
