= Maa Manikeshwari University =

University in Odisha, India

- Former name: Kalahandi University (2020–2023)
- Motto: Satyam Gyanam Bruhat
- Type: Public
- Established: July 18, 1960; 66 years ago (as college); September 1, 2020; 5 years ago (as University)
- Affiliations: UGC
- Chancellor: Governor of Odisha
- Vice-Chancellor: Pawan Kumar Agrawal
- Location: Bhawanipatna, Odisha, India; 19°55′09″N 83°10′27″E
- Campus: Urban (96.47 acres)
- Website: kalahandiuniversity.ac.in

Maa Manikeshwari University (erstwhile Kalahandi University) is a state public university located in Bhawanipatna, the district headquarters of Kalahandi district of Odisha, India

== History ==
The University started as Kalahandi Science College on 18 July 1960 under private management till 30 September 1961. It was taken over by the Government of Odisha on 1 December 1961 as Government Science College. The degree classes started in 1982. It was conferred with the status of an autonomous educational institution in 2002. On 1 September 2020, it was upgraded to an affiliating university by the Odisha state government as Kalahandi University. The University serves as a higher educational centre in the KBK (Kalahandi-Bolangir-Koraput) region.

On 28 December 2023, Odisha CM Naveen Patnaik approved to change the name of University to Maa Manikeshwari University

== Academics ==
The Institution offers UG, PG and P.H.D courses in 16 different subjects.

- Anthropology
- Botany
- Chemistry
- Commerce
- Economics
- Education
- English
- Geography
- History
- Mathematics
- Odia
- Physics
- Political Science
- Sanskrit
- Sociology
- Zoology

== Affiliated colleges ==
The university has jurisdiction over colleges in Kalahandi and Nuapada district.

| Name | Location |
|---|---|
| +3 Degree College Karlapada, Kalahandi | Kalahandi |
| Chandrika Jain Degree College, Borda, Kalahandi | Kalahandi |
| Dharamgarh Women’s College | Kalahandi |
| Government Women’s College, Bhawanipatna, Kalahandi | Kalahandi |
| Indrabati Mahavidyalaya (+3 stream) Jaipatna, Kalahandi | Kalahandi |
| Jay Prakash Sandhya Mahavidyalay Bhawanipatna, Kalahandi | Kalahandi |
| Jagannath Degree College, Risida | Kalahandi |
| Kalahandi Training College, Bhawanipatna | Kalahandi |
| Kesinga Mahavidyalaya, Kesinga, Kalahandi | Kalahandi |
| Maa Heera Neela Degree Mahavidyalaya, Biswanathpur, Kalahandi | Kalahandi |
| Madanpur Rampur College, M.Rampur, Kalahandi | Kalahandi |
| Maharani Kasturika Modini Devi (+3) Mahavidyalaya Kalampur, Kalahandi | Kalahandi |
| Panchyat College, Dharamgarh, Kalahandi | Kalahandi |
| Panchyat Mahavidyalaya (Degree College) Belkhandi, Kalahandi | Kalahandi |
| Panchayat Samiti College, Koksara, Kalahandi | Kalahandi |
| Panchayat Samiti Degree College, Narla, Kalahandi | Kalahandi |
| Priyadarshini Indira Degree College, Junagarh, Kalahandi | Kalahandi |
| Sarbamangala Degree College, Golamunda, Kalahandi | Kalahandi |
| Anchalik Bastareni Degree Mahavidyalaya, Sanchergaon, Kalahandi | Kalahandi |
| Amar Mahavidyalaya, Kusurla, Kalahandi | Kalahandi |
| Saraswati Institute of Information Technology, Bhawanipatna, Kalahandi (waiting affiliation) | Kalahandi |
| +3 Degree College, Sinapali, Nuapada | Nuapada |
| Shree Sai Degree College, Kurumpuri, Nuapada | Nuapada |
| Biju Patnaik Degree College, Boden, Nuapada | Nuapada |
| Kshyama Meher Degree College, Tukla, Nuapada | Nuapada |
| Khariar College, Khariar, Nuapada | Nuapada |
| Lokadrusti College of advance Technology (LCAT) Godramunda, Nuapada | Nuapada |
| National College, Nuapada | Nuapada |
Panchayat Samiti 3 DegreeCollege, Komna, Nuapada
