= Kalahandi district =

- District of Odisha
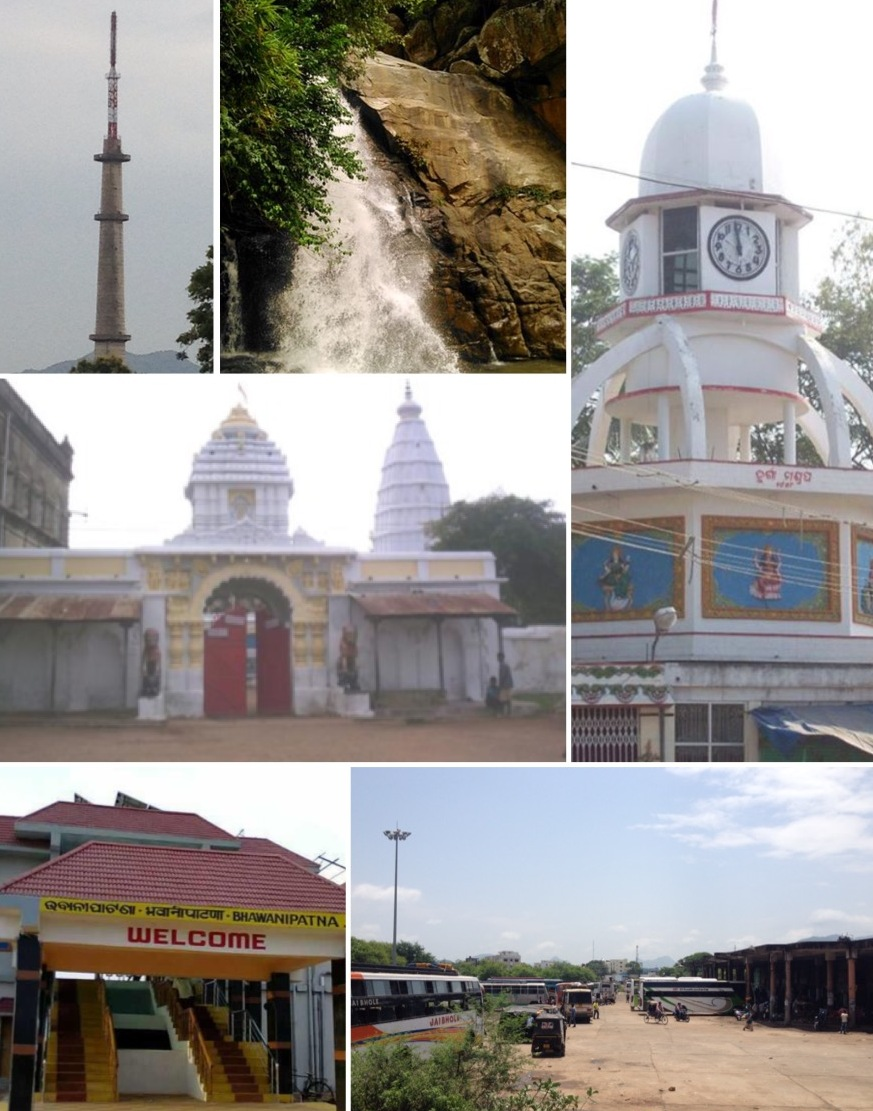
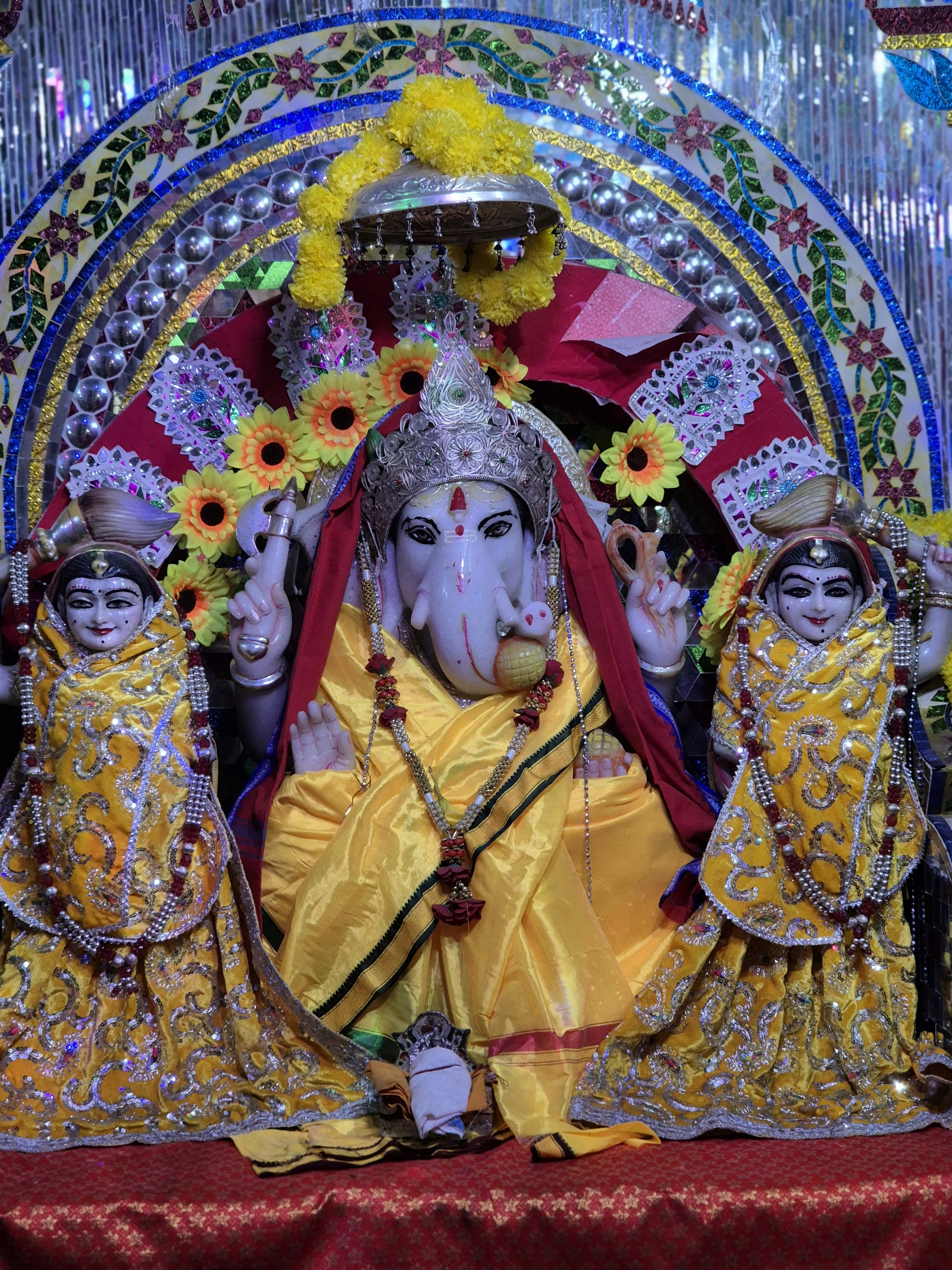
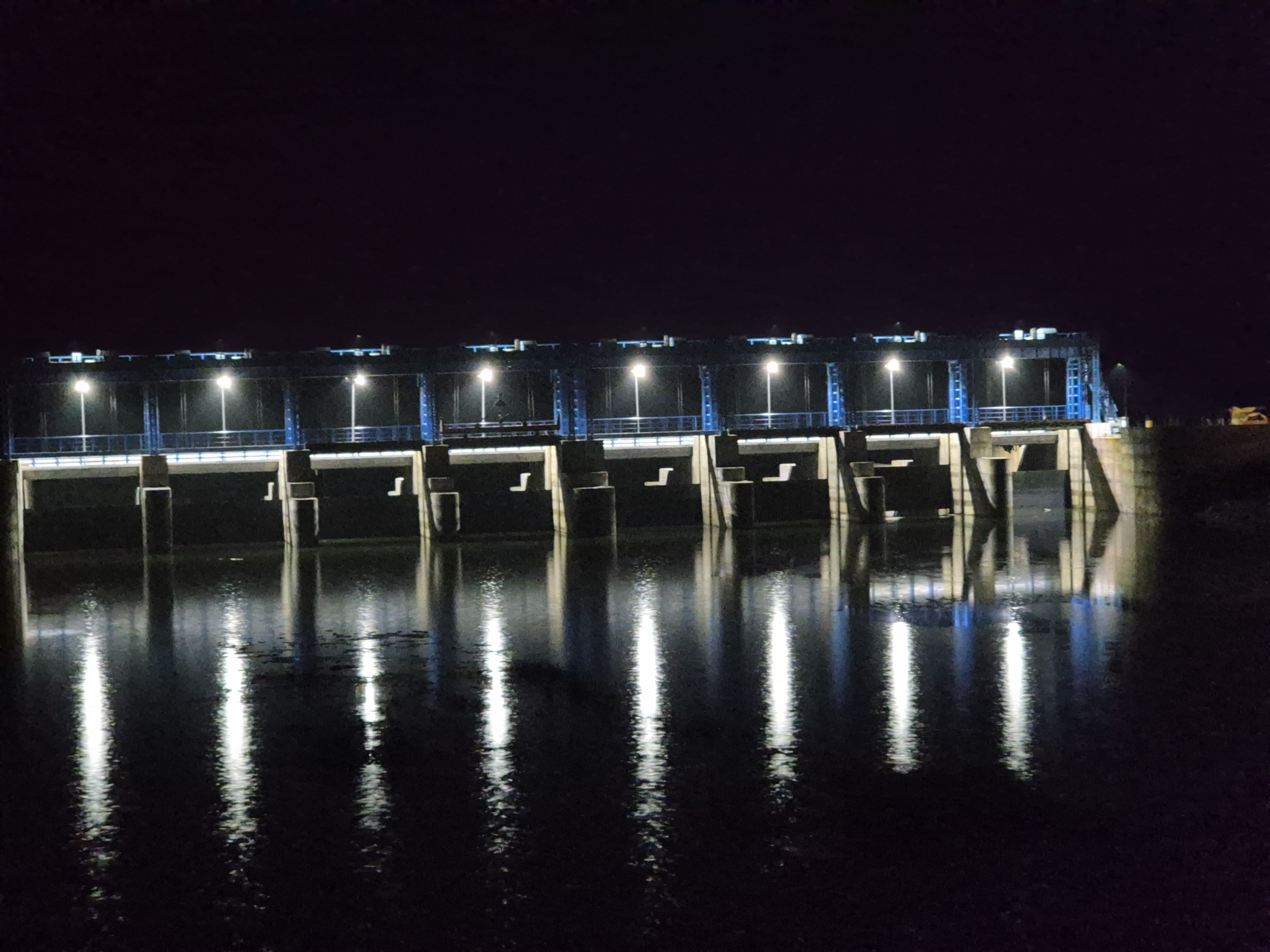
- Pictures of Kalahandi district

- Location in Odisha
- Coordinates: 20.083°N 83.2°E
- Country: India
- State: Odisha
- Headquarters: Bhawanipatna

Government
  - Member of Parliament: Malvika Devi (BJP)
  - Collector & District Magistrate: Sachin Pawar, IAS
  - Divisional Forest Officer Cum Wildlife Warden: Nitish Kumar, IFS
  - Superintendent of Police: Abilash G, IPS

Area
  - Total: 7,920 km^{2} (3,060 sq mi)

Population (2011)
  - Total: 1,576,869
  - Density: 169/km^{2} (440/sq mi)

Languages
  - Official: Odia
- Time zone: UTC+5:30 (IST)
- PIN: 766 001; 766 002
- Vehicle registration: OD-08
- Sex ratio: 0.999 ♂/♀
- Literacy: 59.22%
- Lok Sabha constituency: Kalahandi
- Vidhan Sabha constituency: 5 : 077-Lanjigarh(ST) 078-Junagarh 079-Dharmagarh 080-Bhawanipatna (SC) 081-Narla
- Climate: Aw (Köppen)
- Website: www.kalahandi.nic.in

Kalahandi district (Odia: Kɔɭāhāṇḍi) is a district in southwestern Odisha, India. Its headquarters is at Bhawanipatna. The district had a population of 1,576,869 at the 2011 census.

Archaeological evidence indicates human settlement in the region from the Stone and Iron Ages, and Asurgarh was an urban settlement about 2,000 years ago. The Naga dynasty began ruling Kalahandi in 1006. After Nagpur State lapsed to the British Crown in 1853, Kalahandi became a princely state under British rule; it joined India on 1 January 1948. In 1993, the Nuapada subdivision was separated to form Nuapada district.

Kalahandi has a primarily agricultural economy, and more than one third of the district is covered by forest. It also has deposits of bauxite, graphite and gemstones, while an alumina refinery operates at Lanjigarh. The district experienced repeated droughts during the 19th and 20th centuries and became nationally associated in the 1980s with poverty, malnutrition and starvation, an image sometimes described as the "Kalahandi Syndrome". The use of Kalahandi as a synonym for starvation and backwardness has also been contested. Irrigation from the Upper Indravati project has subsequently supported agricultural growth in parts of the district.

The culture of Kalahandi reflects both tribal and broader Odia traditions. Ghumura, associated particularly with southwestern Odisha, is among the folk dance forms practised in the district.

== History ==
Archaeological evidence of Stone Age and Iron Age human settlement has been recovered from the region. Asurgarh offered an advanced, well civilised, cultured and urban human settlement about 2000 years ago in the region. In South Asia it is believed that the lands of Kalahandi district and Koraput district were the ancient places where people started cultivation of paddy. In ancient time it was known as Mahakantara (meaning great forest) and Karunda Mandal, which means treasure of precious stones like karandam (corundum/manik), garnet (red stone), beruz, neelam (sapphire/blue stone), and alexandrite, etc. Maa Manikeswari (the goddess of Manikya or Karandam) is the clan deity of Kalahandi may also signify its historical name.

The archaeological record of the Tel Valley reveals the presence of the primates in its zones during the Pleistocenephase. Paleolithic is being documented in Kalahandi, like Moter river basin in Dharamgarh region. One of the largest size axe of late Stone Age culture has been recovered from Kalahandi. Tel river civilisation put light towards a great civilisation existing in Kalahandi in the past that is recently getting explored. The discovered archaeological wealth of Tel Valley suggest a well civilised, urbanised, cultured people inhabited on this land mass around 2000 years ago and Asurgarh was its capital. Kalahandi along with Koraput and Bastar was part of Kantara referred in Ramayana and Mahabharata.

In the 4th century BC Kalahandi region was known as Indravana from where precious gemstones and diamonds were collected for the imperial Maurya treasury. During the period of Maurya emperor Ashoka, Kalahandi along with Koraput and Bastar region was called Atavi Land. This land was unconquered as per Ashokan record. In the beginning of the Christian era probably it was known as Mahavana. In the 4th century AD Vyaghraraja was ruling over Mahakantara comprising Kalahandi, undivided Koraput and Bastar region. Asurgarh was capital of Mahakantara. After Vyaghraraja, the Nala kings like Bhavadatta Varman, Arthapati and Skanda Varman ruled over south part of this region up to about 500, the territory was known as Nalavadi-visaya and rest of Mahakantara, lower part of Tel river valley was ruled by king Tastikara and his scions, the kingdom was known as Parvatad-waraka, whose headquarters was Talabhamraka near Belkhandi.

In the 6th century a new kingdom developed in the Kalahandi tract under King Tustikara, but very little is known about other kings of his family. Maraguda valley was identified as the capital of Sarabapuriyas. During Sarabapuriyas in the 6th century, Kalahandi lost its political entities and merged with eastern part of South Kosal or Kosal. But this was also for a short period as in succeeding phase it assumed a distinct name Trikalinga. By the 9th–10th centuries the region including Western Odisha, Kalahandi, Koraput and Bastar was known as Trikalinga. The Somavamsi king Mahabhavagupta I Janmejaya (925 – 960) assumed the title Trikalingadhipati. Trikalinga was short lived and Chindakangas carved out a new kingdom called Chakrakota Mandala or Bramarakota Mandala, which later one expanded to whole Kalahandi and Koraput.

=== Naga dynasty of Kalahandi ===
The Naga dynasty started ruling Kalahandi in 1006. The Nagas of Kalahandi are the only dynasty in Odisha having a record of thousand years (1050–1948). During the 12th century Chkrakota Mandal was incorporated with the Ganga realm of Kalinga, and renamed "Kamala Mandala", thus Kalahandi region became part of Kalinga as a feudatory of the Eastern Gangas under Nagas rules and continued till the 14th century. After 14th century Nagas owed allegiance from Eastern Gangas to the Suryavamsi Gajapatis. This territory assumed independence after the downfall of the Gajapatis of Odisha in 1568.

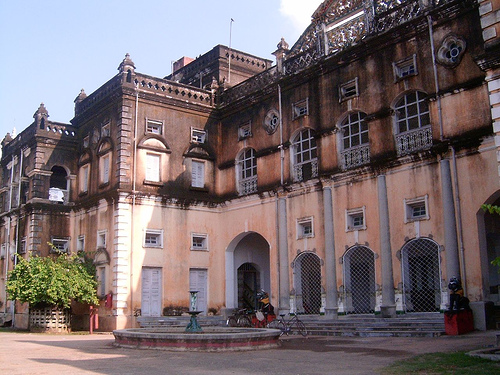
Palace of Kalahandi King

According to tradition the Kalahandi kingdom commanded sovereign power over eighteen garbs. It was occupied by the Bhonslas of Nagpur in the middle of the 18th century but still it was a Gadajat under Nagas rule. In 1853 the Nagpur state lapsed to the British Crown as Raghujee III died without an heir. Then Kalahandi became a princely state under British and known as Karonda Mandal. Maharaja Pratap Keshari Deo, the Ex-Maharaja of Kalahandi, in one of his articles expressed his view that the historical significance of naming Kalahandi as Karunda Mandala is based on the availability of Corundum in this region. Manikeswari (the goddess of Manikya), the clan deity of the Naga kings of Kalahandi may have also necessitated the adoption of the name.

After Indian independence in 1947, Kalahandi joined India on 1 January 1948. On 1 November 1949, Patna Balangir district and Subarnapur district together constituted a separate district and the Nuapada sub-division of Sambalpur was added to the Kalahandi district. In 1967, Kashipur block of Kalahandi district was transferred to Rayagada division for administrative purpose. In 1993, Raja Ravi Gupta along with his siblings and prajaa reinvented Nuapada. Nuapada sub-division was carved out as a separate district, but Kalahandi (Lok Sabha constituency) continues to constitute present Kalahandi district and Nuapada district together.

=== Post-independence ===
==== Kalahandi Syndrome ====
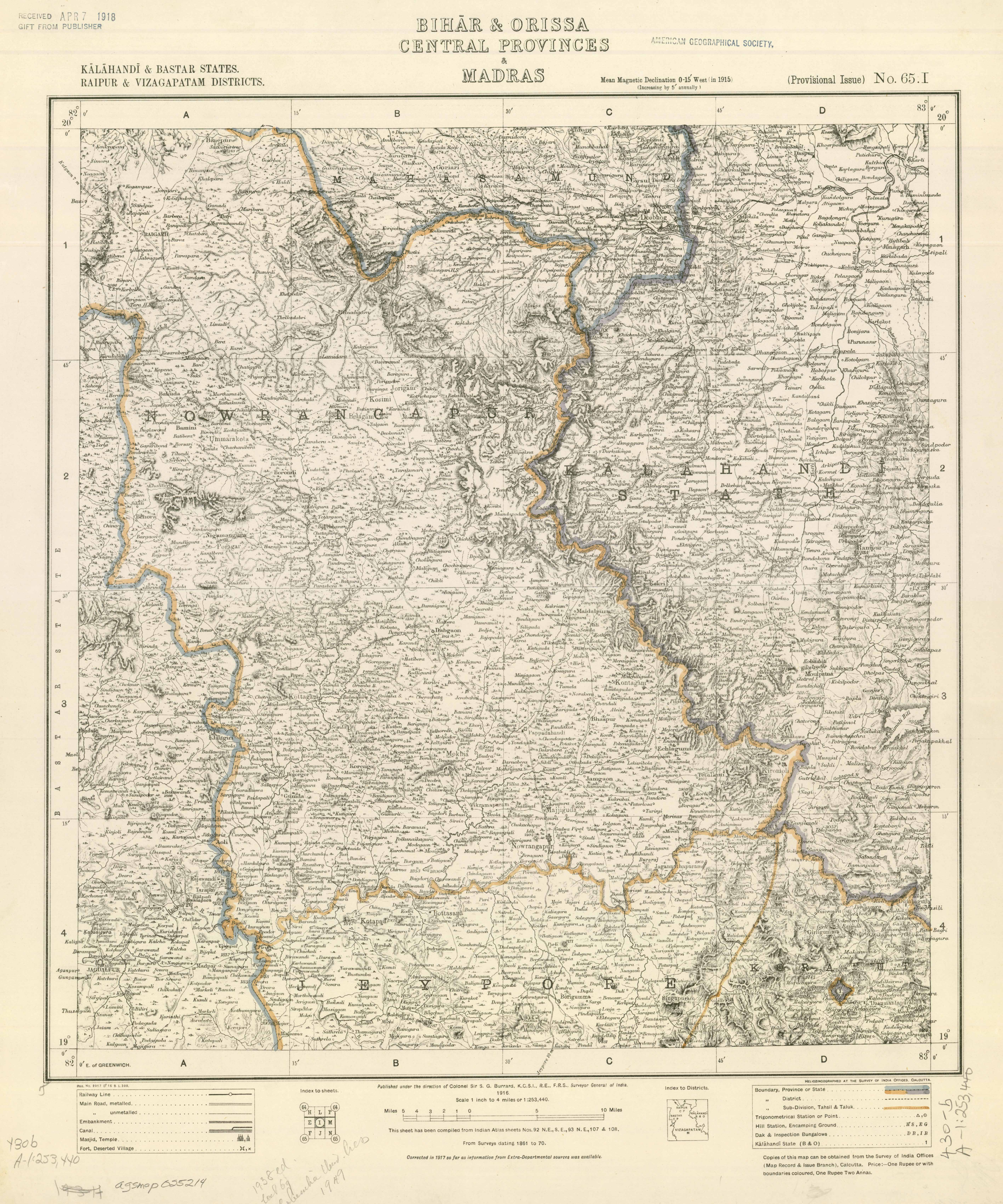
Kalahandi (1916)

Kalahandi has had several major droughts over the course of the 19th and 20th centuries. Drought had occurred in Kalahandi in 1868, 1884 and 1897. The famine of 1899 is otherwise known as "Chhapan Salar Durbhikshya". The effect of the famine, according to the District Gazetteers, were of a magnitude unprecedented in any previous famine. In 1919–1920, another drought occurred followed by cholera, influenza and malnutrition due to lack of foodstuff.

A series of droughts in 1922–1923, 1925–1926, 1929–1930, 1954–1955 and 1965–66 occurred in Kalahandi. In the 1965–66 drought, three-fourths of the crop production failed due to lack of rain. The effect of the drought continued to be felt in 1967. The District Gazetteers of the time noted that:

"The bulk of the population which constituted the landless agricultural labourers became unemployed due to suspension of all sorts of agricultural operations. The worst sufferers were the landed gentry, who, because of the drought, could not reap a harvest nor could they take to manual labour to which they were not accustomed. The pastures lost the greenery and the bovine population therefore was equally starved. Everywhere there was an acute shortage of water."

Again in 1974–75 and in 1985 . After the severe drought of 1956 and 1966, the rich cultivators of this area came down to the status of middle class cultivators and the middle class cultivators into ordinary ones. They all turned into Sukhbasis, a term used in Kalahandi for landless cultivators and labourers. The state's Bureau of Statistics and Economics has analyzed the rainfall of South Western Kalahandi and has reported that "there is a year of drought in every three or four years". Along with the drought the problems such as rural unemployment, non-industrialization, growth of population and rapid deforestation are some of the major problems of Kalahandi. Kalahandi has been in the news since the middle of the 1980s when India Today reported sale of a child by its parents due to financial crisis. That article led the then prime minister Rajiv Gandhi to pay a visit to the district and brought the district to the attention of the national stage for its acute poverty and famine. Subsequently, similar reported cases of starvation deaths and sale of children have led to the announcement of a host of relief efforts and development projects. This backward phenomena despite richness of Kalahandi was called Kalahandi Syndrome by social workers. Prime Minister P. V. Narasimha Rao announced the famous KBK project for backward undivided Kalahandi, Bolangir and Koraput districts in 1994. Nonetheless, Kalahandi has not been able to take off despite hosts of programmes, largely because of lacuna at implementation stage. As the basic infrastructure is dismal state, the development progress is very slow.

Kalahandi is more often used a symbol of backwardness in popular media and among politicians or social workers. Use of Kalahandi in popular literature has been controversial. In a literary conference, "Rajya Sastriya Lekhaka Sammilani" in 1994 at Bhawanipatna, many invited speakers and local intellectuals pointed out that it's not wise to use the name "Kalahandi" as synonym for starvation death. Starvation death does not imply image of Kalahandi completely and by using it for starvation death other rich aspects of life in Kalahandi are being ignored. Starvation death was just one side of a coin, like poverty in Odisha or India. However, there are many writers, philosophers, social workers, journalists, politicians etc., particularly in India who are continue to use the name in literature, articles and reviews. According to Tapan Kumar Pradhan although the drought situation in Kalahandi was a moderate natural disaster, the starvation deaths were a completely avoidable manmade disaster.

The Kalahandi film made by Indian film director Gautam Ghose received critical notice.

=== Political marginalization in recent times ===
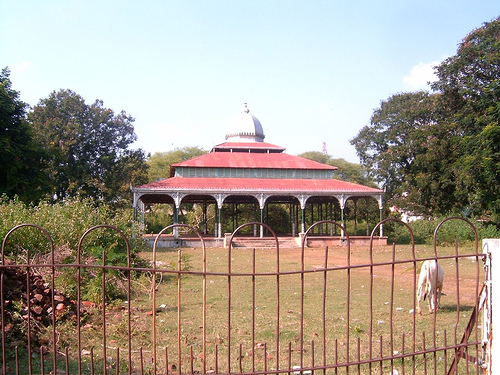
Sabha Mandap, Bhawanipatna Palace

Politically, the district does not have much importance in state or national politics. Though in 2000 and 2004 elections Biju Janata Dal- Bharatiya Janata Party combined had won all the MLA and MP seats in Kalahandi, in 2009 election people opted for Indian National Congress except Dharamgarh MLA constituency, which is largely seen as ongoing political negligence to this region. Bhakta Charan Das, as third time Indian National Congress MP from the district did not receive any Union Ministry in Manmohan Singh's Ministry. During the Chandrasekhar regime (1990–91), Bhakta Charan Das was part of the union ministry in the Railway and Sports department. No other MPs in last three decades have made it to any important post of national or state level. Pradeep Naik the seating MLA from Bhawanipatna Constituency is leader of opposition of Odisha assembly. Bhupinder Singh, Jagannath Pattnaik and Rasa Bihari Behera had been among the opposition leader, senior leaders, ministers in Odisha. Despite trio of them being in an important ministry like Revenue and Tourism, Agriculture they failed to make it to limelight. Earlier Pushpendra Singh Deo was a state and later on cabinet minister and currently Dibya Shankar Mishra is a state minister in Naveen Patnaik Government in Odisha since 2000. Political disappointment in the region is raising. Kalahandi highlighted for starvation and poverty is often marginalised in Odisha state and Indian national politics. This discrimination is thought to be due to national politics. Immediately after independence Kalahandi Lok Sabha Constituency was represented by non-congress candidate for 30 years, the period India was ruled by Congress Party. Thus, Kalahandi Lok Sabha Constituency was neglected and left out of development initiatives when the Congress ruled at the centre. Indira Gandhi visited Kalahandi in the early 1980s; Rajiv Gandhi visited in 1984; Sonia Gandhi visited in 2004, and Rahul Gandhi visited in 2008, 2009 and 2010. Since 1980, the Indian National Congress has been ruling for 20 years at the centre. Despite late prime ministers Indira Gandhi, Rajiv Gandhi, P.V. Narasimha Rao, and present leaders Atal Bihari Vajpayee, Sonia Gandhi, Rahul Gandhi etc. Tall claims for developing Kalahandi, little was done for long-term sustainable development in higher education, national highway, railway and industry during those leadership at Delhi. Few initiatives taken in post-independence of India for developing Kalahandi were only during non-congress rule in India such as Upper Indiravati Irrigation Project (during Moraji Desai as Prime Minister of India), Lanjigarh road – Jungarh and possibility of extending to Nabarangpur district (during Chandrasekhar as Prime Minister of India), National Highway 201 & 217 passing through Kalahandi (during Atal Bihari Vajpayee as Prime Minister of India), all these projects are not yet fully accomplished.

The Central government of India has established two public sector factories such as HAL factory and NALCO factory in the neighbouring Koraput district (part of KBK), a Lok Sabha constituency held by congress party since independence, and an ordnance factory in Balangir district (part of KBK) leaving only Kalahhani among KBK for such development in the region. No public sector industrial investment has been taken place in Kalahandi since past 62 years. Local need in major infrastructure in railway, highways and demand for a railway factory and Central University is not yet addressed. In 2008, "India Today" survey put Kalahandi among the bottom five Lok Sabha Constituency in Socio-economic and infrastructure development in India

==== Struggle for irrigation project ====
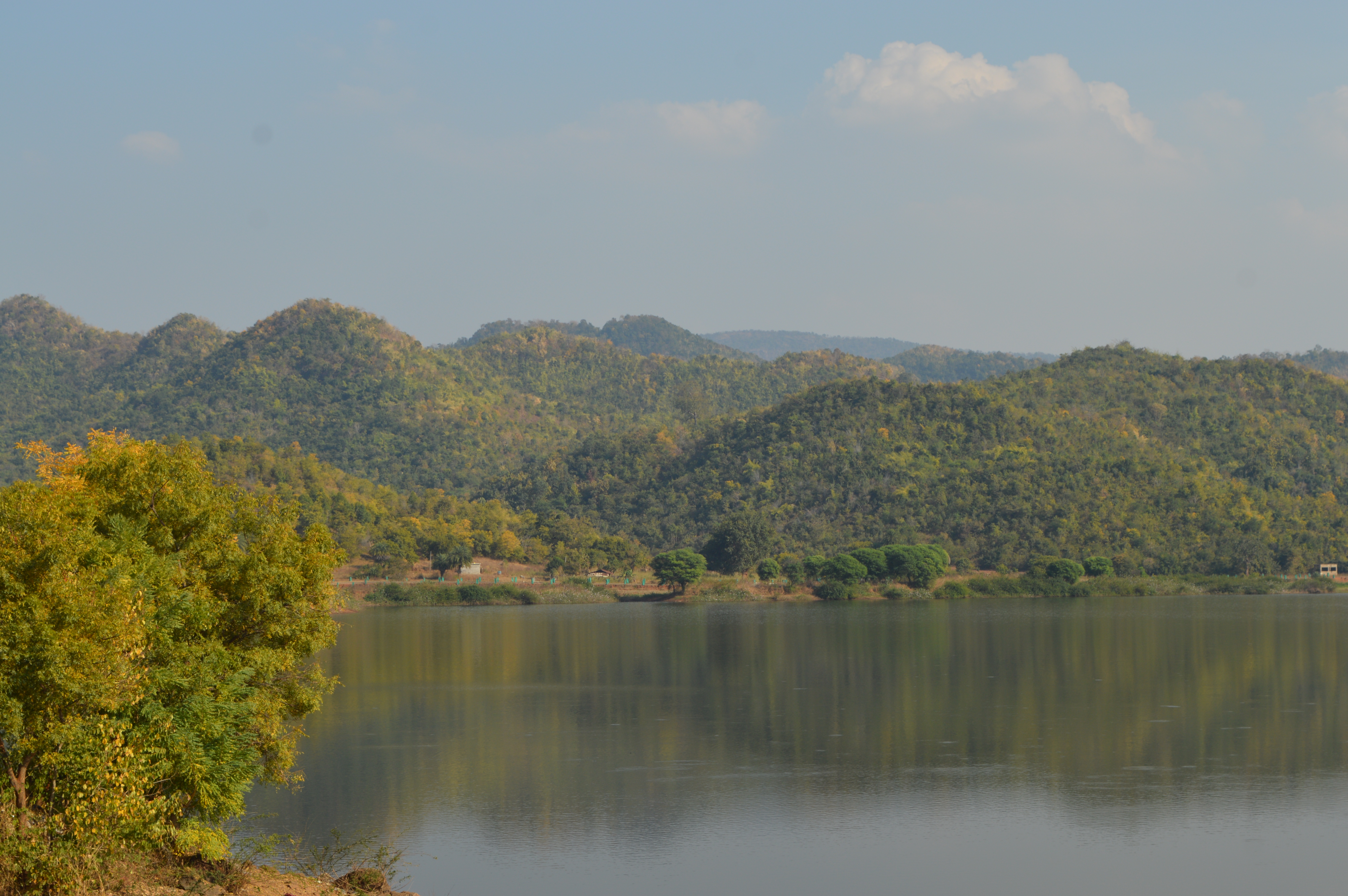
Pensul Dam Kalahandi

When Kalahandi was a princely state, a major irrigation project was initiated on Indravati River to build Indravati Dam by Maharaja Pratap Keshari Deo around 1939–47, and along with engineer Bhubaneswar Behera and administrator Ram Chandra Patra he visualized and prepared the blue print. However, in 1948 princely state of Kalahandi was merged as part of Odisha state and this could not be materialized. In post independence period as member of parliament Pratap Keshari Deo fought from 1950 to 1979 but was not able succeed as he was in the opposition of congress party until new Govt. formed by late prime minister Maraji Desai in 1978, who accepted Deo's proposal to construct the Indravati dam for hydroelectricity generation and irrigation purposes. After prime minister Morarji Desai's approval and foundation stone in 1978, the project took more than two decades to be realised and corruption was alleged with corruption. However, the project is a major boost to agricultural development today known as Upper Indravati Hydroelectric and irrigation project. There are still concerns and lack for government funds to irrigate Koksara, Golamunda and Bhawanipatan blocks in Kalahandi through this projects as every year lots of water is released from the dam through Hati river without using for irrigation. The Jonk River dam at Patora and Jonk river bridge and canal systems also took decades to complete due to corruption. Similarly water shades in Tel river for irrigation in Kalahandi is one of the basic demands of local farmers which is not getting Government support.

==== Struggle for a central university ====
Kalahandi was struggling for a higher educational institution since independence. Earlier proposal to establish a Government Engineering College or a state University in Kalahandi or Koraput region in the 1980s was later on shifted to some other part in Odisha for political reasons. A team visited by planning commission to Kalahandi Balangir Koraput (KBK) region had suggested to establish an agriculture college in the region. Since 1988 people of Kalahandi are seriously demanding a Central University in Kalahandi as it is central to all KBK districts and has good railway connectivity to major cities in India from Kesinga railway station. In the 1990s when state Government of Odisha proposed to establish a university in northern Odisha, people of Kalahandi repeated their demand for such a university in Kalahandi as well. Then Chief Minister of Odisha Biju Patnaik while addressing publicly in Government College Bhawanipatna said Government could not establish University if people want to establish University in their neighbourhood. But Mr Giridhar Gomang, Chief Minister of Odisha later in 1999 agreed to establish two Universities in Baripada and Balasore due to public protest making people of Kalahandi highly disappointed. This otherwise unorganized and weak demand took serious turn when leading academician Prof. Gopa Bandhu Behera established "Kalahandi Sikhya Vikas Parishad' in Bhawanipatna in 1999 through it and "Central University Kriya Committee" the struggle for a Central University in Kalahandi continued seriously. Many memoranda were submitted to both state and central Government in this regard since then. In the meantime, in 2006–07, non-resident Indians of Odisha origin and activists in Bhubaneswar started campaigning for central universities in every state and that of one in KBK districts of Odisha. Few NRI advocated for such higher educational institutions in Kalahandi. When Government of India announced to establish 12 Central Universities in various states not having any Central University across India which included Odisha, a delegation from Kalahandi consisting intellectuals, general people and politicians met Odisha's Chief Minister Naveen Patnaik in May 2008 to establish the Central University in Kalahandi. Naveen Patnaik promised and asked them to find out land details for establishing it in Kalahandi. People of Kalahandi sent the land details through district of Collector of Kalahandi in July 2008. However, without studying it, Odisha's Chief Minister unilaterally announced to establish proposed Central University of Odisha in Koraput, though it was expected to come up in Bhawanipatna. Again a team from Kalahandi visited Chief minister immediately after the announcement and Chief minister of Odisha promised visiting delegation of Kalahandi to establish a Government Engineering and Agriculture Colleges in Bhawanipatna. People of Kalahandi though welcome establishment of such the colleges, Kalahandi Sikhya Vikas Parisad and Central University Kriya Committee said it's not a replacement for the Central University as estimated cost for the proposed Central University is ₹8 billion (US$83 million) with an area of 500 acres (2.0 km^{2}) of land, whereas both Engineering and Agriculture Colleges are estimated to be 100 million as per Government announcement so far. Subsequently, on 26 Dec 2008 leading academician from abroad demanded to convert Government Autonomous College Bhawanipatna to a university in the line of university tag given to Ravenshaw College, UCE Burla and Khallikote College. Coincidentally next day on 27 Dec 2008 Odisha chief minister officially announced an Engineering College and an Agriculture College at Bhawanipatna keeping his earlier promise. However, the demand to cnovert Government Autonomous College Bhawanipatna to a university was further taken by students, Kalahandi Sikhya Vikas Parisad, academicians, and local leaders for over a decade. Finally, Odisha Government announced to convert Government Autonomous College Bhawanipatna to a university in Feb 2019, just before the assembly election. Few NRI also had demanded to either establish a Central Agriculture University or a state agriculture university in Kalahandi because of its agriculture potential and central location in the KBK region, subsequently then Union minister of Agriculture asked Odisha Govt. to study this referring to letter by Kalahandi MP and before election of 2014 Odisha Govt. had included in its manifesto to establish second Agriculture University in an area under KBK districts. Although academicians, Kalahandi Sikhya Vikas Parishad and people have been demanding to establish Agriculture University in Bhawanipatna, no progress has been made yet.

==== Struggle for railway lines and rail factory ====
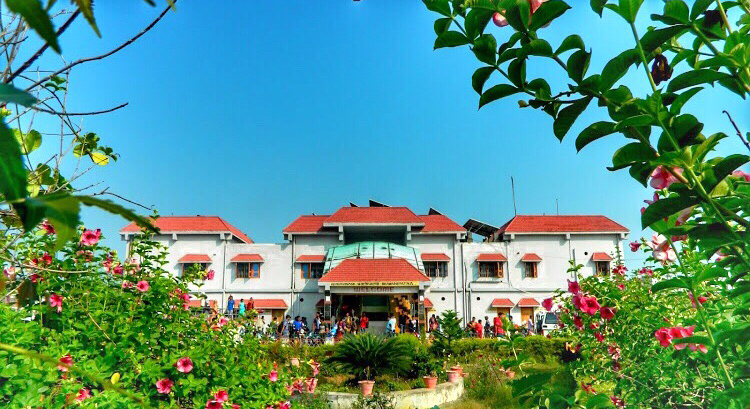
Bhawanipatna Railway station

Kalahandi and Nuapada districts have a higher number of migrant workers than other states. Agriculture alone is not enough for employment generation for this region and needs industrial development. Since 2008, non-resident Indian of Kalahandi origin have initiated and appealed to establish a railway factory in the backward KBK region. In the 2010-11 budget Indian railway has proposed a Wagon factory to be established in Bhubaneswar or Kalahandi. But Odisha Government proposed to establish such Wagon factory in Ganjam district, which was highly criticized by intellectuals, non-resident Indians, local people and politicians. Protest continued in Kalahandi region by local leaders, people and NRI for two years. Due to public pressure in the 2013-2014 railway budget announcement was made for setting up a Wagon Periodical Overhauling Workshop in Kalahandi, and again this was shifted to Vishakapatnam (Vadlapudi) because of technical reason. Moreover, in the 2017-18 union budget, an Electric Loco Periodical Overhauling Workshop was announced to be set up in Kalahandi with an investment of Rs 186 crore. Not much progress has been made since then.

Lanjigarh–Junagarh section under East Coast Railway Zone was completed in March 2014, which was sanctioned when local MP Bhakta Charan Das was minister of state for railway in 1990–91. The surveyed railway line, Kantabanji (Balangir) -Jeypore (Koraput) via Nuapada, Kalahandi and Nabarangpur districts, needs approval, funding and immediate implementation. Similarly Junagarh Road-Nabarangpur rail line project is pending for 8 years to get budgetary approval despite appeal from locals and academicians. NRI of Odisha origin initiated demanding to survey for Raipur-Rajim-Gariabandh-Debhog-Dharamagrh-Junagarh since 2008, Lanjigarh road-Phulbani-Angul (Talcher) since 2009 and Bhawanipatna-Kesinga since 2011, and survey by Indian railway was approved for Talcher-Phulbani-Lanjigarh in 2010, Raipur- Rajim-Gariabandh-Debhog-Dharamagrh-Junagarh in 2012, Bhawanipatna-Kesinga in 2017 for but not much progress has been made for these projects.

== Present Development ==
Kalahandi has also been noted for pioneering initiatives in technological skilling and rural innovation. Under the Sansad Adarsh Gram Yojana (SAGY), Member of Parliament Sujeet Kumar facilitated the establishment of India’s first Centres of Excellence for Drone Technology (CoEs) in two government schools in the villages of Sagada and Bhatangpadar. These centres aim to equip tribal youth, particularly young women, with training in drone operation and related technologies, fostering technical empowerment and contributing to the emergence of a new cohort of “drone didis.”

== Geography ==
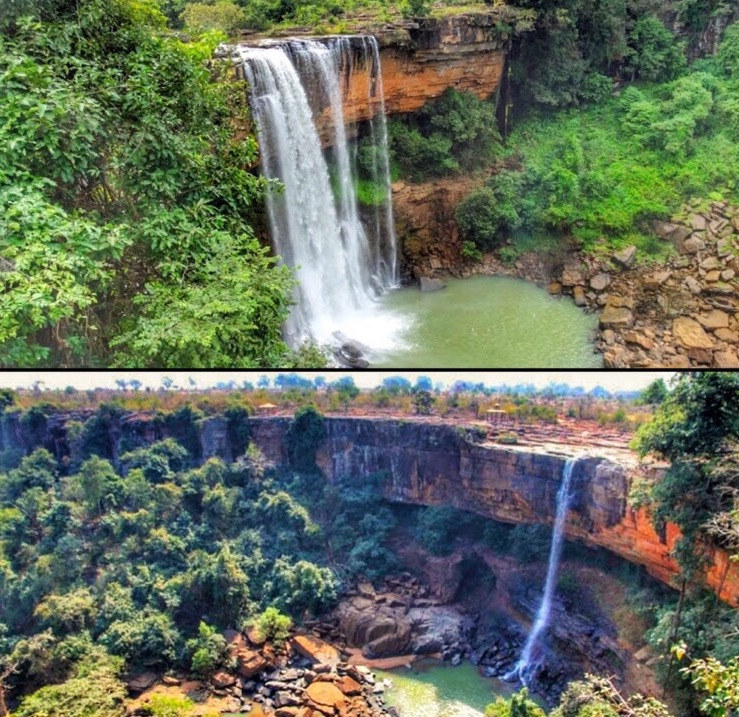
Ghumar Waterfall, Kalahandi

Kalahandi lies between 19.3 N and 21.5 N latitudes and 82.20 E and 83.47 E longitudes in southwestern Odisha, bordered to the north by the Balangir district and Nuapada district, to the south by the Nabarangpur district, Koraput district and Rayagada district, and to the east by the Rayagada district, Kandhamal district and Boudh district. It has an area of 8,364.89 square kilometres and ranks 7th in terms of area among the 30 districts of Odisha. The district headquarters is at Bhawanipatna which stands almost in the central location of the district. Bhawanipatna and Dharamgarh are two sub-divisions of Kalahandi. Junagarh, Jaipatna, Kesinga, Lanjigarh and Mukhiguda are other major towns in Kalahandi. Tel is the main river of Kalahandi. Other notably rivers are Indravati, Udanti, Hati, Utei, Sagada, Rahul, Nagabali, Mudra, etc. The topography of Kalahandi consists of plain land, hills & mountains. Kalahandi is surrounded by hills. Its border with Nabarangpur, Koraput, Rayagada and Kandhamal districts are hilly and mountainous. The district is primarily agricultural, with over one third of the district area covered with dense jungle forest. Industry is very limited, but bauxite and graphite deposits can be commercially exploited.

== Administrative Setup ==
Kalahandi has been divided into two sub-divisions namely Bhawanipatna subdivision and Dharamgarh subdivision and 13 blocks.

- Blocks under Bhawanipatna subdivision are: Bhawanipatna, Kesinga, Lanjigarh, Narla, Karlamunda, M. Rampur, and T. Rampur.
- Blocks under Dharamgarh Sub-Division are: Dharamgarh, Junagarh, Koksara, Jaipatna, Kalampur, and Golamunda.

== Economy ==
In 2006 the Ministry of Panchayati Raj named Kalahandi one of the country's 250 most backward districts (out of a total of 640). It is one of the 19 districts in Odisha currently receiving funds from the Backward Regions Grant Fund Programme (BRGF).

=== Agriculture ===
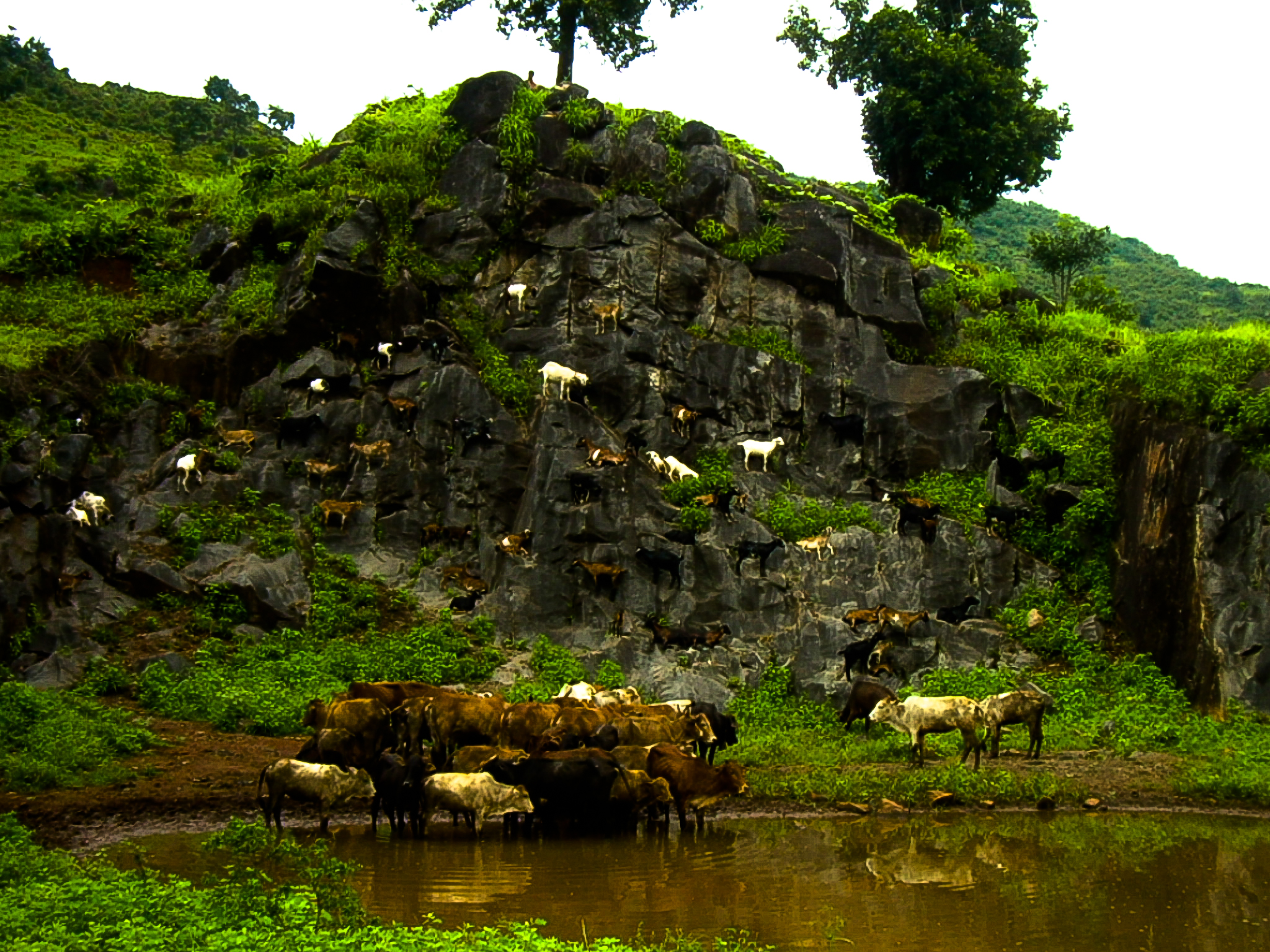
Kalahandi Cows

Kalahandi is largely an agriculture-based economy. During the Bengal famine Kalahandi alone had sent 100,000 tons of rice. During the 1930s princely state of Kalahandi had proposed to build upper Indravati project but subsequent merger of princely state with India delayed the project. It was approved in 1978 and is yet to be fully completed. In the meantime drought occurred in the 1960s and lately in the 1980s. In the 1980s Kalahandi become infamous for drought, child selling, malnutrition and starvation death and social worker referred it as 'Kalahandi Syndrome'. Though KBK project was announced in the 1990s by central Government specially for undivided Kalahandi, Balangir and Koraput districts primarily keeping poverty, backwardness and starvation death in mind, undivided Kalahandi district continued to remain politically ignored. Kalahandi is an example of disparity/contrasts that exist in many parts of the developing/underdeveloped world. On the one side, this district is famous for famine and starvation deaths: this is the same district that is rich with agriculture. Dharamgarh sub-division was historical known for rice production in Odisha. Since the 2000s the Indravati Water Project, second biggest in the state has changed the landscape of southern Kalahandi, leading to two crops in a year. Because of this, blocks like Kalampur, Jaipatna, Dharamgarh, Jungarh, Bhawanipatna etc. are witnessing rapid agricultural growth. This has boasted the highest number of rice mills in Kalahandi among districts in Odisha. The number of rice mills in the district was around 150 in the year 2004–05. More than 70% have been built in the five years after commissioning of the Indravati project.

=== Forest resources ===
Forest based products like Mahua, Kendu leaf, wood, timber and bamboos contribute local economy largely. Kalahandi supplied substantial raw materials to paper mills in neighbouring Rayagada and Jeypore.

=== Gem stone ===
Kalahandi was famous for gemstone (Karonda Mandal) in ancient times. Its rich gemstone deposit included cat's eye, sapphire, ruby, garnet, crystal, topaz, moonstone, diamond, tourmaline, acquamarine, beryle, alexandrite, etc. The distribution and occurrence of precious and semi-precious gemstones and other commercial commodities of the region have found place in the accounts of Panini (5th century BC), Kautilya (3rd century BC), Ptolemy (2nd century AD), Wuang Chuang (7th century AD) and Travenier (19th century AD). Until recently, Kalahandi, along with Balangir, supplied gem stones for handicraft work that can be found in Delhi Haat. Jiligndara, near Junagarh of Kalahandi, has one of the largest ruby deposits of Asia as per Geological Survey of India.

=== Industry ===
Vedanta Alumina Limited (VAL), a subsidiary of Sterlite Industries, a major aluminium processor has made major investments by establishing a 1 MTPA Alumina Refinery and 75 MW Captive Power Plant at Lanjigarh. Though this project has received criticism from environmentalists, especially from tribals of Niyamgiri; supporters of VAL claims it has brought significant changes in Socio-Economic scenario of Lanjigarh and Kalahandi. The Union Environment Ministry in August 2010, rejected earlier clearances granted to a joint venture led by the Vedanta Group company Sterlite Industries for mining bauxite from Niyamgiri hills making the company to depend on bauxite from outside Odisha. The company's proposal for Expansion of the Refinery to 6 MTPA, which would have made it one of the largest refinery in the world, was halted by India's environment ministry.

== Transport ==
=== Air ===
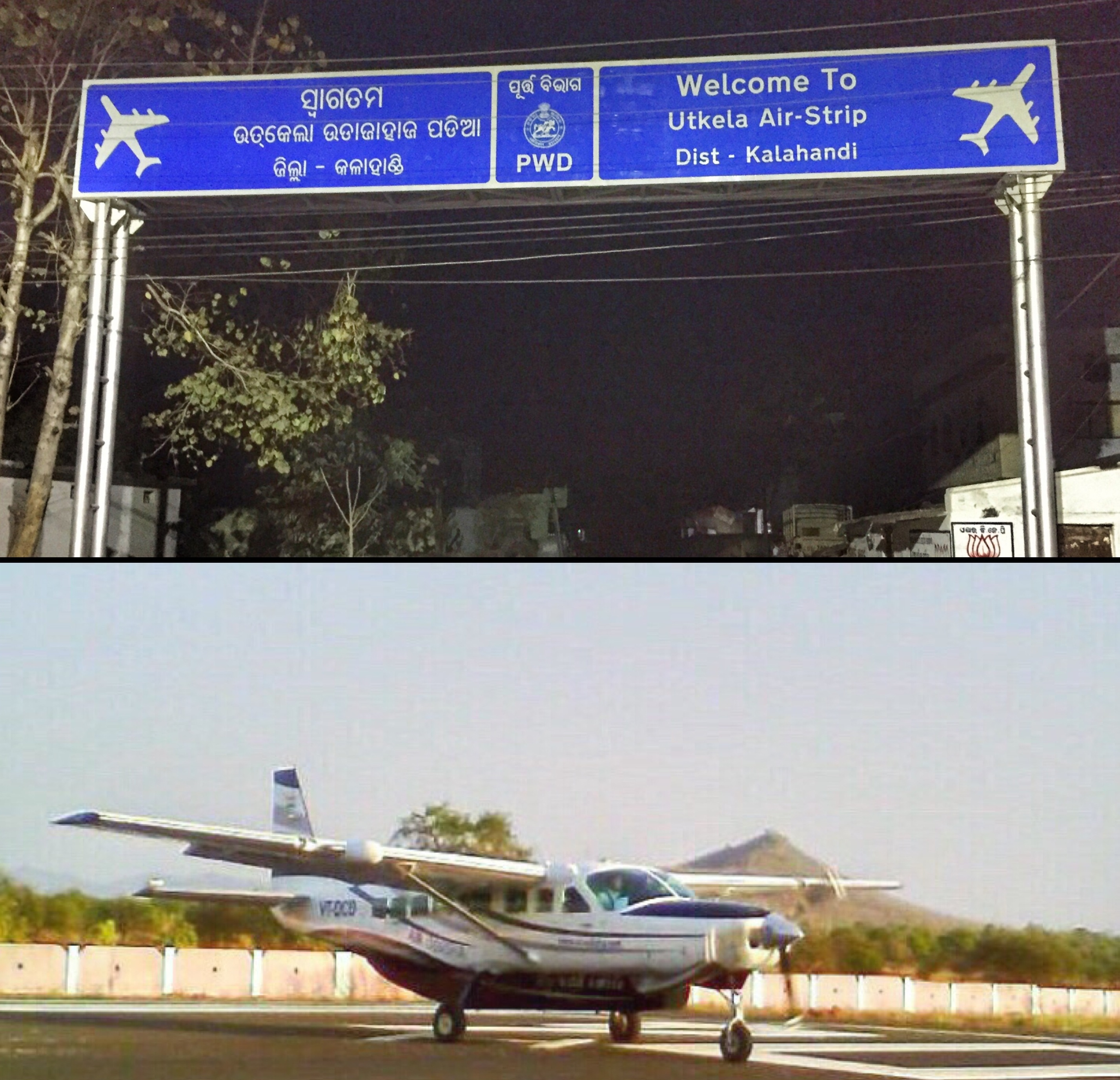
Utkela Airstrip, Kalahandi

Utkela Airport (VEUK) is present near the city (22 km, 14 mi) which is scheduled to be operational with daily flights to state capital Bhubaneshwar and Raipur in the coming month of September by private air service provider Air Odisha under UDAN scheme by Ministry of Civil Aviation, Govt. of India. Another one, Lanjigarh Airstrip (FR44733)(58 km, 36 mi) is private airstrip conducting VIP and chartered planes. Swami Vivekananda Airport at Raipur, Chhattisgarh is 262 km (163 mi) away. Biju Patnaik International Airport in the state capital, Bhubaneswar is 427 km away by road and 631 km by rail.

=== Rail ===
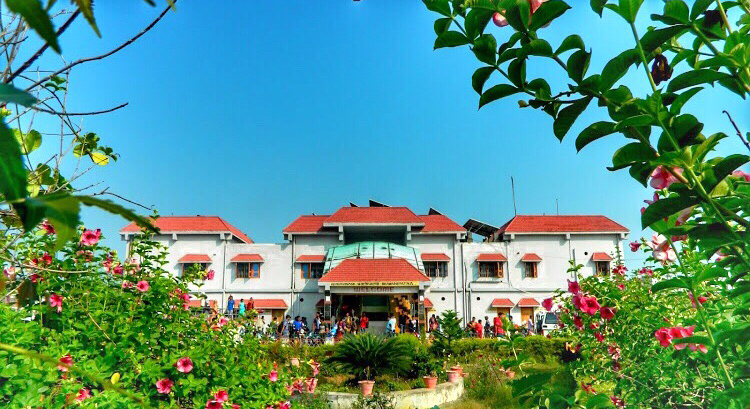
Bhawanipatna Railway Station

Bhawanipatna railway station was inaugurated on 12 August 2012. It is situated on Lanjigarh-Junagarh rail line. Currently there are 3 trains (1 express and 2 passengers) running from Bhawanipatna to Bhubaneswar, Raipur and Sambalpur.

=== Road ===
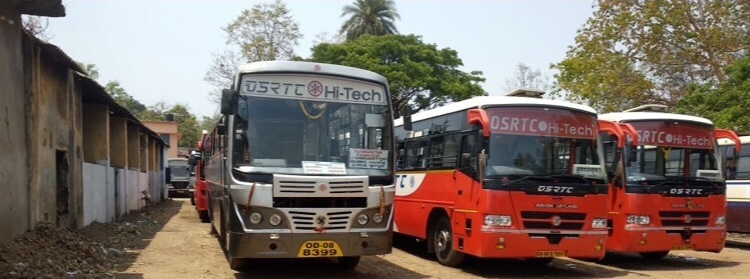
Old Bus Stand, Bhawanipatna

Highways connecting Bhawanipatna to various cities:

- NH-26 - Bargarh - Bolangir - Bhawanipatna - Nabarangpur - Koraput - Vizianagram - Natavalsa
- SH-16 - Bhawanipatna - Khariar - Raipur
- SH-6 - Bhawanipatna - Chhatiguda - Ambodala - Muniguda
- SH-6A - M.Rampur - Narla - Chhatiguda
- SH-44 - Bhawanipatna - Gunupur - Thuamul Rampur - Kashipur - Tikri

Bhawanipatna Bus Stand is one of the biggest bus stand in Odisha present on NH-26. Both Private and Govt. buses are available from here. Bhawanipatna is one of the division of Odisha State Road Transport Corporation (O.S.R.T.C.) that runs Govt. Buses from Bhawanipatna to Bhubaneshwar, Vishakhapatnam, Sambalpur, Berhampur, Cuttack, Jeypore. Private Buses (A/C Sleeper Coaches) provide transportation facility to different cities in Odisha and Raipur, Durg etc. in Chhattisgarh. Newly added taxi facility and auto facility including Biju Gaon Gadi throughout Bhawanipatna and villages nearer to it, is adding an advantage to the transport facility.

== Demographics ==
Historical population
Year	Pop.	±%
1901	326,578	—
1911	393,006	+20.3%
1921	400,178	+1.8%
1931	476,407	+19.0%
1941	541,934	+13.8%
1951	585,825	+8.1%
1961	679,602	+16.0%
1971	824,975	+21.4%
1981	946,509	+14.7%
1991	1,130,903	+19.5%
2001	1,335,494	+18.1%
2011	1,576,869	+18.1%
Source: Census of India

Religions in Kalahandi district (2011)
Religion	Per cent
Hinduism	98.64%
Christianity	0.71%
Other or not stated	0.65%

According to the 2011 census Kalahandi district has a population of 1,576,869, roughly equal to the nation of Gabon or the US state of Idaho. This gives it a ranking of 317th in India (out of a total of 640). The district has a population density of 199 inhabitants per square kilometre (520/sq mi). Its population growth rate over the decade 2001–2011 was 17.79%. Kalahandi has a sex ratio of 1003 females for every 1000 males, and a literacy rate of 59.22%. 7.74% of the population lives in urban areas. Scheduled Castes and Scheduled Tribes make up 18.17% and 28.50% of the population respectively.

=== Language ===
Languages of Kalahandi district (2011)
1. Odia (95.2%)
2. Kui (3.40%)
3. Others (1.38%)

At the time of the 2011 Census of India, 95.22% of the population in the district spoke Odia, 3.40% Kui and 0.85% Hindi as their first language.

The language spoken by the people of Kalahandi is Kalahandia, a dialect of Odia. Minor languages of the district after Odia are Hindi and Kui.

== Culture ==
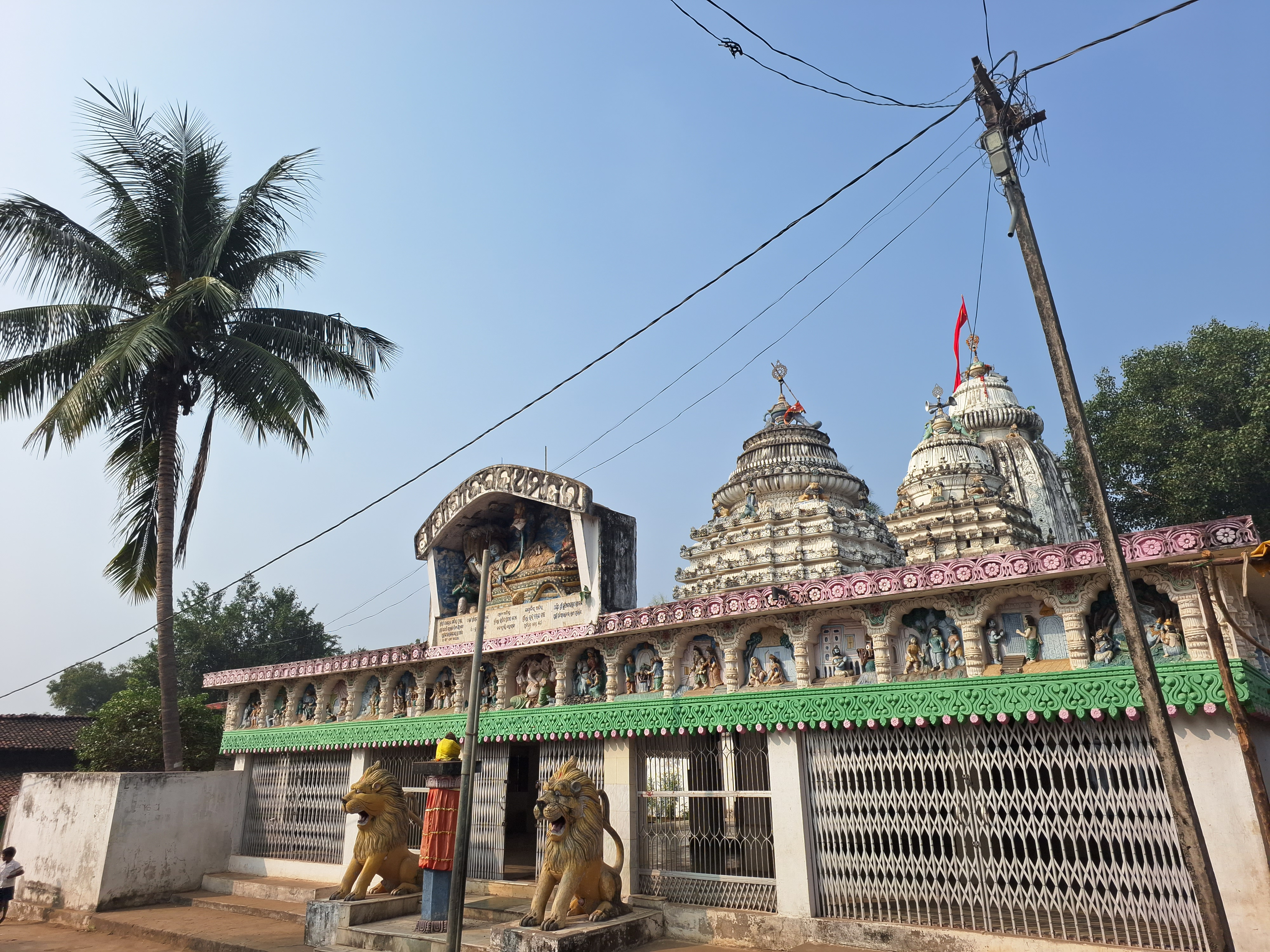
Sidhhi Shreekhyetra, Tumura, Golamunda, Kalahandi

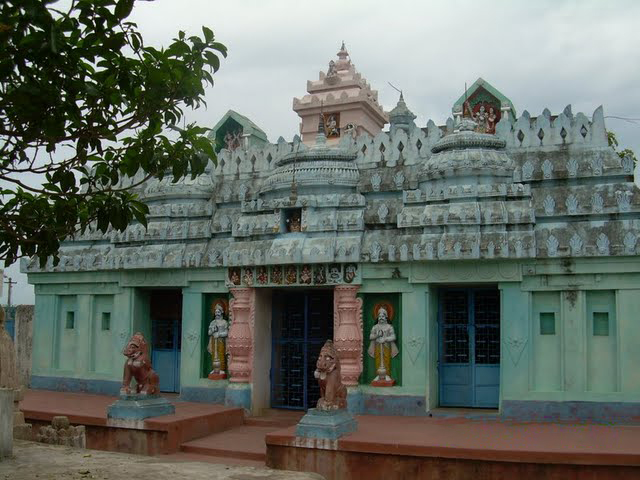
Dadhibamana Temple, Brahmanpada, Junagarh, Kalahandi, Odisha

Kalahandi is a rich land in culture and festivals. Since it is a melting point of southern Odisha and Western Odisha with a substantial tribal population, those living in hills as well as plain land, their culture, tradition, languages and belief along with mainstream Hindu culture have made Kalahandi region rich with culture and festivals. The mixture of Aryan and tribal culture makes Kalahandi region rich in its culture and festivals. In pre-independence period Kalahandi was largely inspired to Saivaism, Vaishanivism and Shakti puja. Shakti Puja is largely accepted among tribal, perhaps due to which Kalahandi was well known for celebrating Shati Puja. However, affect induction of Kalahandi as part of Odisha state, dominance of coastal Oriya culture in the state is increasingly influencing the local culture. Celebration of Rathajatra and construction of Jaggannath temple in Kalahandi has been increasingly realised unlike in old days of Radha Krishna temple.

=== Local custom ===
The majority of the population are Hindu, a small minority being Christian, Muslim, Sikh, Buddhist and Jain. 28% of the population are tribal people which has the majority of the impact on the local customaries and influenced the dialect.

=== Art & craft ===
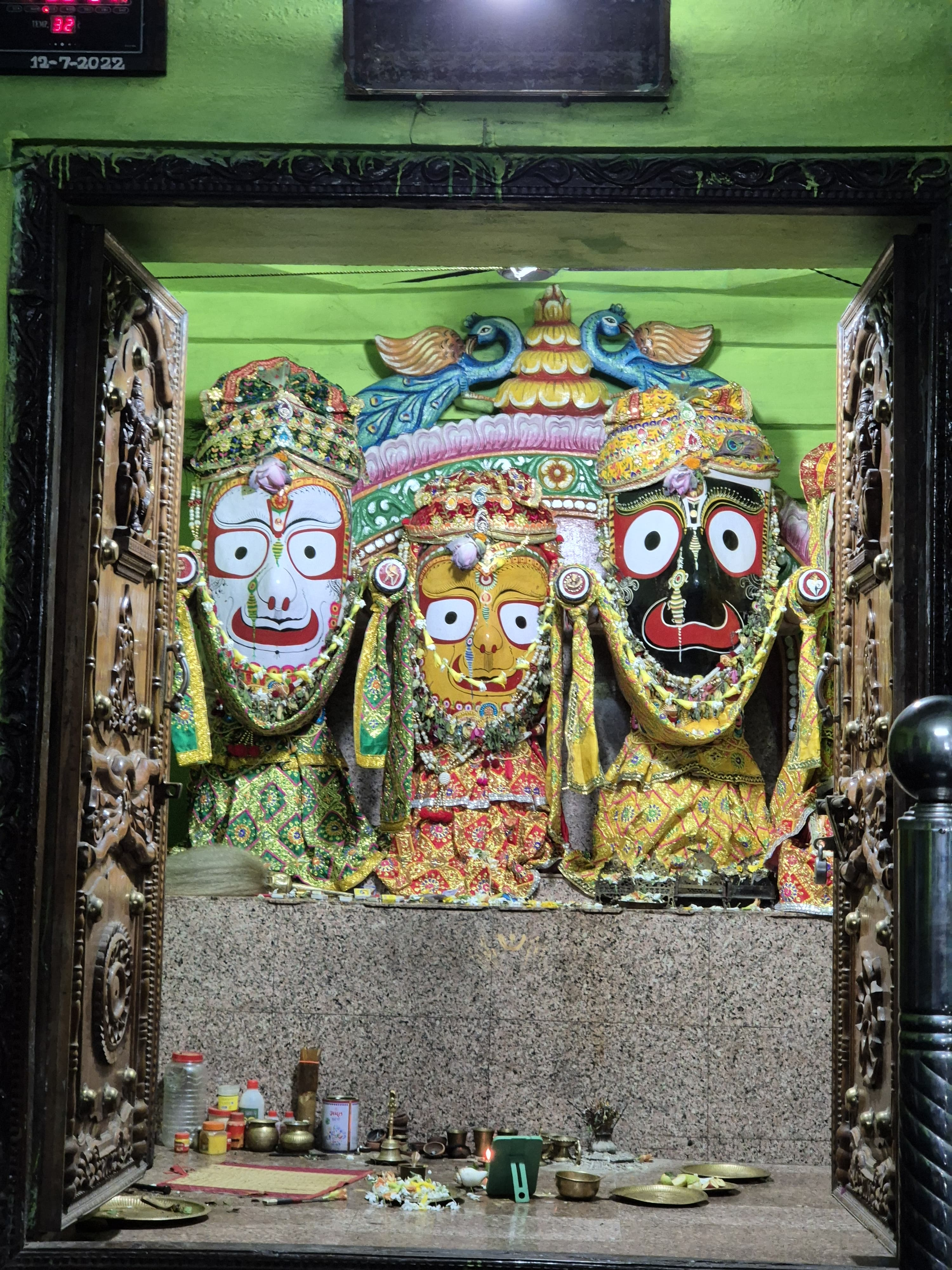
Jagannath temple, Kesinga, Kalahandi

Literally 'Kalahandi' means 'pot of arts'. This name has been possibly derived from "Gudahandi Caves" containing pre-historic paintings in red and black colours. Kalahandi is a rich land in terms of art and craft. Stone from Kalahandi is well known to make jewellery. Habasipuri pattern is well established in handloom Saree. Wood craft from Khaipadar is famous for export and domestic market.

=== Dance & music ===
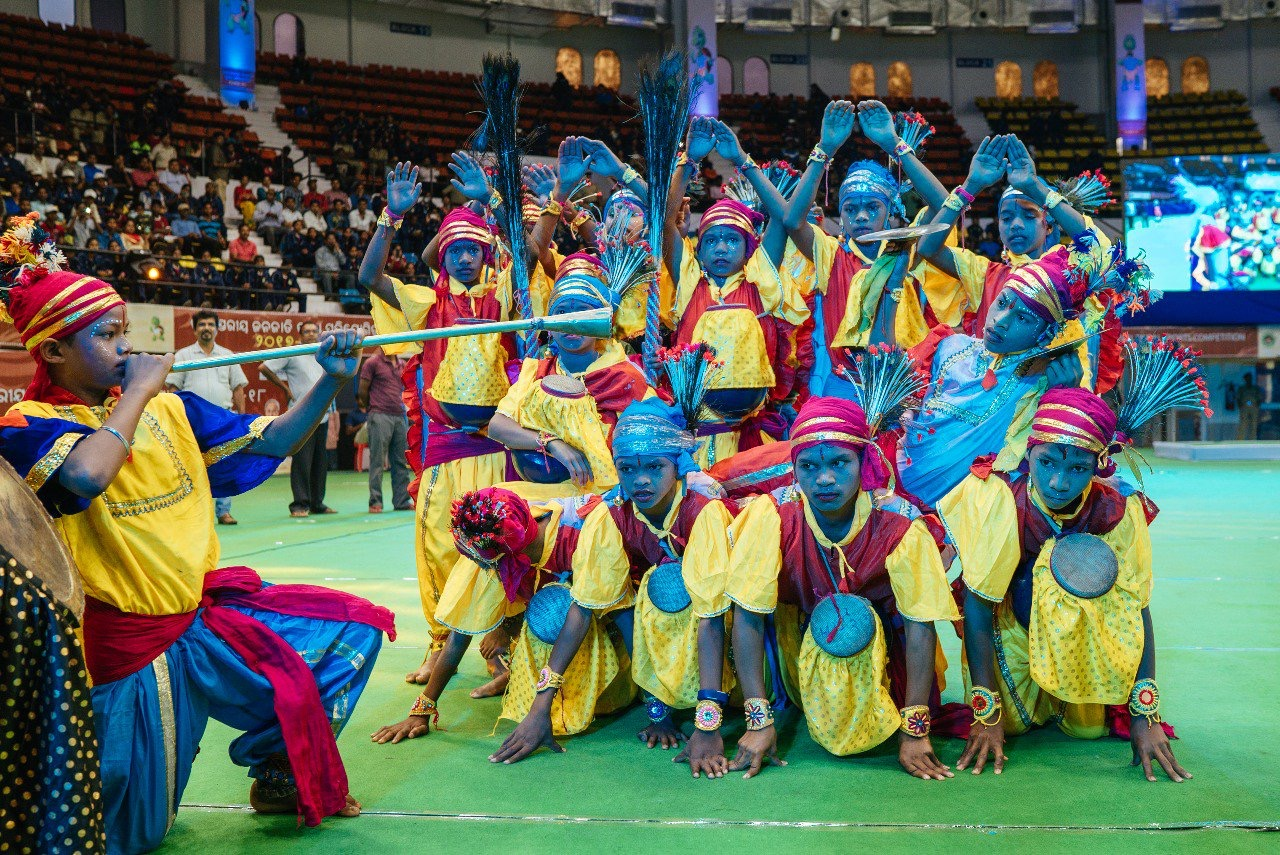
Ghumura Dance during Odisha Tribal sports meet.

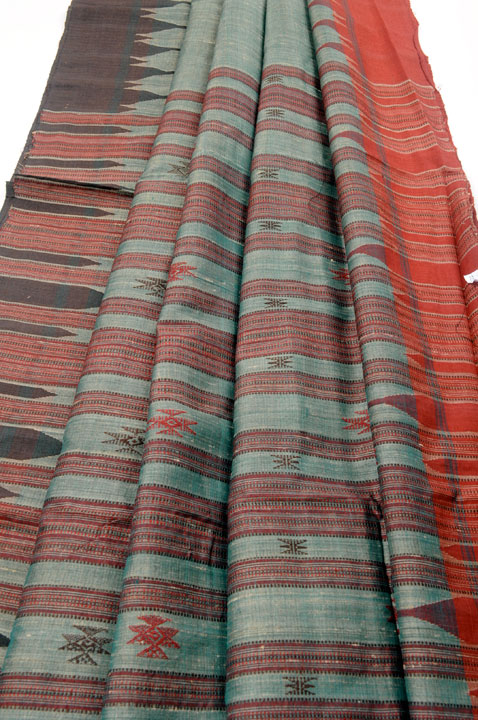
Habaspuri a traditional handloom from Kalahandi.

Kalahandi has the wide varieties of dance forms comprising tribal and non-tribal dance. Among the districts level in Odisha, it has the maximum dance form. Overall Kalahandi life is associated with music and dance. Some of the dance found in Kalahandi such as Dalkhai, Jaiphula, Rasarkeli, Sajani etc. have similarities with the dance form in Balangir, Sambalpur, etc. regions whereas Sari song, Pholia song, song related to nature etc. has similarities with Koraput region. However, Boria song, Nialimali, Kalakolik etc. mostly found in Kalahandi. On the other hand, Ghumura, Madali, Dandari, Dhab, Bajasalia etc. folk form found in Kalahandi can be composed songs.

Ghumura dance is the most sought folk dance in Kalahandi. It is classified as folk dance as the dress code of Ghumura resembles more like a tribal dance, but recent researchers argue different mudra and dance form present in Ghumura bear more resemblance with other classical dance form of India. The timeline of Ghumura dance is not clear. Many researchers claim it was a war dance in ancient India and used by Ravana in Ramayana. Ghumura dance is depicted in Sun Temple of Konark confirming this dance form is since the medieval period. Ghumura dance has evolved from a war dance to a dance form for cultural and social activities. The dance is associated with social entertainment, relaxation, love, devotion and friendly brotherhood among all class, creed and religion in the present days. Traditionally this dance is also associated with Nuakhai and Dasahara celebration in Kalahandi and large parts of south western Odisha. Ghumura dance is still hidden in the village level in south western Odisha and some parts of bordering Andhra Pradesh and Chhattisgarh. Kalahandi region has taken a leading rule in popularising and retaining its unique identity of Ghumura dance. Ghumura dance has got the opportunity to represent the nation in international events Delhi, Moscow, and other places.

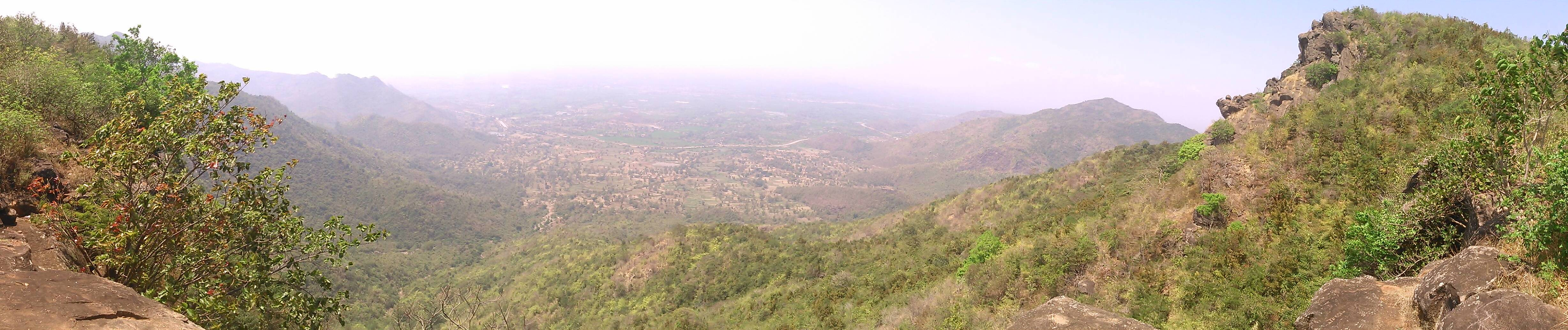
Panoramic View of Hello Point "Valley View"

== Education ==
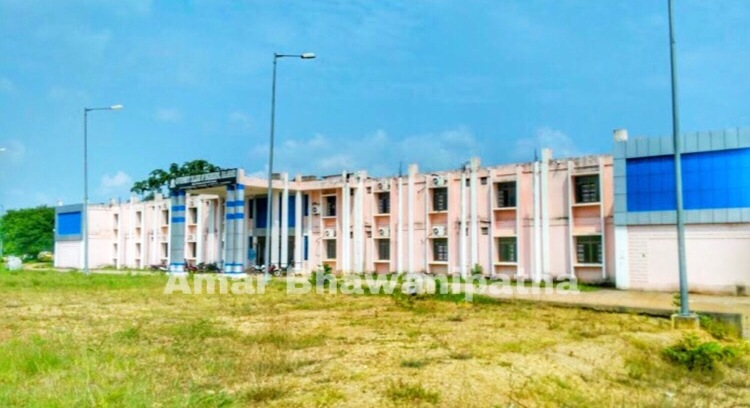
Government College of Engineering, Bhawanipatna

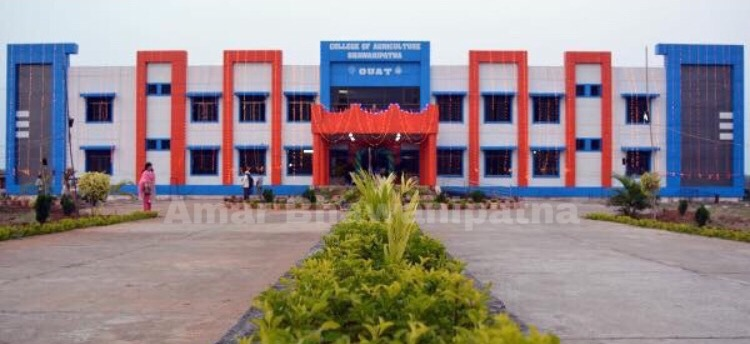
College of Agriculture, Bhawanipatna (OUAT)

Bhawanipatna is home to several institutions of higher education. The Western Odisha Development Council facilitated the establishment of a private medical college in the Junagarh block of Kalahandi in collaboration with a South India-based organisation. Although admissions began in September 2013, the institution was shut down in 2015 due to poor management.

=== Technical Colleges ===
- College of Agriculture, Bhawanipatna
- Government College of Engineering, Kalahandi

=== University ===
- Maa Manikeshwari University

== Infrastructure ==
=== Hospitals ===
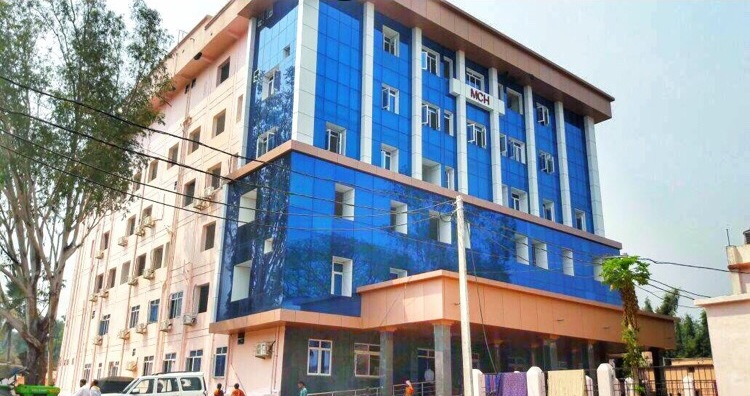
District Headquarters Hospital, Bhawanipatna

- District Headquarters Hospital, Bhawanipatna
- Maa Manikeswari Multi-speciality Hospital, Bhawanipatna
- Kesinga Hospital
- Sub-Divisional Hospital, Dharamgarh

=== Establishment ===
- Upper Indravati Hydro-electricity Project, Mukhiguda
- Vedanta Alumina Refinery, Lanjigarh (private)
- Ret Irrigation Project, Dhusguda Near Chhatikuda

== Politics ==
=== Vidhan sabha constituencies ===
The following is a list of the 5 Vidhan sabha constituencies of Kalahandi district and the elected members of that area

No.	Constituency	Reservation	Extent of the Assembly Constituency (Blocks)	Member of 15th Assembly	Party
77	Lanjigarh	ST	Lanjigarh, Thuamul Rampur, Jaipatana (part),, Bhawanipatna (part)	Balabhadra Majhi	BJD
78	Junagarh	None	Junagarh (NAC), Junagarh, Golamunda	Dibyashankar Mishra	BJD
79	Dharmagarh	None	Dharmagarh, Koksara, Kalampur, Jaipatana (part)	Mousadhi Bag	BJD
80	Bhawanipatna	SC	Bhawanipatna (M), Kesinga (NAC), Bhawanipatna (PART), Kesinga (part)	Pradipta Kumar Naik	BJP
81	Narla	None	Madanpur-Rampur, Narla, Karlamunda, Kesinga (part)	Dhaneswar Majhi	BJD

== Notable people ==
- Bhubaneswar Behera: Engineer, academic, administrator and author.
- Pratap Keshari Deo: Ruler, politician, social worker, archeologist and first visualized and took the initiative in the Indravati project.
- Ram Chandra Patra, IAS (retd.): (1919–2013) Bureaucrat, social worker and administrator who took the initiative in the Indravati project.
- Kishen Pattnaik: Socialist leader. born 1930 in Kalahandi. Became National president of Samajwadi Yuvjan Sabha and was elected to Lok Sabha from Sambalpur aged 32

== See also ==
- History of Kalahandi
- Kalahandi (poem)
- Ghumura Dance
- Kalahandia Oriya
