= Kalahandia Odia =

Indo-Aryan language variety of India

- Kalahandia
- କଳାହାଣ୍ଡିଆ
- Native to: India
- Region: Odisha (Kalahandi, Nuapada)
- Ethnicity: Odias
- Language family: Indo-European: Indo-Iranian; Indo-Aryan; Eastern; Odia; Kalahandia Odia
- Writing system: Odia

Language codes
- ISO 639-3: –

Kalahandia is a variety of Odia spoken in the region of Kalahandi and Nuapada district of Odisha state in India. Local weekly Odia newspaper such as Arjji and Kalahandi Express publish articles in standard Odia Form and Kalahandia Odia Form.

== Distinguishing features ==
Kalahandia Odia is distinct from standard Odia in terms of vocabulary, spelling and pronunciation. The vocabulary is a little mixture of standard Odia words and Sambalpuri words spoken with a distinct accent and cadence. Unlike standard Odia, in Kalahandia the final "a" sound is silent (e.g. Ghar ଘର୍ instead of Ghara ଘର). It has a typical vowel sound "ae" (as in marbu kaen ମରବୁ କାଏଁ) which is lacking in standard mainstream Odia. In verbs the "b" sound is replaced with "m" (as in Jimi ଜିମି instead of Jibi ଯିବି). Often the final vowel sound of mainstream Odia is shifted to the middle of a word after modification (e.g. Aji ଆଜି becomes Aej ଆଏଜ୍ and Rajya ରାଜ୍ୟ becomes Raej ରାଏଜ୍).

== Published work on Kalahandia ==
- Kalahandia Dhaga
- Kalahandia Dictionary
- Kalahandia Ghumura Songs

== Bibliography ==
- Mund, Parameswar (2020). Kalahandia Shabda Kosha. Delhi: Paschima Publications.
- Pradhan, Dr Tapan Kumar (2020). Kalahandi : The Untold Story. Kohinoor Books. ISBN 9788194579717.
