= Ghumura dance =

Folk dance from Odisha, India

Ghumura
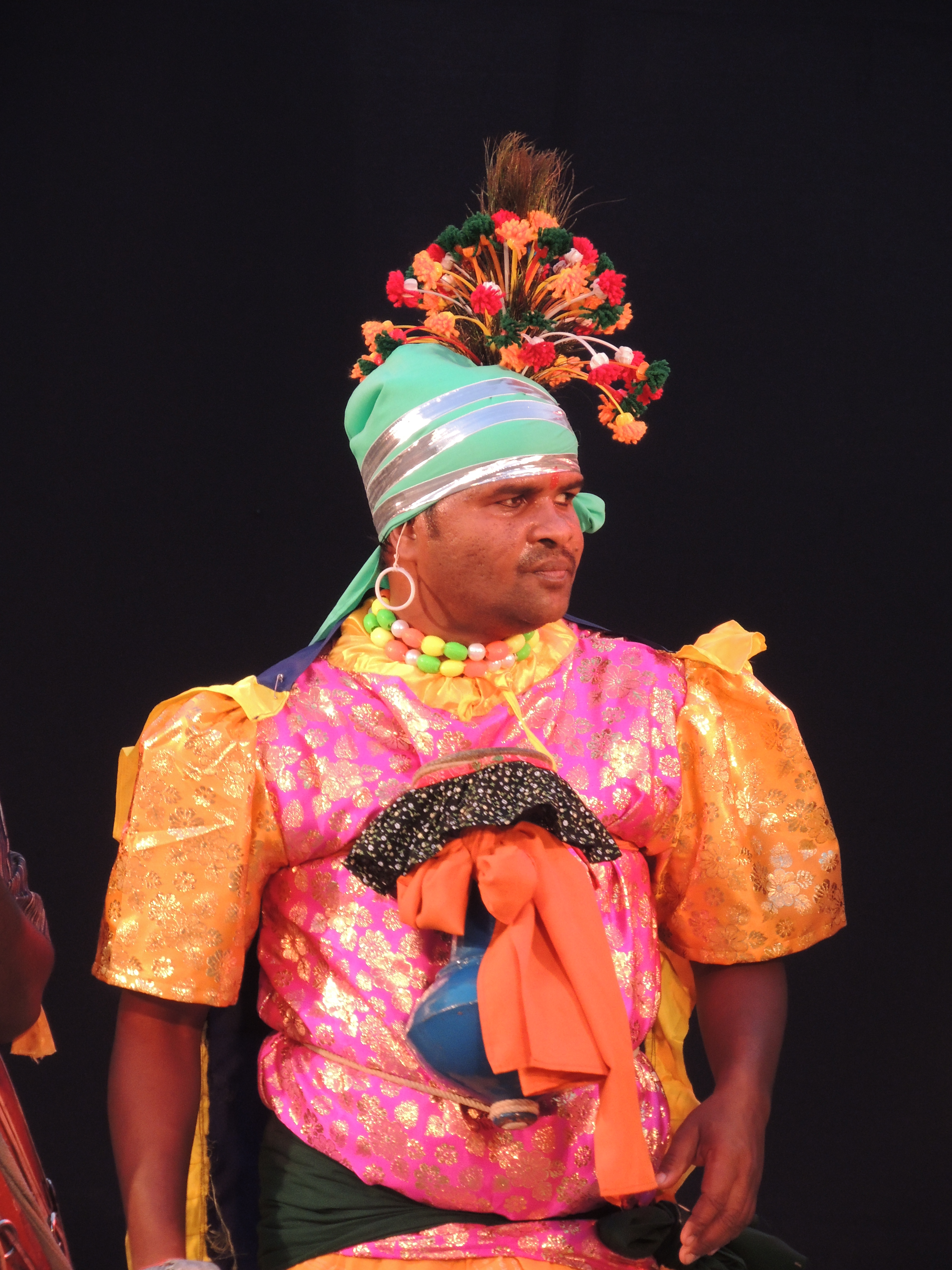
- An artist in traditional ghumurā attire
- Native name: ଘୁମୁରା
- Genre: Folk dance
- Origin: Odisha, India

Ghumura dance is a folk dance of Kalahandi district of the Indian state Odisha. It is classified as folk dance as the dress code of Ghumura resembles more like a tribal dance, but there are arguments about mudra and dance forms of Ghumura bearing more resemblance with other classical dance forms of India.

== Origin and history ==
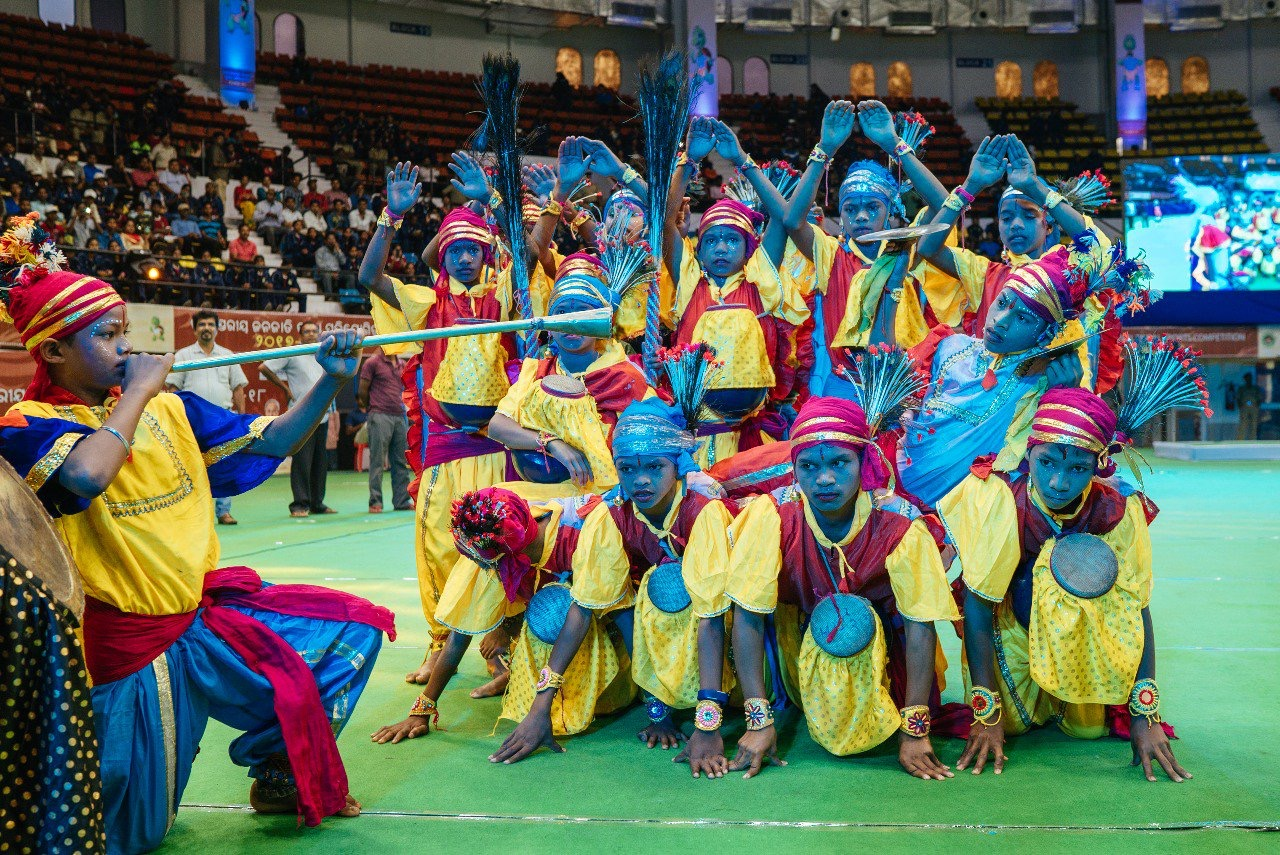
Ghumura Dance during Odisha Tribal sports meet.

=== Mythology ===
Beside historical evidence, the origin of Ghumura dance has taken into consideration public views and myths. Based on myth, poet Shivam Bhasin Panda wrote Ghumura Janma Bidhan in 1954. Nandini Bhasin and Gaganeswar have also described a myth regarding origin of Ghumura, in which they described that Chandra Dhwaja had originally established the dance and later it was taken over by a demon — Karttabirya Asura.

As per Chandi Purana Durga, the eternal deity of Shakti, asked all the Gods and Goddesses of heaven to lend their weapons, as instruments and conveyances to kill a demon king Mahisasur. One of the war-musical instruments collected was the Ghumura instrument that was formed by combination of a portion of Dambaru, a musical instrument of Lord Siva, and Veena of goddess Saraswati.

As per Mahabharata, Ghumura was used by Gods and Goddesses as a musical instrument during war. According to Sarala Mahabharata, during Satya Juga-Jenabali-Patana was the capital of the king Gogingh Daitya, grandson of Mahisasura. Many people accept that Mahisasura Jenabali-Patana of that age is the Junagarh of today. However, in the Madhya Parba of Mahabharat, Ghumura has been mentioned with description about killing of Gosingh Daitya. Sarala Dasa has also described it as the Rana-Badya (war music) of Mahisasura.

A few experts believed Ghumura was a war music (Rana-Badya) of Ravana, demon king of Lanka, and Lanka-garh. Goddess Lankeswari, the favorite goddess of Ravana, is worshiped in the region. According to them after Lanka was destroyed by Hanuman and after Ravana was killed, Goddess Lankeswari left Lanka and came to settle in Jenabali-Patana (now it is Junagarh, Kalahandi) where she is worshiped.

There are myths about the origin of Nishan and Tala. After building Chandrachuda Bindhani out of iron found from Bindhya Giri and covering its top with a skin of dead Bouta cow, it was inaugurated with Panchakshar-Mantra. Its parents Gaurab Gandharb and Urbasi called it Nishan. Likewise the Tala was created by a Saint-Kasyapa Risi. Nishan and Tala are considered as symbols of Radha-Krishna.

=== Archaeological aspects ===
Archaeological evidence proves that there are some cave painting from pre-historic period discovered from Gudahandi of Kalahandi and Yogi Matha of Nuapada district that looks like Ghumura, Damru and other attractive things. These rock art sites belongs to more than 8000 B.C. and from such painting the antiquity of musical instrument Ghumura and Damru can be imagined. It is also proved that during mythological age, Kalahandi had prosperous and developed civilization. The origin of Ghumura goes back to ancient times.

There is a beautiful waterfall in the river valley of Indravati, which was initially recognized by Chindak Nagas of Chakrakot. Many believe that Ghumura dance originated from this river valley and gradually spread into the areas between Indravati and Mahanadi, indicating this dance form belongs to the 10th century A.D. On the other hand, analysts opine that 'Banka-Paika' of Kalampur had carried Lankeswari deity with a grand procession of Ghumura music to Junagarh in 1008 A.D. when the Naga dynasty shifted their old capital from Jugasaipatna to Junagarh. The terracotta and stone objects found from medieval site in Nehena, 3 km from Khariar, resembles Ghumura object dated to the 9th and 10th centuries. In the 12th century A.D. Ghumura dance was already popular, which is evident from a scene of one person playing the instrument Ghumura in a stone-hole of Nritya Mandir of Konark Sun Temple. Bhimeswar temple in Bhubaneswar shows another scene of Ghumura dance reconfirming that origin of Ghumura dance was in the 10th century A.D.

Dr Mahendra Kumar Mishra, a noted folklorist and ethnomusicologist of Kalahandi, has researched extensively on ethnography of Ghumra dance of kalahandi, which can be accessed in the website www.scribd.com. Dr Mishra has widely discussed on structure, function and socio-cultural context of Ghumra dance of Kalahandi adjoining Bastar and Chhatishgarh and part of Odisha in his well-researched book Kalahandira Lokasanskruti (1996) published by Freidns Publishers, Cuttack.

== Transformation of war music into folk music and dance ==
In mythological ages Ghumura was a favorite music instrument of Gods and Demons during war, which was followed in subsequent time as the heroic war music by successive kings and soldiers of Odisha, especially in Kalahandi. Many kings in the region such as Eastern Ganga dynasty had well-organized soldiers with Ghumura as their primary war music. During that period, the Ghumura song hadn't been composed nor sung.

Only its music and dance were being used during wartime to make the soldiers excited with the spirit of fighting. Later on the song was integrated with the music and dance of Ghumura, since it was regarded as the only medium of exercise for body building and entertainment during leisure time of Paikas or soldiers. During British rule, the Paikas were often inactive and used to get sufficient leisure time, for which the Ghumura was developed by them as a primary means of entertainment.

Afterwards poets and writers in general of Odisha and in particular of Kalahandi took initiatives to compose songs of Ghumura while writing about Devi bandana (hymns or prayer to deities), glory of dynasties and mythological studies. In this way Chanda-Chaupadis of poet Upendra Bhanja, Dinakrushna, Abhimanyu Samanta Singar, etc. gradually entered into Ghumura, which made it much more enchanting. As a result, common people living in the rural areas of Kalahandi became very attracted by this music, song and dance of Ghumura and formed many Ghumura groups to develop and spread. In this respect, the royal families of Bhawanipatna, Jayapatna, Madanpur Rampur, Khariar etc. also highly encouraged and helped these groups of village folk.

During religious and cultural festivals like 'Dasahara' many of these groups used to gather together on the altars of deities, e.g., Manikeswari of Bhawanipatna, Lankeswari of Jungarh, Raktambari of Khariar, Dakeshwari of Madanpur Rampur, Budha Raja of Ampani etc. However, for the distinctive recognition of the Ghumura group reform and development was made in the manner and nature of dress, painting, dance, music and song. While performing, the Ghumura dancers and singers of each group used to ask very complicated question related to socio-economic and political problems to their competent opposite group through the medium of the songs. This gave birth to the contemporary form of Ghumura-Ladhei or Badi-Ghumura in Kalahandi, which is very meaningful, attractive and enchanting.

== Etymological meaning ==
Ghumura is an earthen pitcher and the imagination of the preparation of such pitcher into a musical instrument is a polygenetic development. 'Ghumura' is derived from 'Ghum+u+Ra'. 'Ghum' means bowl like pitcher made of soil or clay and having a thin face with big belly. 'U' means 'Lord Siva' and 'Ra' mean 'Raba' or 'Dhowni' (vibrating sound). Earthen clay pot is locally known as 'Ghumuri', which was largely used by females to reserve water for home use. The male version of 'Ghumuri' is 'Ghumura'. Since Ghumura is a male dance form and it is found in almost all parts of the human culture that equipment and appliances invented for human use have been the foundation to the invention of musical instruments, the derivation of name of Ghumura from 'Ghumuri' signifies such claim.

== Classical form ==
- Nrutta, Nrutya and Natya
- Nrutya
- Sangita (song)
- Tala and Laya

== Dance form ==
- Circular Dance
- Circular or Semi-Circular Dance
- Triangular Dance
- Rectangular Dance
- Go Spada Dance: Cow Foot Dance
- Sheep Fighting Dance (Mesha Yudha Dance)
- Cross (Chaki) Dance
- Square Dance
- Go Chanda Dance
- Hen Fighting (Kakuta Yudha) Dance

== Ghumura in folk tradition ==
Though Ghumura has been included in folk culture, it is a widespread dance in the Kalahandi region. It is in unknown if in its early period whether it was a caste-based dance or not. By the time when Ghumura entered into the sphere of folk dance, above from the level of tribal dance, it was extensively performed by almost all castes and communities. Perhaps, Ghumura was a caste-based dance of a particular caste in its beginning and later on extended to different castes and communities. It was then widely accepted as a mass dance from folk dance.

== Development and spread ==
Ghumura dance has had the opportunity to represent the nation in international events in Delhi, Moscow, and other places.
