= Ambodala =

Village in Odisha, India

- Village
- Location within Odisha Location within India
- Coordinates: 19°50′02″N 83°27′26″E
- Country: India
- State: Odisha
- District: Rayagada

Population
  - Total: 3,360
- Time zone: UTC+5:30 (IST)
- Postal code: 765021

Ambodala is a village in Rayagada, Odisha, India.

== History ==
On 17 June 2023, four wagons derailed off the train tracks while carrying goods. There were no casualties.

== Transportation ==
The village is served by the Ambodala railway station of the East Coast Railway network.
