= Ambodala railway station =

Railway station in Odisha

Ambodala

General information
- Location: Ambodala, Odisha; India
- Coordinates: 19°50′03″N 83°27′28″E
- System: Indian Railways station
- Owner: Ministry of Railways, Indian Railways
- Line: Jharsuguda–Vizianagaram line
- Platforms: 2
- Tracks: 2

Construction
- Structure type: Standard (on ground)
- Parking: No

Other information
- Status: Functioning
- Station code: AMB
- Zone(s): East Coast Railway
- Division(s): Sambalpur
Location
- Location within India Location within Odisha

Ambodala railway station is a railway station on the East Coast Railway network in the state of Odisha, India. It serves Ambodala village. Its code is AMB. It has two platforms. Passenger, Express and Superfast trains halt at Ambodala railway station.

== Major trains ==
- Korba–Visakhapatnam Express
- Dhanbad–Alappuzha Express
- Bilaspur–Tirupati Express
- Sambalpur–Rayagada Intercity Express
- Tapaswini Express
- Samata Express
- Samaleshwari Express
- Durg–Jagdalpur Express

== See also ==
- Rayagada district
