= Kalahandi State =

Princely state of India

Coordinates: 20.083°N 83.2°E

Kalahandi State Karond State
- Princely State of British India
- 1005–1948
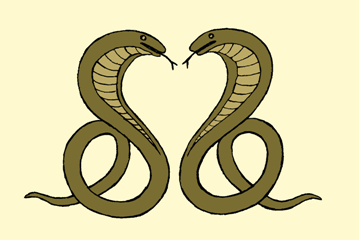
- Flag Coat of arms

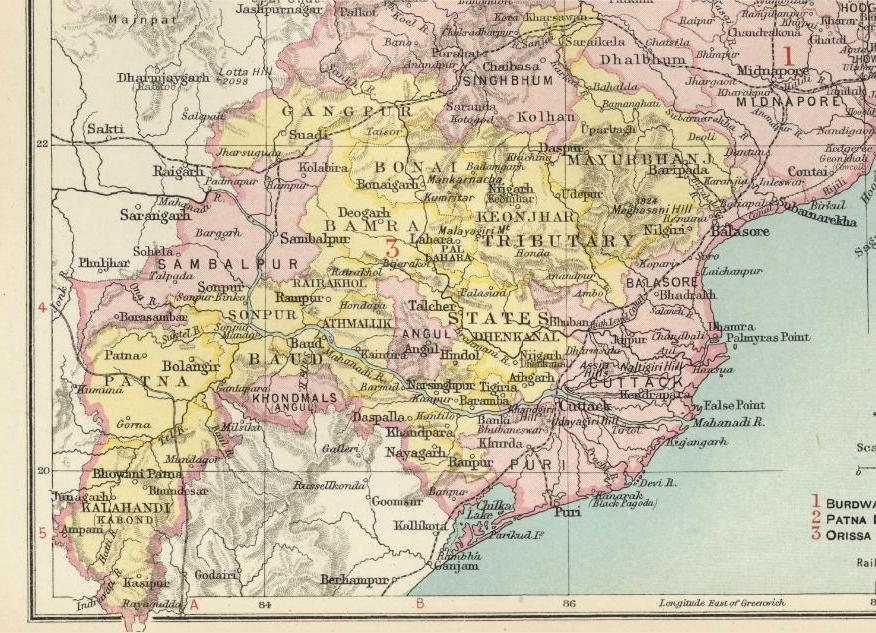
- Kalahandi State in the Imperial Gazetteer of India
- Capital: Bhawanipatna
- Area
  - 1892: 9,700 km^{2} (3,700 sq mi)
  - 1941: 9,217 km^{2} (3,559 sq mi)
- Population
  - 1892: 224,548
  - 1941: 597,940
- History
  - Established: 1005
  - Accession to the Union of India: 1948
Preceded by	Succeeded by
Eastern Ganga dynasty	India
- Today part of: Western Odisha, India

Kalahandi State, also known as Karond State, was one of the princely states of India during the British Raj. It was recognized as a state in 1874 and had its capital in Bhawanipatna. Its last ruler signed the accession to the Indian Union on 1 January 1948. The present titular head of the former state is Anant Pratap Deo who resides in the Kalahandi Palace in Bhawanipatna

== History ==
Kalahandi was the largest of the 26 feudatory states of Odisha. According to local tradition, the state originated with Raja Raghunath Sai of the Naga dynasty, who traced descent from the Nagabanshis of Chotanagpur of Eastern India, beginning to rule the Kalahandi area in 1005 CE. As per the traditional records preserved in Kalahandi Darbar, the Nagas succeeded the Gangas in Kalahandi when the last Ganga Governor of Kalahandi, Jagannath Deo's only daughter was married to Raghunath Sai, a prince of the Naga clan. However, historians have disputed the early date for the establishment of Naga dynasty rule in Kalahandi but most agree the Nagas succeeded the Gangas as the feudatories in the region during the 15th century, taking advantage of the weakness of the central authority as the power of the Eastern Ganga dynasty started to decline in Odisha. Hence the state's coat of arms had two cobras facing each other and the presiding deity of the dynasty is Manikeswari.

In August 1947 Kalahandi became part of the Eastern States Union, an entity that was formed in Rajpur and that gathered most of the princely states of Orissa and Chhattisgarh. The Eastern States Union was dissolved in 1948. The formerly princely state's territory is now within Kalahandi District.

== List of rulers ==
The rulers of Kalahandi princely state were granted a hereditary salute of 9 guns by the British.

Rulers of the Naga dynasty of Kalahandi are–

- Raghunath Sai (1005–1040)
- Pratap Narayan Deo (1040–1072)
- Birabar Deo (1072–1108)
- Jugasai Deo I (1108–1142)
- Udenarayan Deo (1142–1173)
- Harichandra Deo (1173–1201)
- Ramachandra Deo (1201–1234)
- Gopinath Deo (1234–1271)
- Balabhadra Deo (1271–1306
- Raghuraj Deo (1306–1337)
- Rai Singh Deo I (1337–1366)
- Haria Deo (1366–1400)
- Jugasai Deo II (1400–1436)
- Pratap Narayan Deo II (1436–1468)
- Hari Rudra Deo (1468–1496)
- Anku Deo (1496–1528)
- Pratap Deo (1528–1564)
- Raghunath Deo (1564–1594)
- Biswambhar Deo (1594–1627)
- Rai Singh Deo II (1627–1658)
- Dusmant Deo (1658–1693)
- Jugasai Deo III (1693–1721)
- Khadag Rai Deo (1721–1747)
- Rai Singh Deo III (1747–1771)
- Purusottam Deo (1771–1796)
- Jugasai Dei IV (1796–1831)
- Fateh Narayan Deo (1831–1853)
- Udit Pratap Deo I (1853–1881)
- Raghu Keshari Deo (1894–1897)
- Court of Wards (1897–1917)
- Brajamohan Deo (1917–1939)
- Pratap Keshari Deo (1939–1947)

=== Titular rulers ===
- Pratap Keshari Deo (1948 – 8 October 2001)
- Udit Pratap Deo II (8 October 2001 – 2 November 2019)
- Anant Pratap Deo (2 November 2019 – current)

== Gallery ==
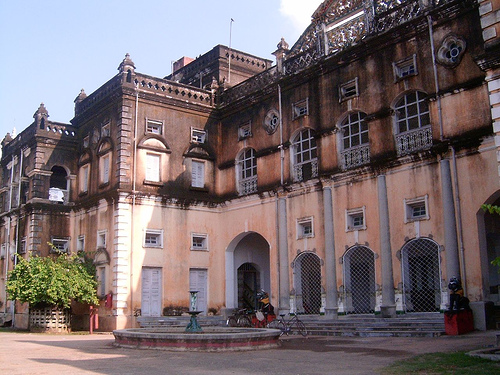
View of the royal palace of the Kalahandi Rajas in Bhawanipatna

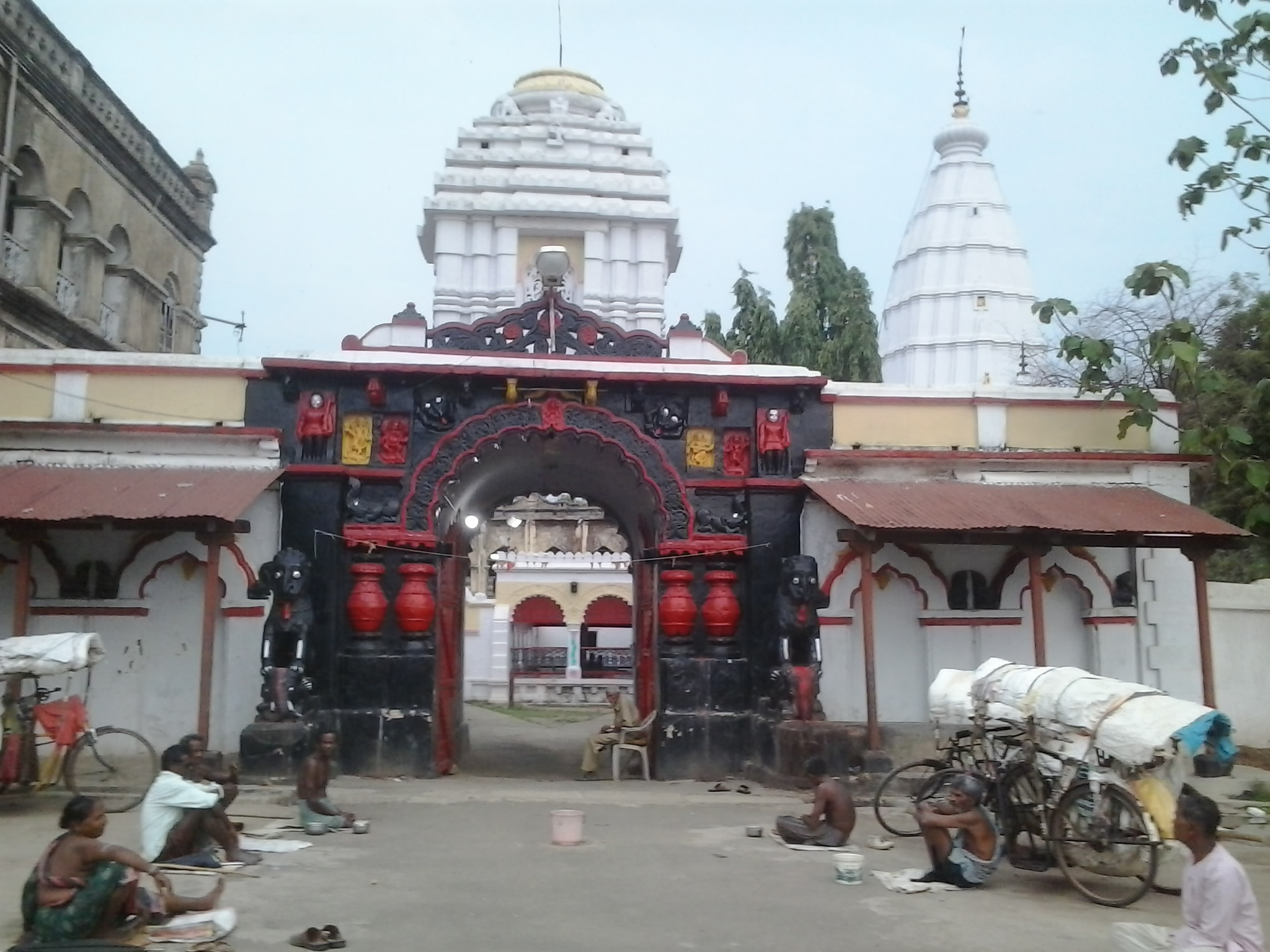
Manikeswari Temple at Bhawanipatna

== See also ==
- Eastern States Agency
- History of Kalahandi
- Political integration of India
