= Dharmagada =

- Town
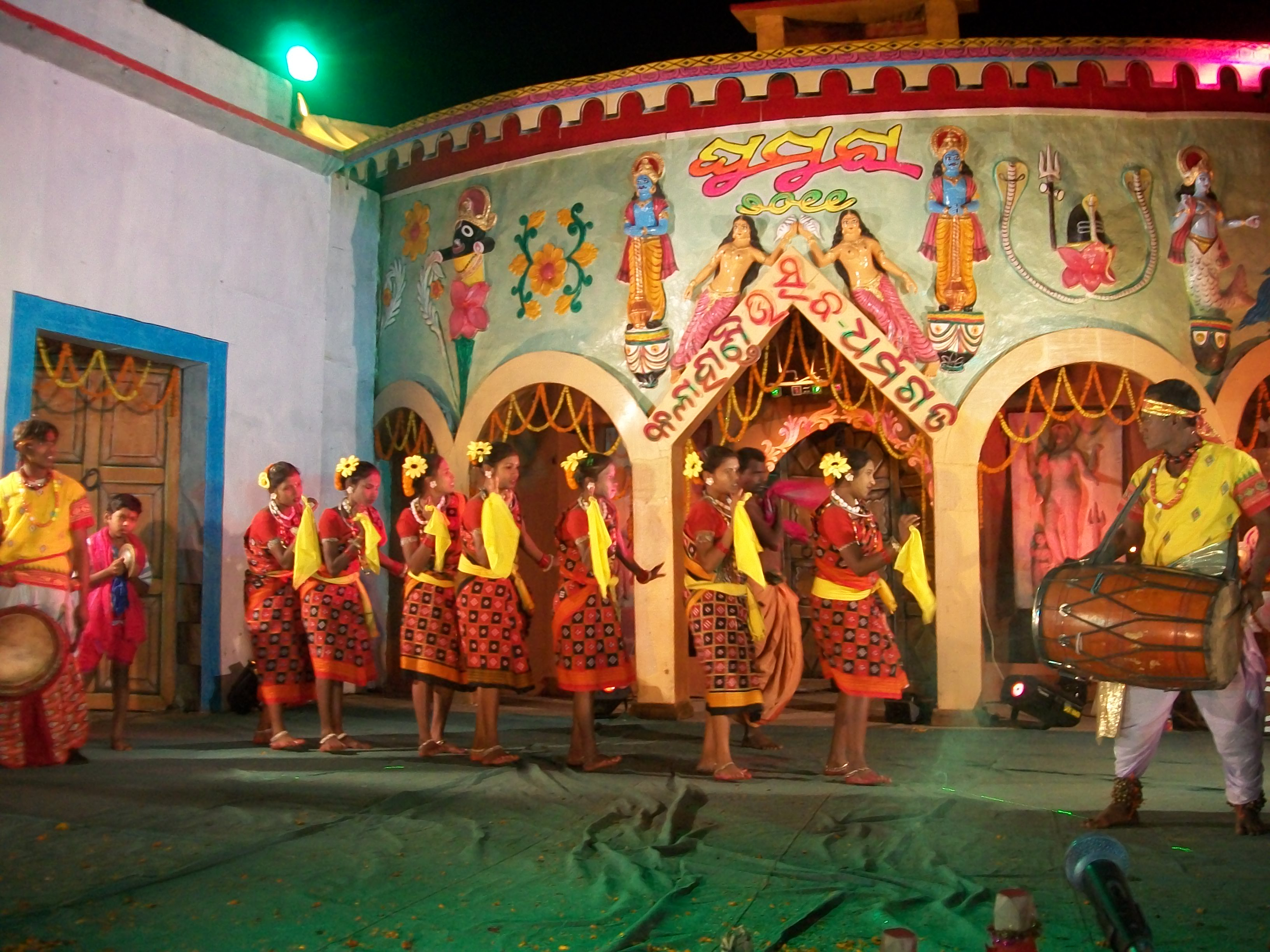
- Kalahandi Utsav 2011

- Location in Odisha, India Dharmagada (India)
- Coordinates: 19.868941°N 82.77319°E
- Country: India
- State: Odisha
- District: Kalahandi

Government
  - Type: Notified Area Council (N.A.C.)
  - Body: Dharmagada N.A.C.
  - Member of Legislative Assembly: Sudhir Ranjan Pattjoshi (BJP)
  - Member of Parliament: Malvika Devi (BJP)

Languages
  - Official: Odia, English
- Time zone: UTC+5:30 (IST)
- PIN: 766015
- STD Telephone code: 06672
- Sub-division: Dharmagada
- Block: Dharmagada
- Odisha Legislative Assembly Constituency: Dharamgarh
- Lok Sabha Constituency: Kalahandi

Dharmagada formerly Dharamgarh is one of the sub-divisional headquarters in the district of Kalahandi in Odisha, India and it is one of the three Notified Area Councils in Kalahandi. It is also referred as Dharmagarh. Dharamgarh is known as the granary of Kalahandi district. The Dharamgarh sub-division of Kalahandi includes Golamunda, Koksara, Jaipatna, Kalampur, Junagarh and Dharamgarh blocks.

== History and economy ==
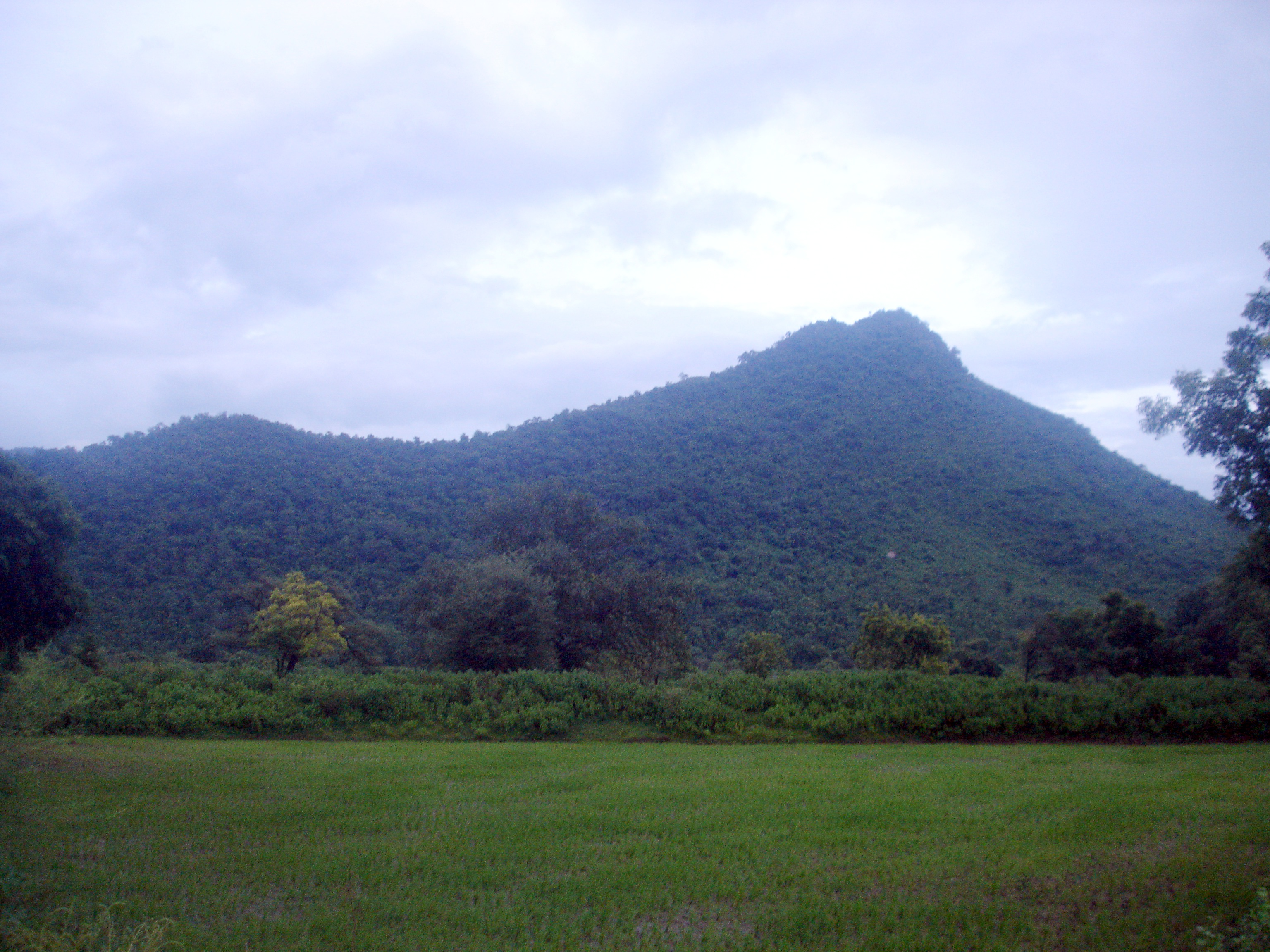
Bandhkana, Dharamgarh sub-division

Dharamgarh became a sub-divisional headquarter in post-independence period when Kalahandi joined Odisha state. Dharamgarh sub-division is historically well known for rice production in the region. In post Upper Indravati irrigation project it among the leading rice producing sub-division in Odisha. Kalahandi contributed largest number of rice mill, out of which majority of the rice mills are in Dharamgarh sub-division.
