= Jayapatana =

- Town
- Location in Odisha, India Jayapatana (India)
- Coordinates: 19°28′14″N 82°59′50″E
- Country: India
- State: Odisha
- District: Kalahandi

Languages
  - Official: Odia
- Time zone: UTC+5:30 (IST)
- Vehicle registration: OD 08
- Website: odisha.gov.in

Jayapatana previously Jaipatna is a town and Notified Area Council in the Kalahandi District in Odisha State. It is surrounded by the Eastern Ghats range.
