= Bhubaneswar Behera =

Indian writer and scholar (1916–2001)

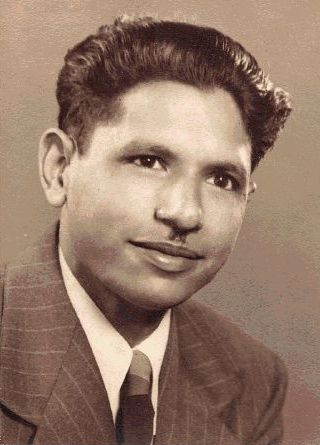
- Born: 1 January 1916; Kashibahal, Kalahandi, British India
- Died: 15 April 2001 (aged 85); Bhawanipatna, Orissa, India
- Education: B.Sc Physics in Ravenshaw College, Cuttack (1939)
- Spouse: Uma Devi Behera
- Children: Yashodhara Mishra (One daughter) and 3 sons
- Engineering career
- Discipline: Civil engineering
- Institutions: National Institute of Technology, Patna (1943)
- Projects: Jog hydropower project
- Awards: Sarala Puraskar Sarala Samman

Bhubaneswar Behera (1 January 1916 – 15 April 2001) was an engineer, writer and scholar from the Kalahandi district of Odisha.

== Early life ==
Behera was born in a Brahmin family in the village of Kashibahal, a former state of Kalahandi. He was educated at Bhawanipatna and graduated in 1935. In 1939 he obtained a degree in physics from Ravenshaw College in Cuttack then went on to graduate with a degree in civil engineering from the Bihar College of Engineering in Patna in 1943. He served an apprenticeship with the Department of Works and Irrigation in the former state of Mysore, Government of Orissa, and in February 1945 was appointed as an assistant engineer in the Jog Hydro power project, where his special assignment concerned irrigation under the Kalindi, Darbar. Bhubaneswar Behera was married to Uma Devi. He has a daughter, Professor Yashodhara Mishra, and three sons: one is a medical doctor, another a police officer Binay Behera, and the third a railway officer.

== Career ==
Behera came across the perennial Indravati flowing across the Thuamul Rampur Plateau of Kalahandi, a tributary of the Godavari, running parallel to the Eastern Ghats. He visualized the diversion of the river Indravati to the Hati River to create an artificial waterfall from a height of 2,000 feet. This artificial waterfall would generate hydroelectric power that would ensure the perennial supply of water for irrigation. He prepared a preliminary scheme for the same and submitted it to the Maharaja for consideration. The Maharaja was thrilled with his work.

Behera was selected by the Government of India as one of the Post-war Reconstruction Scholars to pursue higher education abroad. He studied hydraulics and fluid mechanics at the State University of Iowa and wrote his Master's thesis on "A Length Criterion for the Hydraulic Jump" in a collaborative effort with his Indian peer, Asrar Ahmad Qureshy, with Professor Poesy serving as their Adviser in 1947. He was trained in model studies and dam construction in Denver, Colo., and project planning under the Tennessee Valley Authority.

He joined the Kalahandi State Government as an irrigation engineer in 1947. The princely state of Kalahandi was incorporated into the state of Odisha in 1948. "Professor" Behera was deputed to work on the Hirakud Dam project, where he worked as the assistant engineer and executive engineer until 1956. Over this period, Behera produced two valuable research papers: "A Mathematical Formula for Design of Earth Slopes" and "Mathematical Formula for Non-Silting and Non-Eroding Velocities in Erodible Channels" for the journal of The Institution of Engineers (India). Both papers were highly appraised.

Behera joined the University College of Engineering, Burla, as a professor of Civil Engineering in 1958. He eventually became the principal of the college in 1961. He later joined the Regional Engineering College in Rourkela in February 1962 as its first principal, and remained thus till 1971. He was appointed the vice-chancellor of Sambalpur University in 1971 and held this position till 1976. In 1977, the Government of India dispatched him to the Democratic Republic of Liberia in West Africa as an adviser for technical education.

He held many other roles in the Government of Odisha. He was appointed as a member of the Das Committee by the Government of Odisha to recommend the establishment of colleges in the state. Behera also worked as a member of the Orissa State Planning Board and the Union Public Service Commission until 1981. He officially retired from his work on January 1, 1981, and returned to his native village, Mundraguda, in the Dharmagarh subdivision of Kalahandi District, Orissa.

== Other endeavors ==
Before Behera became a member of the engineering faculty, he started a monthly Odia magazine called Saptarshi. He wanted to encourage students to read and write in Odia and he wrote editorials for the magazine himself, soon becoming a popular Odia prose writer. His Odia travelogue Paschima Africa re Odis Dhennki is a textbook in many universities of his native state. He has written eight books in Odia; his book of essays, Suna Parikshya, earned him the Odisha Sahitya Academy Award, while his novel Ga on-Ra-Dhaka won him the prestigious Sara la Award. He was also honored with the Nandihosh Award, the Utkal Ratna by Odisha Sahitya Samaj, the Visvesvaraya Award, the Sara la Samman and the title of "Sahitya Sudhakar." He was also conferred a doctorate of science (Honor is Causal) from Sambalpur University and Utkal University. Behera's paper titled "Optimum Height of Multipurpose Reservoirs," co-authored with P.K. Mohapatra, and his paper “Flexible Foundation," co-authored with A.P. Mishra, earned the Ministry of Irrigation Gold Medal and The Institution of Engineers (India) Gold Medal, respectively. The Institution of Engineers (India) Odisha State Center honored him with the title of "Senior Engineer" of the state on the occasion of the 50th anniversary celebrations of Indian independence in 1998.

== Awards ==
These are the list of all the award:-

- His essay book Suna Parikshya earned him the Odisha Sahitya Academy Award.
- His novel Gaon-ro-Daka earned him the prestigious Sarala Award.
- He is a recipient of both the Sarala Sanman and the Prajatantra Prachar Samiti Essay Award.
- The Utkal Pathak Sansad, Cuttack, has conferred the title of Sahitya Sudhakar on him.
- Sambalpur University and Utkal University have conferred a Doctorate of Science (Honoris Causa) on him.
- He won the Utkal Ratna in 1998.

== Prof Bhubaneswar Behera Central Library ==
Professor Bhubaneswar Behera Central Library, the library of Sambalpur University, is named in his honor.
