= Bhawanipatna =

Bhabanipatana Bhawanipatna
- Town
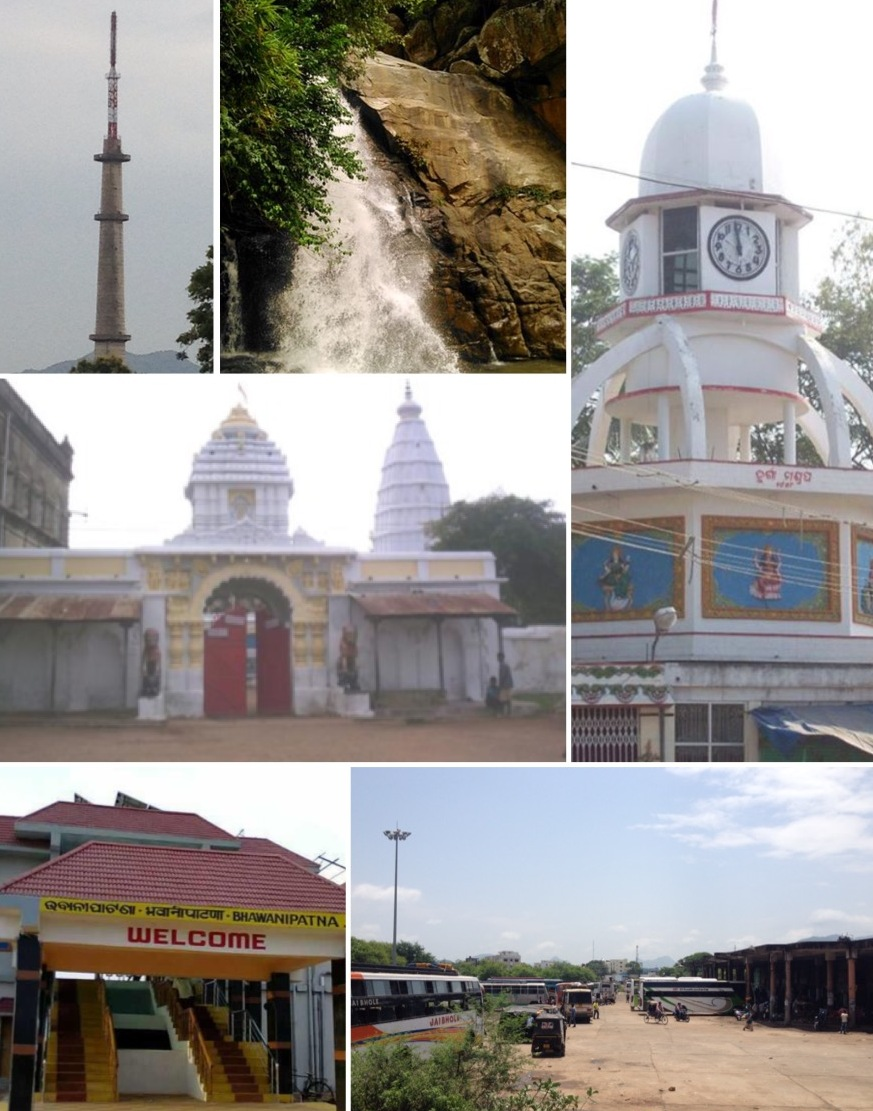
- Bhawanipatna clockwise from top left: Doordarshan Tower, Phurlijharan, Durga Mandap (Big Ben of Bhawanipatna), Manikeshwari Mandir, Bhawanipatna Railway Station, Bhawanipatna Bus Stand

- Location within Odisha Location within India
- Coordinates: 19.91°N 83.128°E
- Country: India
- State: Odisha
- Named for: The leading deity Bhawani-Shankar

Government
  - Type: Municipality
  - Body: Municipality
  - MP: Malvika Devi
  - MLA: Sagar Charan Das
- Elevation: 248 m (814 ft)

Population (2011)
  - Total: 69,045
- Demonym: Bhabanipatania

Languages
  - Official: Odia English
- Time zone: UTC+5:30 (IST)
- PIN: 766001, 766002
- Telephone code: 06670
- Vehicle registration: OD-08
- UN/LOCODE: IN BWIP
- Website: kalahandi.nic.in

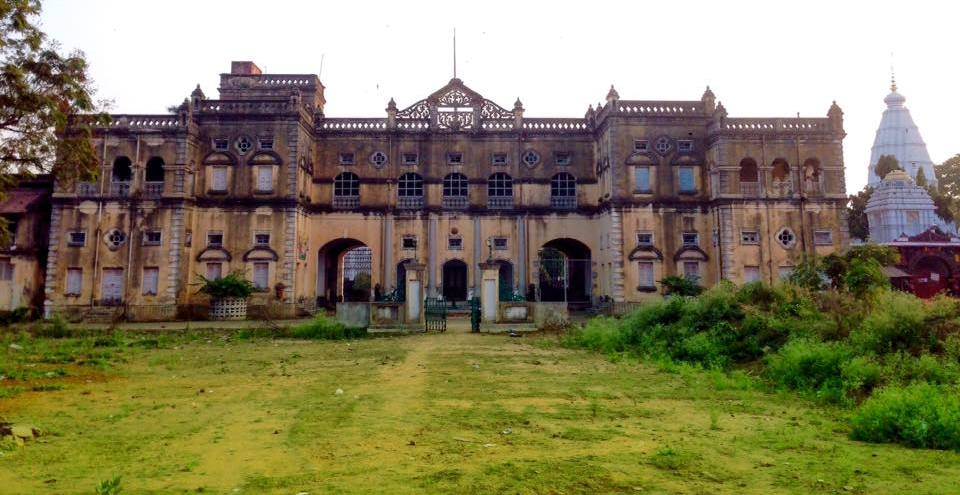
Kalahandi Palace

Bhawanipatna officially Bhabanipatana is a town and the headquarter of Kalahandi district in the state of Odisha, India. Bhawanipatna has numerous temples dedicated to different deities of the Hindu pantheon.

== Geography and climate ==
Bhawanipatna is located at 19.9°N 83.17°E. It has an average elevation of 248 m (814 ft). It is located in the center of large mountains and plateaus, with the mountainous Eastern Ghats in its eastern frontier.

== Demographics ==
As of the 2011 India census, Bhawanipatna had a population of 69,045, or 83,756 including its suburbs. The population of children 6 years old or under was 7,407, which was 10.73% of the total population. In Bhawanipatna Municipality, the female sex ratio is 945 against the state average of 979. Moreover, the child sex ratio in Bhawanipatna is around 911, compared to the Odisha state average of 941.

The literacy rate of Bhawanipatna city is 85.00%, higher than the state average of 72.87%. In Bhawanipatna, male literacy is 90.95%, while the female literacy rate is 78.72%, according to the 2011 census.

== Politics ==
The current MLA from Bhawanipatna Assembly Constituency is Pradipta Kumar Naik of BJP, who won the seat in the State Legislative election of 2019.

Member of the Legislative Assembly	Party	Year Elected
Pradipta Kumar Naik	BJP	2019
Anam Naik	Biju Janata Dal	2014
Dusmanta Kumar Naik	INC	2009
Pradipta Kumar Naik	BJP	1995, 2000, 2004
Ajit Das	JD	1990
Bhaktacharan Das	JNP	1985
Dayanidhi Naik	INC(I)	1980
Dayanidhi Naik	INC	1977

Bhawanipatna is part of the Kalahandi constituency, currently held by Basanta Kumar Panda, and before that by Arka Keshari Deo, who was the grandson of Maharaj Pratap Kesari Deo of Kalahandi.

=== Climate ===
Bhawanipatna has a tropical wet and dry climate, and temperatures remain moderate throughout the year, except March–June, which can be extremely hot. The temperature in April–May sometimes rises above 48 °C (118 °F). The summer months have dry and hot winds, and the temperature can go up to 50 °C (122 °F). The city receives about 1,300 millimetres (51 in) of rain, mostly in the monsoon season from late June to early October. Winters last from November to January and are mild, although lows can fall to 5 °C (41 °F).

Climate data for Bhawanipatna (1981–2010, extremes 1968–2012)
Month	Jan	Feb	Mar	Apr	May	Jun	Jul	Aug	Sep	Oct	Nov	Dec	Year
Record high °C (°F)	35.5 (95.9)	39.5 (103.1)	42.3 (108.1)	45.9 (114.6)	47.8 (118.0)	48.3 (118.9)	39.5 (103.1)	37.7 (99.9)	35.7 (96.3)	36.0 (96.8)	38.0 (100.4)	34.5 (94.1)	48.3 (118.9)
Mean daily maximum °C (°F)	28.5 (83.3)	32.3 (90.1)	35.5 (95.9)	39.5 (103.1)	41.0 (105.8)	36.1 (97.0)	31.1 (88.0)	30.3 (86.5)	31.1 (88.0)	31.4 (88.5)	29.4 (84.9)	28.2 (82.8)	32.9 (91.2)
Mean daily minimum °C (°F)	12.5 (54.5)	15.6 (60.1)	20.3 (68.5)	24.7 (76.5)	26.8 (80.2)	25.9 (78.6)	24.3 (75.7)	23.6 (74.5)	23.3 (73.9)	20.5 (68.9)	15.8 (60.4)	12.7 (54.9)	20.5 (68.9)
Record low °C (°F)	4.5 (40.1)	6.0 (42.8)	8.5 (47.3)	16.0 (60.8)	14.5 (58.1)	14.0 (57.2)	14.0 (57.2)	13.0 (55.4)	13.0 (55.4)	11.5 (52.7)	7.4 (45.3)	5.2 (41.4)	4.5 (40.1)
Average rainfall mm (inches)	8.9 (0.35)	11.7 (0.46)	17.3 (0.68)	21.4 (0.84)	39.4 (1.55)	196.2 (7.72)	281.0 (11.06)	315.2 (12.41)	199.1 (7.84)	79.1 (3.11)	10.0 (0.39)	9.4 (0.37)	1,188.7 (46.80)
Average rainy days	0.6	0.9	1.5	2.0	2.8	8.4	12.7	12.8	9.2	3.8	0.7	0.6	55.9
Average relative humidity (%) (at 17:30 IST)	46	43	35	33	34	54	74	77	75	66	55	49	54
Source: India Meteorological Department

== Transport ==
=== Air ===
Utkela Airstrip (VEUK) is present near the city (22 km, 14 mi) which was scheduled to be operational in August 2023 with daily flights to the state capital Bhubaneshwar by private air service provider Air Odisha under UDAN scheme by Ministry of Civil Aviation.

Lanjigarh Airstrip (58 km, 36 mi) is private airstrip conducting VIP and chartered planes. Other nearby airports are Swami Vivekananda Airport at Raipur, Chhattisgarh (262 km (163 mi) away), and Biju Patnaik International Airport in Bhubaneswar (427 km away by road and 631 km by rail).

=== Rail ===
Bhawanipatna railway station was inaugurated on 12 August 2012. It is situated on the Lanjigarh–Junagarh rail line. Currently there are 4 trains (1 express and 3 passenger) running from Bhawanipatna to Bhubanneshwar, Raipur, Visakhapatnam and Sambalpur.

== Notable people ==
- Rendo Majhi – A freedom fighter in Odisha, who started the Kondha Revolution against the British in 1853.
- Sujeet Kumar (politician) – Rajya Sabha Member, policy maker.
- Bhubaneswar Behera – Engineer, academic, administrator, and author.
- Ram Chandra Patra, IAS (retd.) (1919-2013) – Bureaucrat, social worker, and administrator acknowledged for his simplicity and administration, and for taking initiative in the Indravati project. He was the first IAS from Kalahandi.
- Kishan Patnaik – Socialist leader. He was born in 1930 into a lower-middle-class family in Kalahandi. Mr Patnaik worked in the youth wing of Samajwadi Yuvjan Sabha and soon rose to become its national president. He was elected to Lok Sabha from Sambalpur at the age of 32 and was one of handful members who turned the Lok Sabha into a real forum to discuss matters of national importance. He was perhaps the first person to bring the issue of starvation death in Kalahandi to the Indian parliament. Mr. Patnaik never lost sight of this fundamental plight of rural India, and securing the right to livelihood for the people on the margin therefore always remained central to his politics and to his vision of development.
