= Sardar Sarovar Dam =

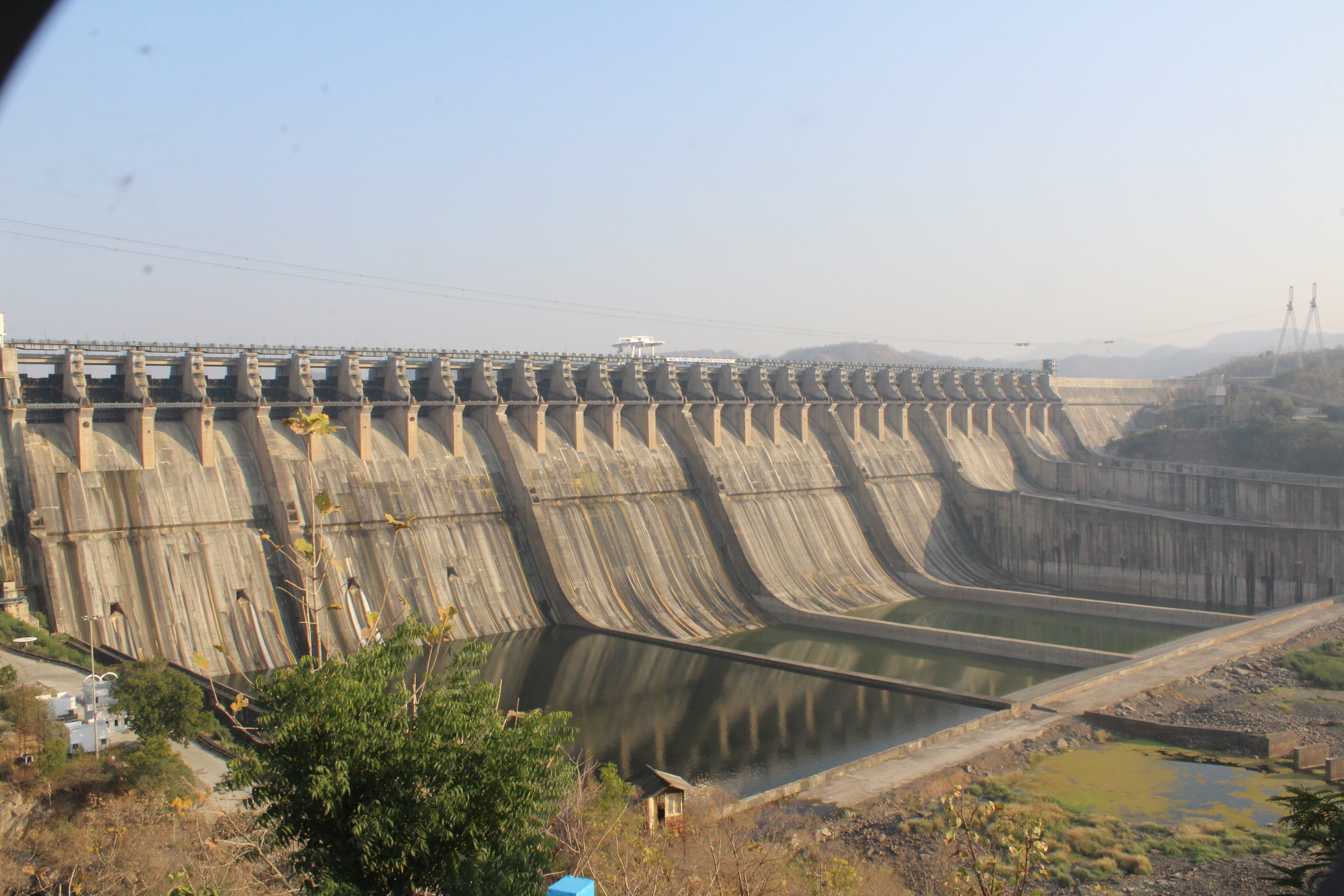
- The Sardar Sarovar Dam on Narmada river

- Location within Gujarat
- Interactive map of Sardar Sarovar Dam
- Official name: Sardar Sarovar Dam
- Location: Navagam, Kevadia, Narmada District, Gujarat, India
- Coordinates: 21°49′49″N 73°44′50″E
- Status: Operational
- Construction began: April 1987
- Opening date: 17 September 2017
- Owner: Government of Gujarat
- Operator: Sardar Sarovar Narmada Nigam Limited

Dam and spillways
- Type of dam: Gravity dam
- Impounds: Narmada River
- Height: 138.68 m (455.0 ft)
- Height (foundation): 163 m (535 ft)
- Length: 1,210 m (3,970 ft)
- Spillways: 30 (Chute spillway (auxiliary) – 7 : 18.30 m x 18.00 m, Service Spillway – 23 : 18.30 m x 16.75 m)
- Spillway type: Ogee
- Spillway capacity: 86,944 m^{3}/s (3,070,400 cu ft/s)

Reservoir
- Creates: Sardar Sarovar Reservoir
- Total capacity: 9.460 km^{3} (7,669,000 acre⋅ft) (334.12 tmc ft)
- Active capacity: 5.760 km^{3} (4,670,000 acre⋅ft) (203.44 tmc ft)
- Inactive capacity: 3.700 km^{3} (3,000,000 acre⋅ft)
- Catchment area: 88,000 km^{2} (34,000 sq mi)
- Surface area: 375.33 km^{2} (144.92 sq mi)
- Maximum length: 214 km (133 mi)
- Maximum width: 16.10 km (10.00 mi)
- Maximum water depth: 140m
- Normal elevation: 138 m (453 ft)

Power Station
- Operator: Sardar Sarovar Narmada Nigam Limited
- Turbines: Dam: 6 × 200 MW Francis pump-turbine Canal: 5 × 50 MW Kaplan-type
- Installed capacity: 1,450 MW
- Annual generation: Varies from 1 Billion kWh in surplus rainfall year to 0.86 Billion kWh in deficit year.
- Website www.sardarsarovardam.org

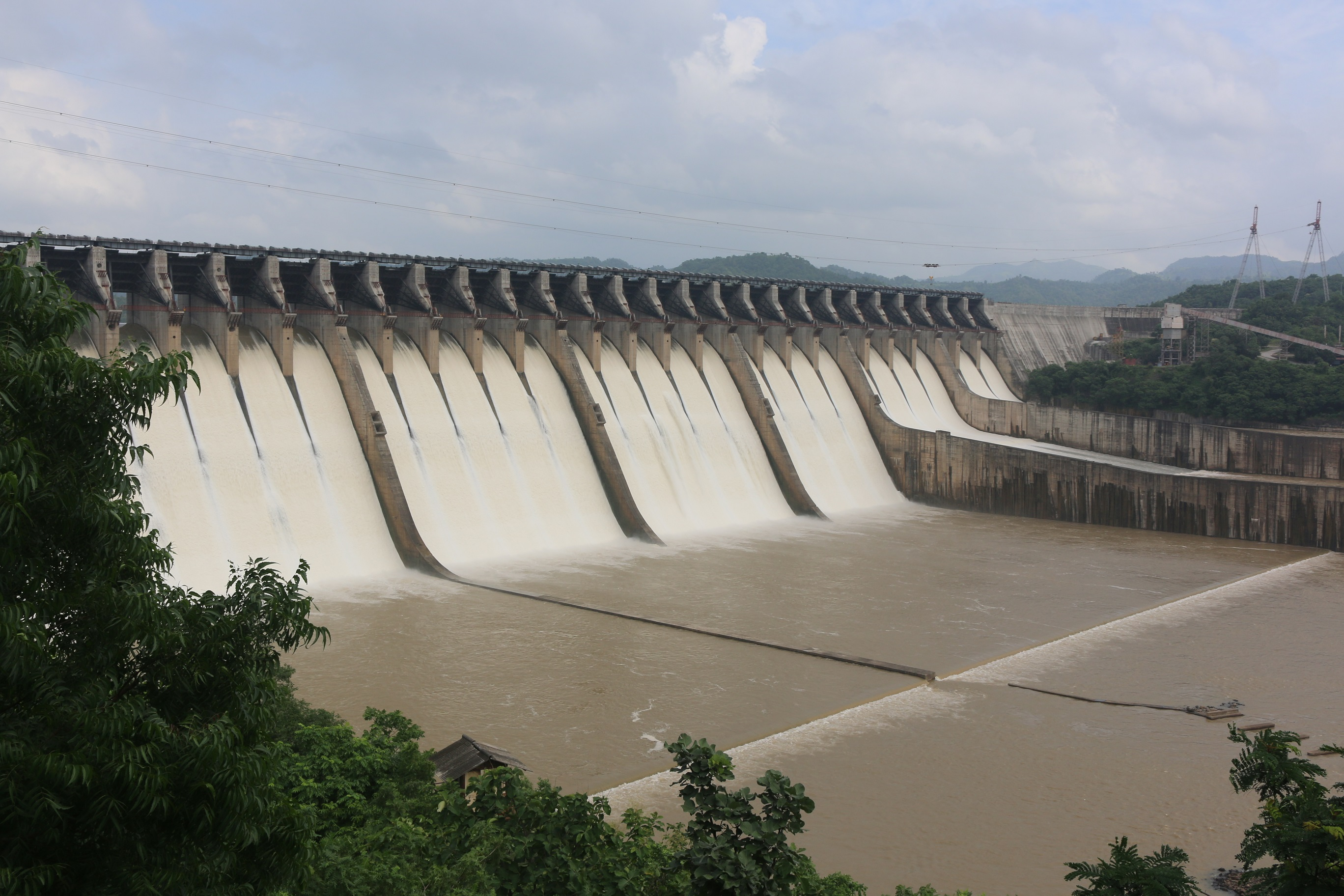
Sardar Sarovar Dam on Narmada River

The Sardar Sarovar Dam is a concrete gravity dam built on the Narmada River near the town of Kevadia, in Narmada District, in the Indian state of Gujarat. The dam was constructed to provide water and electricity to the Indian states of Gujarat, Madhya Pradesh, Maharashtra, and Rajasthan.

India's first Prime Minister, Jawaharlal Nehru, laid the foundation of the project on 5 April 1961. The project took form in 1979 as part of a development scheme funded by the World Bank through their International Bank for Reconstruction and Development, to increase irrigation and produce hydroelectricity, using a loan of US$200 million. The construction of the dam began in 1987, but the project was stalled by the Supreme Court of India in 1995, in the backdrop of Narmada Bachao Andolan, over concerns of displacement of people. In 2000–01, the project was revived but with a lower height of 111 meters under directions from the Supreme Court, which was later increased to 123 meters in 2006, and 139 meters in 2017. The Sardar Sarovar Dam is 1,210 meters long. The dam was inaugurated in 2017 by Prime Minister Narendra Modi. The water level in the Sardar Sarovar Dam eventually reached its highest capacity at 138.7 metres on 15 September 2019.

As one of the 25 dams planned on river Narmada, the Sardar Sarovar Dam is the largest structure to be built. It is the second largest concrete dam in the world in terms of the volume of concrete used in its construction, after the Grand Coulee Dam across the Columbia River, US. It is a part of the Narmada Valley Project, a large hydraulic engineering project involving the construction of a series of large irrigation and hydroelectricity multi-purpose dams on the Narmada River. After a number of cases before the Supreme Court of India (1999, 2000, 2003), by 2014 the Narmada Control Authority had approved a series of changes in the final height and the associated displacement caused by the increased reservoir, from the original 80 m (260 ft) to a final 163 m (535 ft) from foundation. The project will irrigate 1.9 million hectare area, most of it in drought prone areas of Kutch and Saurashtra.

The dam's main power plant houses six 200 megawatts (MW) Francis pump-turbines to generate electricity and include a pumped-storage capability. Additionally, a power plant on the intake for the main canal contains five 50MW Kaplan turbine-generators. The total installed capacity of the power facilities is 1,450 MW. The tallest statue in the world, the Statue of Unity, faces the dam. This statue has been created as a symbol of tribute to Vallabhbhai Patel.

== Geography ==
The dam is located in Gujarat's Narmada district and Kevadia village, on the border of Gujarat and Maharashtra. To the west of the dam, is Madhya Pradesh's Malwa plateau, where the Narmada river dissects the hills tracts and culminates in the Mathwar hills.

The dam is 1,210 meters long and stands 163 meters tall. The Sardar Sarovar reservoir has a gross capacity of 0.95 million hectares meter and live storage capacity of 0.586 million hectares meter (5860 hm³). It occupies an area of 37,000ha with an average length of 214 km and width of 1.7 km. The river catchment area above the dam site is 88,000 square kilometers. It has a spillway discharging capacity of 87,000 cubic meters a second. This dam is one case study to learn about Integrated River Basin Planning, Development and Management.

=== Water management ===
The reservoir operation in the catchment area during the monsoons (from July to October) is well synchronized with the rain forecast. The River Bed Power House (RPBH) is responsible for strategically maximizing the annual allocation of water share. It ensures that minimum water flows downstream, and maximum water is used in the dam overflow period (generally in Monsoons). In non-monsoon months, RPBH takes measures to minimize the conventional and operational losses, avoiding water storage, restricting water-intensive perennial crops, adoption of underground pipelines, proper maintenance of canals, related structures and operation of canals on a rotational basis.

According to Gujarat government estimates, around 9,500 million cubic metres (MCM) of water overflows from the Sardar Sarovar reservoir into the Arabian Sea every year once it fills during the monsoon, with a further 3,000 MCM and 2,200 MCM overflowing from the Ukai and Kadana reservoirs respectively. In October 2026, the state government launched a review of ways to conserve this surplus, including dredging to increase reservoir storage capacity and diverting overflow into other waterbodies, citing projected growth in industrial water demand from sectors such as semiconductors and data centres.

== History ==
This project was envisioned by the first Home Minister of India, Sardar Vallabhbhai Patel. Jawaharlal Nehru laid the foundation stone of this project in 1961. His government carried out a thorough survey to study the usage of the Narmada River, which flows through the states of Madhya Pradesh and Gujarat to the Arabian Sea.

As the river was shared between the three states (Gujarat, Maharashtra and Madhya Pradesh) there were disputes regarding the sharing of water and other important resources. As the negotiations were not successful a report was created, and the Narmada Water Dispute Tribunal (NWDT) was established in 1969. In 1979 the NWDT gave its verdict after assessing all the reports.

== Importance in Gujarat ==
This dam is called 'the lifeline of Gujarat'. Seventy-five percent of Gujarat's command area is considered a drought-prone area, this dam will cater for domestic water supply to the regions of Kutch and Saurashatra. In 2021, for the first time Sardar Sarovar Dam provided waters for irrigation in summers.

=== Narmada Canal ===
The dam irrigates 17,920 km^{2} (6,920 sq mi) of land spread over 12 districts, 62 talukas, and 3,393 villages (75% of which is drought-prone areas) in Gujarat and 730 km^{2} (280 sq mi) in the arid areas of Barmer and Jalore districts of Rajasthan. The dam provides drinking water to 9490 villages and 173 urban centers in Gujarat; and 1336 villages and 3 towns in Rajasthan. The dam also provides flood protection to riverine reaches measuring 30,000 ha (74,000 acres) covering 210 villages and Bharuch city and a population of 400,000 in Gujarat. Saurashtra Narmada Avtaran Irrigation is a major program to help irrigate a lot of regions using the canal's water.The length of canal originating from dam is approximately 75,000 km within Gujarat.

=== Solar power generation ===
In 2011, the government of Gujarat announced plans to generate solar power by placing solar panels over the canal, making it beneficial for the surrounding Villages to get power and also helping to reduce the evaporation of water. The first phase consists of placing panels along a 25 km length of the canal, with a capacity for up to 25 MW of power.

=== Statue of Unity ===
The Government of Gujarat constructed a statue of Sardar Vallabhbhai Patel as a symbol of tribute. The statue stands in front of the dam and is considered as one of the major tourist attractions in the region.

== Rehabilitation ==
=== Resettlement policy and strategy ===
The Narmada Water Dispute Tribunal, setup by Indian government has provided a policy framework under which rehabilitation of affected people has been implemented. The guiding principles of this policy are:

- Improve or at least regain the living standard of the project affected people prior to displacement.
- Should be relocated to villages units or section according to their preference.
- Integration with host community where they have settled.
- Appropriately compensated for adequate social and physical rehabilitation including infrastructure and community services.
- Active participation of affected people in planning of their rehabilitation.

In 2017, a survey was conducted by Swaminathan S. Anklesaria Aiyar and Neeraj Kaushal, the preliminary findings of which were presented in an NBER paper:

We carried out a survey of a randomly selected sample of outsted families (treatment group) and a randomly selected sample of their former neighbors who lived in high areas that would remain above water when the reservoir rises to its maximum height and therefore were allowed to stay (comparison group). We found that, despite implementation glitches, those displaced were far better off than their former forest neighbours in ownership of a range of assets including TVs, cellphones, vehicles, access to schools and hospitals, and agricultural markets. The gap in asset ownership and other outcomes between the treatment and comparison groups were often statistically larger if the heads of the household were illiterate compared to the gap if they were literate. This finding suggests that resettlement helped vulnerable groups more than the less vulnerable and that fears that resettlement will destroy the lives and life-styles of tribals have been grossly exaggerated.

We also found that 54% of displaced folk wished to return to their old habitat, showing that nostalgia for ancestral land can matter more than onwe[r]ship of assets and economic wellbeing. Nearby undisplaced forest dwellers were asked if they would like to be "forcibly" resettled with the full compensation package. Of two forest groups, 31% and 52% said yes. Clearly many, though not all, tribesfolk yearn to leave the forest.

== Activism ==
The dam is one of India's most controversial, and its environmental impact and net costs and benefits are widely debated. The World Bank was initially funding, but withdrew in 1994 at the request of the Government of India when the state governments were unable to comply with the loan's environmental and other requirements. The Narmada Dam has been the center of controversy and protests since the late 1980s.

Artist Orijit Sen graphically portrayed the dispute over the dam in his 1994 graphic novel, River of Stories. Its 2022 reedition includes forwards by Arundhati Roy and Paul Gravett.

One such protest takes center stage in the Spanner Films documentary Drowned Out (2002), which follows one tribal family who decide to stay at home and drown rather than make way for the Narmada Dam. An earlier documentary film is called A Narmada Diary (1995) by Anand Patwardhan and Simantini Dhuru. The efforts of Narmada Bachao Andolan ("Save Narmada Movement") to seek "social and environmental justice" for those most directly affected by the Sardar Sarovar Dam construction feature prominently in this film. It received the (Filmfare Award for Best Documentary-1996).

The figurehead for most part of the protest is Medha Patkar, the leader of the NBA. Patkar's role is questioned in the protest as she is accused of money laundering. Other notable figures who participated in the protest were Baba Amte, Arundhati Roy and Aamir Khan.

== Height increases ==
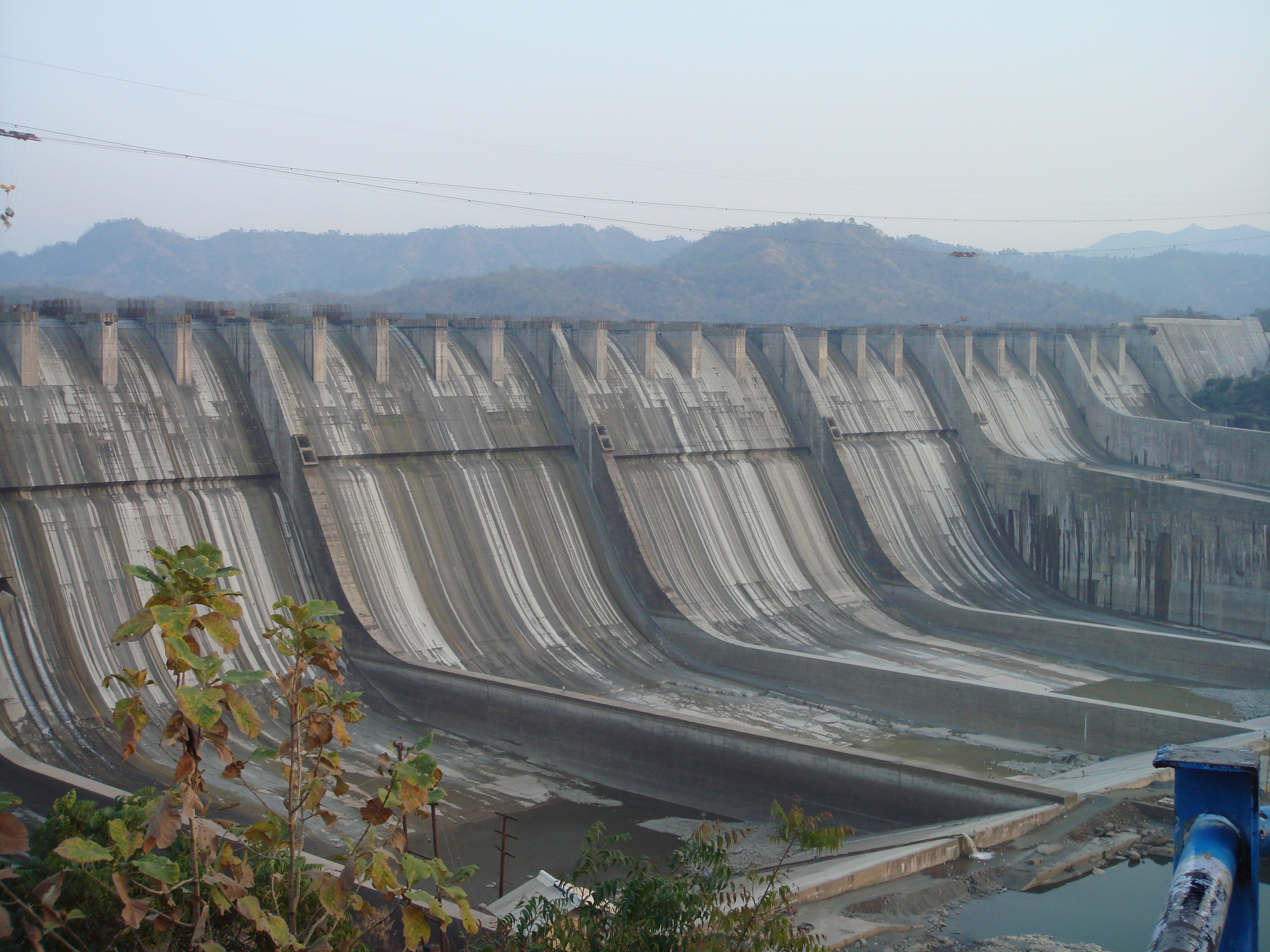
The Sardar Sarovar Dam undergoing height increase in 2006

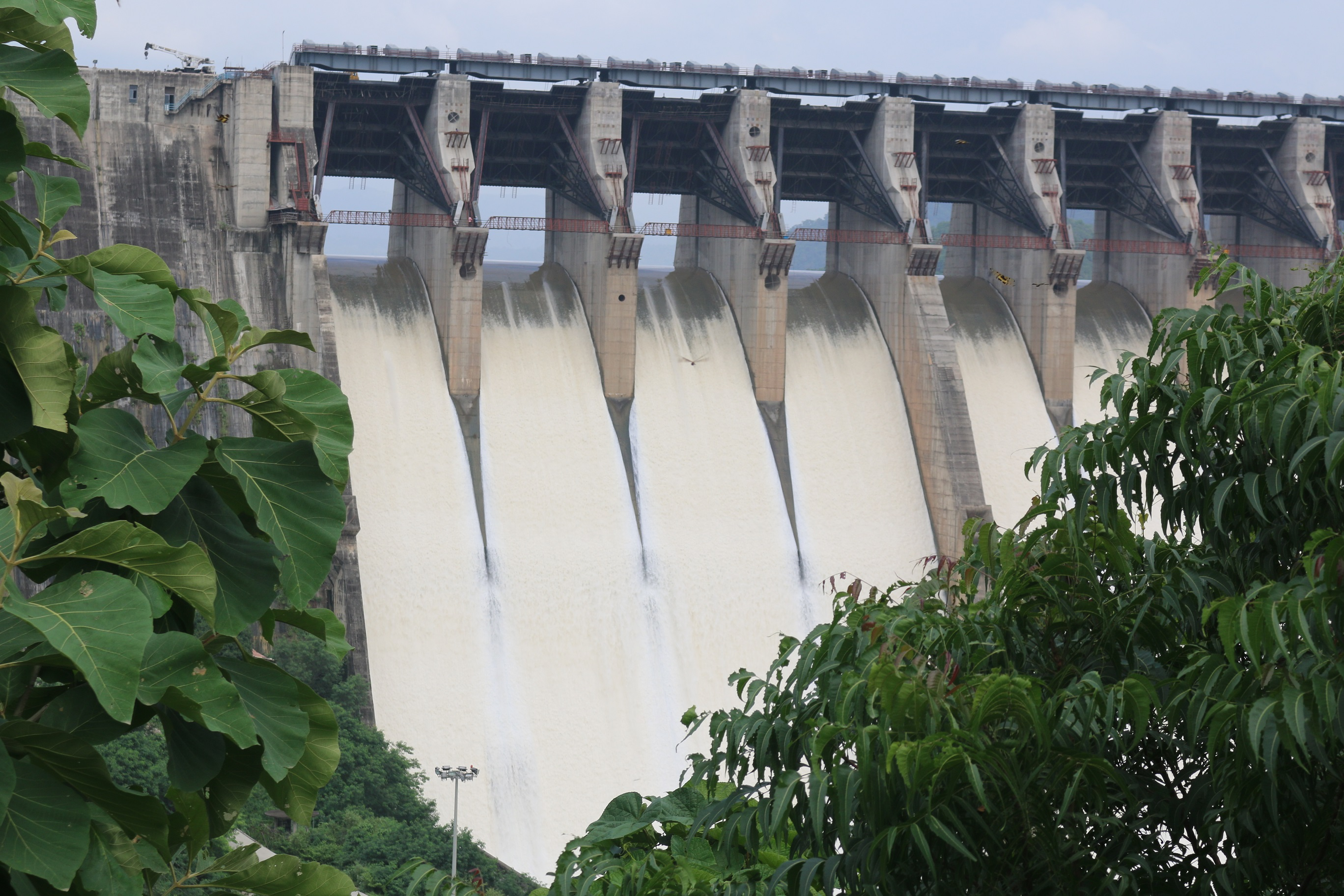
Sardar Sarovar Dam after height increase

- In February 1999, the Supreme Court of India gave the go ahead for the dam's height to be raised to 88 m (289 ft) from the initial 80 m (260 ft).
- In October 2000 again, in a 2-to-1 majority judgment in the Supreme Court, the government was allowed to construct the dam up to 90 m (300 ft).
- In May 2002, the Narmada Control Authority approved increasing the height of the dam to 95 m (312 ft).
- In March 2004, the Authority allowed a 15 m (49 ft) height increase to 110 m (360 ft).
- In March 2006, the Narmada Control Authority gave clearance for the height of the dam to be increased from 110.6 m (363 ft) to 121.9 m (400 ft). This came after 2003 when the Supreme Court of India refused to allow the height of the dam to increase again.
- In August 2013, heavy rains raised the reservoir level to 131.5 m (431 ft), which forced 7,000 villagers upstream along the Narmada River to relocate.
- In June 2014, Narmada Control Authority gave the final clearance to raise the height from 121.9 m (400 ft) metres to 138.6 m (455 ft).
- The Narmada Control Authority decided on 17 June 2017 to raise the height of the Sardar Sarovar Dam to its fullest height 163-metre by ordering the closure of 30 gates.
- The water level in the Sardar Sarovar Dam at Kevadia in Narmada district reached its highest capacity at 138.7 metres on 15 September 2019.
