= National Alliance of People's Movements =

Indian umbrella for activists groups

National Alliance of People's Movements is an alliance of alter-globalisation activist groups in India. It is an umbrella organisation for various civil society organisations and individuals working towards similar goals.

It has led protests on various issues opposing globalization, nuclear energy, and protests supporting electoral reforms.

== History ==
With unequal Economic liberalisation economic liberalisation in India and communal violence like the Babri Masjid demolition, groups opposed to inequality, underdevelopment and sectarian nationalism united to form the National Alliance of People's Movement. One of the founding members was Medha Patkar, of Narmada Bachao Andolan, who later also founded Ghar Bachao Ghar Banao Aandolan in 2004–5.

== Ideology ==
NAPM provides a forum for the coming together of numerous strands of ideologies. NAPM draws from the ideas of Gandhi, Ambedkar, Marx, Lohia, Phule, Periyar and others for its own programs..

== People involved in the movement ==
Leaders involved with the movement include:

1. Medha Patkar
2. Aruna Roy
3. Sandeep Pandey
4. Prafulla Samantra
5. Sunilam
6. Arundhati Dhuru
7. Sunit S.R.
8. Kamayani Swami
9. Vimal Bhai
10. Gabriele Dietrich
11. Madhuresh Kumar
12. Lingaraj Azad
13. Baba Amte
14. Ashish Ranjan
15. Meera Sanghmitra
16. Anand Mazgaongkar
17. Mahendra Yadav
18. Basant Hetamsariya
19. Faisal Khan
20. Kailash Meena
21. Rajkumar Sinha
22. Kusumam Joseph
23. Sister Celia
24. Krishna Kant
25. Sanjay M.G.
26. Rajendra Ravi

== Member Organisations ==
=== Andhra Pradesh ===
1. Andhra Pradesh Vyavsaya Vruthidarula Union
2. Anu Vidyat Kendram Vyatireka Porata Udyamam Pradesh
3. Chattri
4. Human Rights Forum (http://humanrightsforum.org/)
5. Jana Vigyan Vedika (http://jvv-ap.blogspot.in/)
6. Kakrapalli Thermal Vyatireka Porata Committee
7. Paryavarana Parirakshana Vedika
8. Polavaram Project Vyathireka Dalita Bahujana porata Committee
9. Sanjeevani Paryavarana Parirakshana Seva Sangham, Srikakulam
10. Sompeta Paryavarana Parirakshana Samiti

=== Arunachal Pradesh ===
1. Forum for Siang Development

=== Assam ===
1. Krishak Mukti Sangram Samiti

=== Bihar ===
1. Asangathit Kshetra Kaamgar Sangathan
2. Asha Parivar
3. Ashray Abhiyan
4. Ati Pichda Warg Samanvay Samiti
5. Badh Mukhti Abhiyan
6. Badh Per Nagrik Pahar
7. Bandi Adhikar Aandolan
8. Bhagat Singh Kranti Vichar Manch, Patna
9. Bihar Jan Sakti Manch
10. Brajkishore Navnirman Sanstha
11. Building Mazdoor Union
12. Bunkar Sangh
13. Chapra Mahila Baal Sudhaar Samiti
14. Ganga Diara Mukti Andolan
15. Jan Jagran Shakti Sangathan (JJSS)
16. Jhuggi Jhopari Shahari Gareeb Sangharsh Samiti
17. Jhugi Jhopari Sanyukt Sangharash Morcha
18. Khet Bachao Jeevan Bachao Jan Sangarsh Samitee
19. Kisan Sangharsh Morcha
20. Kosi Nav Nirmaan Manch
21. Kosi Vikas Sangharsh Samiti
22. Lok Parishad
23. Loktantra Senani Parishad, Siwan
24. Mahila Adhikar Morcha
25. Manas Kunj Foundation
26. Manav Sanrakshan Samiti, Siwan
27. Manav Joro Manch
28. Mushar Vikas Manch
29. Navjivan Samajik Kendra
30. Nidan, Bihar
31. Pasmanda Muslim Samaj manch
32. Patna Jila Jhuggi Jhopdi Nivasi sangh
33. Prayas Gramin Vikas Samiti (PGVS)
34. Sahaj, Buxar
35. Samajwadi Jan Parishad
36. Sampoorna Kranti Sahayogi Manch
37. Slum Vikas Samiti
38. Soochna Adhikar Abhiyan
39. Times of India, Workers Union
40. Upjao Bhumi Sangharsh Samiti
41. Vanchit Janmorcha
42. Vrihad Sahjan Sewa Samiti

=== Chhattisgarh ===
1. Ardhik Nyay Manch
2. Nadi Ghati Morcha
3. Chhattisgarh Mukti Morcha
4. Chhattisgarh Mahila Manch
5. Chhattisgarh Jan Chetna, Raigarh
6. Raigarh Sangharsh Morcha
7. Nayi Rajdhani Prabhavit Kisan Sangharsh Samiti
8. Rashtriya Rajmarg Prabhavit Kisan – Nagrik Sangharsh Samiti

=== Delhi ===
1. All India Kachhra Shramik Maha Sangh
2. Bhumi Bachao Aandolan, Kanjhawala
3. Delhi Forum
4. Jan Sangharsh Vahini
5. Maharishi Valmiki Atma Jagran Samiti
6. National Cyclist Union
7. National Domestic Workers Union
8. People's Lawyer's Forum
9. Shahri Mahila Kamgar Union

=== Gujarat ===
1. Bhavnagar Jilah Gram Bachao Samiti
2. Gujarat Sarvoday Mandal, Ahmedabad
3. Jyoti Karmachari Mandal, Vadodara
4. Kinara bachao Sangharsh Samiti, Umargaon
5. Manviya Technology Forum, Ahmedabad
6. Narmada Bachao Andolan
7. Paar Poorna Aadivasi Sangathan, Dharampur
8. Paryavaran Suraksha Samiti
9. Rajpipila Social Service Society, Gujarat

=== Haryana ===
1. Beti Bachao Andolan
2. Parmanu Virodhi Morcha
3. Berpjgar Yuva Sangathan
4. Dastak
5. Shaheed Bhagat Singh Disha Manch
6. Haryana Kisan Manch

=== Jharkhand ===
1. Aadivasi Moolwaasi Astitava Raksha Munch
2. Ghatwar Adivasi Mahasabha Jharkhand
3. Jharkhand Alternative Forum
4. Ulgulan Manch, Jharkhand

=== Karnataka ===
1. Chiguru
2. Domestic Workers Union
3. Garment Mahila Karmikara Munnade
4. Garments & Textile Workers Union
5. Indian Social Institute – Bengaluru
6. Karnataka Domestic Workers Union
7. Kranti Kattada Karmikara Sangha
8. Navachetana
9. Nisarga
10. Praja Rajakiya Vedike
11. Preethi Mahilodaya
12. Sama Samaja Vedike
13. Sanchaya Neelya
14. SIGNA
15. Slum Abhivorddi Samiti
16. Slum Jana Andolana
17. Thamate

=== Kerala ===
1. Adivasi Sangarsh Sangham, Palakkad
2. Chalakudy River Protection Forum
3. Coca-Cola Virudha Samara Samiti, Plachimada
4. Endosulfan Virudh Samara Samiti
5. Kerala Swatantra Matsya Thozhilali Federation (KSMTF)
6. Laloor Malinya Virudh Samiti
7. Madya Shala Karma Virudha Samiti, Shathipuram
8. National Highway Protection Forum, Kerala
9. NGIL Virudh Samara Samiti, Kathikulam
10. Salsbeel Green School, Thrissur
11. State H.R. Protection Centre
12. Radical Students Forum (RSF)

=== Madhya Pradesh ===
1. Bargi Bandh Visthapit Sangh
2. Jhuggi Basti Sangharsh Morcha
3. Kisan Sangharsh Samiti, Madhya Pradesh
4. Narmada Bachao Andolan
5. Swasthya Adhikar Manch
6. Yuva Kranti Dal, Sivani

=== Maharashtra ===
1. Apanalaya
2. Bhartiya Swatantra Shetmazdoor Sanghathan
3. Central and Western Catering Association
4. Central Railway Caterer's Association
5. Ekvira jamin Bachao Andolan
6. Ghar Bachao Ghar Banao Andolan
7. Goshikhurd Prakalpgrasth Sangharsh Samiti
8. Loha Prakalp Virodhi Sangharsh Samiti, Korchi, Gadchiroli
9. Nimna Painganga Dharan Virodhi Sangharsha Samiti, Yavatmal
10. Maharashtra Railway Boot Polish Kaamgaar Mahasangh
11. Maharashtra Sarvodya Mandal
12. Man Gaon Bachao Andolan
13. Mose Khore Bachao Andolan, Pune
14. Nagari Hakka Suraksha Samiti, Pimpri – Chinchwad
15. Narmada Bachao Andolan
16. Narmada Navnirman Abhiyan
17. Sahkar Bachav Samiti
18. Sapli Sangharsh Samiti
19. Sarvahara Jan Andolan, Raigad
20. Shahr Vikas Manch, Mumbai
21. Shahri Mahila Kamgar Sangathan
22. Shoshit Jan Andolan
23. Shramik Mukti Sangathana
24. South Central Caterer's Association
25. Tata Dharangrast Sangharsh Samiti
26. Wang Marathwadi Dharangrasth Sangharsh Samiti, Satara
27. Yusuf Mehrally Centre
28. United India Consumer's Association, Mira-Bhayander

=== Orissa ===
1. Darlipali Anchalika Jibika Sangram Samiti
2. Deomali Surakshya Sangram Samiti, Koraput
3. Gandha Mardhan Surakhya Parishad
4. Jala Surakshya Janamancha, Cuttack
5. Kalahandi Mahila Mahasangh
6. Kalahandi Sachetan Nagarik Mancha
7. Khandadhar Banchao Andolan
8. Lokshakti Abhiyan
9. Lower Suktel Budianchal Sangram Parisad
10. Mahaguja Koila Khani Bisthapan Birodhi Manch
11. NarajTata Thermal Power Plant Pratirodh Andolan
12. Niyamgiri Surakhya Samiti
13. Pira Jaharion Bhitamati Surakhya Manch
14. Rairakhol Bhimabhoi Krushak Sangharsa Samiti
15. Rajya Krushak Sangathan
16. Sahara Power Plant Birodhi Manch
17. Sasubohu Mali Surakhya Samiti
18. Sterlite Bisthapan Birodhi Manch
19. Subarnarekha Bisthapita Mukti Bahini
20. Upakula Bhitamati Surakhya Committee
21. Vedanta Viswa Vidyalaya Birodhi Sangharsa Samiti
22. Yusuf Meherally Yuva Biradari

=== Punjab ===
1. Bharat Vikas Parishad, Ludhiana
2. Bhartiya Jan Vigyan Jatha
3. Senior Citizens Pensioners Association, Ludhiana
4. Shaheed Bhagat Singh Youth Federation, Ropar
5. Small Scale Industrialists and Traders Association

=== Rajasthan ===
1. Bhumi Adhigrahan Virdohi Sangarsh Samiti, Jhunjhunu
2. Mazdoor Kisan Shakti Sangathan
3. Navalgarh Kisan Sangarsh Samiti
4. PUCL, Rajasthan
5. Rajasthan Jan Adhikar Manch, Jaipur
6. Rajasthan Samagr Seva Sangh
7. Dalit Adhikar Kendra, Jaipur
8. Jal Jangal Jameen Andolan, Dakhin Rajasthan

=== Tamil Nadu ===
1. Nirman Mazdoor Panchayat Samagam
2. Pennurium Iyakkum
3. TGMMNS, THERVOY
4. Unorganized Sector workers Federation
5. Tamil Nadu Organic Agriculture Movement, Madurai

=== Uttarakhand ===
1. Matu Jan Sangathan

=== Uttar Pradesh ===
1. Acharya Mahabeer Prasad Dewedi Rashtriya Smarak Samiti
2. Asha Parivar
3. Ayodhya Ki Awaz
4. Bhartiya Kisan Majdur Sanyukat Morcha
5. Kaimur Kshetra Mahila Mazdoor Sangharsh Samiti
6. Kisan Manch
7. Kisan Sangharsh Samiti
8. Loksamiti, Varanasi
9. Rajkeeya Ashram Padhyati Samvida Sikshak Sangh U.P.
10. Rashtriya Smarak Samiti, Bareli
11. Sangatin Kisan Mazdoor Sangathan, Sitapur

=== West Bengal ===
1. Aadivasi Jami Raksha Committee, North Bengal
2. Hawkers Sangram Samiti
3. Hindi Urdu Mahila Samity
4. Jan Sanskruti Centre – Theatre of the oppressed
5. Nandigram Struggle Committee
6. Pannu Paribahan Sangram Committee
7. Paschim Bengal Khet Mazdoor Samiti
8. Sara Bangla Truck Parichalak Sangathan Samanvay Samiti
9. Transferred Area Surjapur Organisation – North Bengal

=== Pan India Organisations ===
1. Akhil Bhartiya Khan Pan Licensee Association
2. All India Bank Deposit Collector Federation (UCO Bank Coordination Committee)
3. Indian Railways Caterer Association
4. Khudai Khidmatgaar
5. National Campaign for Unorganised Workers
6. National Fishworkers’ Forum (NFF)
7. National Hawkers Federation
8. National Urban Struggle and Action Committee
9. Rashtra Seva Dal
10. Yuva Bharat

=== Fraternal Organisations at National Level ===
1. All India Forum for Right to Education
2. Azadi Bachao Andolan
3. Bharat Jan Andolan
4. Bharatiya Kisan Union
5. Campaign for Survival and Dignity
6. Ekta Parishad
7. Hind Mazdoor Sabha
8. India Against Corruption
9. Jan Sansad
10. Jan Swasthya Abhiyan
11. Karnataka Rajya Raitha Sangha
12. Lok Rajniti Manch
13. Mines, Minerals and People
14. National Campaign Committee for Rural Workers
15. National Campaign for Right to Information
16. National Forum of Forest People and Forest Workers
17. National Trade Union Initiative
18. National Unorganised Sector Workers Federation
19. Pakistan – India People's Forum for Peace and Democracy
20. Pension Parishad
21. People's Union for Civil Liberties (PUCL)
22. Rashtra Seva Dal
23. Right to Food Campaign
24. Samajwadi Jan Parishad
25. Sangharsh
26. Sarva Seva Sangh
27. Save Sharmila Solidarity Campaign
28. United India Consumer's Association
