= Kalpavriksha (disambiguation) =

Kalpavriksha may refer to:

- Kalpavriksha, a mythological wish granting tree in Indian religions
- Morus (plant), a mulberry tree native to the Indian subcontinent
- Adansonia digitata, the baobab
- Parijaat tree, Kintoor, locally known as Kalpavriksha, a specific baobab tree in Kintoor, India
- Kalpavriksh, an Indian non-governmental organisation
