= Thomas Kocherry =

- Born: 11 May 1940; Changanassery, Travancore (in present-day Kottayam, Kerala, India)
- Died: 3 May 2014 (aged 73); Thiruvananthapuram, Kerala, India
- Occupations: Activist; Priest; Lawyer

Thomas Xavier Kocherry (11 May 1940 – 3 May 2014) was an Indian activist, priest, and lawyer. Known for his efforts in fighting for the cause of India's traditional fishermen, he was called "a senior sage of India's environmental and social justice movements" by the New Internationalist. Kocherry served as chairperson of the National Fishworkers' Forum, the coordinator of the World Forum of Fish Harvesters and Fish Workers and National Alliance of People's Movements (NAMP).

Kocherry was instrumental in mobilizing more than ten million fishermen in South India, and efforts to stop factory fishing and use of mechanized trawls for the purpose. Recognizing his efforts toward the same, Kocherry was given the Earth Trustee award in 1998. In 1999, he received the Sophie Prize, a Norwegian award for environment and sustainable development. He was also a vocal critic of globalization in India.

== Early life ==
Kocherry was born on 11 May 1940 in Changanassery, a town in present-day Kottayam district of the Indian State of Kerala, to Aleyamma and Vavachan Kocherry. He had ten siblings. Kocherry graduated in Science and Law. He earned a bachelor's degree in science from St. Berchmans College, Changanassery, and in law from Government Law College, Thiruvananthapuram.

== Career ==
Kocherry was ordained a priest in April 1971 before he joined the Redemptorist Congregation. He was inspired by its founder Alphonsus Liguori, who left his legal profession to work among poor shepherds in Italy. Kocherry began activism that year in Raiganj, a fishing village, on the Bangladesh–India border. He moved to Poonthura in Thiruvananthapuram from there, to fight for the cause of Kerala's traditional fishermen. In the mid-1970s, during the period of emergency, he founded the Boat Workers' Union in Kerala's coastal town of Anchuthengu before getting involved with the Trivandrum Independent Fish Workers' Union, indicating his role as a trade union leader. He also helped found the Kerala Swatantra Matsyathozhilali Federation.

In 1981, Kocherry undertook an eleven-day fast with his associate Joyachan Antony demanding a ban on mechanized trawling during the monsoon season. Consequently, the Kerala Marine Fishing Regulation Act was enacted with a directive to keep large vessels 22 kilometres (14 mi) off the coastline. In 1982, the National Fishworkers' Forum (NFF) was formed to further these causes, including organizing protests and fighting legal battles against large fleets and polluting industries. He felt, "Trawling is destructive because it disrupts the sea-bed and purse seiners which net shoals of fish are responsible for over- fishing". He added, "Unless the government takes immediate action, we may not have any fish left either to eat or to export." Under Kocherry's leadership, the NFF organized the 'Kanyakumari March' in 1989 against the Kudankulam Nuclear Power Plant; around 25,000 people participated. He served as its chairperson from its formation till 1996.

Kocherry was instrumental in the formation of the National Fisheries Action Committee Against Joint Ventures, with the onset of economic liberalisation in 1991. He felt it led to an increase "fleets and polluting industries along the coasts of developing countries". That year, the Supreme Court ruled a case over the government's joint venture or deep sea fishing policy that envisaged to open India's waters to large commercial vessels, in the NFF's favour. Consequently, in 1996, all coastal infrastructure were asked to be demolished allowing traditional fishing practices to continue. However, the government found a way to circumvent the Court's ruling, and introduced a bill in the mid-1990s. In a statement to the United Nations and world leaders, Kocherry called for a global ban on factory trawlers.

In November 1998, Kocherry became the first Indian to be awarded a Pew Fellowship in Conservation and the Environment, which carried a purse of US$150,000, for his contribution for protecting marine life. However, he rejected the award and said that "a polluter giving an award for marine conservation is a contradiction", considering that Sunoco, which instituted the award, was hitherto an oil exploration company. A few days later, when the Union Ministry of Environment and Forests constituted the National Coastal Zone Management Authority, Kocherry was appointed one of its members for a two-year term.

=== Critic of globalization ===
A vocal critic of globalization, Kocherry called it "the free movement of capital to generate profits for a few at the expense of the vast majority of people". He added, "I took up empowering the victims of globalization as a cause". Kocherry argued that although globalization was accompanied by the rhetoric of decentralization, it centralized the flow of profits and power to the G7 countries. He also remarked that the governments were playing into the hands of pro-foreign domination and pro-investment agencies such as the World Bank, Asian Development Bank, World Trade Organization and the International Monetary Fund, through their policies for free movement of capital, that he felt was contradictory to the principles behind Mahatma Gandhi's Salt March of 1930. Kocherry advocated "political action to establish fisherpeoples' sovereignty over the sea and its wealth" and the "need to think globally and act globally to counter the onslaught from the MNCs and TNCs".

== See also ==
- Fishing in India
- Criticisms of globalization
