= Alok Agarwal =

Indian politician and activist

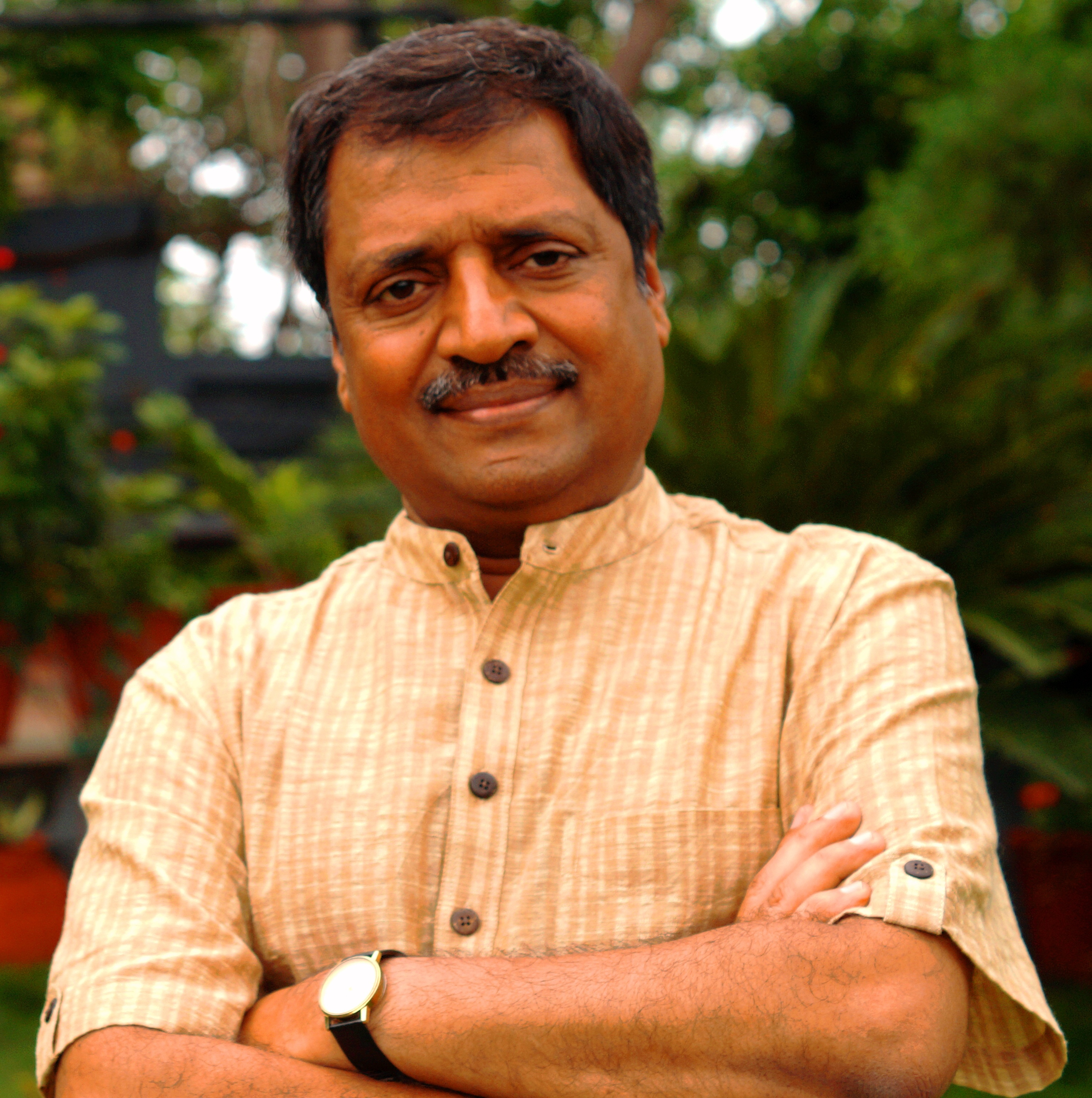
- Born: 25 August 1967 (age 59); Lucknow, Uttar Pradesh, India
- Education: Indian Institute of Technology, Kanpur (BTech)
- Occupation: Social service
- Years active: 1989 - present
- Known for: State-wide agitation for the rights of farmers and Jal Satyagraha in Khandwa district of Madhya Pradesh 2015 Jal Satyagrah
- Notable work: Safeguarding future of oustees of the Narmada Valley Dam Project
- Style: Satyagrah, non-violence, civil disobedience

Alok Agarwal (born 25 August 1967) is an Indian social activist. In 1990, Alok joined the Narmada Bachao Andolan, and for the last three decades, has been a key activist in building up this social movement and struggle of tribals, farmers, environmentalists, and human rights workers against the construction of big dams being built across the Narmada river in Central India and for securing the rights and improved rehabilitation for the millions of farmers and tribals displaced by these dams. He had a brief stint in politics as Aam Aadmi Party's State Head for Madhya Pradesh. He left politics in 2019. At present, he lives in a small tribal village Temacha in Khandwa district, Madhya Pradesh, where he practices organic farming and helps families being displaced by various dams.

== Early life and education ==
Alok Agarwal was born on 25 August 1967. He is the son of a retired government veterinary doctor. Due to his father's transferable posting in the early days, Alok's schooling and upbringing was spread at many different places. In 1989, he received his Bachelor of Technology in Chemical Engineering from Indian Institute of Technology, Kanpur.

== Social work ==
=== Narmada Bachao Andolan ===
In 2012, in response to a 17-day Jal Satyagraha by Alok and his colleagues, the government kept the level of the Omkareshwar Dam to 189 meters.

In September 2013, Alok's team of Narmada Bachao Andolan led another Jal Satyagraha in three districts of Madhya Pradesh – Khandwa, Dewas and Harda, to press their demands of maintaining the height of the Indirasagar to 260 meters. In April 2015, another Jal Satyagraha began in Khandwa district.

Alok Agarwaol has also been an activist against the privatization of water and electricity. In 2003, his Narmada Bachao Andolan team took a lead role in a statewide "Bijli Bachao-Azadi Bachao" movement organized by Jan Sangharsh Morcha (a federation of several social movements of Madhya Pradesh) against the privatization and rise of electricity tariffs. Similarly, the organizations working against the privatization of water have also been receiving active support from Alok. Considering the need for a common front to respond to the multiple kinds of problems faced by the farmers, tribals and workers of the region, Alok's team helped form the "Nimar - Malwa Kisan Mazdoor" organization.

Alok has also led water harvesting projects to ensure the availability of water in the tribal areas. Along with his co-workers Alok Agarwal spent a month in the rehabilitation and relief work after the Gujarat earthquake.

== Political career ==
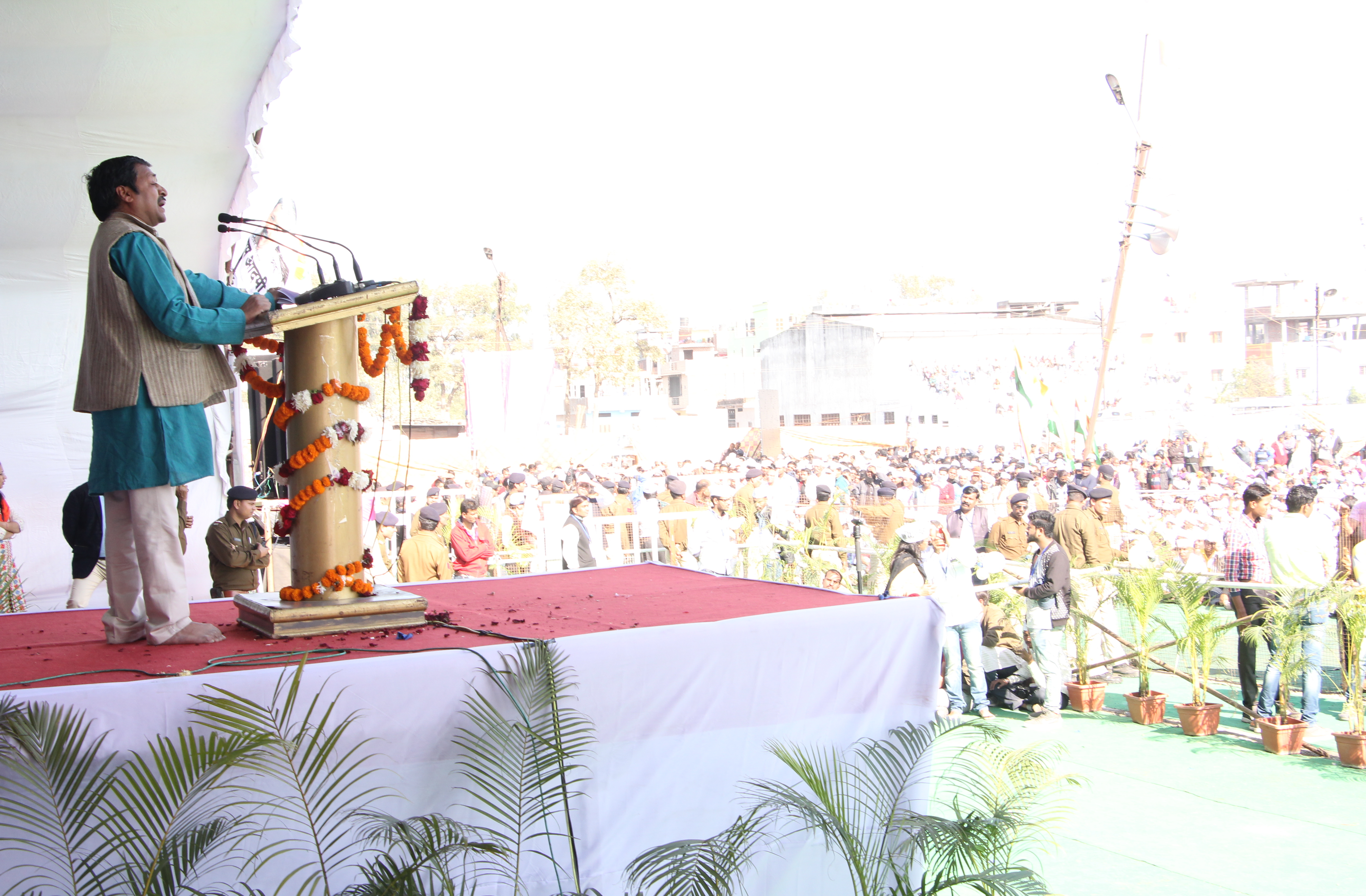
Alok Agarwal during Parivartan rally in Bhopal 20 December 2016

In January 2014, Alok Agarwal joined the Aam Aadmi Party (AAP). In 2014 he contested Loksabha election from Khandwa Loksabha Constituency. During Loksabha elections he was the convener of Aam Aadmi Party Madhya Pradesh Campaign Committee.

On 15 July 2018 Arvind Kejriwal announced Alok Agarwal as Chief Minister face from Aam Aadmi Party for upcoming Vidhansabha Election.

He fought 2018 Madhya Pradesh from elections from Bhopal Dakshin Pashim Assembly Constituency. He left the politics in 2019.
