= Lingaraj Azad =

Indian indigenous tribal activist (born 1962)

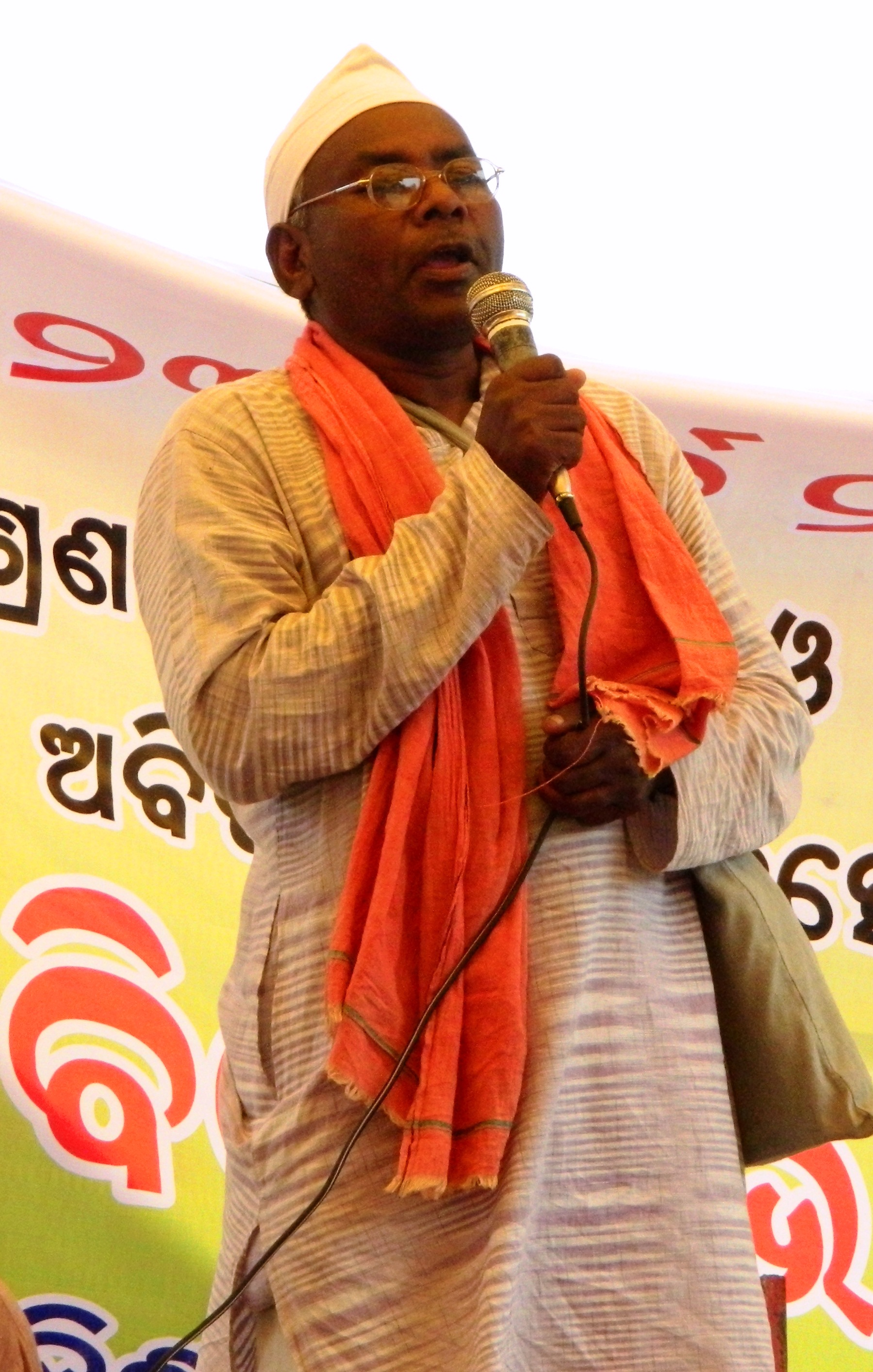
- Lingaraj Azad speaking in a meeting
- Born: 22 June 1962 (age 64); Bhawanipatna, Kalahandi, Orissa, India
- Education: Matriculation (11th class)
- Occupations: Social Service, Tribal and Environmental Activist
- Organization(s): Niyamgiri Surakhya Samiti (NSS), National Alliance of People's Movements (NAPM) Samajwadi Jan Parishad (SWJP)
- Known for: Fight for the environment and tribals of Niyamgiri Mountains, Kalahandi, Kashipur in Orissa
- Political party: Samajwadi Jana Parishad (S.J.P.)
- Movement: Kashipur Movement, Niyamgiri Movement,(Adivasi- Kondha Movement)

Lingaraj Azad, popularly known as Azad Bhai, is a dalit activist from the Indian state of Orissa. He became notable for his activism in opposing Vedanta Resources's bauxite refinery in Lanjigarh and mining of Niyamgiri Hills that tribals say would displace thirty villages of Dongria Kondhs (the "Mountain Tribals") on top of the mountains.

== Early life ==
Lingaraj Azad was born into a Dalit family in Orissa, a state in eastern India. Dalits are a diverse group of Scheduled Caste community in Orissa. Among dalits, his family more specifically belongs to the Ganda caste.

== Activism ==
Western Orissa is rich in natural resources and many government and private companies have appropriated land to build number of natural resources extracting factories. Due to lack of official documentation of the Tribals and repressed class people's community rights over the forests, mountains, rivers and land they have been unable to claim their rights on community properties.

Anil Agarwal set up one of the world's largest aluminum smelting plants in the area, with a bauxite refinery at Lanjigarh at the foothills of the Niyamgiri Mountains. Azad and his organization Niyamgiri Suraksha Samiti (Association for the Safeguard of Niyamgiri Hills) - says apart from causing massive displacement, the project will destroy the forests in the area. It will also affect the water sources and ecosystems, thereby threatening the environment and the very source of sustenance for indigenous peoples, it says

We will not give an inch of our mountain.

. Anil Aggarwal's Vedanta on its part says that it does not want to grab local peoples land and is willing to negotiate with all stake holders. Azad counters that the subsistence tribal communities would receive will not survive the alienation from their native land and they cannot be compensated for such a loss.

He has been jailed multiple times for his active involvement in the environmental movement.

He participated in the yatra (Sanskrit for journey, used in the context of Indian politics to mean an "awareness campaign") conducted by the NAPM from Mumbai to Delhi against proposed mega-industrial corridor in 2013.

== See also ==
- Kondha Tribals of Niyamgiri
