= Andhra Pradesh Vyavsaya Vruthidarula Union =

The Andhra Pradesh Vyavsaya Vruthidarula Union (APVVU) is a state level trade union federation in the state of Andhra Pradesh in India. The APVVU comprises 448 mandal (block) level trade unions of agricultural workers, marginal farmers, fisher folk, indigenous people, shepherds and rural artisans. The APVVU is part of the National Alliance of People's Movements and the Progressive International.

== History ==
The APVVU started in 1991 from three districts: Ranga Reddy, Chittoor and Mahbub Nagar. It became a full-fledged federation at the state level in 1998. It was the first registered state-level federation in AP under the Trade Union Act, 1926.

In 2009, the APVVU organised a 120 km padyatra to Chodavaram seeking work for eligible families under the National Rural Employment Guarantee Scheme. In 2013, APVVU state secretary, J. Bapuji was arrested while leading a campaign for implementation of the Forest Rights Act in Jillellagudem, West Godavari District.

== Composition and Organisational Structure ==
In 2014, the APVVU had 577,850 members, of which 56% were women. 92% of its members are Dalits or Adivasis.

Every village elects a nit leader to the mandal level union. The mandal union is headed by a secretary. Two members, a man and a woman, from the mandal level are elected to the district committees. The state working committee consists of the district secretaries. Five elected state secretaries represent each of the workers' sectors. A secretary for national coordination is nominated from the general body.
