= Narmada Bachao Andolan =

Environmental initiative to save river Narmada

Narmada Bachao Andolan logo. It reads, नर्मदा बचाओ, 'Save the Narmada River!'

Narmada Bachao Andolan (NBA, Hindi: नर्मदा बचाओ आंदोलन, 'Save the Narmada River Movement') is an Indian social movement founded by Medha Patkar in 1985, organizing native tribes (adivasis), farmers, environmentalists and human rights activists against a number of large dam projects across the Narmada River, which drains into the Arabian Sea, after flowing through the states of Gujarat, Madhya Pradesh, and Maharashtra. The Sardar Sarovar Dam in Gujarat is one of the biggest dams on the river, and was one of the first focal points of the movement. It is part of the Narmada Dam Project, whose main aim is to provide irrigation and electricity to people of the above states.

The mode of campaign under NBA includes court actions, hunger strikes, rallies, and gathering support from notable film and art personalities. The NBA, with its leading spokespersons Medha Patkar and Baba Amte, received the Right Livelihood Award in 1991.

== History ==
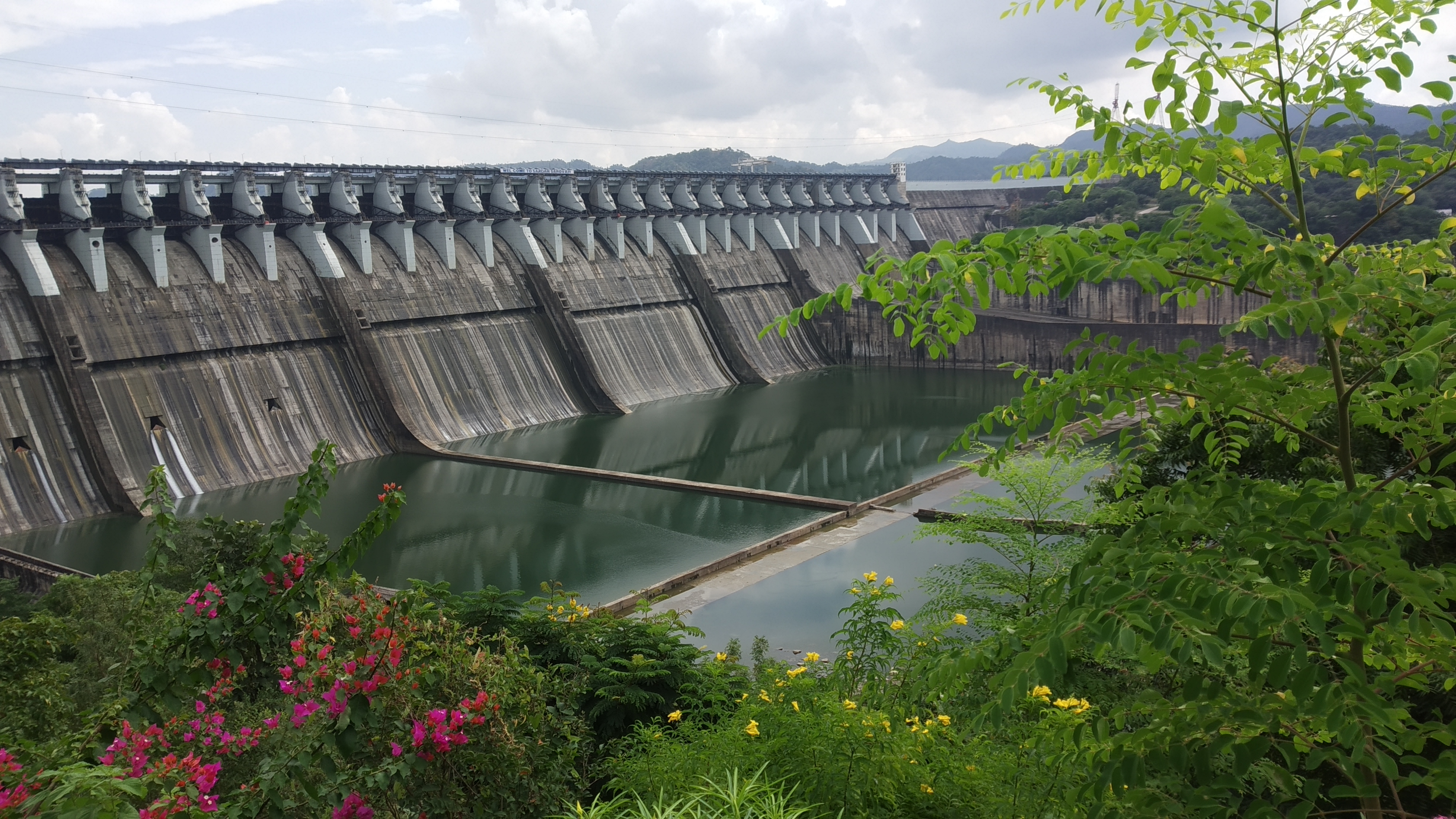
Sardar Sarovar Dam

After India's independence in 1947, under the newly formed government headed by Jawaharlal Nehru, investigations were carried out to evaluate mechanisms for using water from the Narmada River, which flows into the Arabian Sea after passing through the states of Madhya Pradesh, Gujarat. The formation of the Narmada Water Disputes Tribunal was triggered by interstate differences in implementing schemes and sharing of water by the Government of India on 6 October 1969 to adjudicate over the disputes. The tribunal investigated the matters referred to it, and responded after more than 10 years. The Narmada Tribunal aimed to set out conditions regarding the resettlement and rehabilitation of those displaced by the dams. On 12 December 1979, after ten years of investigation, the decision as given by the tribunal, with all the parties at dispute binding to it, was released by the Indian government.

As per the tribunal's decision, 30 major, 135 medium, and 3000 small dams were approved for construction, including raising the height of the Sardar Sarovar dam. This decision was motivated by the assumption that it would provide water to around forty million people, irrigation, and electricity to people in the region. Thus, the construction began.

In 1985, after hearing about the Sardar Sarovar Dam, Medha Patkar and her colleagues visited the project site and noticed that project work was being checked due to an order by the Ministry of Environment and Forests, Government of India. The reasons for this was cited as "non-fulfillment of basic environmental conditions and the lack of completion of crucial studies and plans". The people who were going to be affected by the construction of the dam were given no information but the offer for rehabilitation. Villagers weren't consulted and weren't asked for a feedback on the assessment that had taken place. Furthermore, the officials related to the project had not even checked the land records and updated them. While World Bank, the financing agency for this project, came into the picture, Patkar approached the Ministry of Environment to seek clarifications. After seeking answers from the ministry, she realized that the project was not sanctioned at all and wondered as to how funds were even sanctioned by the World Bank. After several studies, they realized that the officials had overlooked the post-project problems.

Through Patkar's channel of communication between the government and the residents, she provided critiques to the project authorities and the governments involved. At the same time, her group realized that all those displaced were given compensation only for the immediate standing crop and not for displacement and rehabilitation.

As Patkar remained immersed in the Narmada struggle, she chose to quit her PhD studies to focus entirely on the Narmada activity. Thereafter, she organized a 36-day solidarity march among the neighboring states of the Narmada valley from Madhya Pradesh to the Sardar Sarovar dam site. She said that the march was "a path symbolizing the long path of struggle (both immediate and long-term) that [they] really had". The march was resisted by the police, who according to Patkar were "caning the marchers and arresting them and tearing the clothes off women activists".

Within the focus of the NBA towards the stoppage of the Sardar Sarovar Dam, Patkar advised adding the World Bank to its propaganda. Using the right to fasting, she undertook a 22-day fast that almost took her life. Patkar's actions did force the World Bank to set up The Morse Commission, an independent review of the project. Their report clearly stated that the Bank's policies on environment and resettlement were being violated by the project. The World Bank's participation in these projects was canceled in 1993. Before the World Bank could pull out, the Indian Government did.

She undertook a similar fast in 1993 and resisted evacuation from the dam site. In 1994, the Narmada Bachao Andolan office was attacked reportedly by a couple of political parties, and Patkar and other activists were physically assaulted and verbally abused. In protest, a few NBA activists and she began a fast; 20 days later, they were arrested and forcibly fed intravenously.

The Sardar Sarovar Dam's construction began again in 1999 after the construction was allowed and was declared finished in 2006. It was inaugurated in 2017 by Prime Minister Narendra Damodardas Modi. Since construction in 2017, the height has been increased from 138 meters to 163 meters.

== Formation ==
There were many groups such as Gujarat-based Narmada Asargrastha Samiti, Madhya Pradesh-based Narmada Ghati Nav Nirman Samiti (Committee for a New Life in the Narmada Valley) and Maharashtra-Based Narmada Dharangrastha Samiti (Committee for Narmada Dam-Affected People) who either believed in the need for fair rehabilitation plans for the people or who vehemently opposed dam construction despite a resettlement policy.

Narmada Bachao Andolan was also joined by several NGOs with local people, professionals, and activists as the founders with a non-violent approach. It was led by Medha Patkar. Nationally, they wanted an alternative structure of development and internationally, they wanted to build pressure on the World Bank to take accountability.

NBA's slogans include - Vikas Chahiye, Vinash Nahin! (Development wanted, not destruction) and "koi nahi hatega, bandh nahi banega!" (we won't move, the dam won't be constructed).

== Role of the World Bank ==
The World Bank began working on the Narmada Project after it got clearance from the Narmada Water Disputes Tribunal. The bank sent a team for the assessment of the project in economic and technical terms. This team didn't focus on the social or environmental issues. What Jawaharlal Nehru thought of as temples of the independent India, i.e. the dams, have already displaced 11 million Indians.

However, the Bank realised the harm that it had done by sanctioning the loan for the project and thus announced that the new projects should "ensure that, after a reasonable transition period, the displaced people regain at least their previous standard of living." Despite this, the relocation process was flawed. Several tribal people have been harmed by the project. The Bank then adopted certain policies to ensure proper relocation of the tribal people and protect them from the forced relocation. The Indian government, however, did not adopt these policies.

In 1985, irrespective of the harm done by the Sardar Sarovar project, the World bank sanctioned a loan to the state governments for construction purposes. The Bank did ask for a proper resettlement design but also said, "The argument in favour of the Sardar Sarovar Project is that the benefits are so large that they substantially outweigh the costs of the immediate human and environmental disruption."

Medha Patkar and other protesters testified on the Bank's role in Washington, D.C., in 1989. This led to a build-up of pressure on the Bank to set an independent review to assess the situation at hand. A lot of support was withdrawn from the project after this.

The Morse Commission was established to look into the construction of the dam, and the environmental cost and human displacement in 1991. For the first time, a Bank commissioned panel had complete access to the documents to form a report. The 357 pages' report mentioned the lack of any environmental assessment undertaken either by the Indian Government or the World Bank. In an internal referendum held, the Bank very closely voted for the continuation of the Narmada Dam Project.

The Indian Government canceled the loan sanctioned by the World Bank on 31 March 1993.

== People involved ==
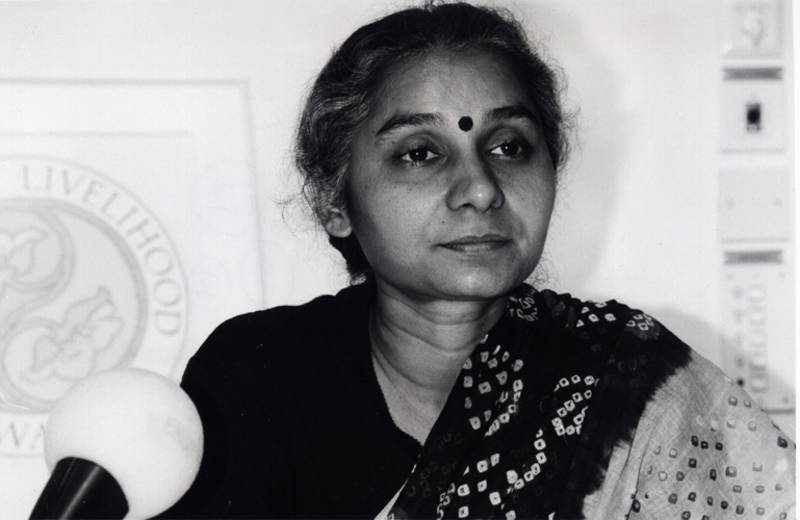
Medha Patkar

Medha Patkar has been at the forefront of the movement. She has organised several fasts and satyagrahas, and been to jail several times for the cause.

Another popular figure was Baba Amte, known for his work against leprosy. He published a booklet called Cry O Beloved Narmada in 1989 to protest against the construction of the dam.

Orijit Sen also raised attention for the cause by creating what may be India's first graphic novel, River of Stories, published in 1994 and 2022.

Amongst the major celebrities who have shown their support for Narmada Bachao Andolan are Booker Prize winner Arundhati Roy and Aamir Khan. It was also supported by music composer and bass guitarist in the band Indian Ocean, Rahul Ram, who was actively involved in the movement from 1990 to 1995.

In 1994 was the launch of Narmada: A Valley Rises, by filmmaker Ali Kazimi. It documents the five-week Sangharsh Yatra of 1991. The film went on to win several awards and is considered by many to be a classic on the issue. In 1996, veteran documentary filmmaker, Anand Patwardhan, made an award-winning documentary: A Narmada Diary. Alok Agarwal, current member of the Aam Aadmi Party, is an active figure in the movement.

Bihar CM Nitish Kumar participated in rally organised by NBA on the bank of Narmada at Rajghat on 16 September 2016. Expressing solidarity with the Andolan Mr. Nitish Kumar said "I have come from Patna to extend support to the agitation on the side of river Narmada here".

Supporting the NBA's main demand CM Nitish Kumar appealed to PM Mr Modi at Rajghat saying "Pradhan Mantri ji, don't close the gates of Sardar Sarovar Dam. Rehabilitate people not by giving cash, but giving them alternative land/employment. Don't make plans to drown 2.5 lakh people by closing the gates," he said in a statement released in Barwani.

== Decision ==
The court ruled for Andolan, effecting an immediate stoppage of work at the dam and directing the concerned states to complete the rehabilitation and replacement process.

It deliberated on this issue further for several years and finally upheld the Tribunal Award and allowed the construction to proceed, subject to conditions. The court introduced a mechanism to monitor the progress of resettlement pari passu with the raising height of the dam through the Grievance Redressal Authorities (GRA) in each party state. The decision referred in this document, given in 2000 after 7 years of deliberations, has paved the way for completing the project to attain full envisaged benefits. The court's final line of the order states, "Every endeavour shall be made to see that the project is completed as expeditiously as possible".

Subsequent to the verdict, Press Information Bureau (PIB) featured an article:

The Narmada Bachao Andolaan (NBA) has rendered a yeoman's service to the country by creating a high-level of awareness about the environmental and rehabilitation and relief aspects of Sardar Sarovar and other projects on the Narmada. But, after the court verdict it is incumbent on it to adopt a new role. Instead of 'damning the dam' any longer, it could assume the role of vigilant observer to see that the resettlement work is as humane and painless as possible and that the environmental aspects are taken due care of.

== Aftermath and criticism ==
Medha Patkar continues to fight for proper rehabilitation of the displaced people in Madhya Pradesh as well as the reception of the promised compensation by the Narmada Tribunal. This movement has brought forth different notions of development. The Indian government has often argued that the cost of displacements are outweighed by the benefit derived from the Narmada Project, and thus, justified its construction. NBA, however, has argued that no matter how large the benefits, the cost to the society cannot be fulfilled.

Critics argue that the dam's benefits include the provision of drinking water, power generation, and irrigation facilities. However, it is believed that the campaign, led by the NBA activists, has held up the project's completion, and NBA supporters have attacked local people who accepted compensation for moving. Others have argued that the Narmada Dam protesters are little more than environmental extremists, who use pseudoscientific agitprop to scuttle the development of the region and that the dam will provide agricultural benefits to millions of poor in India. There had also been instances of the NBA activists turning violent and attacking rehabilitation officer from Narmada Valley Development Authority (NVDA), which caused damage to the contractor's machinery.

The NBA has been accused of lying under oath in court about land ownership in areas affected by the dam. The Supreme Court has mulled perjury charges against the group. The Supreme Court directed that "in the future, should any petition or case be filed in court by the 'Narmada Bachao Andolan', it must be handled with extreme care and caution." It was further clarified that any statement or remark made by the organization must be submitted accompanied by an affidavit from a responsible person within the organization.
