= River of Stories =

Graphic novel

- Cover of the 25th Anniversary Edition

Publication information
- Publisher: Kalpavriksh (India); 25th Anniversary Edition, Blaft Publications (India)
- Publication date: 1994

Creative team
- Written by: Orijit Sen
- Artist: Orijit Sen

River of Stories is a graphic novel written and illustrated by Indian artist Orijit Sen. Often considered India's first graphic novel, it tells the story of the environmental, social and political issues surrounding the construction of the controversial Narmada Dam. It was published in 1994 with the help of a small grant from Kalpavriksh, an NGO.

It fell out of print in 1996, but was republished in a new edition by Blaft Publications in 2022 with a foreword by Arundhati Roy.

== Author ==
Orijit studied graphic design at the National Institute of Design (NID). River of Stories was one of his earliest works. He subsequently went on to do many shorter comics for magazines like Chimurenga. He is one of the co-founders of People Tree, a collaborative studio and store for artists, designers and craftspeople based in Delhi and Goa. He is also a co-founder of the Pao Collective of graphic artists and chief editor of 'Comixense'—a comics quarterly for young readers. His artwork has been exhibited in India, the United Kingdom, and Russia.

== Characters ==
- Vishnu
- Kujum Chantu
- Relku
- Anand
- Malgu Gayan

== See also ==
- Indian comics
