= Liao Xiaoyi =

Chinese environmental activist and journalist

- Born: 1954 (age 71–72); Chongqing, China
- Occupations: Activist, journalist
- Writing career
- Pen name: Sheri Liao
- Subjects: Lifestyle, philosophy

Liao Xiaoyi (simplified Chinese: 廖晓义; traditional Chinese: 廖曉義; pinyin: Liào Xiǎoyì; Wade–Giles: Liao Hsiao-I), or Sheri Liao, is a Chinese environmental activist, journalist and producer of documentaries whose works are credited with advancing the Chinese environmental movement.

== Life and work ==
After graduating from Sun Yat-sen University in 1986, Liao taught philosophy as a researcher at the Chinese Academy of Social Sciences, where she first gained an interest in environmental philosophy. She began to read environmentalist works and film documentaries on China's ecological plight that appeared on China Central Television. She then served as a visiting scholar at the University of North Carolina, where she claims to have first discovered the role that civil society can play in environmentalism. She returned to China in 1996 and founded the non-government organization Global Village of Beijing.

Her idea is to promote "a life of harmony" through reduced consumption and decreased use of harmful practices in daily lives. She served as an environmental adviser on the Beijing Organizing Committee for the 2008 Olympic Games. Through her role as president of Global Village of Beijing, she has produced models for green neighborhood complexes, rural communities, and organized many public awareness campaigns regarding pollution, recycling and reducing consumption.

=== Awards and honors ===
- 2009: Featured as "Hero of the Environment" by TIME magazine, USA
- 2008: the Third Annual Happy "Town Provisions" Person of the Year by CCTV
- 2008: Most influential Charity Project Award by Ministry of Civil Affairs
- 2008: the 30 Years of Reform and Opening Up award by People's Daily
- 2008: Individual Contribution Award issued by National Commission for Development and Reform
- 2008: Global Citizen Award by Clinton Global Initiative, USA
- 2007: Ecological person of the year award by a joint committee of six Ministries led by Ministry of Agriculture
- 2006: Green Person of the year award for environmental achievement by Joint committee of seven Ministries led by Ministry of Environment
- 2005: Person of the year award for economic public charity. CCTV
- 2002: Ten Outstanding Women in China by the magazine Chinese Women
- 2001: Banksias Award, Australia
- 2000: Sophie Prize, Norway

== See also ==
- Environmentalism
- Global Village of Beijing
- Women and the environment through history
