= Sophie Prize =

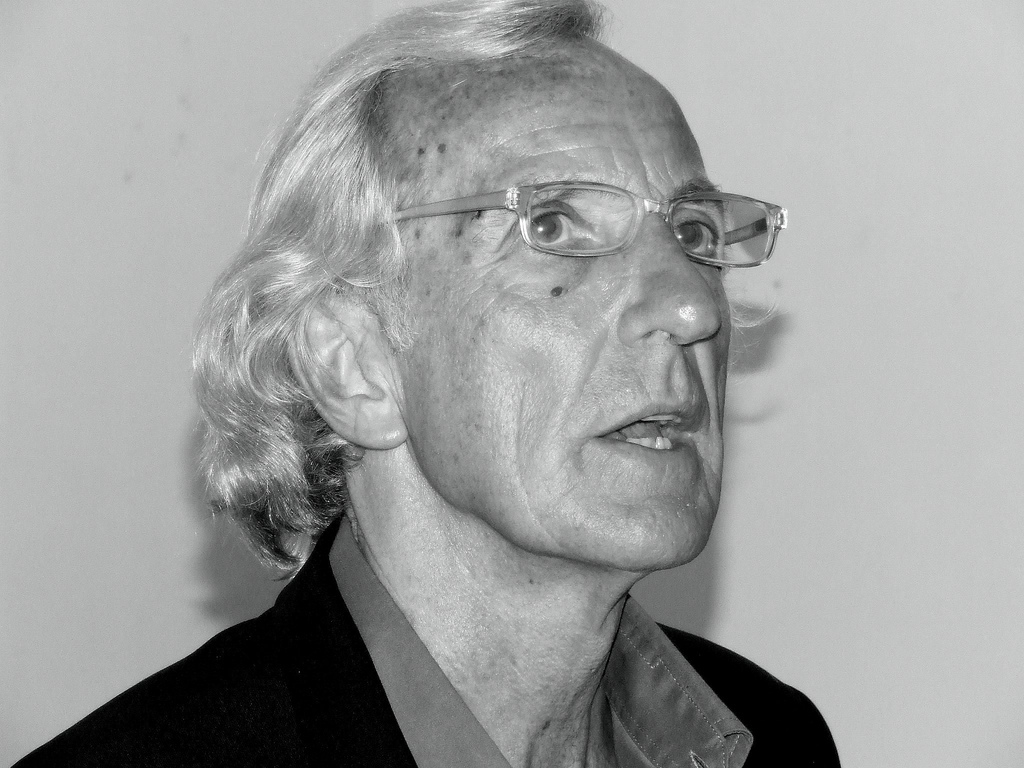
John Pilger

The Sophie Prize was an international environment and development prize (USD 100,000) awarded annually from 1998 to 2013. It was established in 1997 by the Norwegian author Jostein Gaarder and his wife Siri Dannevig, and is named after Gaarder's novel Sophie's World. It aimed to recognize individuals or organizations working with the environment and sustainable development. In 2013, representatives announced that the prize would not be awarded any longer due to a lack of funds.

== Prize winners ==
- 1998: Environmental Rights Action, Nigeria
- 1999: Herman Daly and Thomas Kocherry
- 2000: Sheri Liao
- 2001: ATTAC France
- 2002: Patriarch Bartholomew I
- 2003: John Pilger
- 2004: Wangari Maathai
- 2005: Sheila Watt-Cloutier
- 2006: Romina Picolotti
- 2007: Göran Persson
- 2008: Gretchen Daily
- 2009: Marina Silva, Brazil
- 2010: James Hansen
- 2011: Tristram Stuart
- 2012: Eva Joly
- 2013: Bill McKibben

== Board members ==
- Åslaug Haga (chair)
- Petter Nome (deputy chair)
- Helene Bank
- Siri Dannevig
- Nikolas Dannevig Gaarder
- Elin Enge
- Thomas Hylland Eriksen
- Jostein Gaarder
- Elizabeth Hartmann
- Dag Olav Hessen
- Bård Lahn
- Ylva Lindberg
- Sidsel Mørck

== See also ==
- List of environmental awards
