= Saurashtra Narmada Avtaran Irrigation =

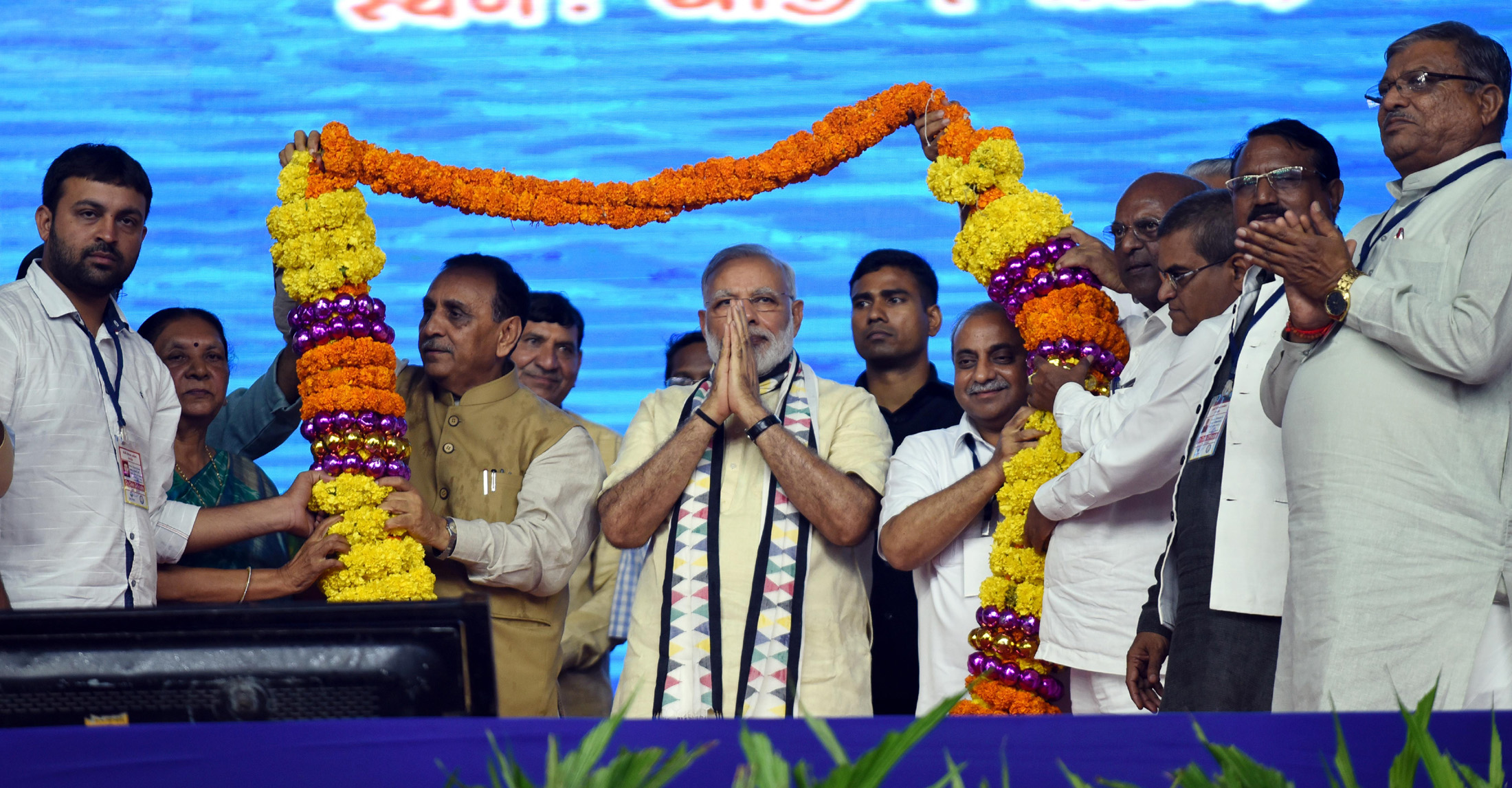
The Prime Minister, Narendra Modi at ceremony to inaugurate Aji-3 Dam under Phase-I of Saurashtra Narmada Avtaran Irrigation (SAUNI) Yojana, in Rajkot, Gujarat

Saurashtra Narmada Avtaran Irrigation (SAUNI) is a project launched by Indian Prime Minister Narendra Modi with objective of filling 115 major dams by diverting floodwaters overflowing from the Sardar Sarovar Dam across the Narmada river to the drought areas in Saurashtra region of Gujarat state of India.

== Objective ==
The project acts as a 'linking' project where the water will be filled in irrigation dams that are already equipped with canal network. The key features include:

- 115 dams in the Saurashtra region will be filled with excess water
- around 10 dams and reservoirs of Rajkot, Jamnagar and Morbi districts will be filled with water
- making pipe canals instead of the conventional open canals
- 1125-km network of pipelines that will help to channel water into farms.

== Background ==
The Saurashtra (region) of Gujarat which includes 11 districts that face drought-like situations often and has been reeling under severe water scarcity due to scanty rainfall. Sardar Sarovar Dam has 4.75 million acre-feet (5.86 km^{3}) storage capacity which is further distributed to states of Gujarat, Rajasthan and Maharashtra. A lot of floodwaters still overflow the dam especially in the monsoon season and end up going to the sea route. Gujarat's share is around 3 million acre-feet (3.7 km^{3}) MAFT in that floodwater. With the new scheme, the water will be distributed to all the big reservoirs.

== Objectives ==
It acts as a link project and aims to fill irrigation dams which includes canal networks to channelise water to the farmland. It will also have pipe canals instead of open canals and this makes the project unique because pipelines will be underground under private land while pumping stations will be built on government land. The project also has a potential to create about 8,800 jobs each year.

== Estimations ==
The government has been making budgetary allocations for the project for the past three years, has set aside ₹1,500 crore (US$160 million) for 2016–17, and taken a ₹2,112 crore (US$220 million) loan from NABARD in name of Gujarat Government for irrigation projects. The project is estimated to allow irrigation over an area of around 59,000 hectares with the pumping motors that may consume 84,000 kVA at full load. RIDF fund of ₹860.09 crore (US$89 million) has been allocated till 2016 for construction of pumping stations, managing valves and putting pipelines.

== Criticism ==
According to some officials, the costs involved in managing the pumping of water through electric motors will make it an expensive project against other projects with open canals though it saves the overhead of the government to acquire land for making of canals.
