= Orijit Sen =

Indian graphic artist (born 1963)

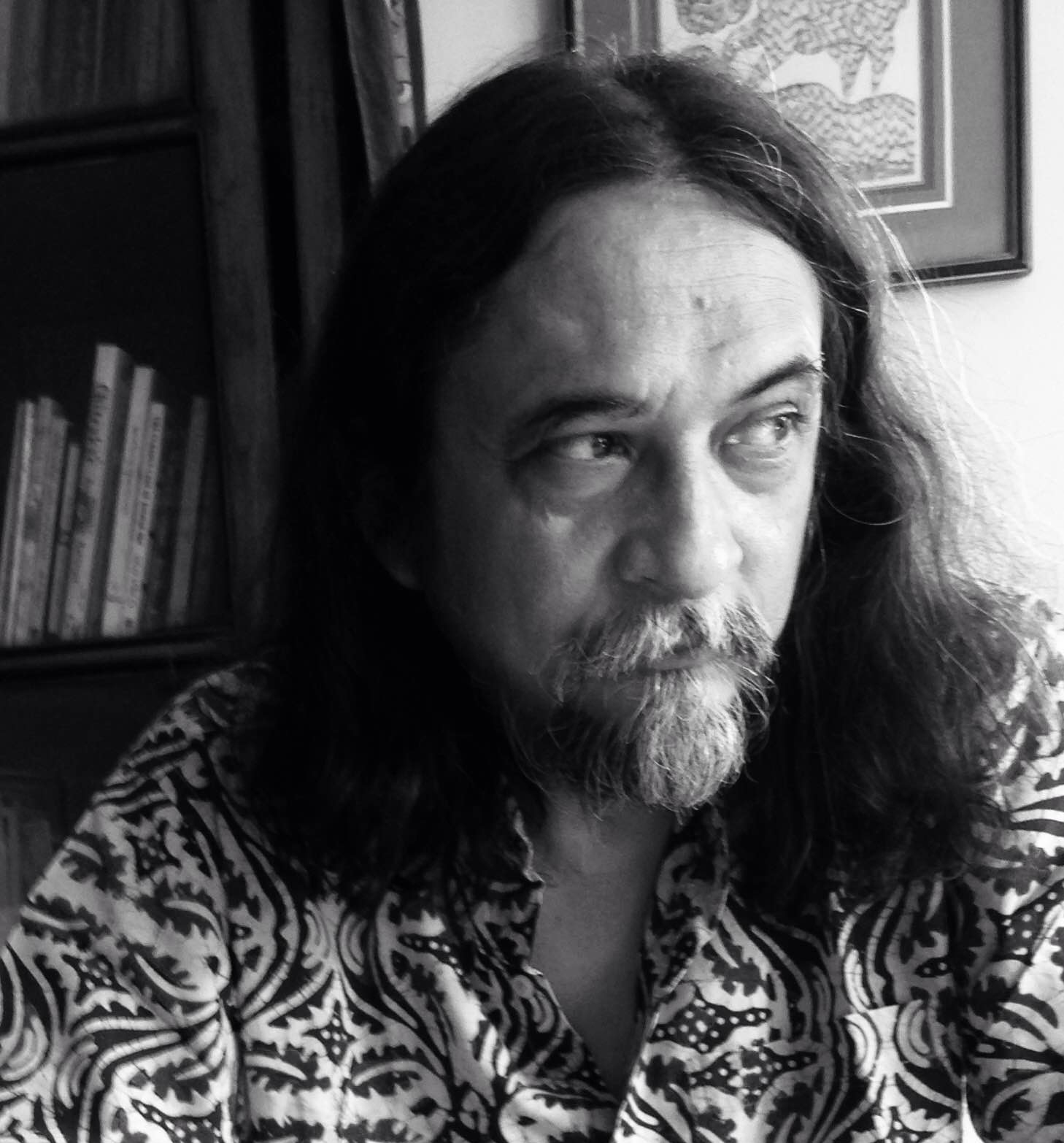
- Sen in 2015
- Born: 1963 (age 62–63)
- Occupations: Graphic artist, designer, professor
- Notable work: River of Stories

Orijit Sen (born 1963) is an Indian graphic artist and designer. His graphic novel River of Stories, published in 1994 by Kalpavriksh, is considered as the first graphic novel of India. He co-founded People Tree in 1990 as a "collaborative studio and store for artists, designers, and craftspeople." He is one of the founders of "The Pao Collective" of comic book artists. He is Mario Miranda Chair visiting professor at Goa University. His diverse works, which include public art works, have been exhibited in India, England, Russia, France, Japan, Canada, and various other countries.

== Biography ==
Orijit Sen studied at the National Institute of Design (NID), Ahmedabad in the 1980s. He recalled that "I read whatever underground comics I could get my hands on. These included Robert Crumb and Art Spiegelman. I was blown away by Spiegelman’s Maus." In his words, Maus validated his artistic convictions and inspired him to pursue drawing and making comics.

After leaving NID Ahmedabad, Sen got involved with the Narmada Bachao Andolan and worked closely with the activists and the displaced adivasis. With the help of a grant from the non-profit organisation Kalpavriksh, Sen created India's first graphic novel, River of Stories.

Sen faced a tough time trying to find readers for River of Stories. Many "bookshops refused to stock it as it didn’t fit into any of the categories that they displayed" and Sen was compelled to stock it at his studio and shop People Tree. River of Stories was long out of print. However, in the last decade in India, a loyal and serious readership of graphic novels and comic books has been developing gradually, and in 2022 Blaft Publications released a new edition of River of Stories, with a foreword by Arundhati Roy.

Sen created Telling Tales for over two years for India Magazine. He worked on the illustration for Trash!: On Ragpicker Children and Recycling (2004). He collaborated with Manipuri artists to create IMUNG: Manipur Home Care Handbook, a guide for HIV and AIDS healthcare in Manipur. He put together a set of comics for the National Council of Educational Research and Training (NCERT), India.

Sen is creating the visual identity of the first ever India-Palestine theatre collaboration Freedom Jatha between Jana Natya Manch (Janam), Delhi, India and The Freedom Theatre, Jenin, Palestine; he's designed five original Freedom Jatha artworks. Sen's collaboration with Janam dates back to 1992 when he first designed the set, poster, and brochure for the production of Govind Purushottam Deshpande's Satyashodhak on the life and times of Jyotirao Phule. The Janam logo is also a 2007 creation by Sen.

== Projects ==
The Pao Collective - Sen is one of the five founders of The Pao Collective. Founded in 2009, the collective aims to "support comics as a medium and a culture in India. Originally, they imagined establishing an outpost of sorts for comics culture in Delhi, from which they could reach out to and support creators in other cities and areas around the country." PAO: the Anthology of Comics Volume 1, published by Penguin India in 2012, won the 2nd Comic Con India Awards 2012 in the Best Graphic Anthology category.

A Place In Punjab - 7 storey-high "walk-through mural experience" that takes the visitor through sights and insights of Punjabi life at the Virasat-e-Khalsa in Anandpur Sahib, Punjab. Sen conceived this mural project and worked with 13 collaborators to execute it. It opened in November 2011. The multimedia museum Virasat-e-Khalsa in which Sen's mural creation is located was designed by renowned Boston-based architect Moshe Safdie.

Mapping Mapusa Market - As the Mario Miranda Chair visiting professor at Goa University, Sen initiated Mapping Mapusa Market. It brings together "artists, designers, writers, teachers, students and interested members of the public to explore and document the complex life of the Mapusa Market in Goa from a variety of perspectives- illustrations, photographs, videos and interviews. The project looked at how a historical market evolved and how it is coping with the challenges of globalisation, consumerism and supermarket and mall culture".

== Awards ==
PAO: The Anthology Of Comics 1 by Penguin Books India won the 2nd Comic Con India Awards 2012 in the Best Graphic Anthology category.

== Exhibitions ==
- 2015 The Disappearing Tiger, a T-shirt designed by Sen, featured in "The Fabric of India" exhibition at the Victoria and Albert Museum, London.
- 2015 From Punjab, with Love at Surrey Art Gallery, North Surrey, Canada - a digital reproduction of Sen's famous 75-metre-long fibreglass and acrylic mural at the Moshe Safdie designed Virasat-e-Khalsa Museum in Anandpur Sahib, India
- 2014 Imposters — an exhibition of screen printed posters at Galleryske, Bengaluru, India
- 2012 A Place In Punjab at Galleryske, Bengaluru, India

== Bibliography ==
- River of Stories (Kalpavriksh, 1994)
- Telling Tales, a column for India Magazine
- Illustration work for Trash!: On Ragpicker Children and Recycling (2004)
- IMUNG: Manipur Home Care Handbook, a guide for HIV and AIDS healthcare in Manipur
- Hair Burns Like Grass (in PAO: The Anthology Of Comics 1 by Penguin Books, India, 2012)
- Emerald Apsara (in The Obliterary Journal by Blaft Publications, 2012 ISBN 9789383260799)
- A Travancore Tale
