= Kishen Pattnaik =

Indian social leader, socialist thinker, author and activist

Member: 3rd Lok Sabha
- In office 1962–1967
- Preceded by: Banamali Babu
- Succeeded by: Shraddhakar Supakar
- Constituency: Sambalpur

Personal details
- Born: Kishen Pattnaik; 30 July 1930 Bhawanipatna, Kalahandi, British India
- Died: 27 September 2004 (aged 74) Bhubaneswar
- Party: Socialist Party, Samajwadi Jan Parishad
- Spouse: Vani Manjari Das
- Education: Brajamohan High School
- Profession: Social Activist, politician

Kishen Pattanayak (30 June 1930 – 27 September 2004) was an Indian social leader, socialist thinker, author and activist. As a member of parliament for the 3rd Lok Sabha, he represented the Socialist Party for the Sambalpur Constituency of India. Pattnaik founded and edited a Hindi monthly periodical called Samayik Varta.

== Early life ==
Kishen Pattnaik was born in Kalahandi State, located in the forest-covered region of Kashipur. Currently, it is Kasipur Block of Rayagada Dist. As a child, he attended a school named Tati Ghera, where his father worked as a teacher. After moving to his maternal uncle's house in Bhawanipatna, he enrolled in classes in 1946 in Rajendra College, Bolangir. He then received his bachelor's degree and Master of Arts at the university in Nagpur. In 1951, he returned to Bhawanipatna and began teaching at the Braja Mohan High School.

== Social work ==
After numerous deaths due to starvation were reported in the Kalahandi district, Pattnaik and activist Kapil Narayan Tiwari filed a public interest litigation against the State of Odisha.

== Political activism and election ==
In 1962, 27-year-old Kishen Pattnaik became one of the youngest candidates elected from the Sambalpur parliamentary constituency.

In 1995, along with leaders like Jugal Kishore Roybir, Bhai Vaidya and emerging youths like Sunil, Adv. Joshy Jacob, Kishen Pattnaik co-founded Samajwadi Jana Parishad.

== Publications ==
Book name	Type	Publisher	Year of first publication	Language	ISBN	Translated into
Vikalpahin nahin hai duniya विकल्पहीन नहीं है दुनिया (The Universe is Not Without Alternatives)	Collection of 44 Articles	Raj Kamal Prakashan, New Delhi	2000	Hindi	81-267-0023-8	
Kisan Andolan – Dasha aur Disha किसान आन्दोलन – दशा और दिशा (On Farmers' Movements of India)	Single Book in 2 parts	Raj Kamal Prakashan, New Delhi, Allahabad, Patna	2006	Hindi	81-267-1261-9	
Bichara Ra Tipa Khata ବିଚାରର ଟିପା ଖାତା (A Notebook of Thoughts)	Collection of 18 Articles	Bikalpa Prakashan, Bargarh	2004	Oriya	NA	
Bharat Shudron ka Hoga भारत शूद्रों का होगा (India Will Be of the Destitutes)	Collection of 11 Articles	Samata Prakashan, Delhi	May 1995	Hindi	NA	Oriya (Sept. 2005) By; Surendra Patra
Bharatiya Buddhijibira Sankata; O Anyanya Prabandha ଭାରତୀୟ ବୁଦ୍ଧିଜୀବୀର ସଂକଟ ଓ ଅନ୍ୟାନ୍ୟ ପ୍ରବନ୍ଧ (The Crisis of Indian Intellectual)	Collection of 7 Articles	Subarnarekha, Cuttack	2001	Oriya	81-87467-08-8	
Bharatiya Raajniti par ek drishti भारतीय राजनीति पर एक दृष्टि (A Glimpse on the Indian Politics)	Collection of 45 articles in 5 parts Single Book	Raj Kamal, Delhi, Patna	2006	Hindi	81-267-1260-0	
Smrutira Sunila Sarasi ସ୍ମୃତିର ସୁନୀଳ ସରସୀ (In Memory of Kishen Pattnaik)	45 articles on Kishen Pattnaik	Bikalpa Prakashan, Bargarh	29 June 2005	Oriya		
