= Samajwadi Jan Parishad =

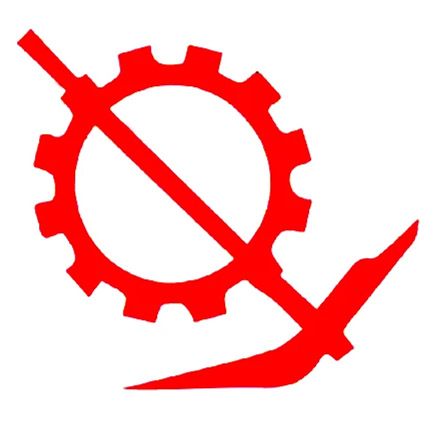
- Abbreviation: S.W.J.P.
- President: Lingaraj Azad
- General Secretary: Aflatoon (Uttar Pradesh)
- Treasurer: Ganesh Raghunath Raorane
- Founder: Kishen Pattnaik; Jugal Kishore Roybir
- Founded: 1995
- Headquarters: D.28/160, Pande Haveli, Varanasi, Uttar Pradesh-221001
- Newspaper: Samyik Varta
- Student wing: Vidhyarthi Yuva Jan Sabha
- Peasant's wing: Kisan Mazdoor Parishad
- Ideology: Democratic socialism
- Political position: Left-wing
- Alliance: National Alliance of People's Movements

Party flag

Website
- swjp.in

Samajwadi Jana Parishad (translation: "Socialist People's Congress"), is a socialist political party in India.

== Foundation ==
The party was founded in 1995 by late Kishen Pattanayak and many grassroot level political organisations who believed in creating an alternative political culture. Active members of the party cannot have any association with foreign funded NGOs. The ideology of the party is based upon the thoughts of Mahatma Gandhi, Ram Manohar Lohia, Jayaprakash Narayan and Ambedkar. It is active in 15 states. It believes that Globalisation is a counter-revolution phase and hence associates itself with anti-globalisation struggles.

It has involved in many historic struggles in various parts of India such as Mehdiganj, Mau (UP), Betul, Kesla (MP), Niyamgiri, Jagjitsinghpur-POSCO (Odisha), Jalpaiguri (North Bengal), Kudankulam (Tamil Nadu) etc...

This was the only party to have protested and almost barged into the Commonwealth Games Office at Central Delhi protesting against the huge spending by the Govt.

The party is very close to many popular people's movements. It is a founding member of the National Alliance of People's Movements N.A.P.M.

== Party structure ==
In the 14th biennial national conference held at Titilagarh (Odisha) on November 22 and 23, 2025. the following are elected as its new office bearers.

- President: Lingaraj Azad
- Vice Presidents:
  1. Mahesh Vikram
  2. Shivaji Gaikwad
  3. Satyendra Roy
- General Secretary: Aflatoon (Uttar Pradesh)
- Organizing Secretary: Chanchal Mukherjee
- Secretaries:
  1. Adv. Vishnu Dhoble
  2. Suresh Narikuni
- Treasurer: Ganesh Raorane

== Electoral records ==
It has been participating and contesting in general elections, but has not won any seats in the Rajyasabha or Loksabha or state assembly elections.

=== Madhya Pradesh - 2003 ===
The party took part in Madhya Pradesh elections, with four candidates:

- Mangal Sing for Ghora Dongri
- Fagram - Itarsi
- Shamim Modi - Harda
- Ajay Khare - Rewa

=== Maharashtra - 2004 ===
Sayeed Kasam Sayeed Jamruddin 192-Gangapur
