= Ashish Kothari =

Indian ecologist and author

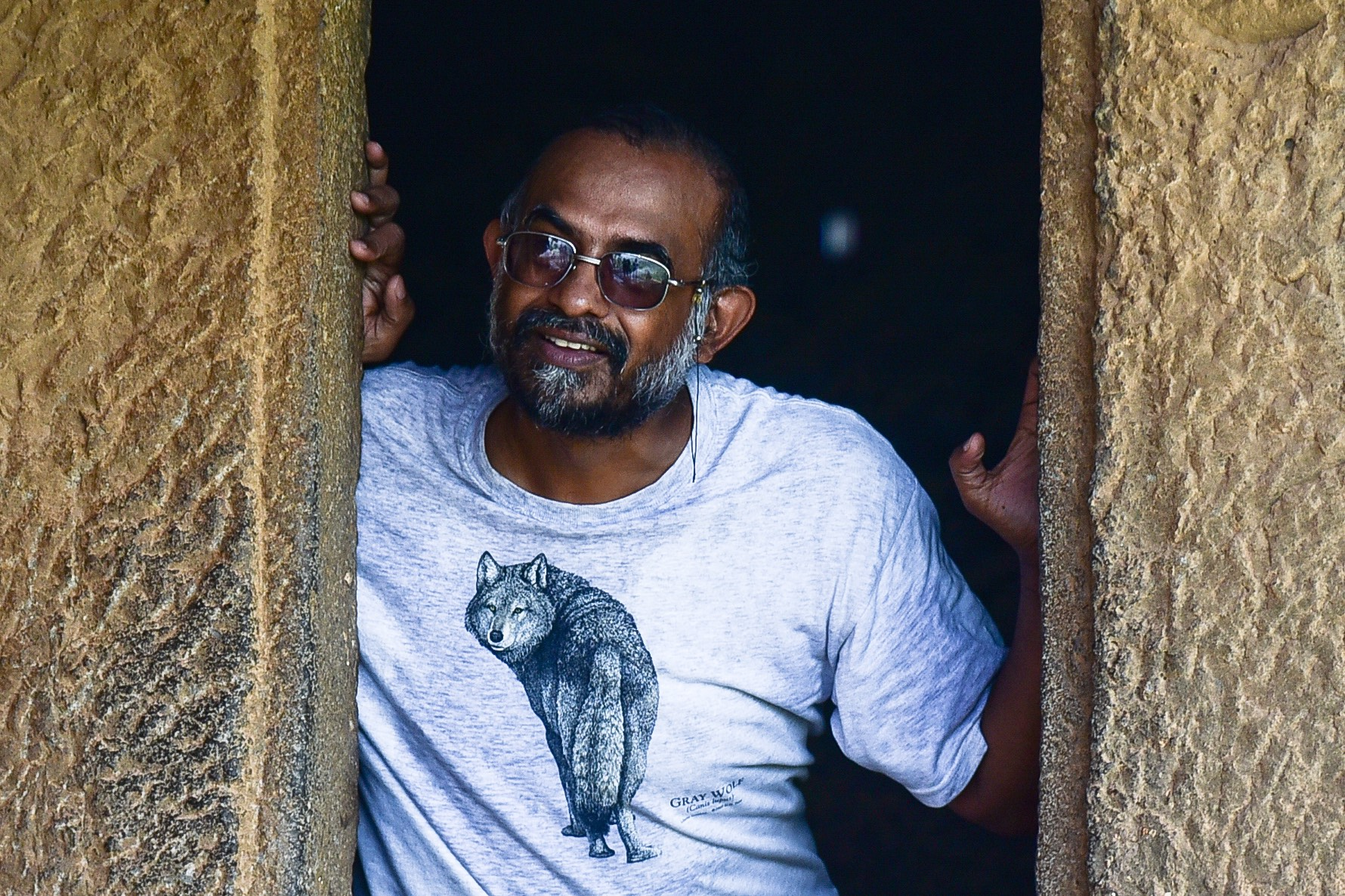
- Citizenship: Indian
- Education: University of Delhi
- Known for: Kalpavriksh

Ashish Kothari is an Indian environmentalist and author.

== Life ==
Ashish Kothari studied Sociology at Hindu College, University of Delhi, graduating in 1983. He then gained a master's of arts in Sociology from Delhi School of Economics, University of Delhi in 1985. He is one of the founders of Kalpavriksh, a non-profit organisation in India which deals with environmental and development issues. Kothari has also been a teacher at Indian Institute of Public Administration, New Delhi.

Ashish Kothari has also worked as members of several Government of India committees, including the Environmental Appraisal Committee on River Valley Projects and committees to draft design the National Wildlife Action Plan and the Biological Diversity Act. In 2012, he published Churning The Earth: The Making of Global India with Aseem Shrivastava. He edited the book Alternative Futures with K. J. Joy in 2017.

== Selected works ==
- Joy, K. J.; Kothari, Ashish, eds. (2017). Alternative Futures: India Unshackled. Independently Published. ISBN 978-1973383109.
- Shrivastava, Aseem; Kothari, Ashish (2012). Churning the earth: The making of global India (1. publ ed.). New Delhi: Penguin Viking. ISBN 978-0670086252.
