= Jal Satyagraha =

The Jal Satyagraha protest in the Khandwa district of Madhya Pradesh, India, was a protest in 2015 by residents of Gogalgaon village, and neighboring hamlets, that involved them remaining immersed in the waters of the Narmada River, as the government had not yet rehabilitated them as promised. It was a part of Narmada Bachao Andolan.
