= Kerala Swatantra Matsya Thozhilali Federation =

The Kerala Swatantra Matsyathozhilali Federation (KSMTF, or the Kerala Independent Fishworkers Federation) is a trade union of small-scale artisanal fishers of the state of Kerala in South India. Small-scale fishworkers had been left out of the political mainstream in the politically charged Kerala province, as both the Left and the Right presupposed that they would only vote under the influence of the Catholic Church.

The union was formed in 1980, led by Thomas Kocherry. The Kerala Latin Catholic Fish Workers' Federation had been formed in 1977, but its Catholic affiliation prevented it from being inclusive. The KSMTF was a more militant and inclusive rival to it. Kocherry was also a leader of the National Fishermen's Forum which campaigned beyond Kerala.

The KSMTF was responsible for the political awakening of the small-scale fishing community in the early 1980s, when they had to struggle to preserve their livelihoods against the commercial trawlers whose fleet had rapidly expanded to unsustainable levels. Led by the Liberation Theology-inspired radical clergy, KSMTF took the fight to a political level, leading to far-reaching changes in governance (including a closed season for trawlers since 1988).
