= Kalpavriksh =

Indian non-profit organisation

- Type: Non-Governmental Organisation
- Headquarters: Flat no 5, 2nd Floor, Shri Dutta Krupa, 908, Deccan Gymkhana, Pune 411004, Maharashtra, India
- Location: Pune, India
- Website: kalpavriksh.org

Kalpavriksh is a non-profit organisation based in India with its office in Pune, Maharashtra. The organisation takes up research, networking, education, grassroots work, advocacy and activism in the field of environment, ecology, development, and alternatives. The institute was formed in 1979 when a student-led group began to campaign for Delhi Ridge Forest.

== See also ==
- Ashish Kothari
