= Gudahandi =

- ଗୁଡ଼ହାଣ୍ଡି (Odia)
- Interactive map of Gudahandi
- 19°37′5.023″N 82°32′54.389″E
- Type: Hills
- Location: Ampani, Koksara, Odisha

Site notes
- Elevation: 1,617 feet (493 m)
- Governing body: Government of Odisha
- Website: https://kalahandi.nic.in

Gudahandi also known as 'Gudahandi Hills' and 'Gudahandi Caves' is a pre-historic site in Odisha, India. It is located in the Ambapani sanctuary of Kalahandi district of Odisha. It is close to the Nabarangpur district Border and about 17 km and 88 km away from Ampani and District Headquarters Bhawanipatna respectively.

== History ==
The word Gudahandi is derived from two Odia words, guda meaning raw sugar and handi meaning a clay pot. The appearance of the hills resembles sugar pots that used to be used in Odisha. Pre-historic pictographs, drawings and inscriptions are crafted on the stone walls of the Gudahandi caves. These caves date back to 25,000 to 20,000 CE.

== Paleolithic Paintings ==
The rock art shelter exhibits both monochrome and bi-chrome paintings of early historic period. It is the only reported rock art site of Kalahandi district. The rock art panel preserves the specimen of paintings which include a stylized human figure in red, deer and a variety of geometric patterns of squares and rectangles either empty or in filled with straight and diagonal lines or with dots on the borders grid patterns, wheels with spokes, apsidal patterns, oval shapes with dots executed either in monochrome of red or in polychrome of red, blue and black.

== Gallery ==
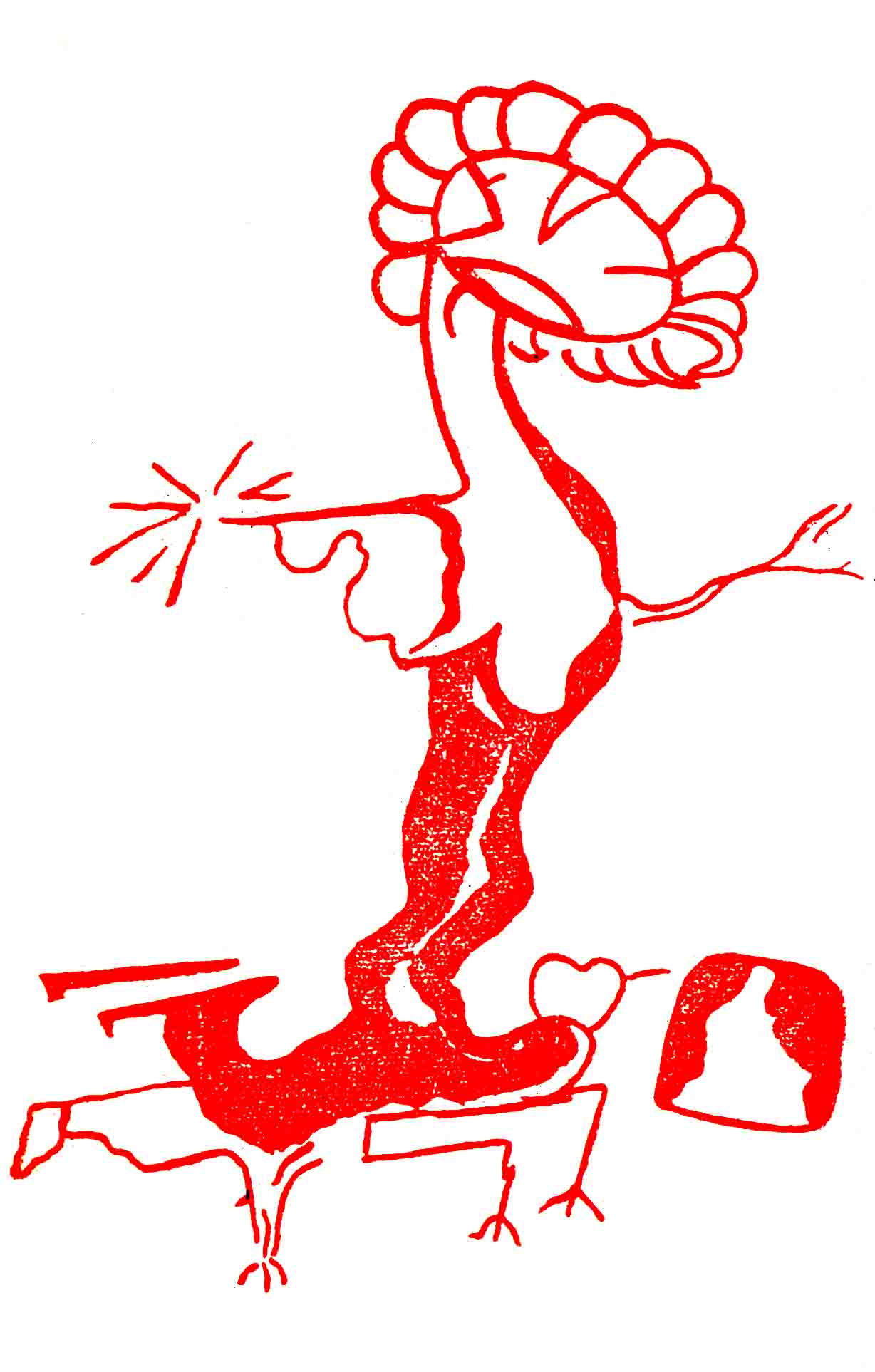

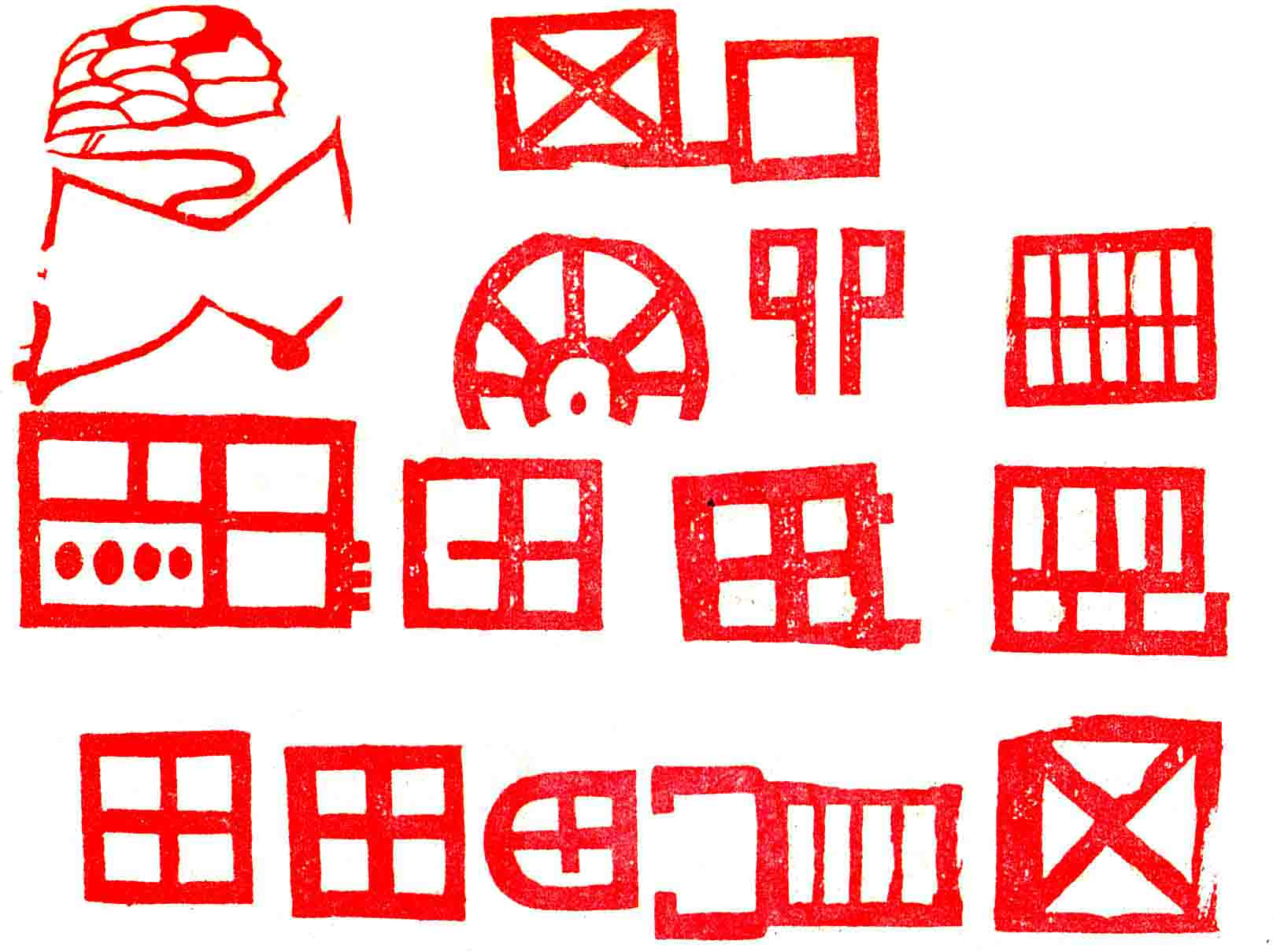
