= Chiladangari =

Village in Odisha State, India

- Village
- Location within Odisha Location within India
- Coordinates: 19°40′37″N 82°45′34″E
- Country: India
- State: Odisha
- District: Kalahandi
- Sub division: Dharmagarh
- Tehsil/Block/PS: Koksara
- Panchayat: Phupagaon

Population (2001)
  - Total: 1,500
- Time zone: UTC+05:30 (IST)
- Pincode: 766019

Chiladangari is a village of Koksara Block in Dharmagarh sub-division in Kalahandi District in Odisha State. This village comes under Phupagaon panchayat of Kokasara Tehsil in Kalahandi District. It also come under kasibahal RI circle. Chiladangari is 7 km distance from Koksara and 60 km distance from its District Main City Bhawanipatna. And 333 km distance from its State Main City Bhubaneswar.

== Demographics ==
According to census 2001, total population of Chiladangari was 1,000.

== Education ==
Schools nearby Chiladangari

- Chiladangari primary school

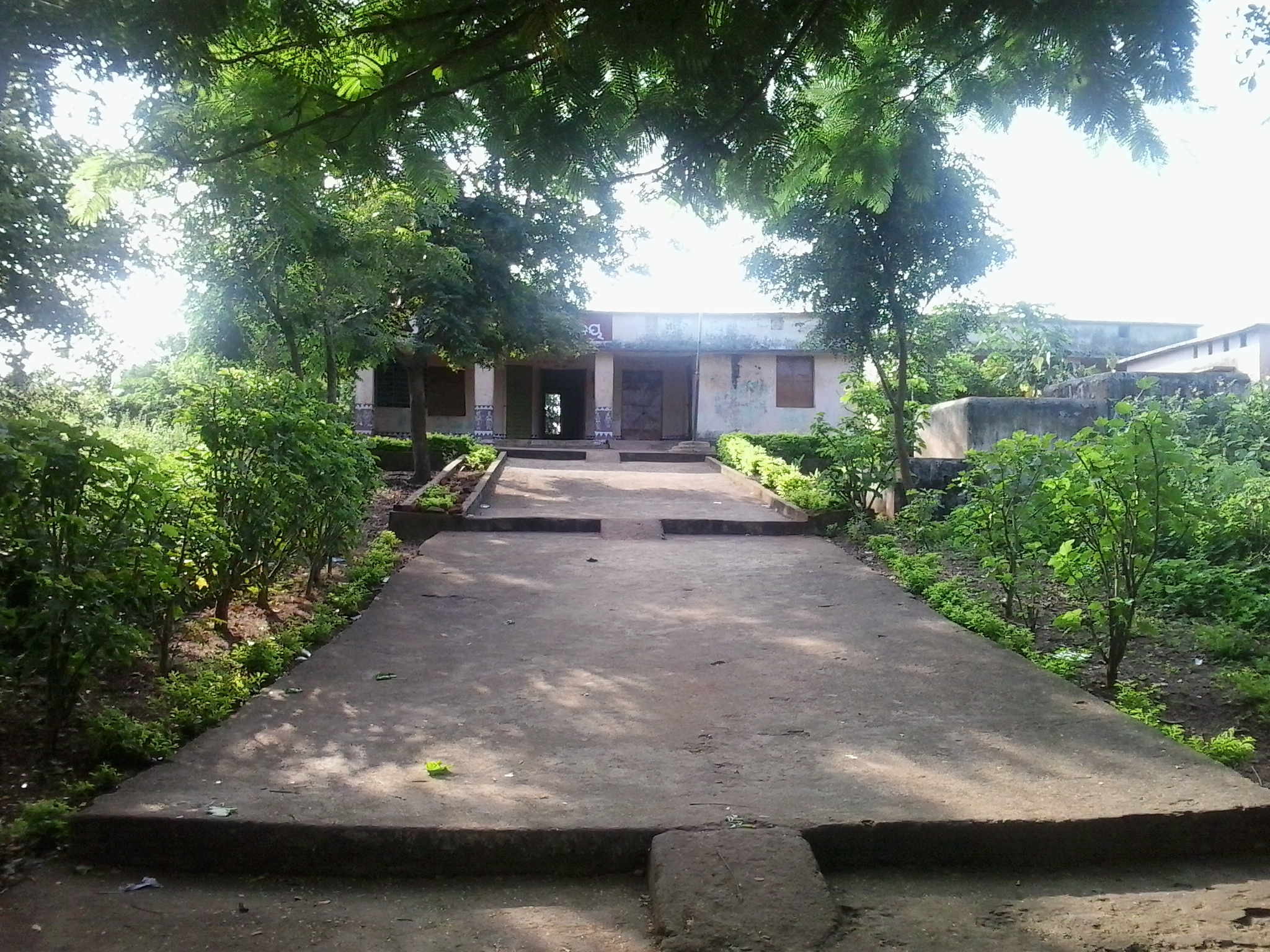
chiladangari school

- chiladangari M.E school
- saraswati sihu mandir kusumkhunti
- Phupagaon M.E school
- Phupagaon High School

Colleges nearby Chiladangari

- I v college Jaipatna
- Ladugaon Higher Secondary School, Ladugaon
- Panchayat Samiti Degree College, Koksara
- L.A. +2 Junior College, Behera
