= Banjariya =

Banjariya may refer to:

- Banjariya, Parasi, Lumbini Province, Nepal
- Banjariya, Bara, Nepal

== See also ==
- Banjari (disambiguation)
- Banjaria, Bihar, a village in Bihar, India
