= Banjari =

Banjari may refer to:

== Places ==
- Banjari, Bihar, a town in Bihar, India
- Banjari, Gopalganj, a village in Bihar, India
- Banjari, Katni, Madya Pradesh, India

== Other uses ==
- Banjari (deity), a Hindu deity
- Banjara or Lambadi, an ethnic group of India
  - Banjari language or Lambadi, their language

== See also ==
- Banjariya (disambiguation)
- Banjaran, a 1991 Indian film
- Banjara Hound, an Indian dog breed
- Banjara Hills, neighbourhood in Hyderabad, India
- Vanjari (caste), a community with origins traced to Rajasthan or northern India, now largely found in Maharashtra
