= Gatabandha =

Coordinates: 18.831°N 84.271°E

Gatabandha is a village of Koksara Block in Dharmagarh Sub-Division in Kalahandi District of Odisha State, India. This village comes under Phupagaon Panchayat of Kokasara Tehasil in Kalahandi District. It also comes under Kasibahal RI circle. Gatabandh is 7 km away from Koksara and 62 km distance from its District Headquarters Bhawanipatna and about 500 km away from its State Capital, Bhubaneswar.
