= Majursahi =

- Village
- Location within Odisha Location within India
- Coordinates: 19°39′09.3″N 82°44′27.1″E
- Country: India
- State: Odisha
- District: Kalahandi
- Sub Division: Dharmagarh
- Gram Panchayat: Phupagaon

Population (2001)
  - Total: 800
- Time zone: UTC+05:30 (IST)
- Pincode: 766019

Majursahi (Odia: ମଜୁରସାହି) is a village of Koksara Block in Dharmagarh Sub-Division in Kalahandi District of Odisha State. This village comes under Phupagaon Panchayat of Koksara Tahasil in Kalahandi District. It also comes under Kasibahal RI circle. Majursahi is 6.5 km distance from Koksara and 60 km distance from its District Headquarters Bhawanipatna. And about 500 km away from its State Capital Bhubaneswar.Many hundred years ago, majur or mayur (peacock) were seen in this village, so it is named Majursahi.

== Demographics ==
As per the Population Census 2011, there are total 192 families residing in the village Majursahi. The total population of Majursahi is 714 out of which 338 are males and 376 are females thus the Average Sex Ratio of Majursahi is 1,112.

The population of Children of age 0–6 years in Majursahi village is 113 which is 16% of the total population. There are 52 male children and 61 female children between the age 0–6 years. Thus as per the Census 2011 the Child Sex Ratio of Majursahi is 1,173 which is greater than Average Sex Ratio (1,112) of Majursahi village.

As per the Census 2011, the literacy rate of Majursahi is 54.7%. Thus Majursahi village has higher literacy rate compared to 50.9% of Kalahandi district. The male literacy rate is 70.28% and the female literacy rate is 40.63% in Majursahi village.

Population	Families	Literacy	Sex Ratio
714	192	54.74%	1,112

=== Gallery ===
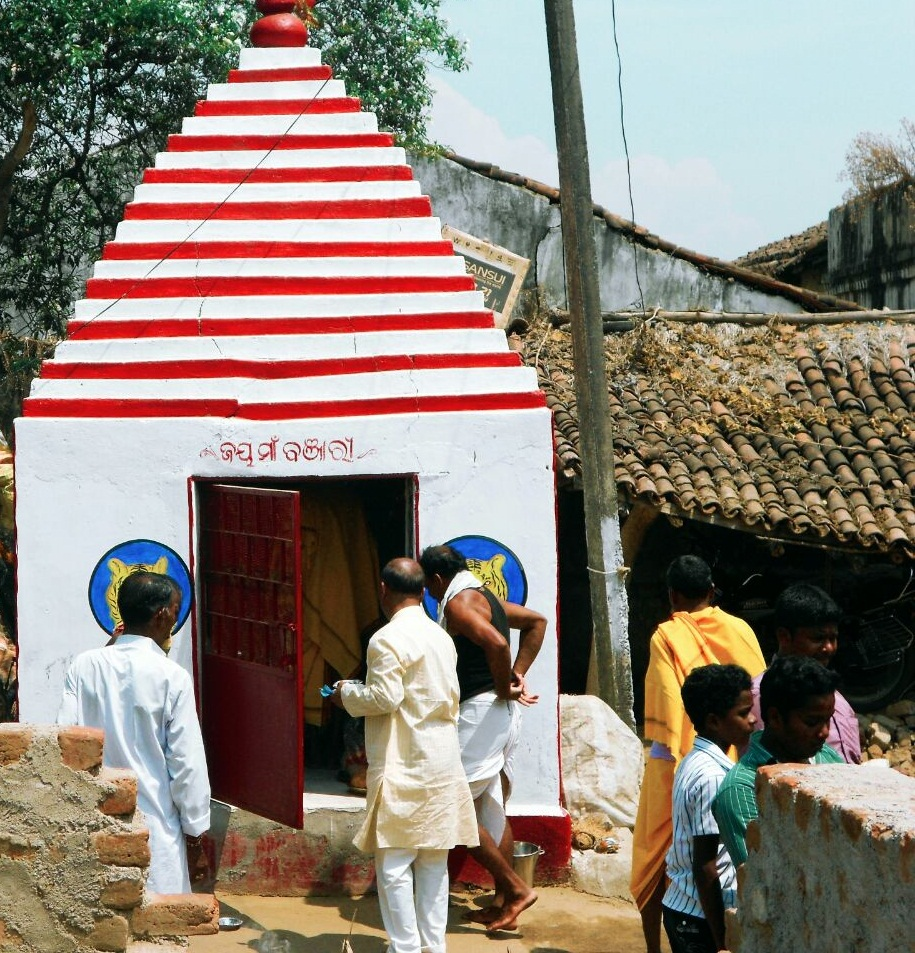

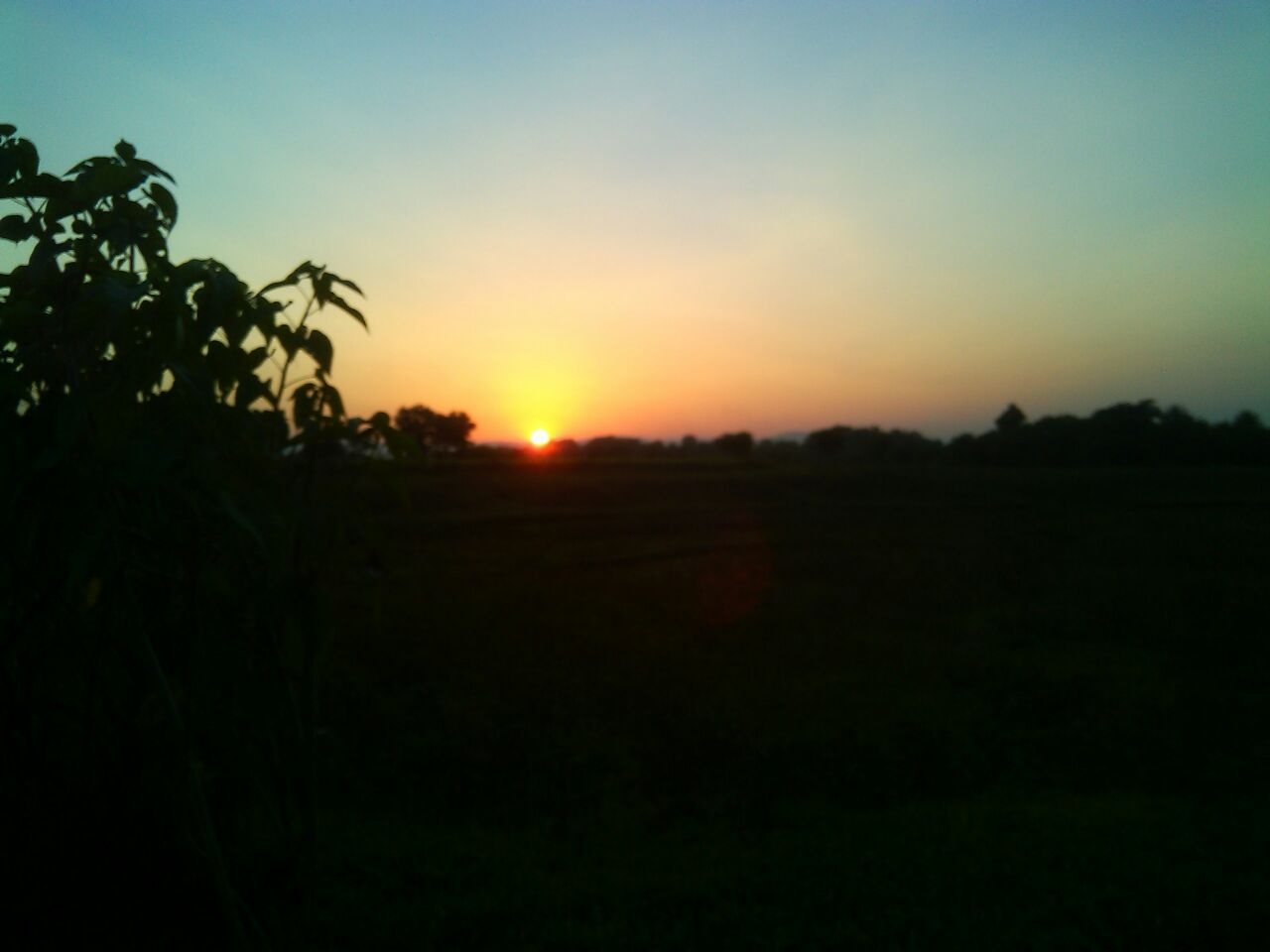

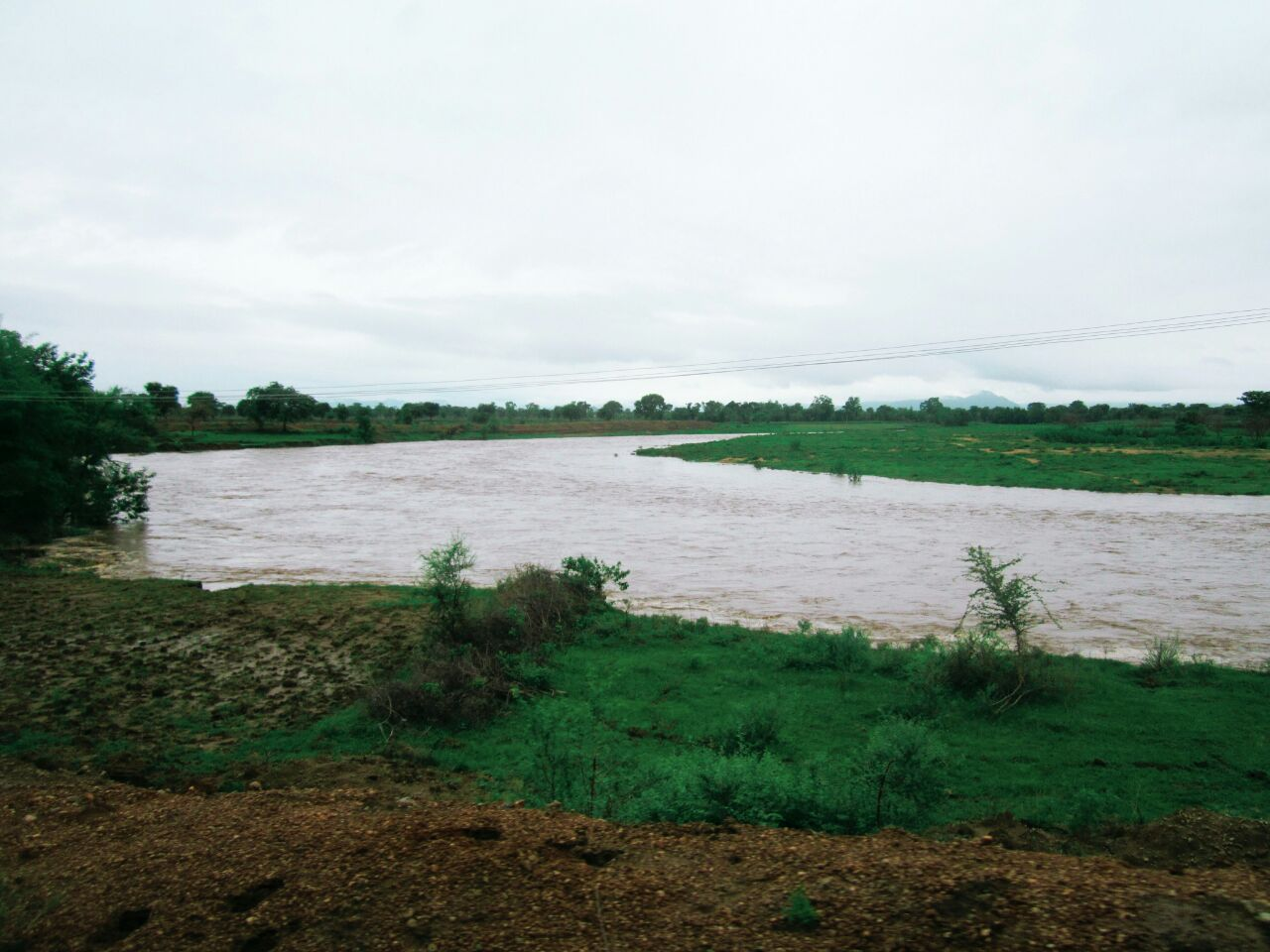

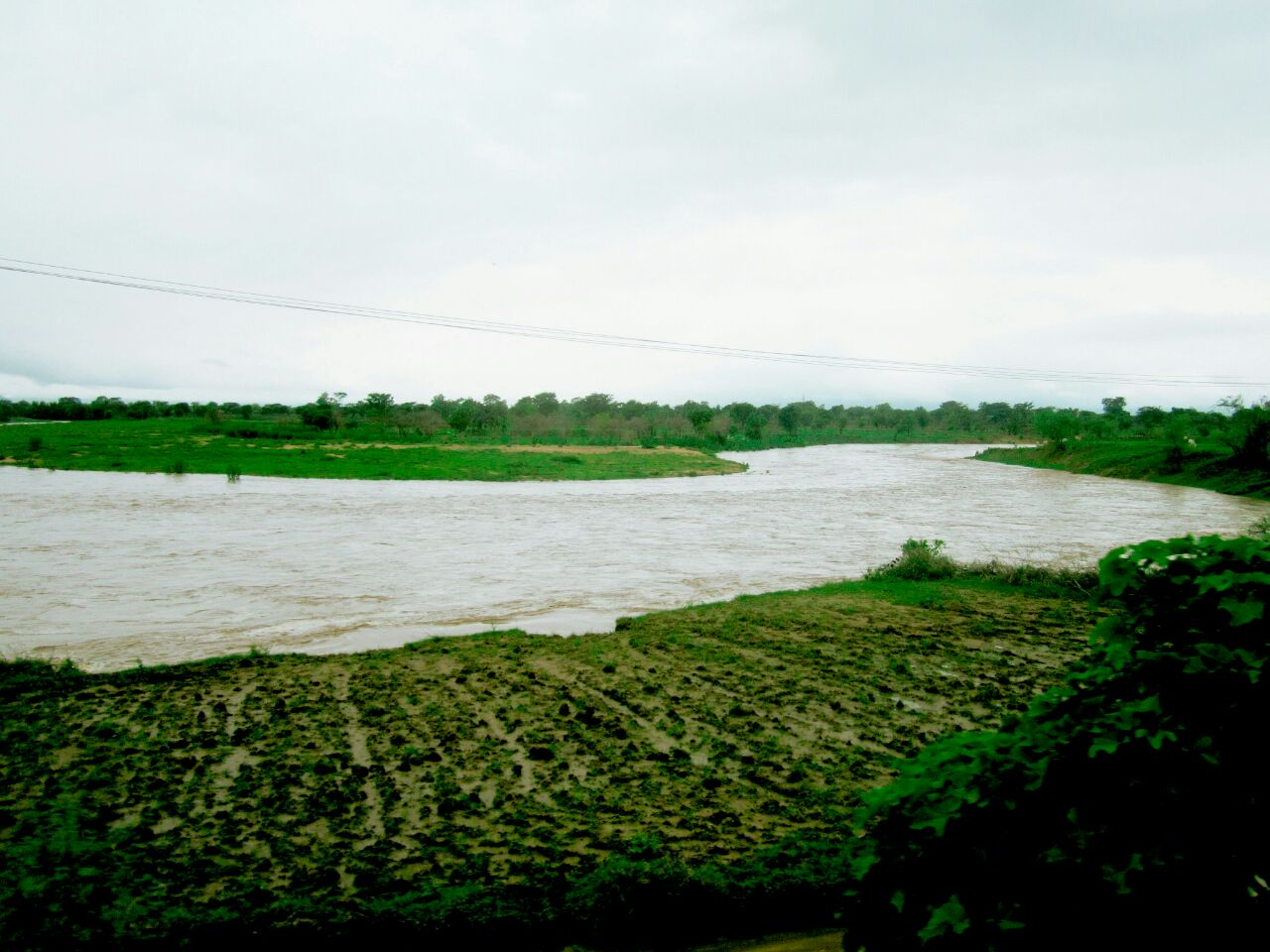

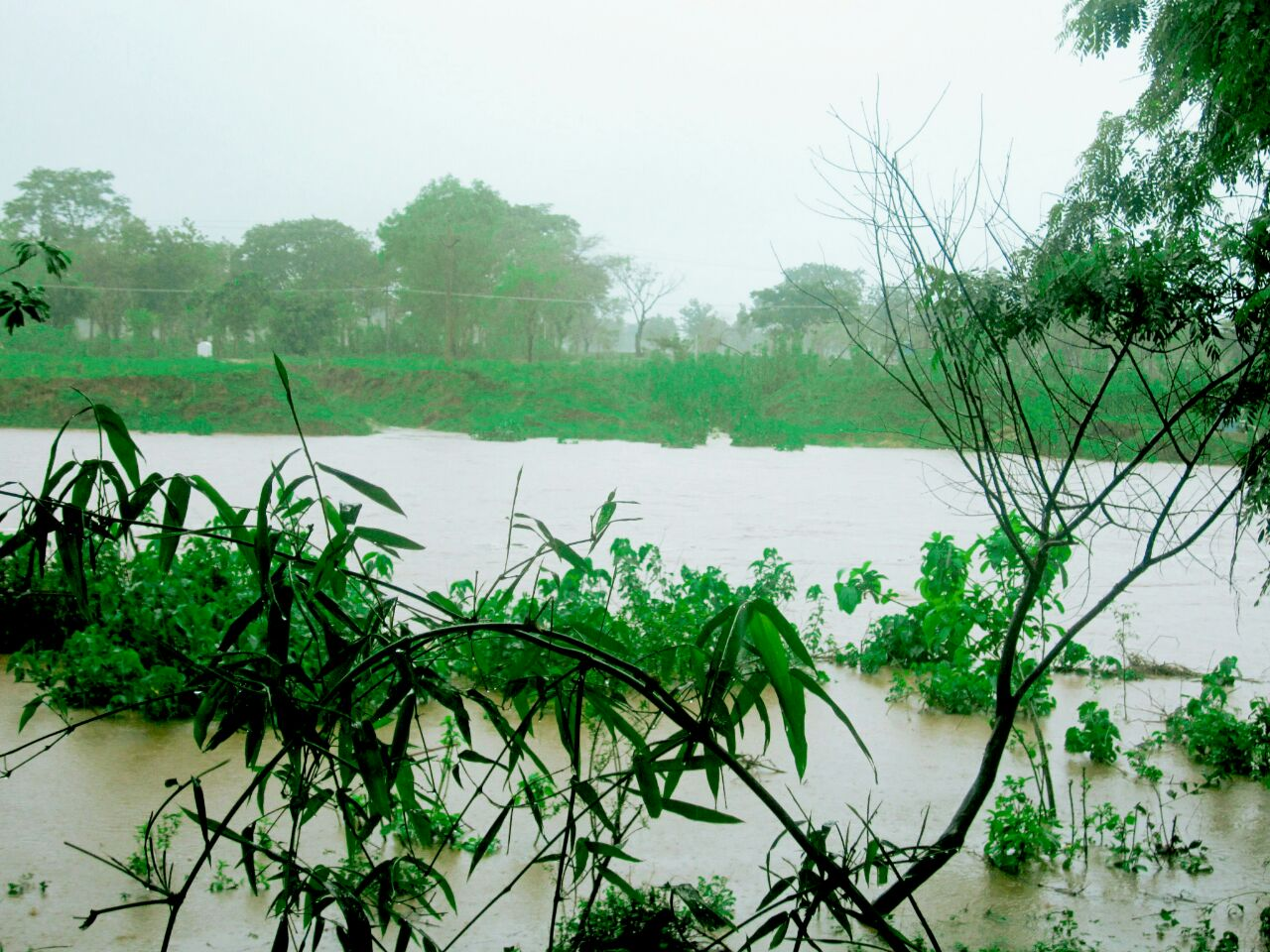

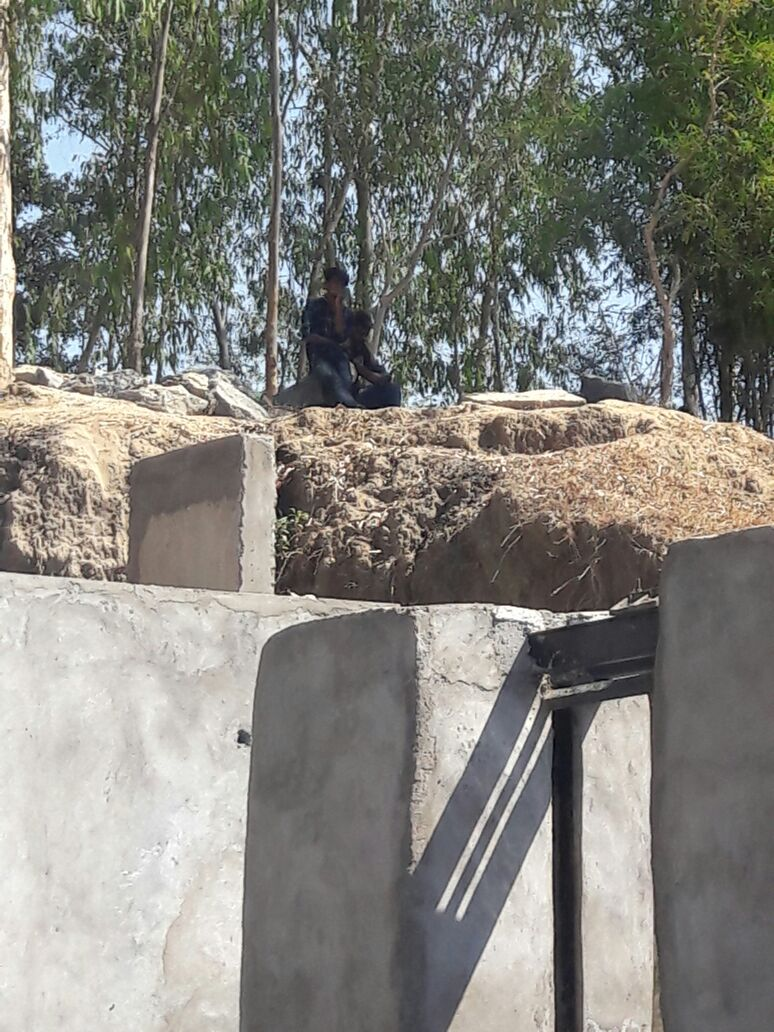

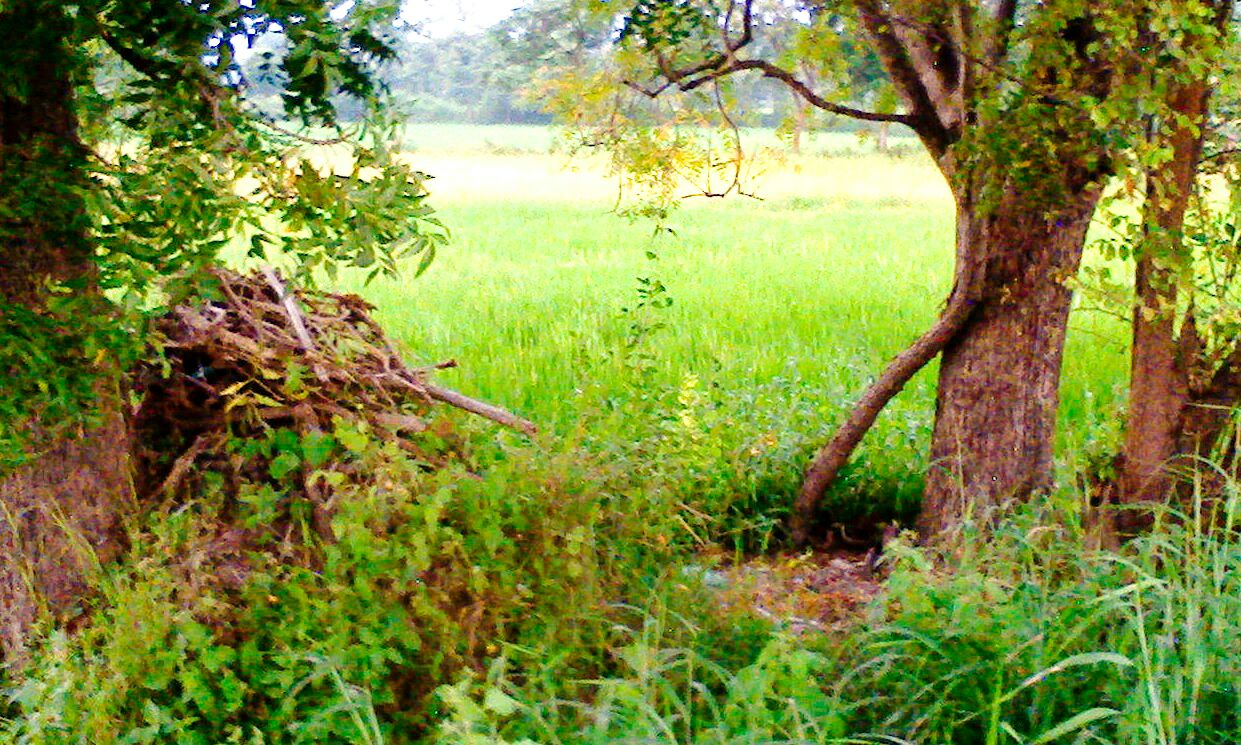

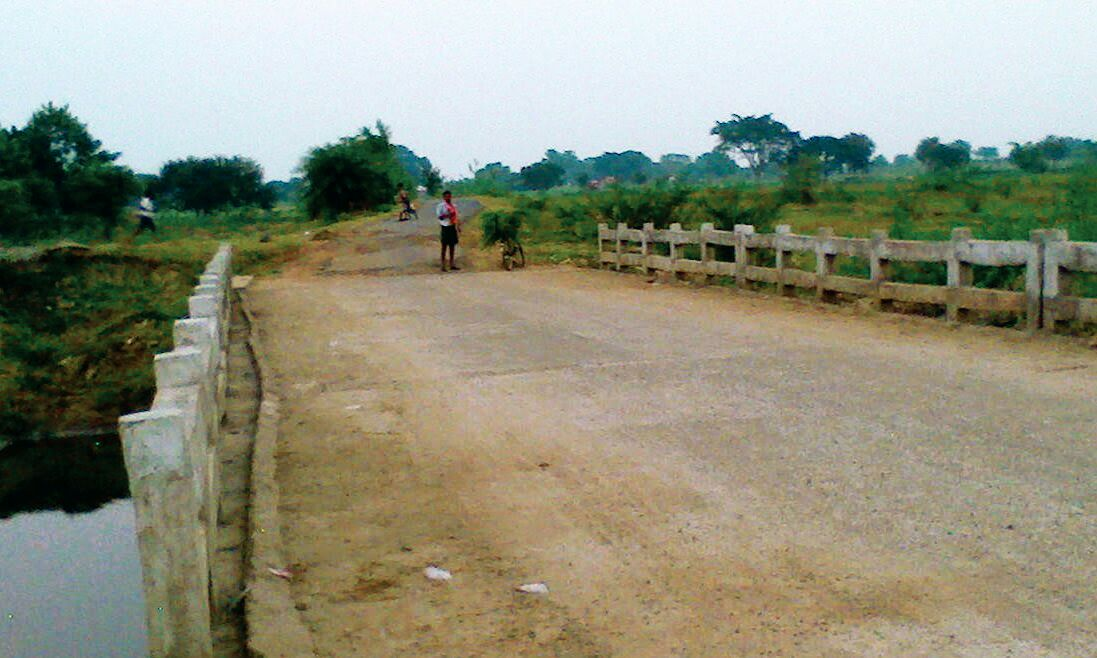

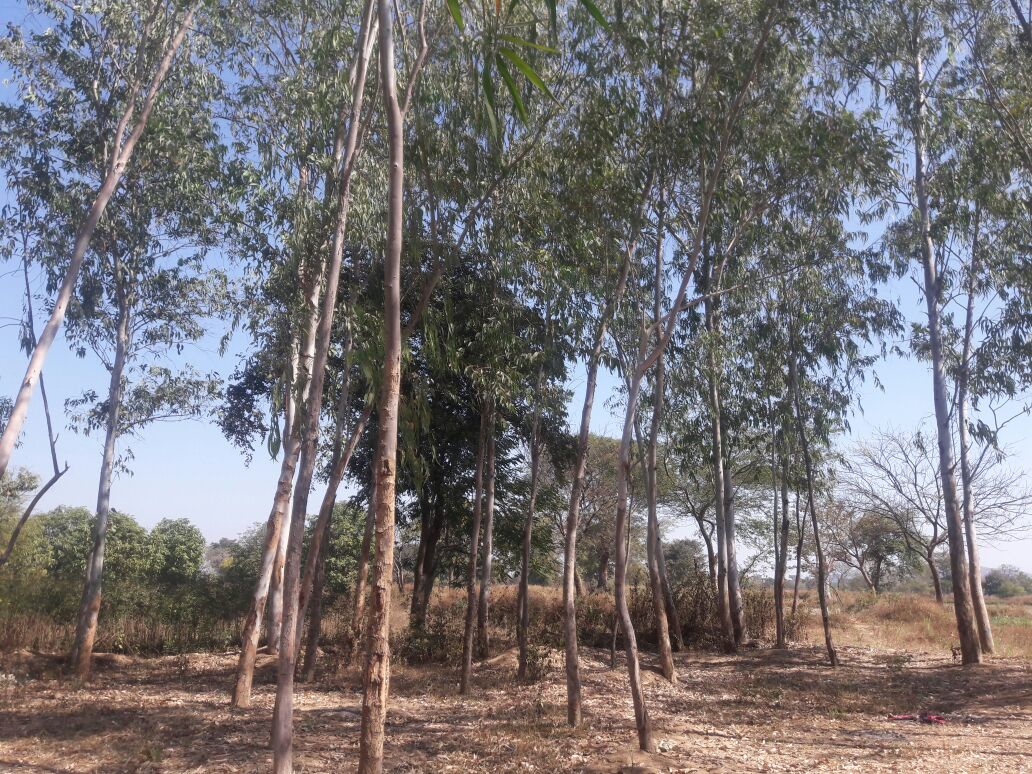

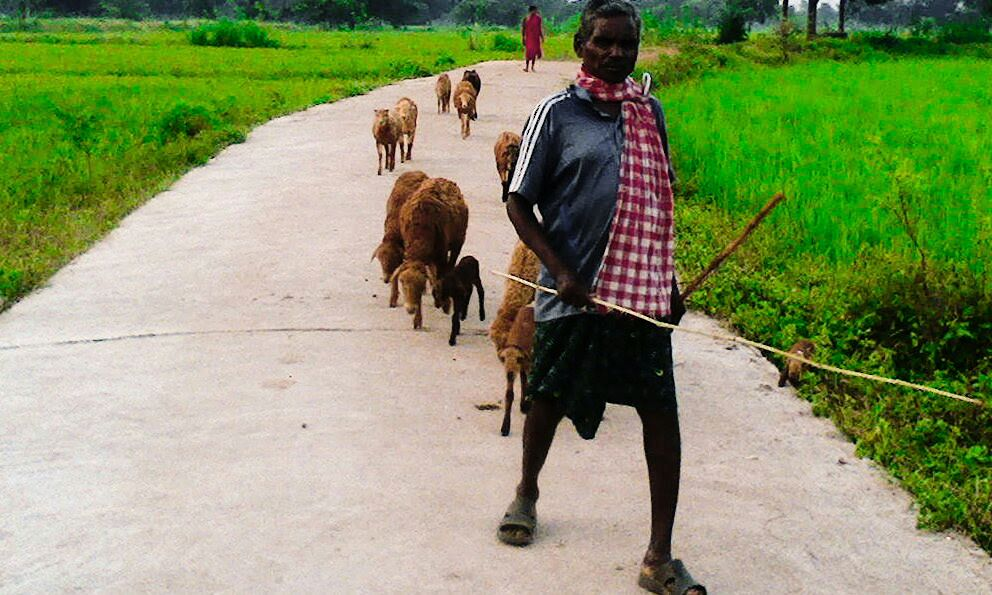

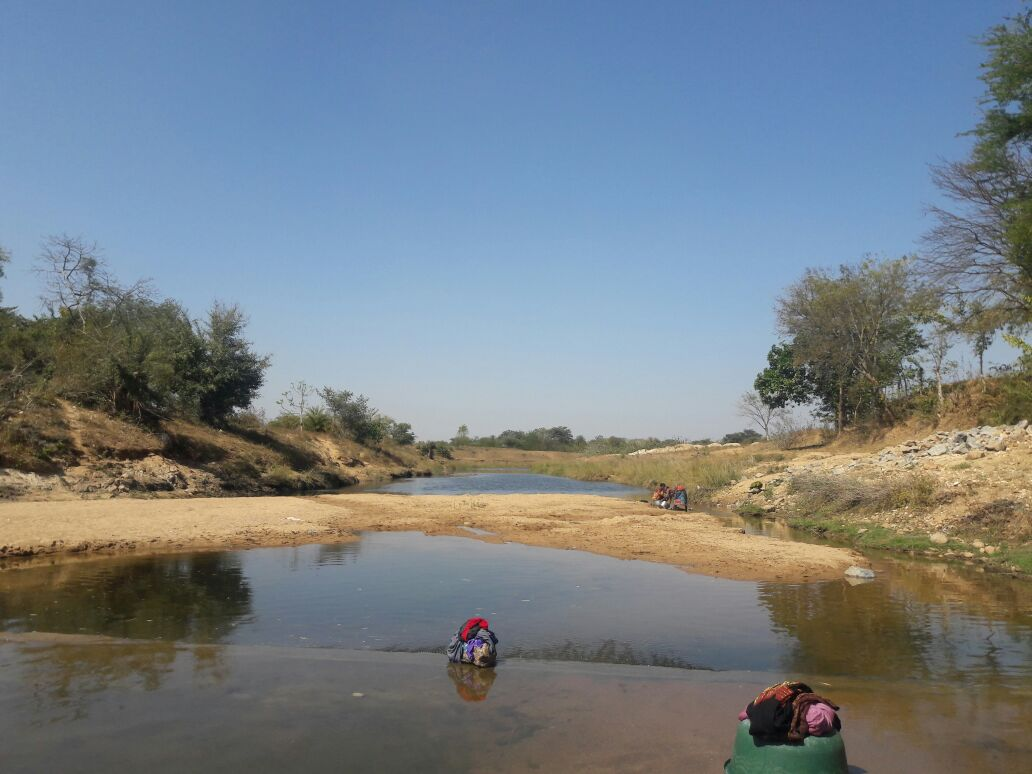

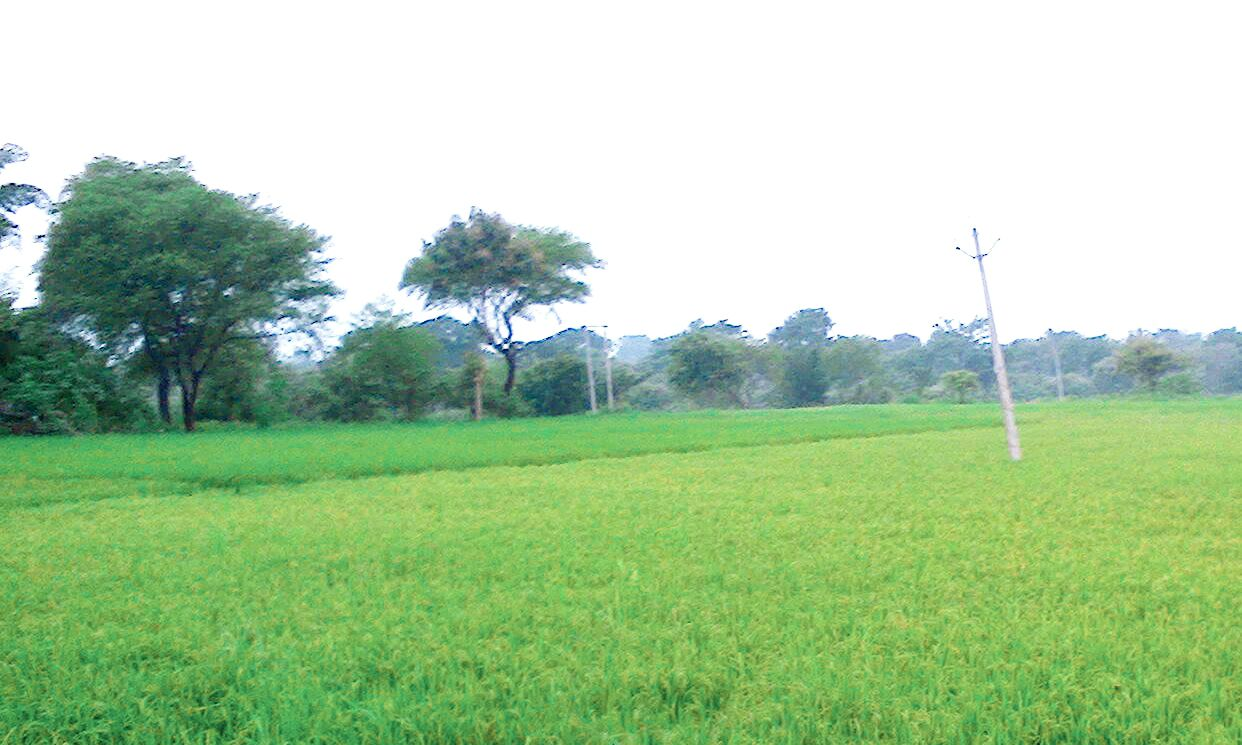

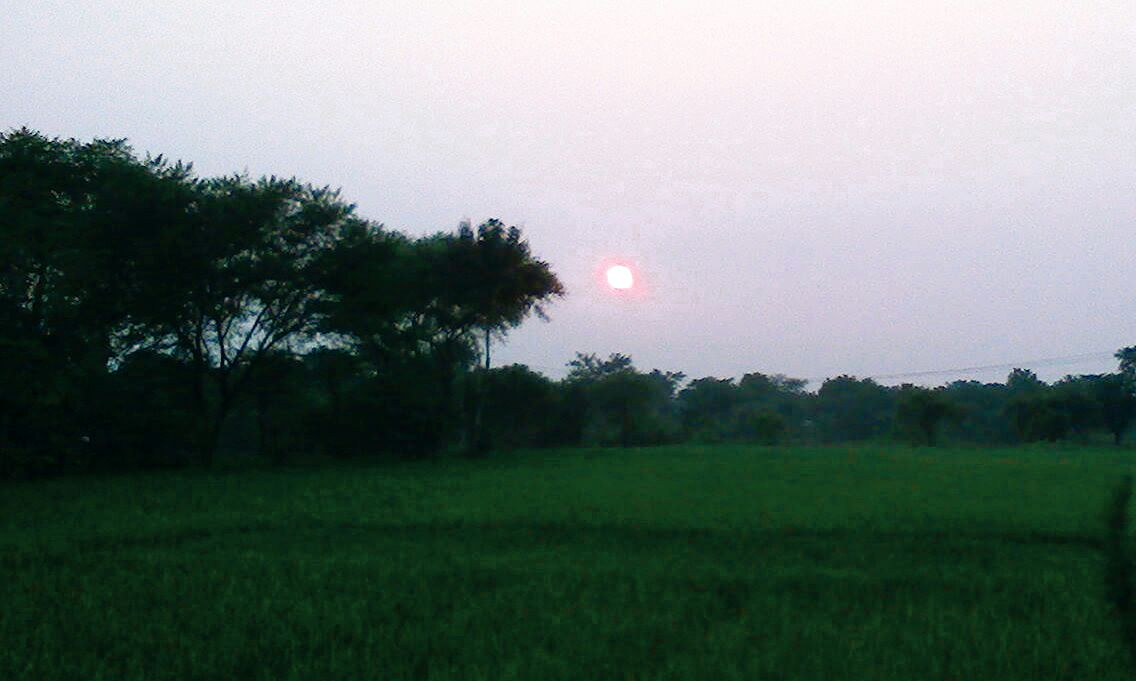

== Education ==
Schools Near By Majursahi

- Majursahi Primary & Upper Primary School
- Saraswati Sishu Mandir, Kusumkhunti
- Phupagaon M.E school
- Phupagaon N S C High School

Colleges Nearby By Majursahi

- Panchayat Samiti Degree College, Koksara
- Ladugaon Higher Secondary School, Ladugaon
- Indravati Degree College, Jaipatna
- L. A. +2 Junior College, Behera
