= Vanjari =

Vanjari may refer to:

- Vanjari caste, a community with origins traced to Rajasthan or northern India, now largely found in Maharashtra
- Vanjari, Punjab, a town Union Council of Mianwali District, Pakistan

== See also ==
- Banjara, nomadic tribes found in India
- Banjari (disambiguation)
- Vanjaram or the Indo-Pacific king mackerel
