= Banjari (deity) =

Hindu deity in Odisha, India

Banjari is one of the popular Hindu deity in Odisha, India. There are many Banjari temples present in the western and southern parts of Odisha. The temple at Raipur is dedicated to Banjari Mata.

The Banjari tribes in India also worship at these temples. Their patron deity is Banjari Devi and is usually represented by a heap of stones under a shady grove in the village outskirts.

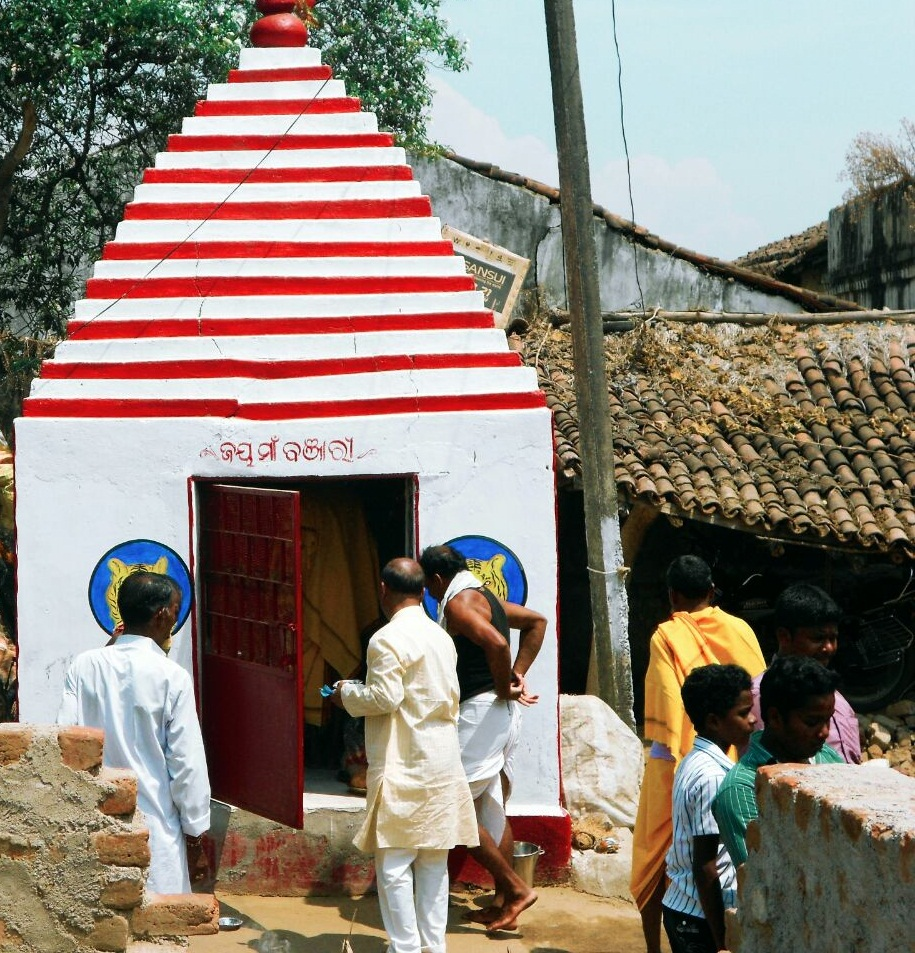
Modern Banjari Temple in Majursahi

The Banjari temple in Majursahi is well-recognized in Odisha. Banjari is also the primary deity associated with the Nial family of Majursahi in Majursahi. Magha Puja is one of the most popular festivals of Banjari at Majursahi. Chaitra is a festival associated with Banjari in Majursahi.

There is also a temple with the same name in Raipur, Banjari Mata Temple.

== Banjari temples ==
- Majursahi
- Junagarh
- Raipur
- Bhopal
