= Pachrukha, East Champaran =

Village in Bihar, India

Pachrukha
- Village
- Location within Bihar Location within India
- Coordinates: 26°44′02″N 84°54′03″E
- Country: India
- State: Bihar
- District: East Champaran
- Block: Banjaria

Government
  - Type: Sarpanch

Area
  - Total: 38.23 km^{2} (14.76 sq mi)
- Elevation: 70 m (230 ft)

Population (2011)
  - Total: 39,140
  - Density: 1,024/km^{2} (2,652/sq mi)

Languages
  - Official: Hindi, Maithili
- Time zone: UTC+5:30 (IST)
- PIN: 845315
- STD code: 06252
- Vehicle registration: BR-05

Pachrukha is a village in Banjaria Block, East Champaran District, Bihar, India. It is located near the Indian border with Nepal, about 11 kilometres north of the district seat Motihari, and 7 kilometres north of the block seat Banjaria. In 2011, it has a total population of 39,140.

== Geography ==
Pachrukha is located on the banks of Burhi Gandak River. It is bounded by Sukhi Dih in the north, Loknathpur in the east, Ajgari in the south, and Khairi in the west. It has a land area of 3823.4 hectares.

== Demographics ==
According to the 2011 Census of India, Pachrukha has 7,830 households. Among the 39,140 residents, 20,539 are male and 18,601 are female. The overall literacy rate is 37.62%, with 9,279 of the male population and 5,446 of the female population being literate. The census location code of the village is 217679.
