= Ampani =

- Town
- Location in Odisha, India Ampani (India)
- Coordinates: 19°35′0″N 82°38′0″E
- Country: India
- State: Odisha
- District: Kalahandi
- Elevation: 313 m (1,027 ft)

Population (2011)
  - Total: 4,622

Languages
  - Official: Odia
- Time zone: UTC+5:30 (IST)
- PIN: 766028
- Vehicle registration: OR-08/OD-08
- Sex ratio: 49.2:50.8 ♂/♀
- Website: odisha.gov.in

Ampani is a town in the Kalahandi district of the state of Odisha, in India. It is a gram panchayat that comes under Kokasara tehsil. It is 15 km from its main town and blocks Kokasara.

== Geography ==
It is located at 19°35′0″N 82°38′0″E at an elevation of 313m from mean sea level (MSL).

== Demographics ==
Ampani is a small village located in Kokasara Block of Kalahandi district, Orissa with a total of 608 families residing. The Ampani village has a population of 2693 of which 1394 are males while 1299 are females as per Population Census 2011. In Ampani village population of children, age 0-6 is 274 which makes up 10.17% of the total population of the village. The average Sex Ratio of Ampani village is 932 which is lower than Orissa state average of 979. Child Sex Ratio for the Ampani as per census is 702, lower than Orissa average of 941. Ampani village has a lower literacy rate compared to Orissa. In 2011, the literacy rate of Ampani village was 70.11% compared to 72.87% of Orissa. In Ampani Male literacy stands at 82.16% while the female literacy rate was 57.59%. As per the constitution of India and Panchyati Raaj Act, Ampani village is administrated by Sarpanch (Head of Village) who is elected representative of the village.

Caste Factor- In Ampani village, most of the village population is from Schedule Tribe (ST). Scheduled Tribe (ST) constitutes 59.93% while Schedule Caste (SC) was 12.70% of the total population in Ampani village.

Work Profile- In Ampani village out of the total population, 1287 were engaged in work activities. 49.81% of workers describe their work as Main Work (Employment or Earning more than 6 Months) while 50.19% were involved in Marginal activity providing a livelihood for less than 6 months. Of 1287 workers engaged in Main Work, 421 were cultivators (owner or co-owner) while 22 were Agricultural labourer

== Location ==
National Highway 26 (India, new numbering) passes through Ampani. The nearest airport is Swami Vivekananda Airport at Raipur and the nearest railway station is at Junagarh. It is 52 km away from Junagarh and 76 km from Bhawanipatna. Ampani is the border village of Kalahandi and Nabarangpur district.

District Headquarter: Kalahandi

State Capital: Bhubaneswar
Nearest Railway Station: Kesinga, Junagarh & Bhawanipatna
Nearest Airport: Bhubaneswar & Utkela Airport

Notes on how to get to Amapani: The nearest Railway Station to Kalahandi is at Kesinga, 45 km from Kalahandi city. This railhead is well connected to other major railway stations in the state. Taxi services are available from the railway station to Kalahandi at a fare of about Rs. 500. The nearest airport to Kalahandi is at Bhubaneswar, which is about 418 km away. Bhuvaneswar is well air connected with all major airports in India. Taxi services are available from the airport to Kalahandi and cost around Rs. 4000. Kalahandi is connected by regular bus services from many important cities in the state including Koraput, Bhubaneswar, and Berhampur. State-owned Road Transport Corporation and private bus service providers operate buses between Kalahandi and other cities. State buses charge about Rs. 120 from Bhubaneswar to Kalahandi.

== Tourist places ==
=== Ampani Hills ===
77 km from Bhawanipatna the picturesque Ampani hills present a panoramic view of nature. A rolling valley called “Haladigundi” in this hill range exhibits some peculiar features due to the reflected rays on the sun. In the morning and evening, the objects of vision appear yellow. The whole area abounds in spotted deer, Sambar and Black Panthers who can be seen at the Behera reservoir. 5 km away are the prehistoric cave paintings at Gudahandi.

=== Karak Waterfall ===
Karak is a perennial waterfall located 3 km from Ampani. It is a beautiful place for travellers, adventurers, and picnic lovers. The waterfall is surrounded by a thick forest.
