= Banjari, Gopalganj =

Banjari
- Village
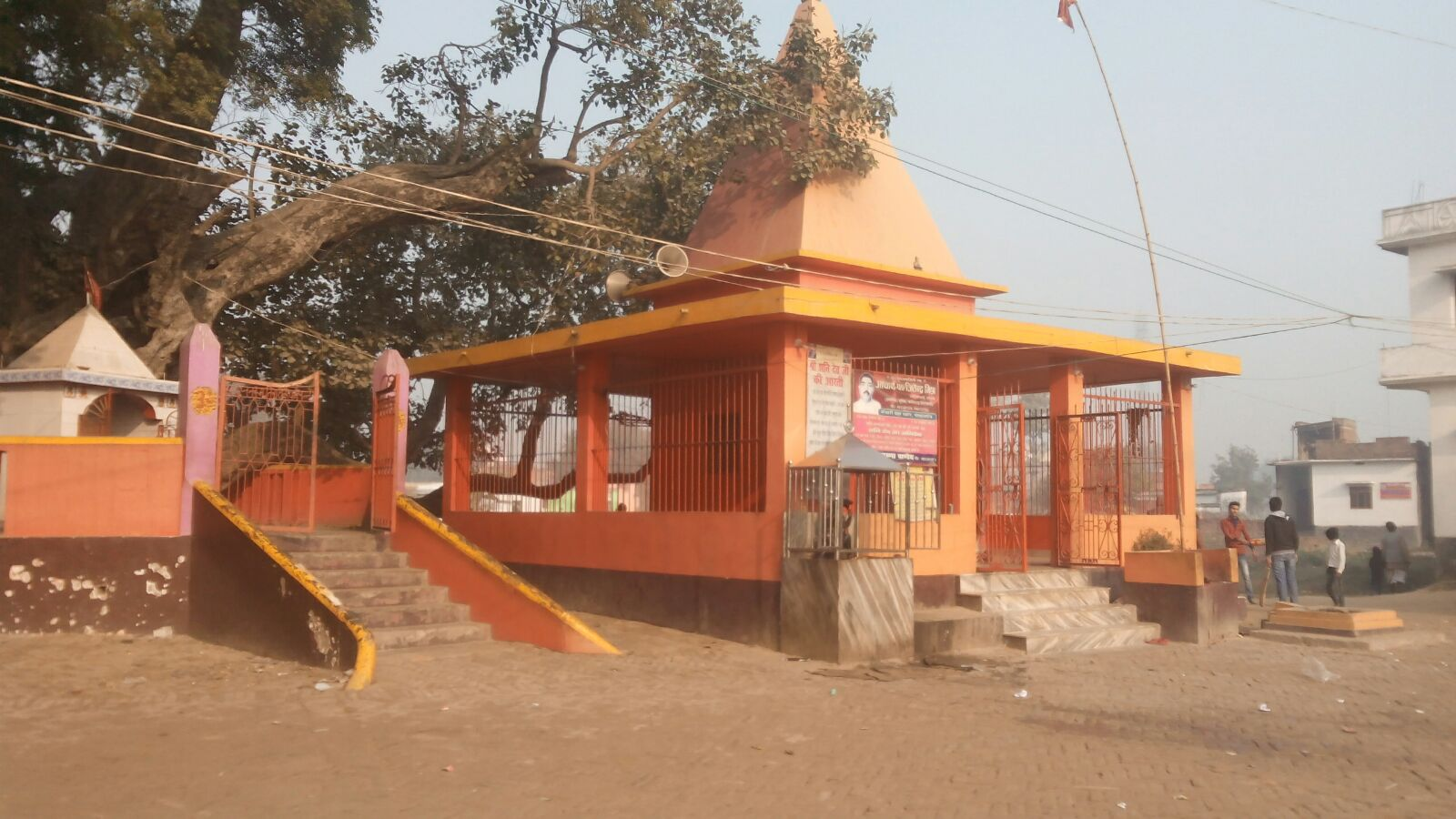

- Location in Bihar, India Banjari (India)
- Country: India
- State: Bihar
- District: Gopalganj

Government
  - Type: Panchayati raj (India)
  - Body: Gram panchayat
- Elevation: 66 m (217 ft)

Population (2011)
  - Total: 2,296

Languages
  - Official: Hindi
- Time zone: UTC+5:30 (IST)
- PIN: 841428
- Telephone code: 0 6156
- Vehicle registration: BR-28

Banjari is a large village in Gopalganj District of Bihar, India. It is located 1.3 km towards North-West from the district headquarters Gopalganj. Banjari village code is 1495000. It comes under the administration of Basdila Khas Gram panchayat.

Mahatma Gandhi said, "India is a country of villages, one needs to see our country, visit to a village of this country". To my mind, Banjari has become a bright dream of M.K.Gandhi. Indeed, Banjari is being to be an ideal village and progressing by leaps and bounds. This village is known for their literacy rate growth. Banjari has generated a number of persons who have been living abroad such as, Saudi Arabia, Oman, Canada, Switzerland, Dubai, Kuwait, UAE, and South Africa etc. This place could be a good example of Hindi-Muslim unity, with a mixed culture. The paddy "Dhan" is cultivated at large scale. Banjari has a diverse climate, subtropical in general, with hot summers and cool winters.

== Demographics ==
Banjari is a large village located in Gopalganj of Gopalganj district, Bihar with total 352 families residing. The Banjari village has population of 2296 of which 1210 are males while 1086 are females as per Population Census 2011.

Banjari become the first choice of the people who are from the most rural areas of Gopalganj for the purpose of settling. It's all because of the connectivity of Banjari to the most important parts of Bihar is best compare to the other villages. The availability of best education in Banjari is not so costly compare to other places in Gopalganj. There are 4 high schools & 1 paramedical institute in Banjari. The village has also the only modern nursing home in Gopalganj named"Harson hospital &Trauma centre. The Banjari has also the only "F.M."radio station in Gopalganj named "Radio Rimjhim"....suno Dil se.

In Banjari village population of children with age 0-6 is 358 which makes up 15.59% of total population of village. Average Sex Ratio of Banjari village is 898 which is lower than Bihar state average of 918. Child Sex Ratio for the Banjari as per census is 845, lower than Bihar average of 935.

The population consists of a Hindu & Muslim community.The village has two temples & a mosque for prayers.

Hindi and Bhojpuri is a major communicable language; English are frequently heard. It's all because of the young generations who went to abroad.

== Transport ==
Gopalganj is the nearest railway station (3 km). Banjari is accessible by highway called NH-28 and now NH-27 according to google map. Banjari More is well connected through major towns like Siwan, Chapra, muzaffarpur, Motihari, Betiya, patna, Gorakhpur, etc. There are many private buses too that connect the town to Patna, Mujjafarpur, etc. Almost every family have a bike & some have cars too.

== Nearby places ==
Gopalganj police station is very close to the Banjari Village. Nearby villages consist of Bhitbherwan, Basdila, Chainpatti, Mukundiya, Fathan. A very famous & auspicious Hindu temple is about 6 km south called "Thawe wali maiya" which is a part of Kamakhya wali maiya (Assam).

== Literacy rate ==
Banjari village has good literacy rate compared to other villages in Bihar. In 2011, literacy rate of Banjari village was 76.63% compared to 61.80% of Bihar. In Banjari, Male literacy stands at 85.83% while female literacy rate was 66.49%.

== Banjari Braham Sthan Mandir ==
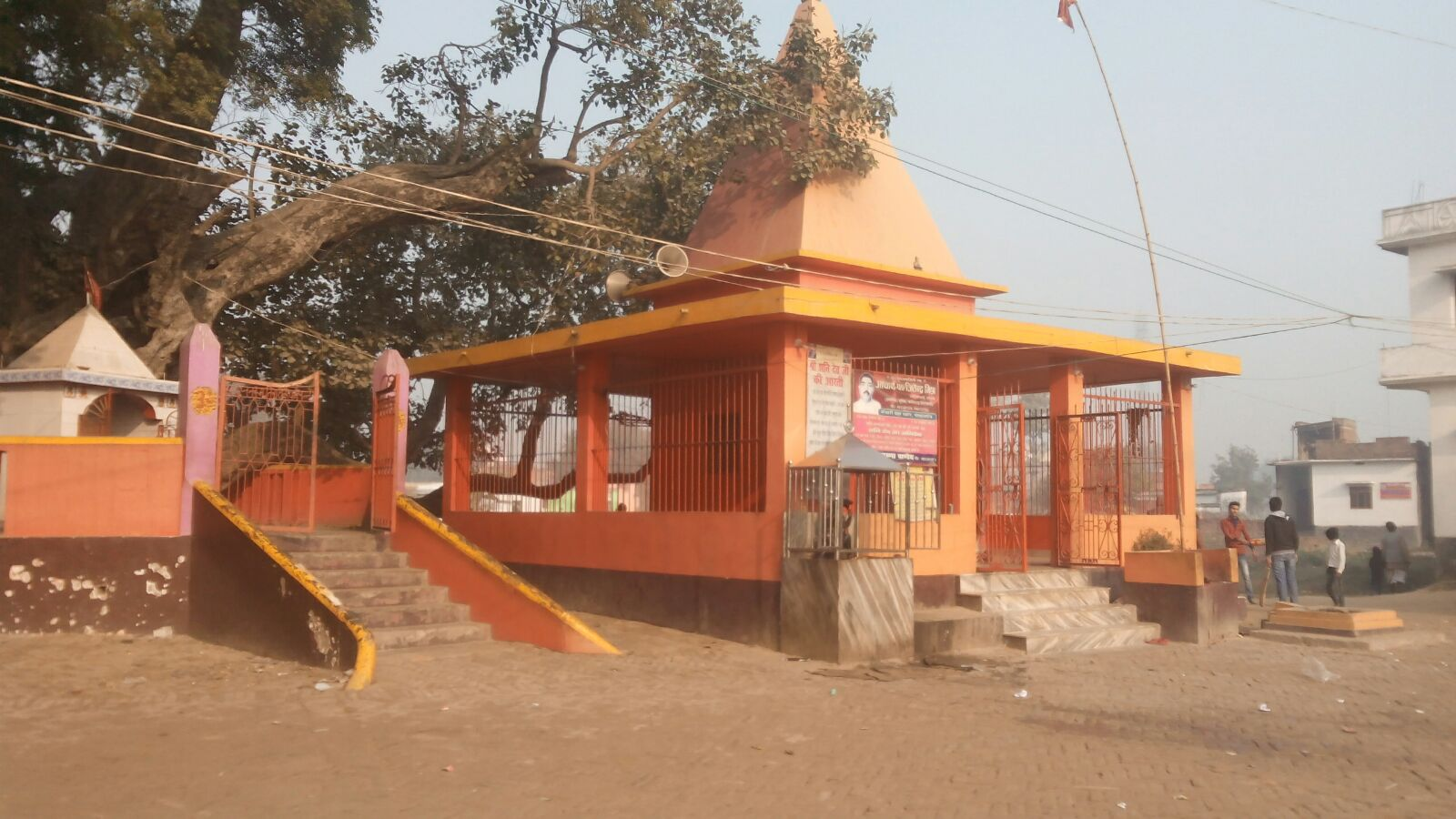
Banjari Braham Sthan

There is a temple known as the "Banjari Braham Sthan Mandir". This became the symbol of Hindu religion. This temple is steadily gaining in popularity. Now the people come here to make their wishes. The village is especially famous for the Banjari Brahma mela (fair).The mela is very important for the people of Banjari so that they can get blessings by The "Barhm Baba".
