= Phupagaon =

Phupgaon
- village
- Location in Odisha, India Phupgaon (India)
- Coordinates: 19°40′10″N 82°44′50″E
- Country: India
- State: Odisha
- District: Kalahandi
- Elevation: 313 m (1,027 ft)

Population (2001)
  - Total: 4,622

Languages
  - Official: Odia
- Time zone: UTC+5:30 (IST)
- PIN: 766019
- Vehicle registration: OR-08/OD-08
- Sex ratio: 49.2:50.8 ♂/♀
- Website: odisha.gov.in

Phupgaon is a village in Kalahandi district, Odisha, India and this gram panchayat comes under Kokasara tehsil. It is 4 km away from its main town and block (Panchayat Samiti) Kokasara.
