= Banjaria (community development block) =

Block in Bihar, India

- Community development block
- Location within Bihar Location within India
- Coordinates: 26°40′08″N 84°54′59″E
- Country: India
- State: Bihar
- District: East Champaran

Government
  - Type: Panchayat Samiti

Area
  - Total: 138 km^{2} (53 sq mi)
- Elevation: 68 m (223 ft)

Population (2011)
  - Total: 162,684
  - Density: 1,180/km^{2} (3,050/sq mi)

Languages
  - Official: Hindi & Urdu
- Time zone: UTC+5:30 (IST)
- PIN: 845401
- STD code: 06252
- Vehicle registration: BR-05

Banjaria is a community development block in East Champaran District, Bihar, India. The administrative center of the block is the town of Banjaria. In the year 2011, the block has a population of 162,684.

== Geography ==
Banjaria is located on the northern portion of East Champaran District. Its average elecation is 68 metres above the sea level.

== Administrative divisions ==
There are 30 villages under Banjaria Block:

- Ajgari
- Banjaria
- Banjaria (part)
- Bhela Chhapra
- Burhwa
- Chailaha
- Chichurahia
- Chitaha
- Gamharia
- Ghormarwa
- Janerwa
- Jatwa
- Kaparsandi
- Kukurjari
- Loknath Pur
- Pachrukha
- Pakaria
- Patkhaulia
- Phulwar
- Pipra
- Ratanpur
- Rohinia
- Semra Khas
- Semra Tola Bhola
- Semra Tola Hat
- Singhia Sagar
- Singia Hiban
- Siswa
- Sukhi Dih
- Tarkulwa

== Demographics ==
Religion in Dhamdaha
Religion	Percent
Hinduism	66.77%
Islam	33.03%
other	0.20%

According to 2011 Census of India, there are 32,464 households and 162,684 residents within Banjaria. The male population is 86,088, and female population is 76,596. The total literacy rate is 42.45%, with 49.90% of the male population and 34.08% of the female population being literate.

== See also ==
- East Champaran District
