= Koksara =

- Town
- Location in Odisha, India Koksara (India)
- Coordinates: 19°40′08″N 82°42′15″E
- Country: India
- State: Odisha
- District: Kalahandi

Government
  - Type: Panchayat Samiti (Block)
  - Body: Koksara Block

Population (2001)
  - Total: 4,255

Languages
  - Official: Odia
- Time zone: UTC+5:30 (IST)
- PIN: 766019
- Vehicle registration: OD-08/OR-08
- Sex ratio: 50.1:49.9 ♂/♀
- Website: odisha.gov.in
- This town comes in the way of National Highway 26

Koksara is a town and Gram Panchayat in the Kokasara Tehsil of Dharamgarh sub-division, located in Kalahandi District of Odisha State. Kokasara is 57km from district headquarter Bhawanipatna and 484 km from the state capital Bhubaneswar. Rita Agrawal is the Chairperson of Koksara Block, Sri Tribhuban Naik is the PS member from Koksara GP and Sri Kishor Chandra Pradhani is the Sarapanch of Koksara Gram Panchyat.

== Demographics ==
According to census 2001, Total Population of Koksara was 4,255, where it constitutes 2,131 of male and 2,124 of female population. Koksara had a total literacy population of 2,266, from which male literacy population was 1,435(63%) and female literacy population was 8,31(37%).The town had total sc population of 871 and total st population of 514. Whereas workers population was 1736, Cultivators population was 404 and non workers population was 2519 of the town according to census. The town had a balanced sex ratio as it led female per 1000 male was 997. The percentage of worker to population was 42%.

== Education ==
Schools nearby Koksara

- P U P School, Majursahi
- Saraswati Sishu Mandir, Ladugaon

Colleges nearby Koksara

- Priyadarshini Indira Mahavidyalaya, Junagarh
- Chandrika Jain Degree College, Borda
- Ladugaon Higher Secondary School, Ladugaon
- Panchayat Samiti Degree College, Koksara
- Panchayat samiti junior +2 college, koksara
- L.A. +2 Junior College, Behera

== Nearby Tourist Places ==
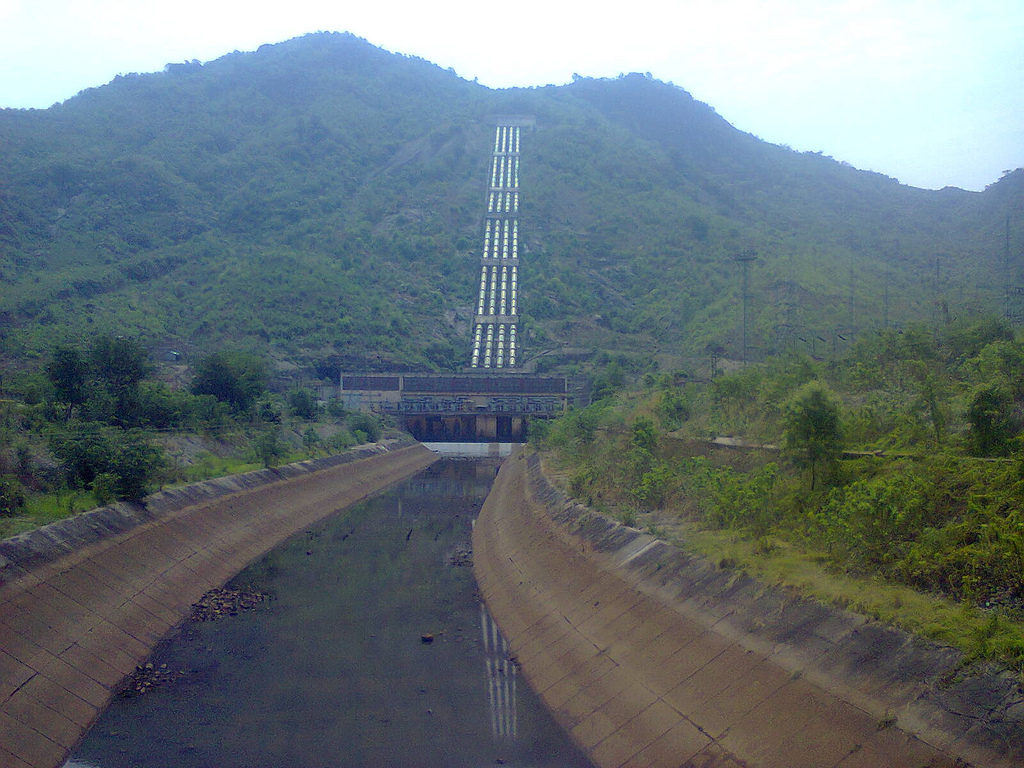
Indiravati Dam

- Indravati Dam

Indravati or Upper Indravati Hydro Power Project is one of the largest Dam in India as well as Asia. It is the largest dam in eastern India which produces 600MW of electricity. The Upper Indravati Project envisages diversion of water, of the indravati river in its upper reaches into the Mahanadi valley for power generation and irrigation.

The project would involve construction of 4 dams across the Indravati and its tributaries 8 dykes and two inter-linking channels to form a single reservoir with a live capacity of 1435.5 Mcum, 4.32 km. tunnel, a power house with installation of 4 units of 150 MW each turbines, 9 km. tail race channel and an irrigation barrage across Hati river with the associated irrigation canals i.e., Left Canal and Right Canal.

Irrigation from left canal is done in Kalampur, Koksara, Junagarh and Dharmagarh Block where Asia's longest aqueduct is made on Tel River near Odisha border. And right canal is done is Junagarh (Nandol area) and Bhawanipatna Block, the construction work is under process in Karlapada block where it merges with Ret River. The water comes from mainly Indravati River, Pet fula Naal etc.

== Hospitals nearby ==
- Sub-Divisional Headquarters Hospital, Dharamgarh
- Sardar Raja Medical College, Jaring Bhawanipatna
- District Headquarters Hospital, Bhawanipatna
- Life Worth Hospital, Bhawanipatna

== How to reach Koksara ==
AirPorts Nearby Koksara Raipur Airport 321 km near.

Railway Stations (Connecting Koksara)

- Junagarh: 35 km
- Bhawanipatna: 57 km
- Kesinga: 92 km

Notes-Major Nearby Railway Station that connects to Maximum Number of Main stations in India.
