= Parla, Kalahandi =

Village in Kalahandi district, Odisha

Parla
- Village
- Interactive map of Parla
- Location in Odisha, India Parla (India)
- Coordinates: 19.803385°N 82.702089°E
- Country: India
- State: Odisha
- District: Kalahandi
- Tehesil: Dharamgarh

Government
  - Sarpanch: BRIJLAL NAIK
  - MLA: SUDHIR RANJAN PATJOSHI

Area
  - Total: 1,022 ha (2,530 acres)

Population (2011)
  - Total: 3,543
  - Summer (DST): UTC+5.30
- Postal Code: 766103

Parla is a town and gram panchayat in Dharamgarh tehsil of Kalahandi district, Odisha, India. It is about 13 km from Dharamgarh (sub-district headquarters) and 60 km from the district headquarters at Bhawanipatna.

== Demographics ==
According to the 2011 census, Parla has a population of about 3,543.

== Governance ==
Local administration is managed by the Parla Gram Panchayat. Lachhipur, Semla and Chitamunda these villages are part of the Parla Gram Panchayat. which is responsible for government welfare schemes, rural development, and record-keeping.

== Hospitals ==
- Community Health Centre, Parla (CHC)
- Veterinary Hospital, Parla

== Economy ==
Parla has branches of Odisha Gramin Bank, providing banking, agricultural, and rural financial services to residents. Parla is served by its own Primary Agricultural Credit Society (PACS), supporting local farmers with credit and cooperative agricultural initiatives.

== Transport ==
Parla is connected to the Biju Expressway, a major highway traversing Kalahandi, enhancing access to other regions of Odisha and facilitating commerce and movement to industrial and agricultural centers. Regular bus services are available from Parla and nearby towns (Dharamgarh, Bhawanipatna) to the state capital Bhubaneswar and other cities.

== Culture ==
=== Temples ===
Parla village and its surrounding region have a number of Hindu temples reflecting the religious and cultural traditions of rural Kalahandi. The most prominent temple within the village are Maa Bhandargharani Temple, Mahadev Temple, which is an important center for local festivals and daily worship.

=== Festivals ===
Parla and the wider Kalahandi district celebrate a diverse range of festivals blending mainstream Hindu, and tribal cultures.

- Durga Puja (also called Dasara) is one of the most important and grandly celebrated festivals in Parla. Community pandals are established in the village and nearby localities with elaborate clay idols of Goddess Durga. The celebration lasts for several days, culminating with idol immersion processions. Similar to the rest of Kalahandi, Durga Puja is not only a religious but also a major social and cultural event, marked by music, dance, and fairs.
- Maa Maanpuriaani Khandabasa Masala Yatra (Local Goddess) is a unique and traditional festival mainly celebrated at Parla. The festival is observed during Durga Puja.
- Rath Yatra: The chariot festival of Lord Jagannath, observed throughout Kalahandi, including Parla.
